= List of rivers of Armenia =

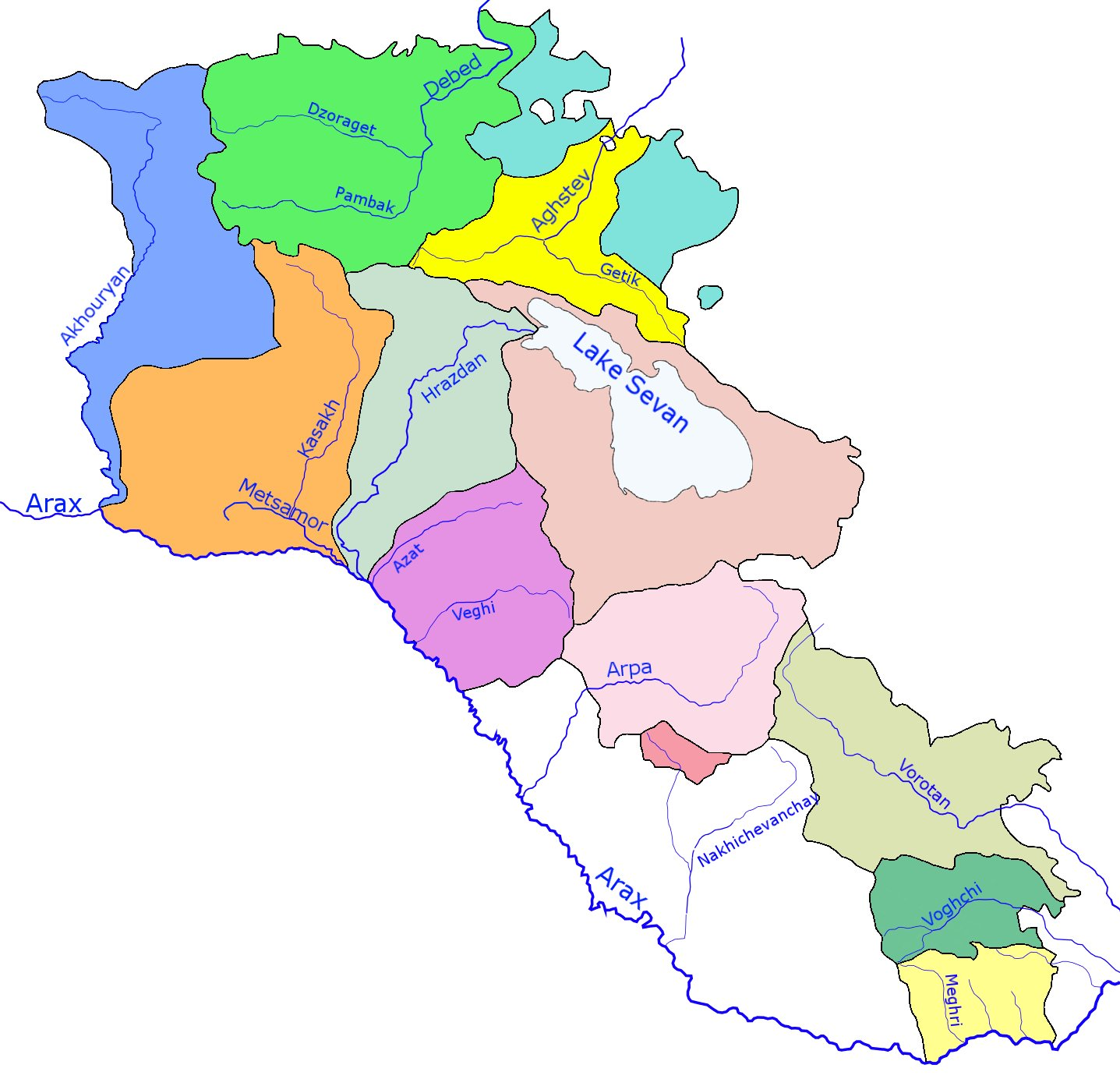
A map of Armenian rivers and their basins

The rivers of Armenia are part of either the Caspian Sea or Lake Sevan watersheds. Throughout history, Armenia has been called Nairi by the Assyrians meaning the "Land of the lakes and rivers". There are 16 rivers over 50 km (31 mi) long in or bordering Armenia. The longest river, Aras, has been mentioned in the Old Testament as one of the four sacred rivers of the Garden of Eden. There are about 9480 rivers and small streams in Armenia.

== List of rivers ==
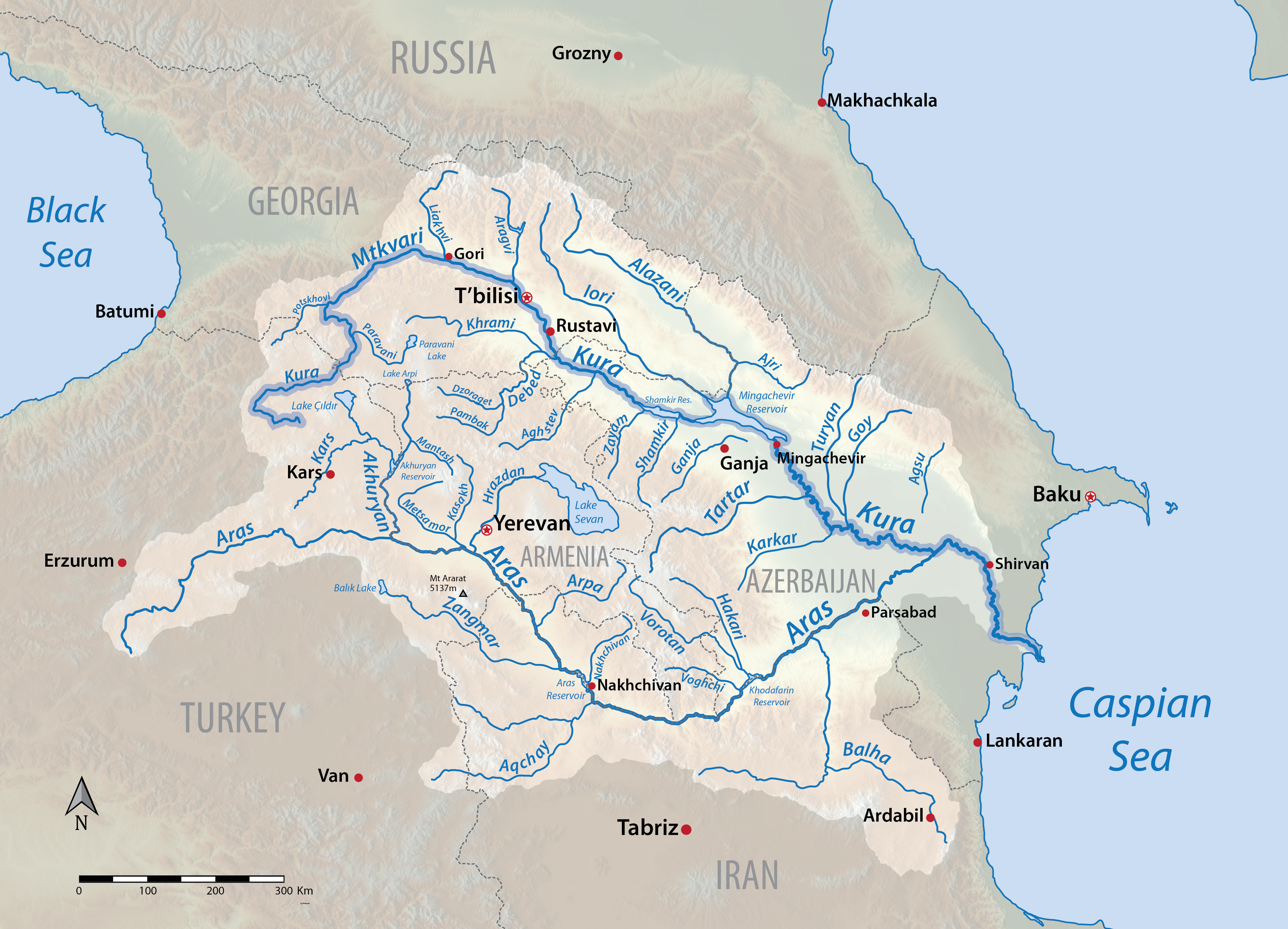
Kura River basin

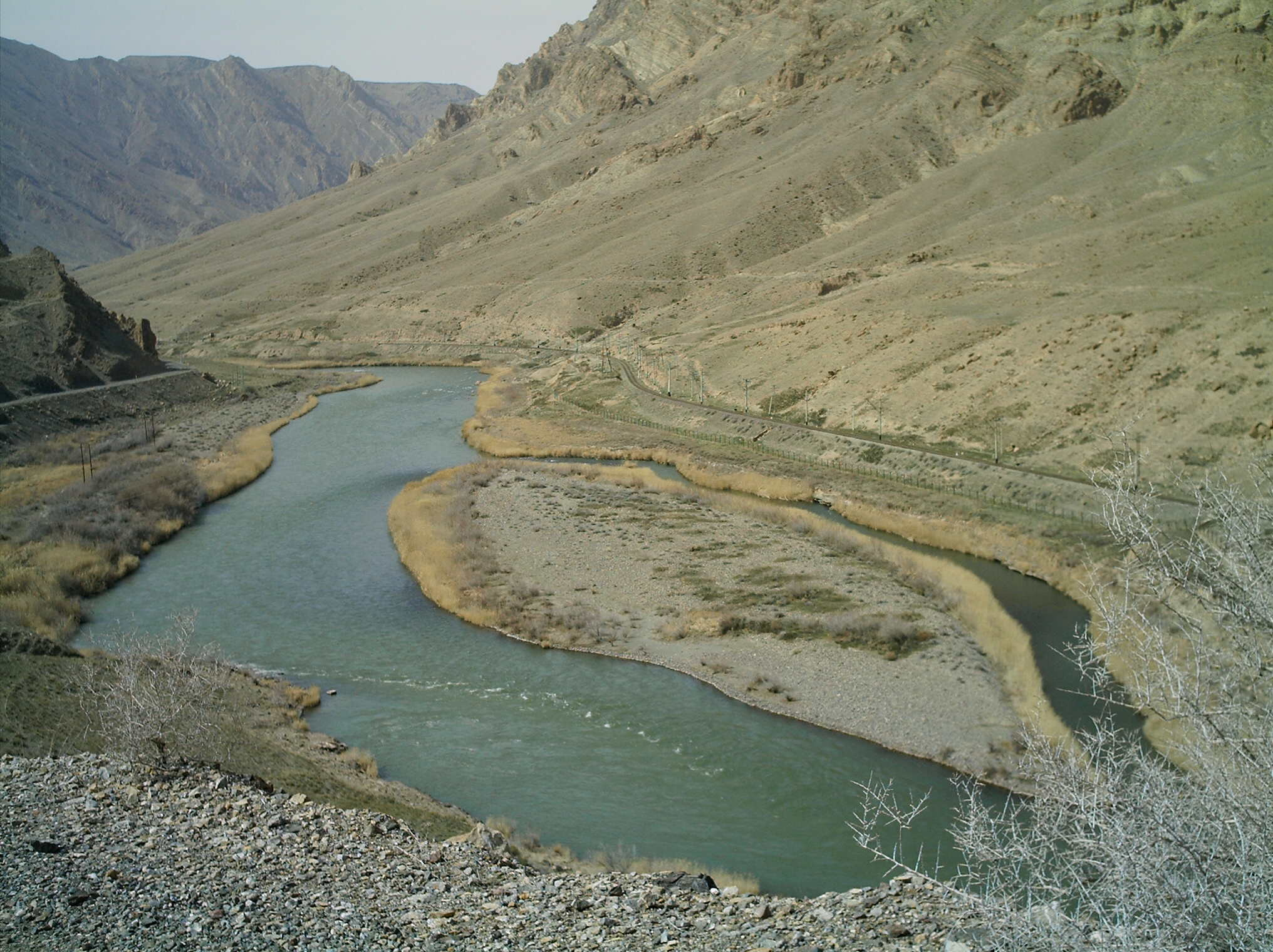
Aras River in the vicinity of Jolfa-Iran border

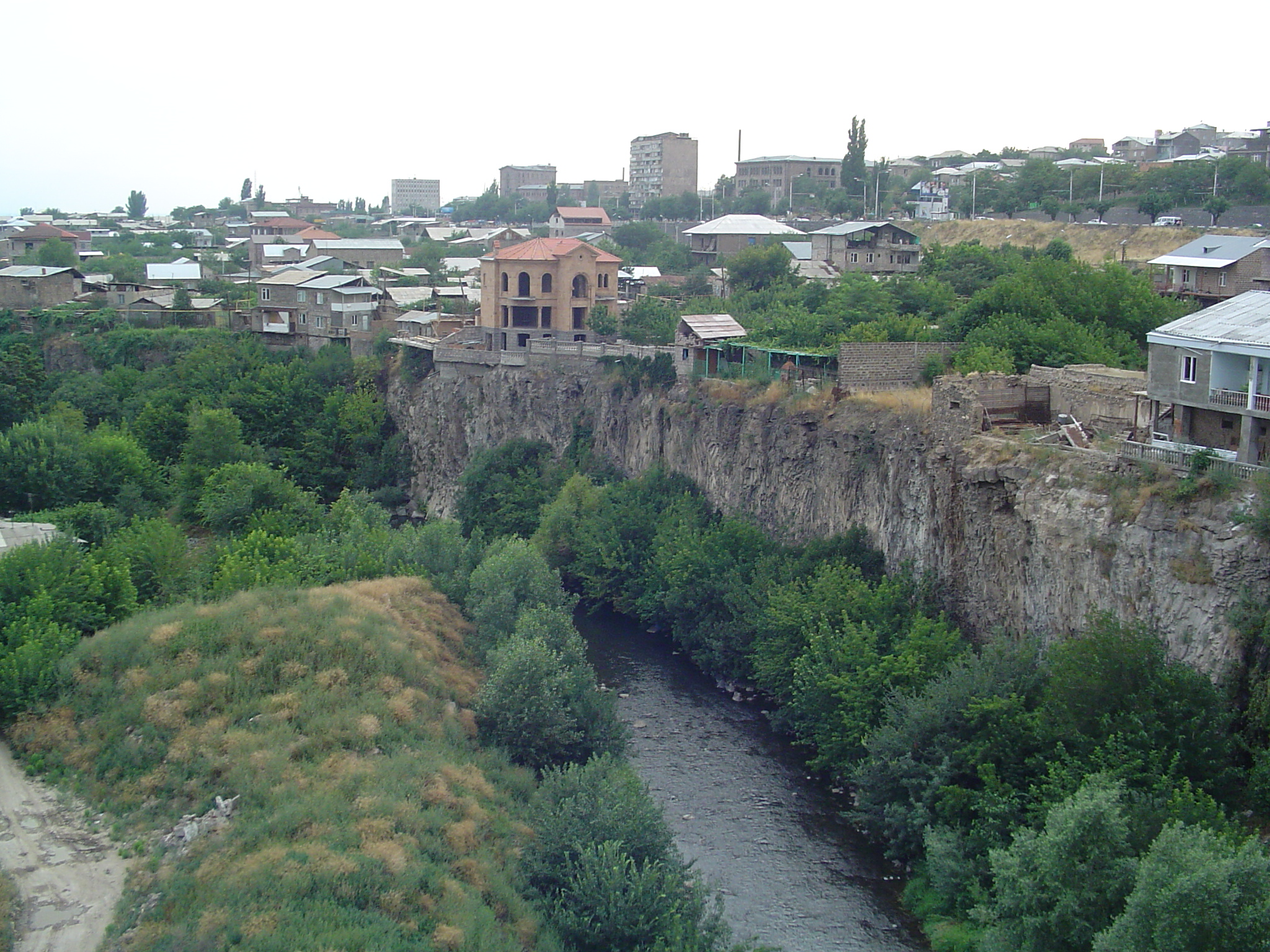
Hrazdan River in Yerevan

Approximately 4.7 percent of the territory of Armenia consists of rivers. The longest river of Armenia is the Aras (also called Araks, Arax), which lies on the country's border with Iran and a large part of the border with Turkey. Its major tributaries are the Akhuryan, Kasagh, Hrazdan, Azat, Arpa, Vorotan and Voghji rivers. The longest rivers in northwest part of the country are the Debed and Aghstafa, while shorter ones include the Dzoraget and the Pambak.

Most of Armenia is drained into the Caspian Sea by the Araks or its tributary, the Hrazdan, which flows from Lake Sevan. The Lake Sevan water basin include 29 rivers and streams flowing into the lake with a basin size of 4,750 km^{2} (1,830 sq mi). The following table is the list data about the longest or most notable rivers of Armenia:

Longest or most notable rivers of Armenia
River	Length	Basin size	Tributary of
Aras River (Araks)	1,072 km (666 mi) (158 km (98 mi) in Armenia)	102,000 km^{2} (39,000 sq mi)	Aras→ Kura→ Caspian Sea
Akhuryan River	186 km (116 mi)	9,670 km^{2} (3,730 sq mi)	Aras→ Kura→ Caspian Sea
Vorotan River	179 km (111 mi)	5,650 km^{2} (2,180 sq mi)	Hakari→ Aras→ Kura→ Caspian Sea
Hrazdan River	146 km (91 mi)	2,560 km^{2} (990 sq mi)	Aras→ Kura→ Caspian Sea
Arpa River	126 km (78 mi)	2,630 km^{2} (1,020 sq mi)	Aras→ Kura→ Caspian Sea
Aghstev River	99 km (62 mi)	2,500 km^{2} (970 sq mi)	Kura→ Caspian Sea
Debed River	92 km (57 mi)	4,080 km^{2} (1,580 sq mi)	Khrami→ Kura→ Caspian Sea
Kasagh River	89 km (55 mi)	1,389 km^{2} (536 sq mi)	Metsamor→ Aras→ Kura→ Caspian Sea
Voghji River	88 km (55 mi)		Aras→ Kura→ Caspian Sea
Pambak River	86 km (53 mi)	1,370 km^{2} (530 sq mi)	Debed→ Khrami→ Kura→ Caspian Sea
Dzoraget River	71 km (44 mi)		Debed→ Khrami→ Kura→ Caspian Sea
Getik River	58 km (36 mi)	586 km^{2} (226 sq mi)	Aghstafa→ Kura→ Caspian Sea
Vedi River	58 km (36 mi)		Aras→ Kura→ Caspian Sea
Azat River	56 km (35 mi)		Aras→ Kura→ Caspian Sea
Argitchi River	51 km (32 mi)		Lake Sevan
Getar River	25 km (16 mi)		Hrazdan→ Aras→ Kura→ Caspian Sea
Tandzut River	23 km (14 mi)		Pambak→ Debed→ Khrami→ Kura→ Caspian Sea
Vanadzor River	14 km (8.7 mi)		Tandzut→ Pambak→ Debed→ Khrami→ Kura→ Caspian Sea
Vachagan River	5 km (3.1 mi)		Voghji→ Aras→ Kura→ Caspian Sea

== See also ==
- Geography of Armenia
- List of lakes of Armenia
- List of rivers of Asia
- List of rivers of Europe
