= Hydroelectricity in Armenia =

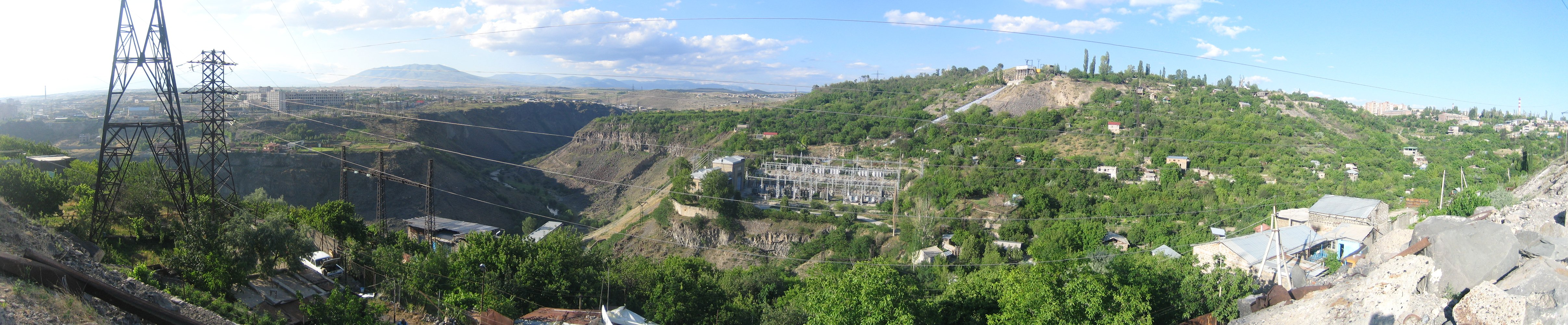
The Kanaker hydroelectric power plant along the Hrazdan river just north of Yerevan's Arabkir district

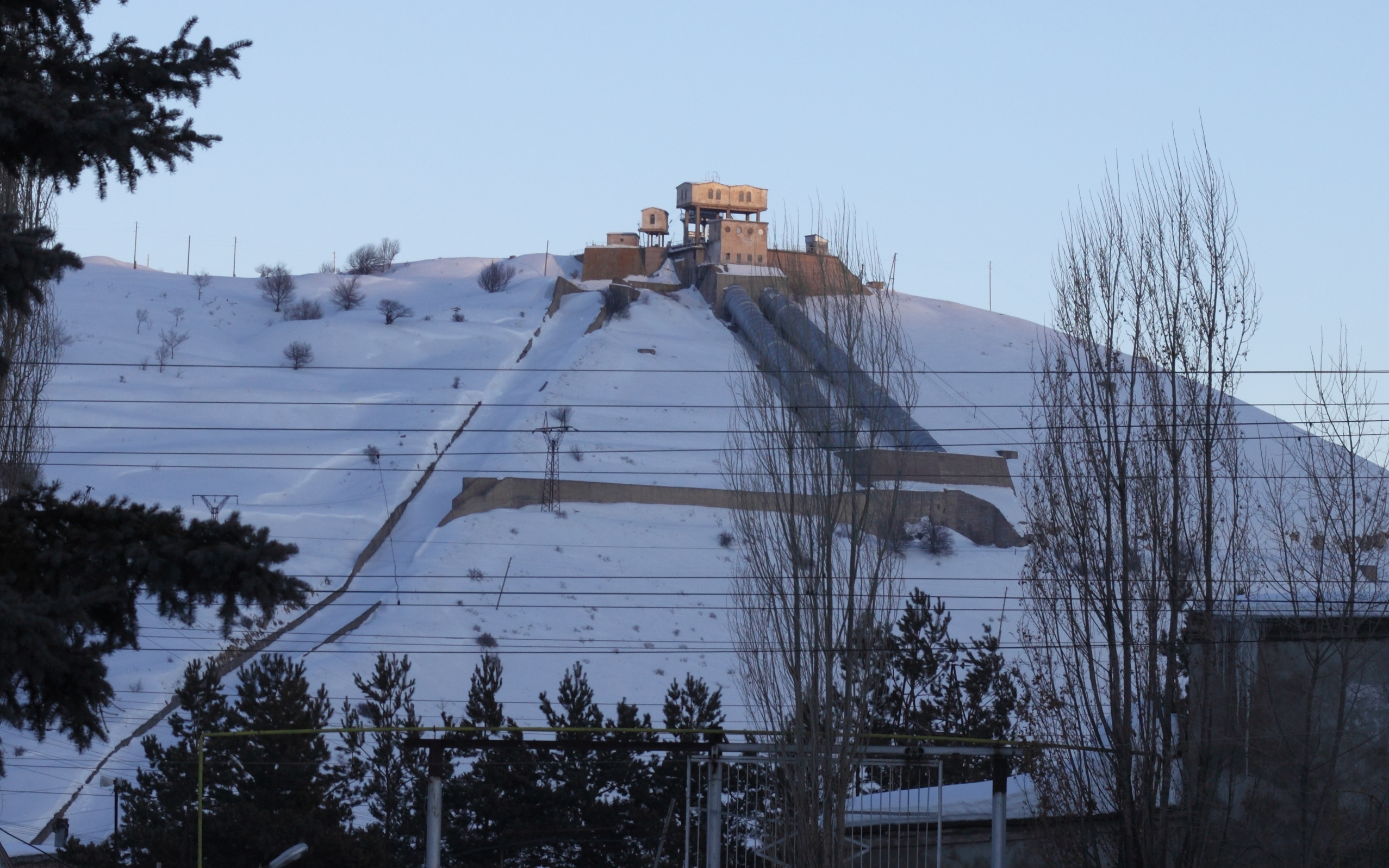
The Atarbekyan Hydro Power Plant in Hrazdan

Hydropower generates about 30% of Armenia's electricity but its share varies a lot from year to year.

Hydro power plants provide 70 percent of Armenia's renewable energy. Major HPP capacities are installed within Sevan-Hrazdan Cascade and Vorotan Cascade. The hydropower potential of Armenia is reported to be 21.8 billion kWh.

As of 1 January 2018, electricity was generated by 184 small HPPs, with total installed capacity of 353 MW. In 2017 the generation of the electricity from small HPPs was around 862 million kW*h, which is about 11% of the total generated electricity in Armenia (7762 million kW*h). As of 1 January 2018, and according to the provided licenses, 36 additional SHPPs are under construction, with about total projected 69 MW capacity and 250 million kW*h electricity annual supply.

The economically justified hydropower potential of Armenia is around 3.600 GWh/year. From this amount, 1.500 GWh/year (or about 42% of economically justified hydropower potential) has been developed already. Six of the plants are in the enclave of Nagorno-Karabakh.

== Large plants ==
Armenia has nine hydroelectric power plants which together accounted for one third of its domestic electricity generation. The plants are grouped along two cascades: the Sevan–Hrazdan Cascade and the Vorotan Cascade. The following table lists the details of each cascade:

Plant	Year built	Installed capacity (MW)	Annual average production (GWh)	Ownership
Sevan-Hrazdan Cascade	1936–1961	556	936 (reduced to 487 because of the level of Lake Sevan)	International Energy Corporation CJSC (privatized in June 2003) (90% of which belongs to Tashir Group, owned by Samvel Karapetyan)
Sevan Hydro Power Plant	1949	34.2	50	International Energy Corporation CJSC (privatized in June 2003) (90% of which belongs to Tashir Group, owned by Samvel Karapetyan)
Atarbekyan Hydro Power Plant (Hrazdan)	1959	81.6	136	International Energy Corporation CJSC (privatized in June 2003) (90% of which belongs to Tashir Group, owned by Samvel Karapetyan)
Gyumush Hydro Power Plant (Argel)	1953	224	378	International Energy Corporation CJSC (privatized in June 2003) (90% of which belongs to Tashir Group, owned by Samvel Karapetyan)
Arzni Hydro Power Plant	1956	70.5	13	International Energy Corporation CJSC (privatized in June 2003) (90% of which belongs to Tashir Group, owned by Samvel Karapetyan)
Kanaker Hydro Power Plant	1936	102	151	International Energy Corporation CJSC (privatized in June 2003) (90% of which belongs to Tashir Group, owned by Samvel Karapetyan)
Yerevan 1 Hydro Power Plant	1961	44	83	International Energy Corporation CJSC (privatized in June 2003) (90% of which belongs to Tashir Group, owned by Samvel Karapetyan)
Vorotan Cascade	1970–1984	405.46	1010.7	US company CountourGlobal
Spandaryan Hydro Power Plant	1984	76	154	US company CountourGlobal
Shamb Hydro Power Plant	1977	171	272	US company CountourGlobal
Tatev Hydro Power Plant	1970	157.2	580	US company CountourGlobal

=== Planned projects ===
Though both Iran and Armenia have long discussed opening a 140 MW, joint hydro power plant on the Artak's River – Meghri HPP (also known as the Araks Hydro Power Plant) – by mid-2021, the project had not begun construction. Coupled with the 60 MW Loriberd HPP, these projects would add a cumulative generation of 1,012 million kWh/year. The Meghri Hydro Power Plant is a joint Armenian-Iranian project slated to be constructed on the Araks River near Armenia's southern border town of Meghri.

In 2010, the energy ministers of Armenia and Iran signed a document on the long-anticipated construction of two hydropower stations on the Arax River. The agreement stipulates that the $323 million project will be fundamentally financed and operated by Iran, 793 million kWh of energy transported to Iran annually, and the stations transferred to Armenia's ownership 15 years later. Construction was expected to commence in 2011 and take five years to complete. By 2021, construction had not begun.

=== Small plants ===
According to a USAID sponsored report, 313 small hydroelectric power plants (small HPPs) with an installed capacity of 243.366 MW and an average yearly electricity production of 737.38 GWh are installed in the country.

List of notable small hydroelectric power plants in Armenia
Name of water reservoir	Number of HPP units	Total installed capacity (MW)	Average yearly production (GWh)
Debed River	79	35.501	123.47
Aghstev River	67	58.270	159.27
Akhuryan River	14	24.985	79.75
Kasakh River	14	7.905	19.16
Hrazdan River	13	9.070	27.37
Lake Sevan	20	22.965	66.03
Azat River and Vedi River	20	18.215	56.15
Arpa River	26	35.410	88.58
Meghri River and Voghdji River	53	21.245	72.63
Vorotan River	8	9.800	44.97
Total	313	243.366	737.38

== History ==
Some plants were lost in the 2nd Nagorno-Karabakh war, leading to electricity shortages after cables connecting the enclave were damaged.
