= Dzoraget (river) =

River in Armenia

Dzoraget Ձորագետ
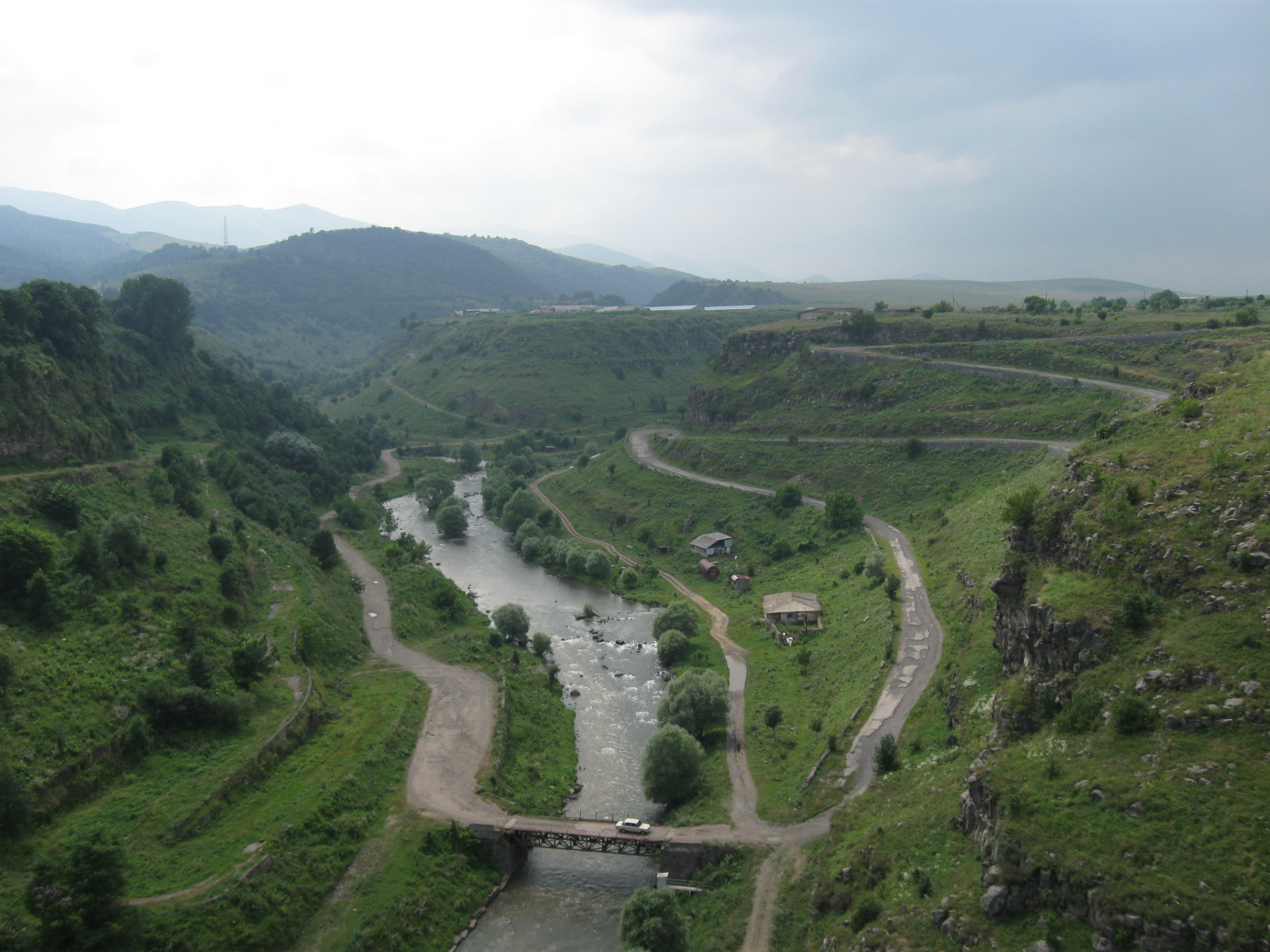
- The Dzoraget as seen from the bridge in Stepanavan

Location
- Country: Armenia

Physical characteristics
- Source
  - location: Bazum Mountains, Lori
  - elevation: 2,200 m (7,200 ft)
- Mouth: Debed
  - location: Near Dzoragyukh
  - coordinates: 40.957°N 44.6325°E
  - elevation: 920 m (3,020 ft)

Basin features
- Progression: Debed→ Khrami→ Kura→ Caspian Sea

The Dzoraget (Armenian: Ձորագետ) is a river in the Lori region in Northern Armenia. It originates in the Bazum Mountains and flows west to east through spectacular gorges around Stepanavan. It finally feeds into the river Debed near Dzoragyugh, which ultimately drains to the Kura.

Dzoraget is a compound word in Armenian meaning Gorge-river and formed with the lexemes ձոր [dzɔɾ] ('gorge') and գետ [ɡɛt] ('river') joined by the interfix ա [ɑ].

In certain places (e.g. at Kurtan), the gorge is over 200 metres (660 ft) deep.

== Rafting ==
The Armenian Travel Bureau considers the Dzoraget River the only Armenian river suitable for rafting. The commonest rafting route begins at the Dzoraget bridge, near the town of Stepanavan. Rafting on the river is concentrated in the Dzoraget Canyon, which is in some places as deep as 300 meters.

== Towns and villages ==
Towns and villages along the river include: Stepanavan, Amrakits, Lori Berd, Agarak, Vardablur, Kurtan, Arevatsag, and Dzoragyukh.

== Gallery ==
Dzoraget

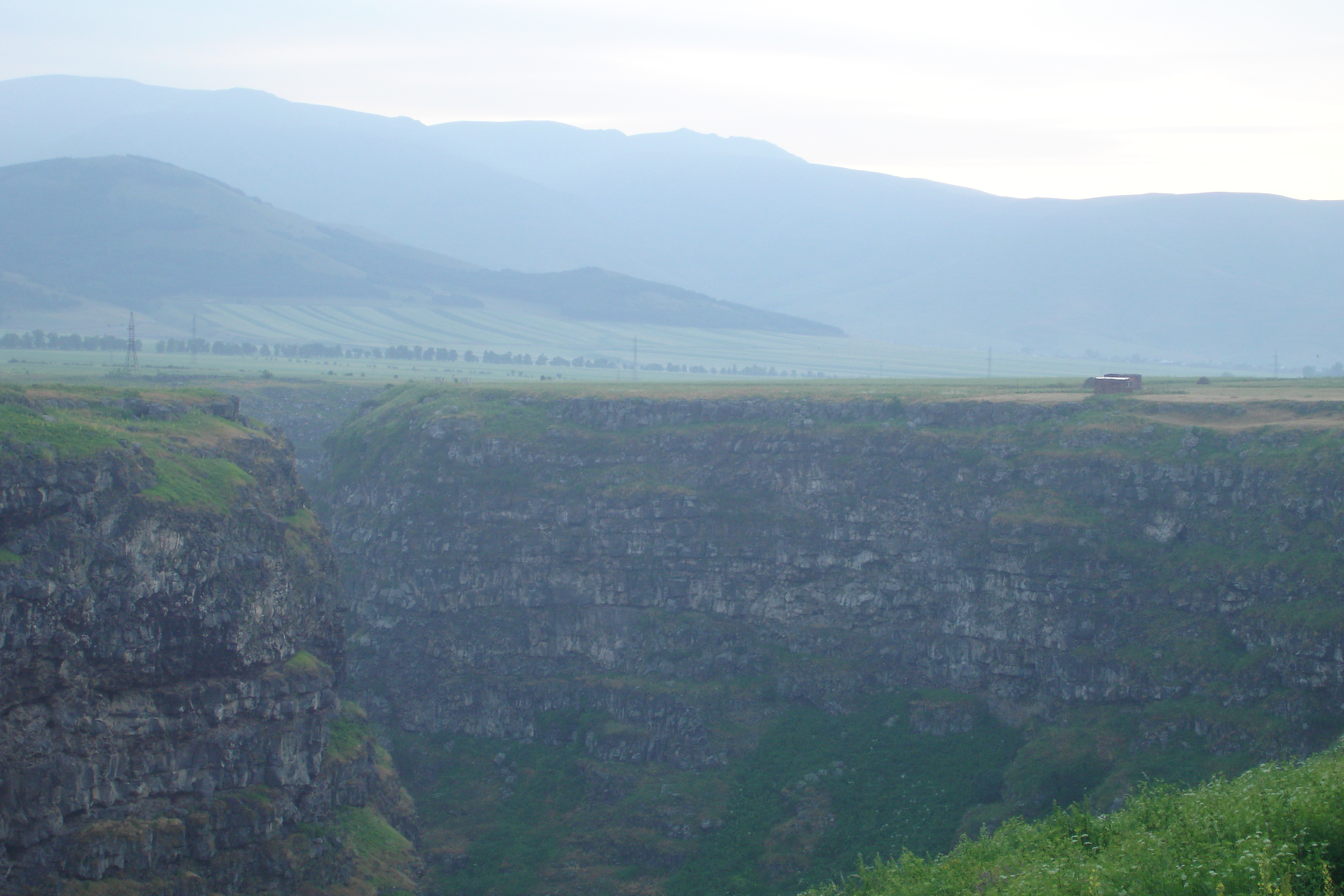
Dzoraget Canyon.

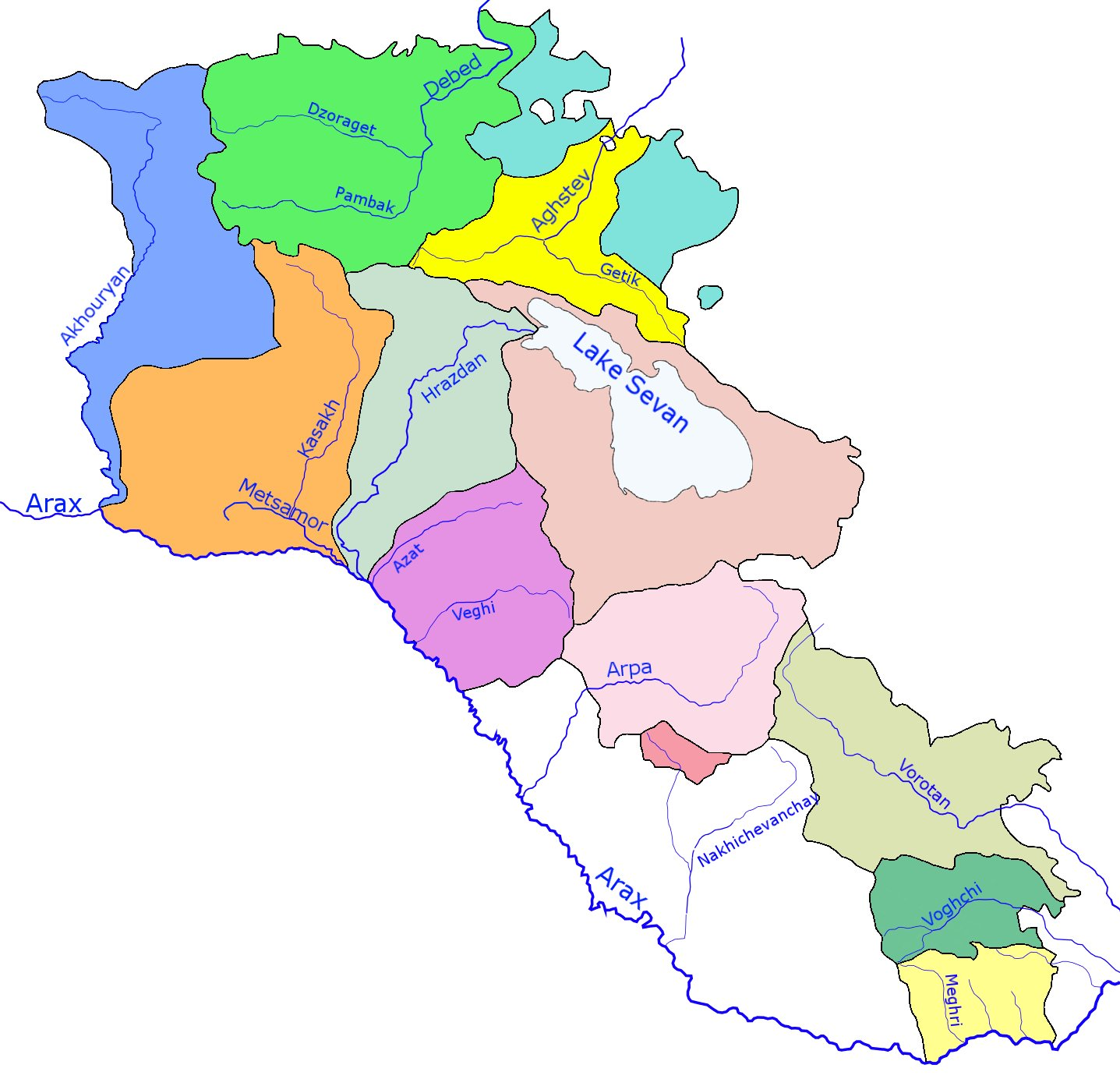
Dzoraget river and its basin (light green) within Armenia

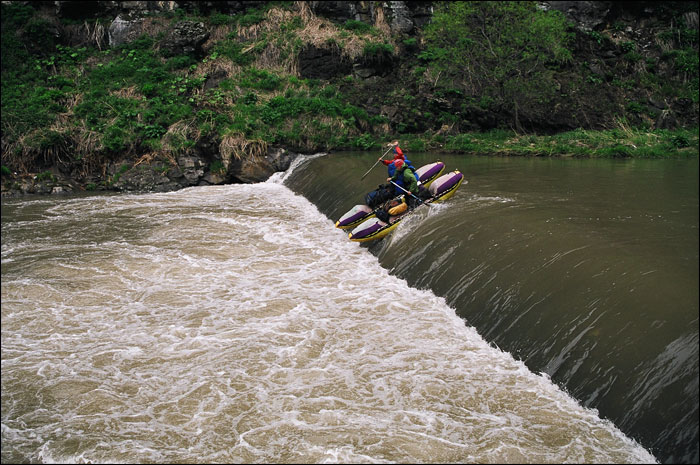
Kayaking on the Dzoraget

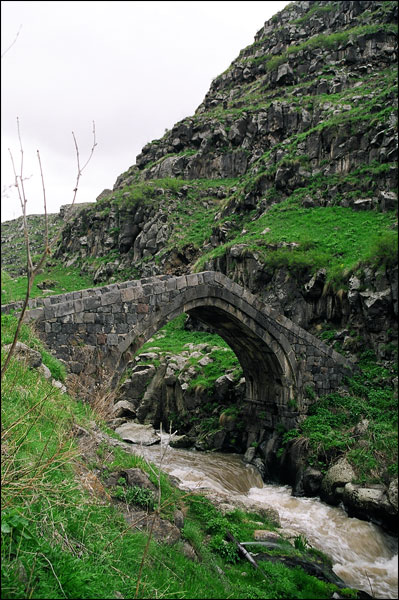
The Dzoraget bridge

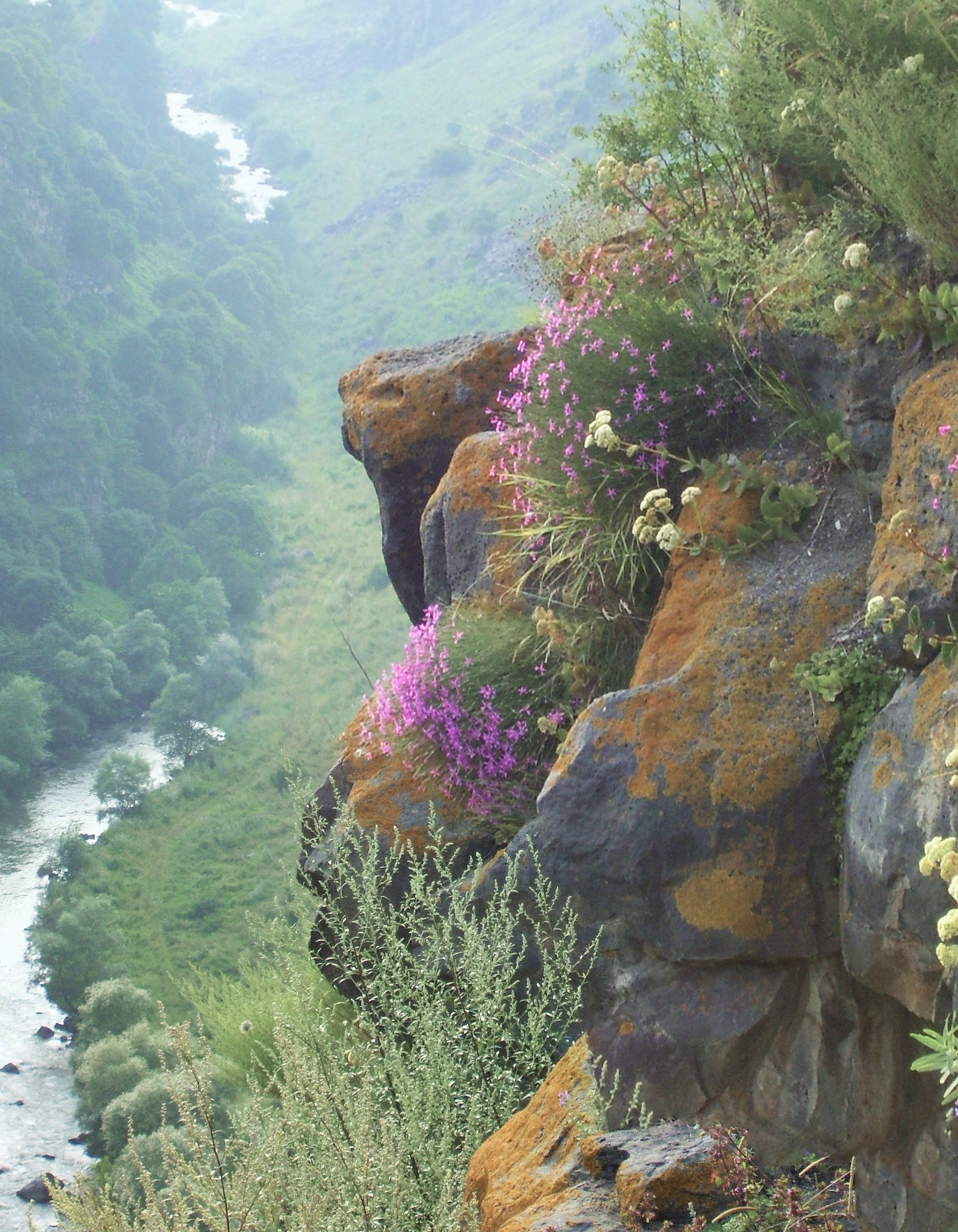
The Dzoraget River Canyon from Lori Berd

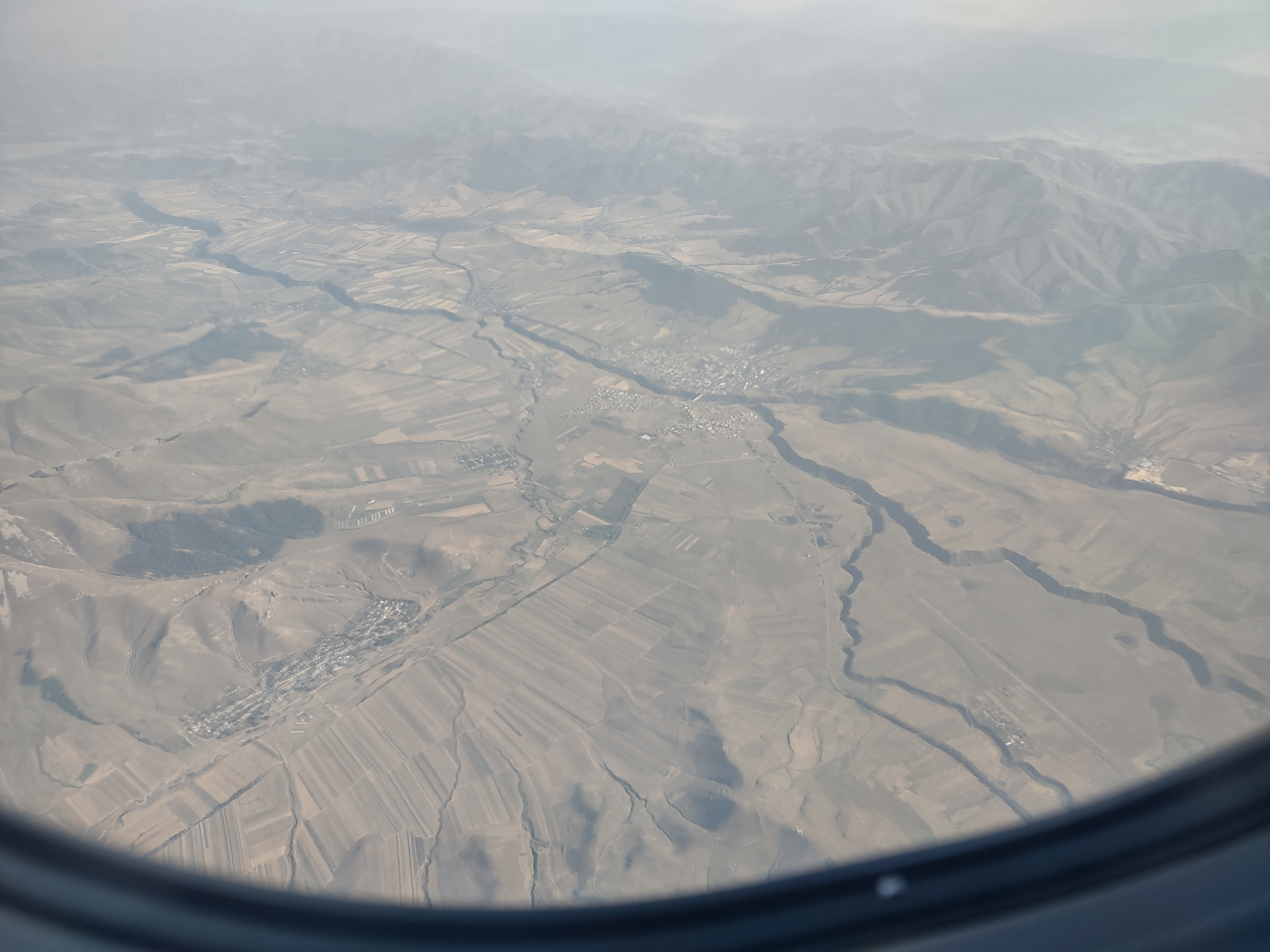
Dzoraget River and Canyon from the air

== See also ==
- List of lakes of Armenia
- Geography of Armenia
