= Vanadzor (river) =

River in Armenia

- Location within Armenia

Location
- Country: Armenia

Physical characteristics
- Mouth: Tandzut
  - location: Vanadzor
  - coordinates: 40.8041°N 44.4988°E
- Length: 14 km (8.7 mi)

Basin features
- Progression: Tandzut→ Pambak→ Debed→ Khrami→ Kura→ Caspian Sea

Vanadzor (Armenian: Վանաձոր), is a river in Lori Province, Northern Armenia. It is 14 kilometres (8.7 mi) long, and discharges into the Tandzut (a tributary of the Pambak) in the town of Vanadzor.
