= Hrazdan (river) =

River in Armenia

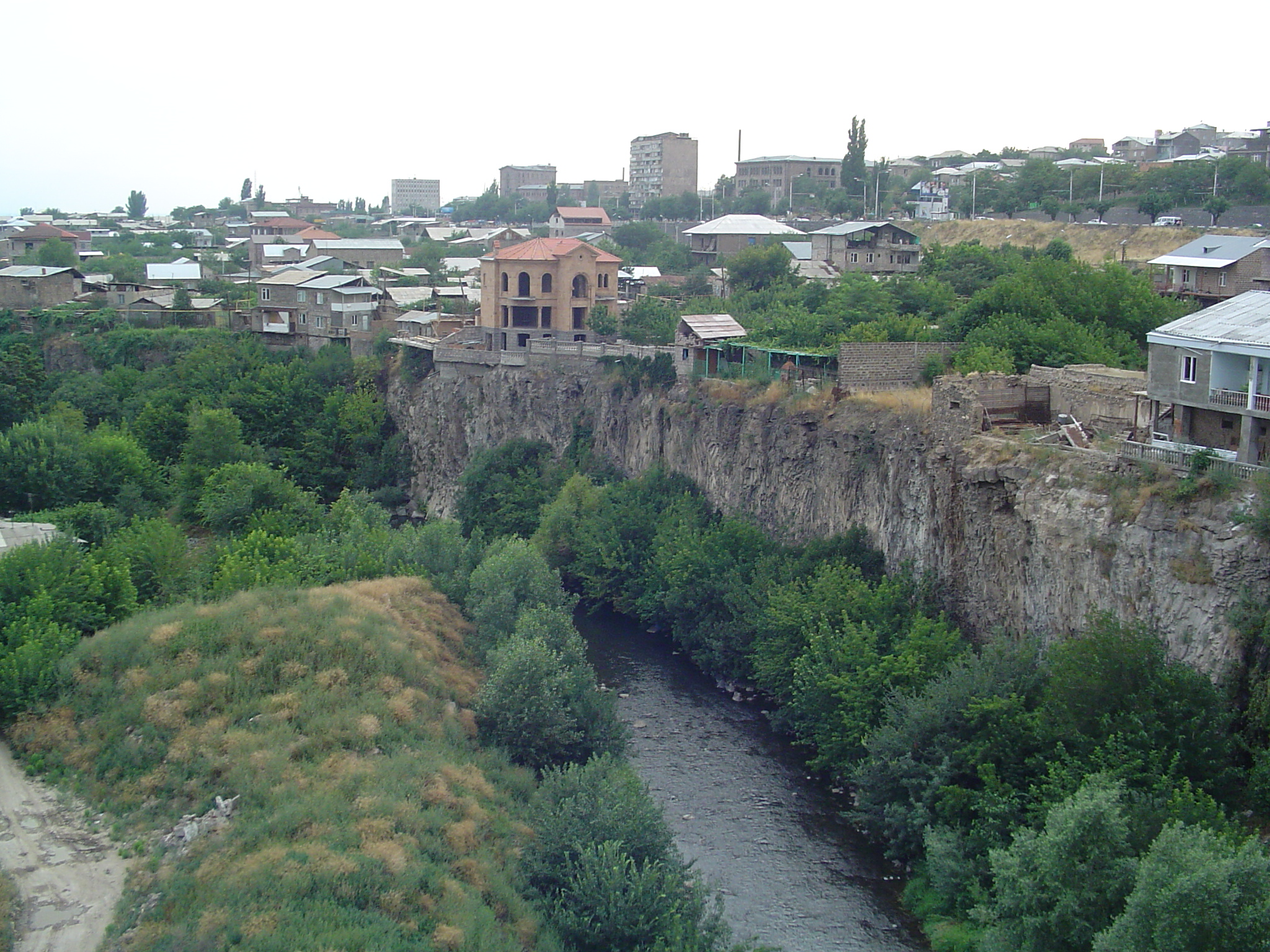
- The river in Yerevan

Location
- Country: Armenia

Physical characteristics
- Source
  - location: Lake Sevan
  - elevation: 1,904 m (6,247 ft)
- Mouth: Aras
  - coordinates: 39°59′25″N 44°27′10″E
  - elevation: 826 m (2,710 ft)
- Length: 141 km (88 mi)
- Basin size: 2,560 km^{2} (990 sq mi)
- Discharge
  - average: 17.9 m^{3}/s (630 cu ft/s)

Basin features
- Progression: Aras→ Kura→ Caspian Sea
- Tributaries
  - left: Getar

The Hrazdan (Armenian: Հրազդան, Hrazdan) is a major river and the second largest in Armenia. It originates at the northwest extremity of Lake Sevan and flows south through the Kotayk Province and Armenia's capital, Yerevan; the lake in turn is fed by several streams. In the Ararat plain it joins the Aras river along the border with Turkey. It joins as a left tributary the Kura river, which then flows into the Caspian Sea.

A series of hydro-electric projects have been constructed on the Hrazdan. Its waters are in demand to irrigate crops.

== Names ==
The river is called Ildaruni in Urartian inscriptions.

The name Hrazdan derives from a Middle Iranian form of Avestan Frazdānu, which in Zoroastrian mythology is the body of water by which Vishtaspa converted to Zoroastrianism. Frazdānu is composed of the elements fraz 'elevated, high' and dānu 'river'. Dānu derives from the same Iranian root as a number of hydronyms in Europe, such as Don, Dnieper, Danube and Dniester. The change of word-initial fr- to hr- can be seen in a number of Iranian borrowings into Armenian. The Hrazdan is mentioned in Movses Khorenatsi's history. In the history attributed to Sebeos, the form Hurazdan is used, while some later Armenian historians use the form Hurastan.

Its name in Turkic languages is Zangu, Zanga, Zangi, or Zengy. It was called Zanga in Tsarist Russian nomenclature.

== Geography ==
Lake Sevan (with 30 rivers contributing to its storage), the largest located in the central part of the country and the Hrazdan River which originates from it, together form the "Sevan-Hrazdan Management Area", which is one of the five sub-basins of the 14 sub-basins of Kura and Araks basins of Armenia. The river originates from the lake at an elevation of 1,900 metres (6,200 ft). The river which flows from the lake in a southern direction passes through a deep gorge as it enters on the western side of the Yerevan city, and then debauchees into the Aras River on the southern side of the city. The geological formations along the river course are made up of lava flows (existing as basalts) generated from three volcanoes in the Gegham range. The lava surfaces represent environments that existed in the form of "lakes, river channels and floodplains". The chronology of landscape of the upper most layer of basalts indicates an age of 200,000 years.

The river drains a total catchment area of 2,566 square kilometres (991 sq mi). Precipitation volume is 1572 million cubic metre from an annual rainfall of 257 millimetres (10.1 in) with a maximum of 43 millimetres (1.7 in) in May and a minimum of 8 millimetres (0.31 in) during August. The average temperature recorded in the basin varies from −3 °C (27 °F) in January to 26 °C (79 °F) in July with diurnal variation with the lowest night temperature of −15 °C (5 °F) in January and highest day temperature of 44 °C (111 °F) in July. The total flow in the river is 733 million cubic meter. The regulated outflow into the river, which forms the Ararat Valley, is utilized for irrigation and hydro-power benefits.

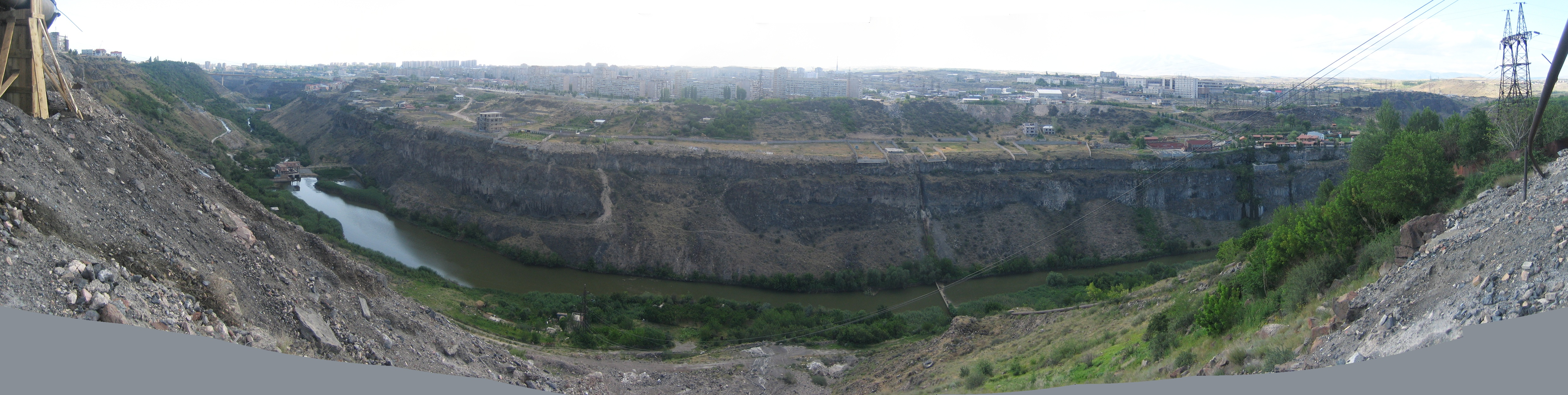
A panorama of the Hrazdan River gorge and Davtashen from Arabkir, Yerevan

=== Fauna ===
The fauna reported from the river includes 33 species of chironomids and 23 species of blackflies. The chironomids belong to five subfamilies of Tanypodinae, Diamesinae, Prodiamesinae, Orthocladiinae, and Chironominae. 25 species of invertebrates comprising two species of rotifers, 13 species of cladocerans and 10 species of copepods have been recorded in the river.

While the fish species contained in the lake consist of the Sevan trout (Salmo ischchan) or "Prince Fish," siga, crucian, carp, crayfish, bojak (Salmo ischchan danilewskii) and winter bakhtak (Salmo ischchan ischchan) and summer bakhtak (Salmo ischchan aestivalis), the river is reported to have species of crayfish as well as karas in abundance.

== Development ==
Hrazdan Gorge from Argel Village

The lake waters have been used for irrigation since the 19th century, and from early 20th century hydro-power development has also been implemented. The lake waters were planned to be used through the river for irrigating 100,000 hectares (250,000 acres) in the Ararat Valley out of which an irrigation of 80,000 hectares (200,000 acres) was created. The hydro-power development was planned on the river as the Sevan–Hrazdan Cascade involving seven schemes in a 70 kilometres (43 mi) stretch of the river with a total installed capacity of 560 MW with mean annual energy generation of around 500 million kilowatt hours; it is the largest hydro-power generating scheme in Armenia. This scheme was implemented between 1930 and 1962. These are small- and medium-size projects built as run-of-the river power plants. The seven power stations are: Sevan HEP with installed capacity of 34.2 MW with two units completed in 1949; the Hrazdan HEP of 81.6 MW with two units commissioned in 1959; the Argel HEP with installed capacity of 224 MW completed in 1953; the Arzni HEP with capacity of 70.6 MW with installation of 3 units commissioned in 1956; the Kanaker HEP with installed capacity of 100 MW with 6 units completed in 1936; the Yerevan-1 HEP commissioned in 1962 with installation of 44 MW with 2 units; and the Yerevan-3 with capacity of 5 MW with one unit commissioned in 1960. However, priority of release of water from the lake is for irrigation and accordingly the power stations are operated.

The civil works involved construction of diversion works, open canals or tunnels and power house which over the years were in need of substantial rehabilitation as they were all built around the middle of the twentieth century. In 2003, the International Energy Corporation", a Closed Joint Stock Company, acquired the projects from the Public Services Regulatory Commission of the country under a license No. 0108 for generation of electrical energy. Right from the time of acquisition they started rehabilitating the projects to maximize power generation. The works were completed during 2004. The works were carried out under a US$25 million loan from the Asian Development Bank.

== River pollution ==
The river water is polluted by effluent flows from agricultural, commercial, industrial, and residential development, but particularly by the untreated wastewater from Yerevan. This affects the water quality in the river with dissolved oxygen (DO) levels (less than 5% of the saturated dissolved oxygen level) remaining much lower than the permissible limits. A study carried out in 2008 indicates that a 16 km stretch of the river, from 2 km upstream of the Yerevan wastewater outfalls to 14 km below, is insufficiently aerated to provide a healthy environment for aquatic life.

A study assessing the river's ecological state from 2016 to 2018 found a significant degradation in water quality as the river flows downstream, primarily due to the influx of untreated municipal, agricultural, and industrial wastewater.

== See also ==
- List of rivers of Armenia
- List of lakes of Armenia
- Geography of Armenia

== Bibliography ==
- Holding, Deirdre (2014). Armenia: with Nagorno Karabagh. Bradt Travel Guides. ISBN 978-1-84162-555-3.
