= Tandzut (river) =

River in Armenia

- Location within Armenia

Location
- Country: Armenia
- Province: Lori

Physical characteristics
- Source
  - location: Pambak Mountain range
- Mouth: Pambak
  - location: Vanadzor
  - coordinates: 40.8160°N 44.4991°E
- Length: 23 km (14 mi)

Basin features
- Progression: Pambak→ Debed→ Khrami→ Kura→ Caspian Sea
- Tributaries
  - left: Vanadzor

The Tandzut (Armenian: Տանձուտ, also Գարպի Garpi) is a river in Lori Province, Northern Armenia, a right tributary of the river Pambak (Kura basin). The source of the river is located on the Northern side of Pambak mountain range. The river is 23 kilometres (14 mi) long. It flows into the Pambak near the town of Vanadzor. The river Vanadzor is a tributary of the Tandzut.

== Pollution ==
According to an article at MyNews.am large amounts of household and industrial waste are commonly sighted in and along the river.
