= Kasagh (river) =

River in Armenia

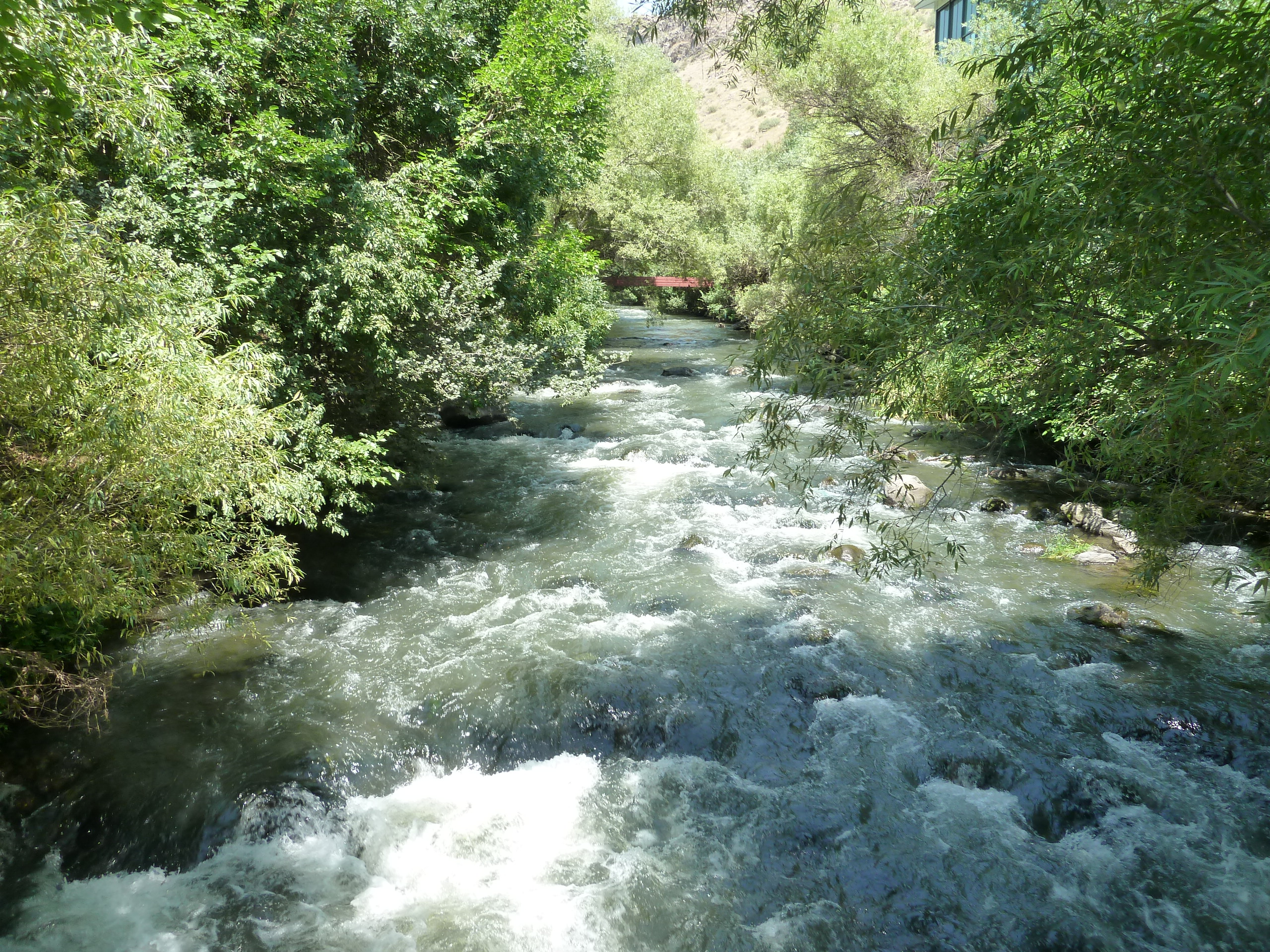
- The Kasagh in Ashtarak

Location
- Country: Armenia

Physical characteristics
- Mouth: Metsamor
  - coordinates: 40°06′28″N 44°14′16″E

Basin features
- Progression: Metsamor→ Aras→ Kura→ Caspian Sea

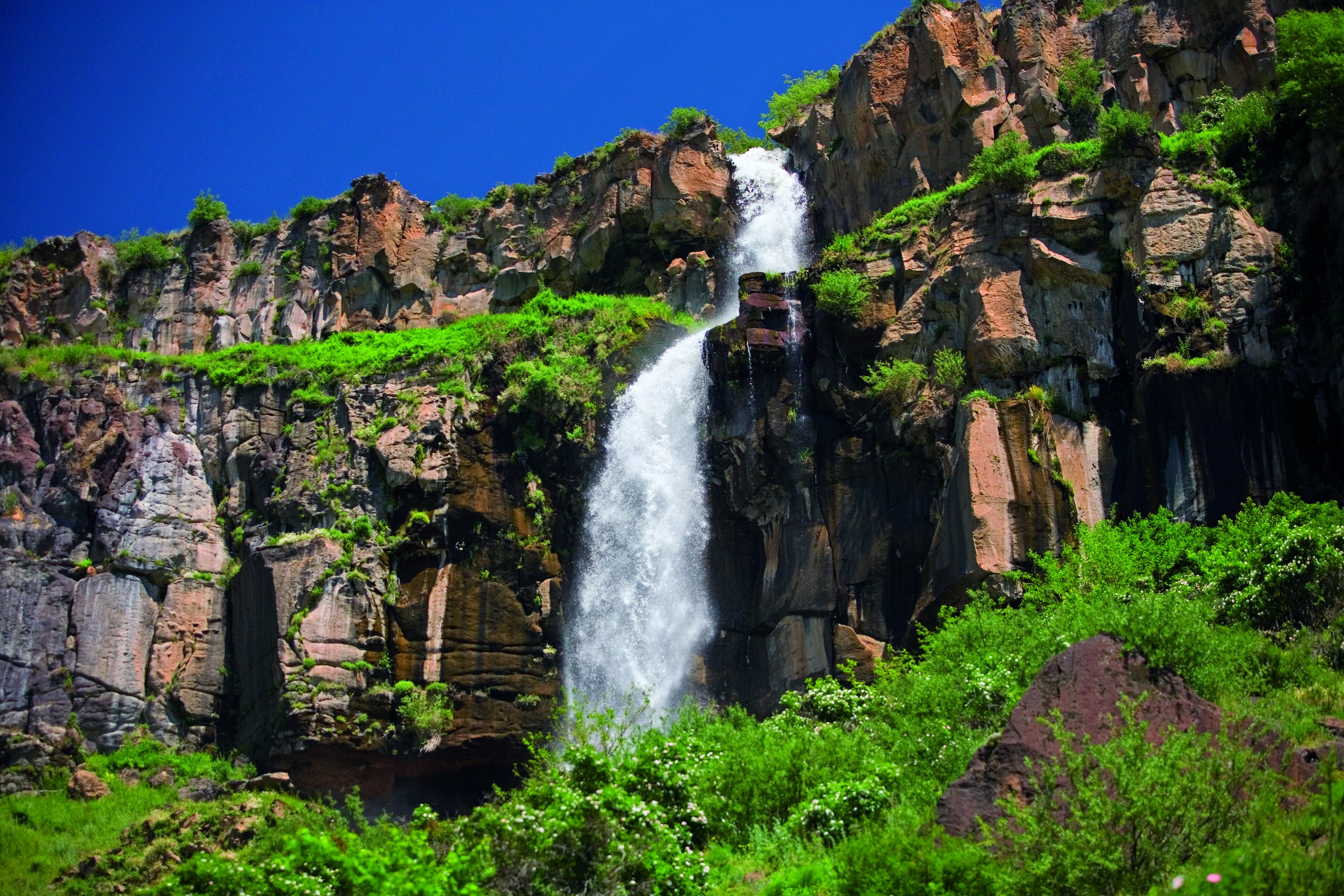
Kasagh waterfall

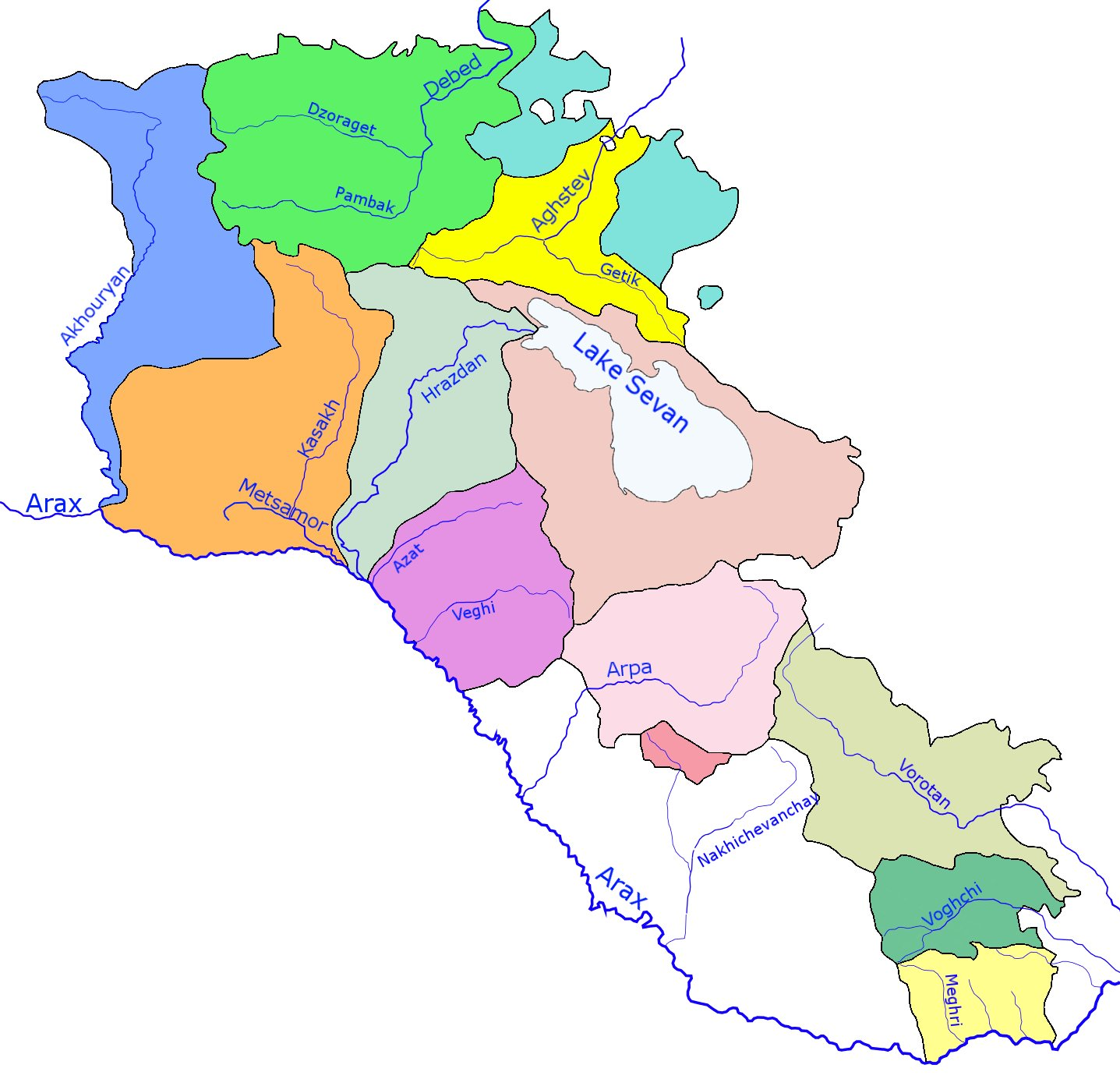
Kasagh river and its basin (orange) within Armenia

Kasagh (Armenian: Քասաղ) is a river in the west-central region of modern Armenia which flows north to south. It originates near Mount Aragats in Aragatsotn province, flows south into Armavir province and into the Metsamor, which itself is a tributary of the Aras.

== Sites along the river ==
From north to south:

- the town of Aparan
- the Aparan reservoir
- Saghmosavank, an Armenian monastic complex
- Hovhannavank, a 13th-century Armenian monastic complex
- the town of Ashtarak
- the town of Oshakan
- the city of Vagharshapat

== Gallery ==
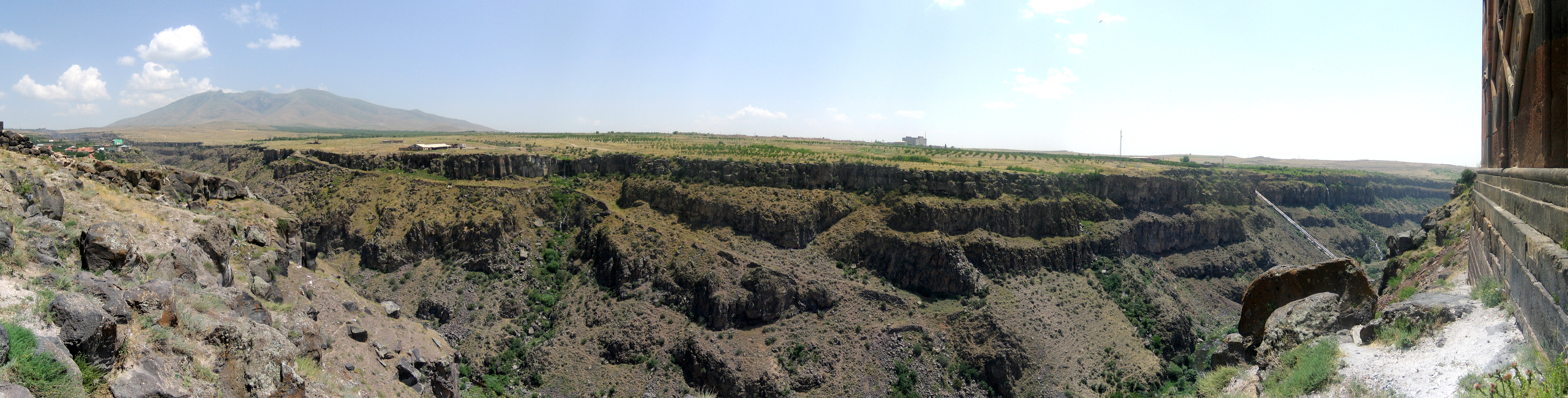
The Kasagh canyon at Hovhannavank monastery

== See also ==
- List of lakes of Armenia
- Geography of Armenia
