= Pambak (river) =

River in Armenia

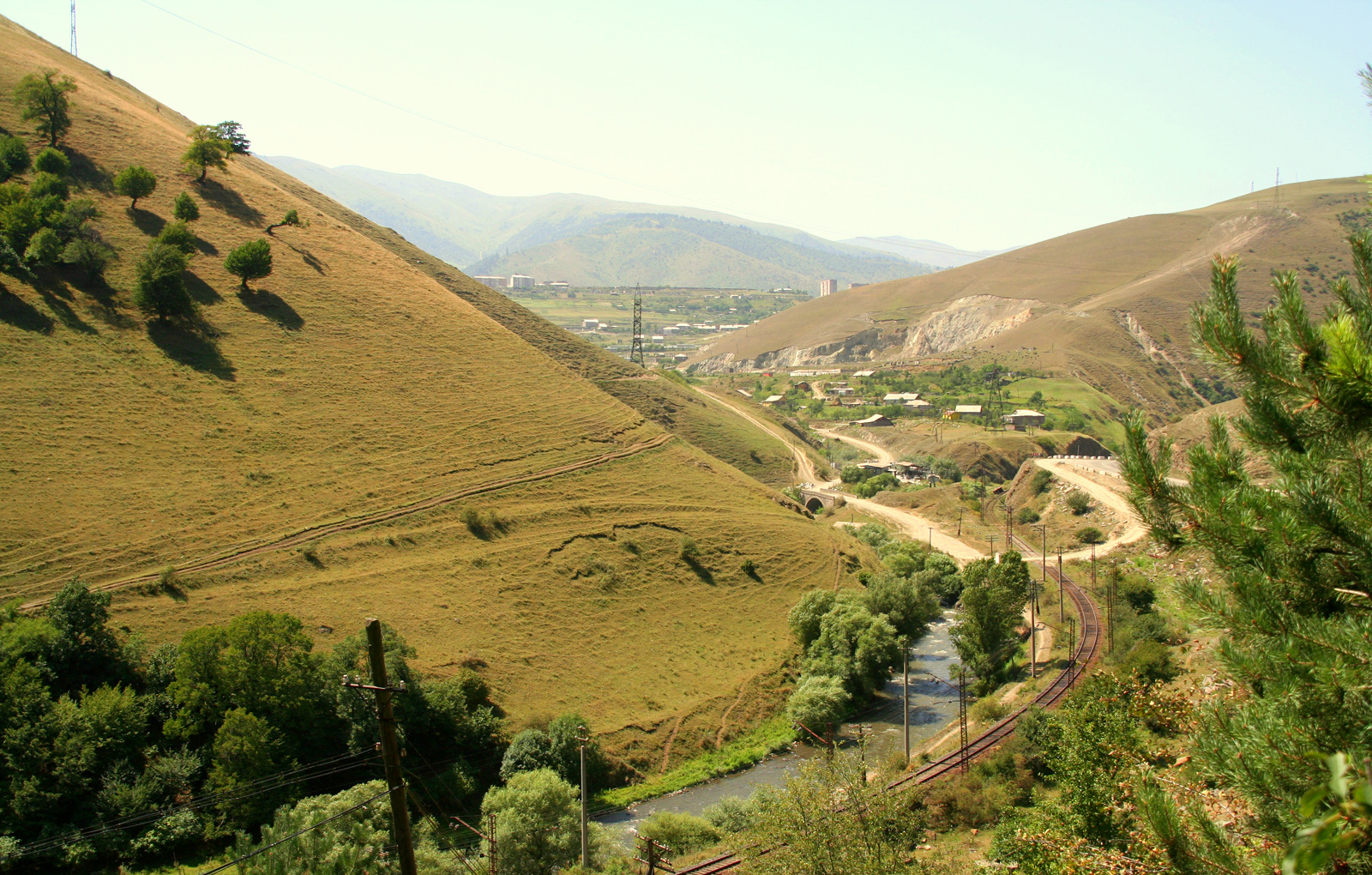
- The Pambak flowing towards the city of Vanadzor

Location
- Country: Armenia
- Province: Lori

Physical characteristics
- Source
  - location: Pambak Mountains
  - elevation: 2,200 m (7,200 ft)
- Mouth: Debed
  - location: Near Dzoragyukh
  - coordinates: 40°57′26″N 44°37′57″E
- Length: 86 km (53 mi)
- Basin size: 1,370 km^{2} (530 sq mi)

Basin features
- Progression: Debed→ Khrami→ Kura→ Caspian Sea
- Tributaries
  - right: Tandzut

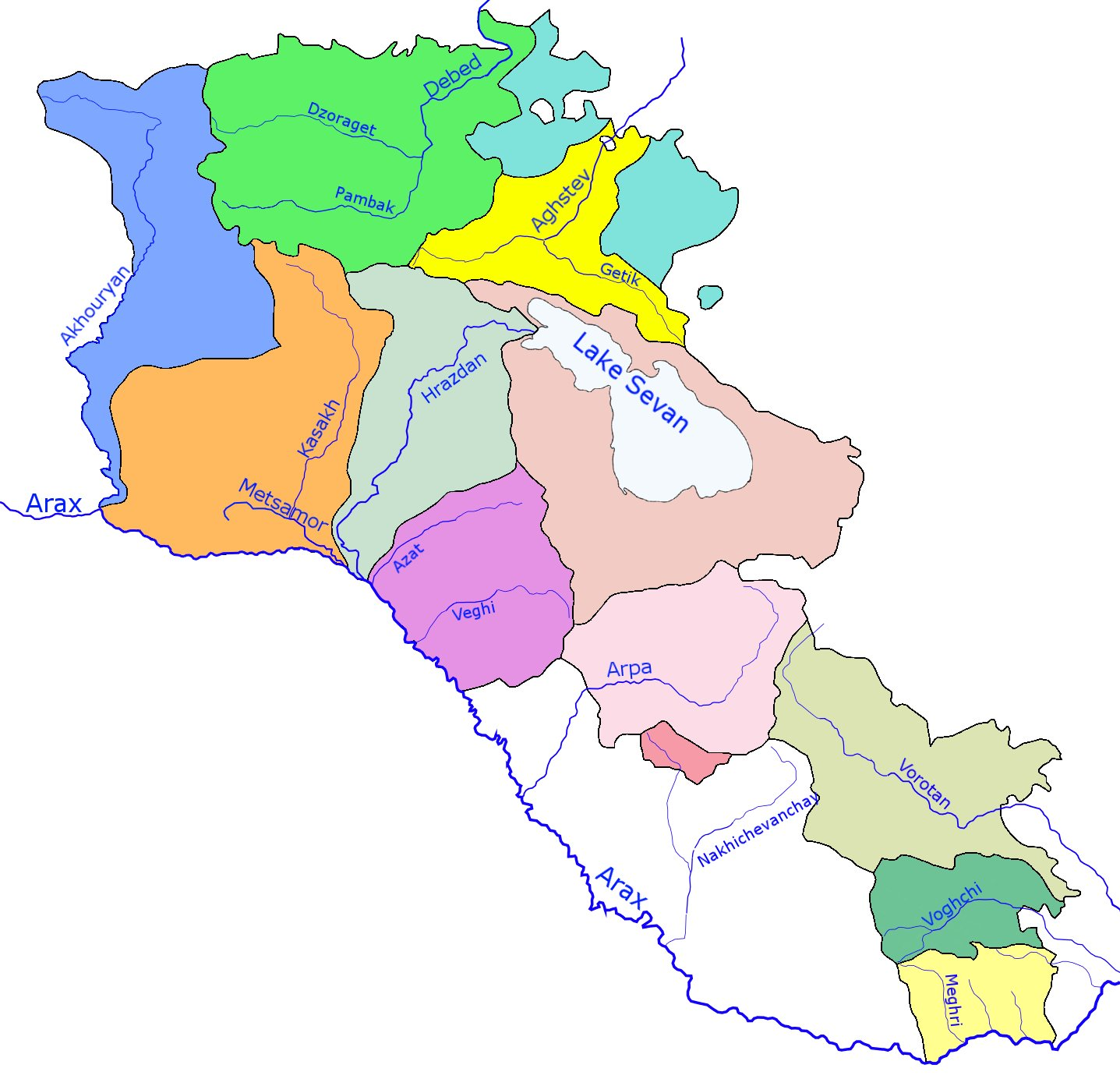
Rivers in Armenia

The Pambak (Armenian: Փամբակ), is a river in the Lori Province in Northern Armenia. It is a tributary of the Debed river. It originates in the Pambak Mountains and flows west to east through spectacular gorges around Bazum Mountains. It finally feeds into the Debed near Dzoragyugh, which ultimately discharges from the left into the Khrami, a tributary of the Kura.
