= Vedi River =

River in Armenia

Coordinates: 39°49′22″N 44°37′14″E

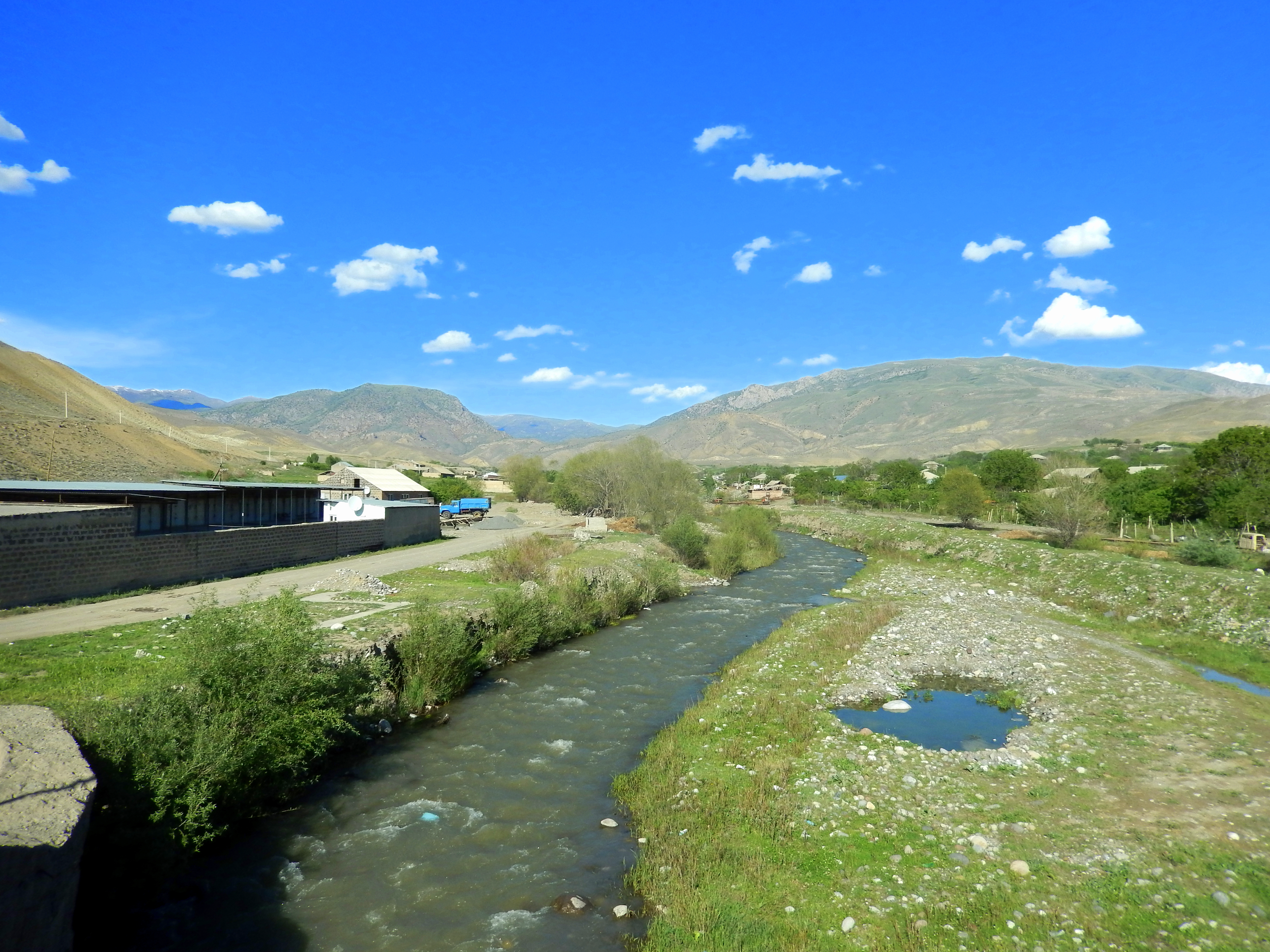
The Vedi River alongside the town of Vedi

The Vedi is a river is a river in Armenia that flows through the town of Vedi in the Ararat Province, stretching 58 km long (36 miles). The river originates from the Urts Mountains, contributing to the fertile landscape of the Ararat Plain, including fertility towards vineyards and other crops.

== Details ==
A major project associated with the river is the construction of the Vedi Water Reservoir, which is nearing completion. The reservoir will help manage the water from the Vedi and Khosrov rivers, improving irrigation for over 3,000 hectares of previously dry land. The construction of Armenia's highest dam will also allow for modern irrigation methods like drip irrigation.

== See also ==
- Vedi
- Ararat Province
- Ararat Plain
- List of rivers in Armenia
