= Aghstev (river) =

River in Armenia and Azerbaijan

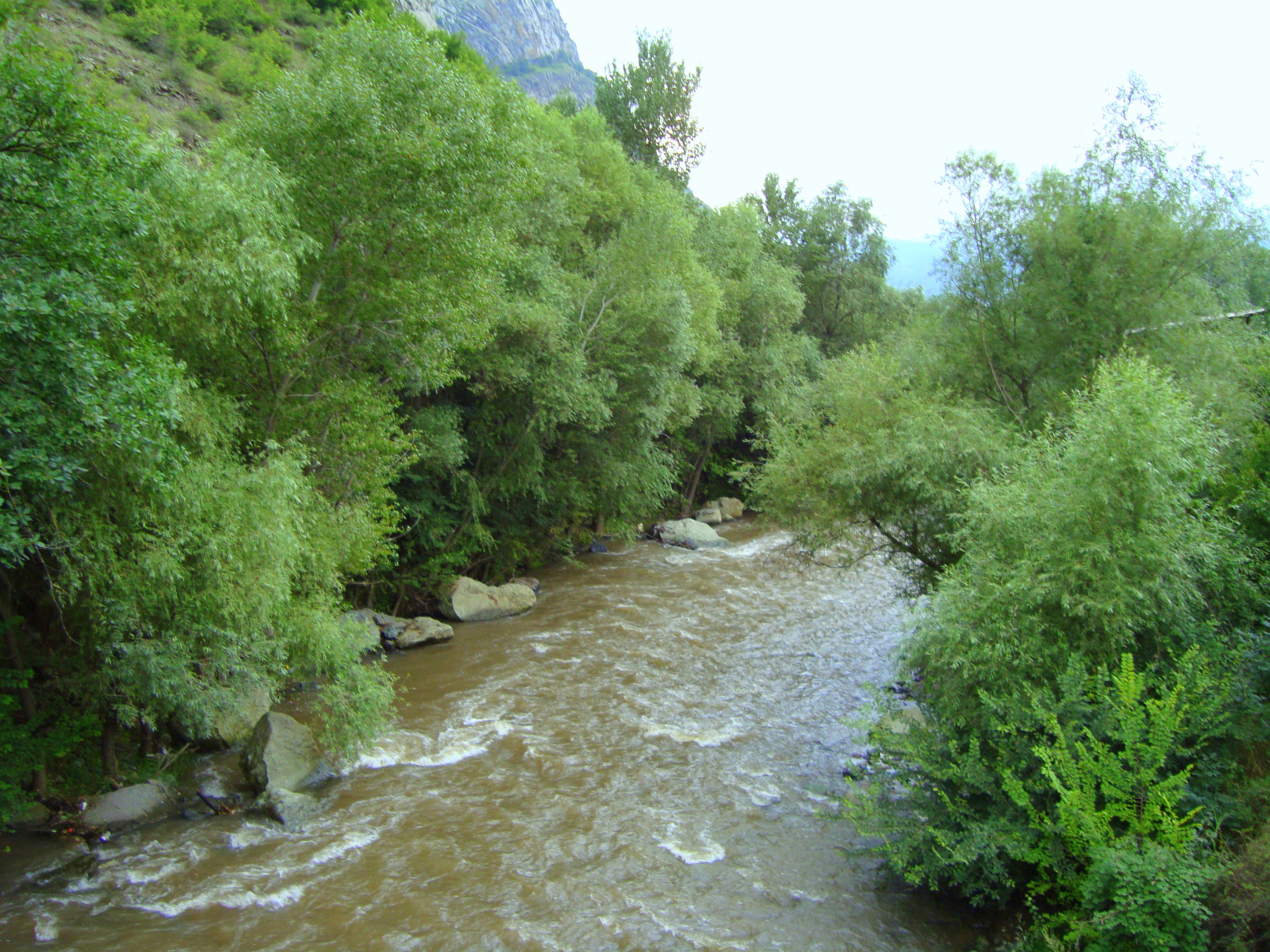
- Aghstev on the road to Dilijan

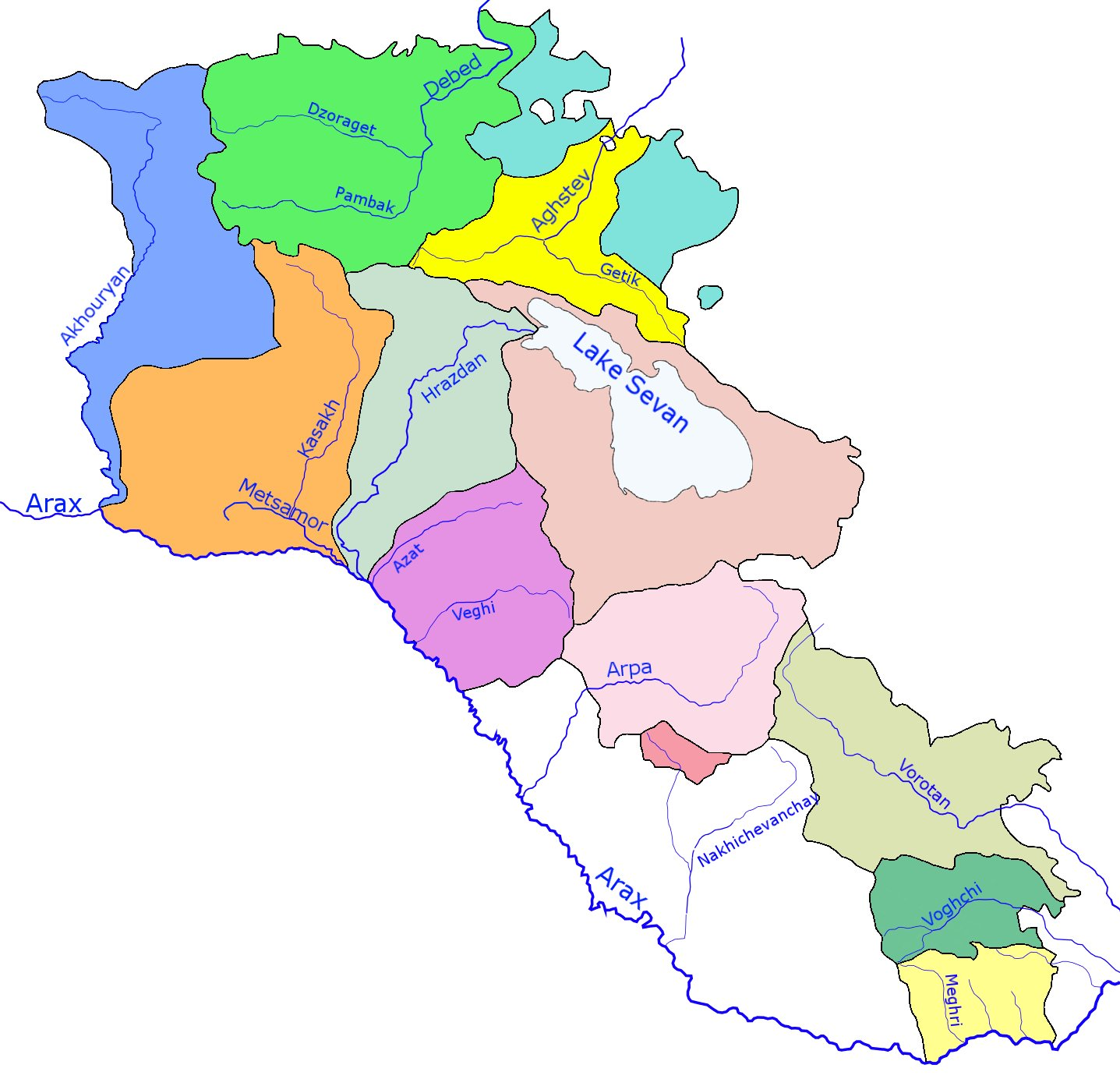
- Aghstev river and its basin (yellow) within Armenia

Location
- Country: Armenia, Azerbaijan

Physical characteristics
- Mouth: Kura
  - coordinates: 41.2320°N 45.4364°E
- Length: 121 km (75 mi)
- Basin size: 2,500 km^{2} (970 sq mi)

Basin features
- Progression: Kura→ Caspian Sea
- Tributaries
  - right: Getik

The Aghstev (Armenian: Աղստև, romanized: Aghstev) or Aghstafa (also, Aghstafachay (Azerbaijani: Ağstafaçay)) is a river in Armenia and Azerbaijan, and a right tributary of the Kura. It is 121 km (75 mi) long, and has a 2,500 km^{2} (970 sq mi) drainage basin. Along the river lie the cities of Dilijan, Ijevan in Armenia and Gazakh and Aghstafa in Azerbaijan.

== Gallery ==
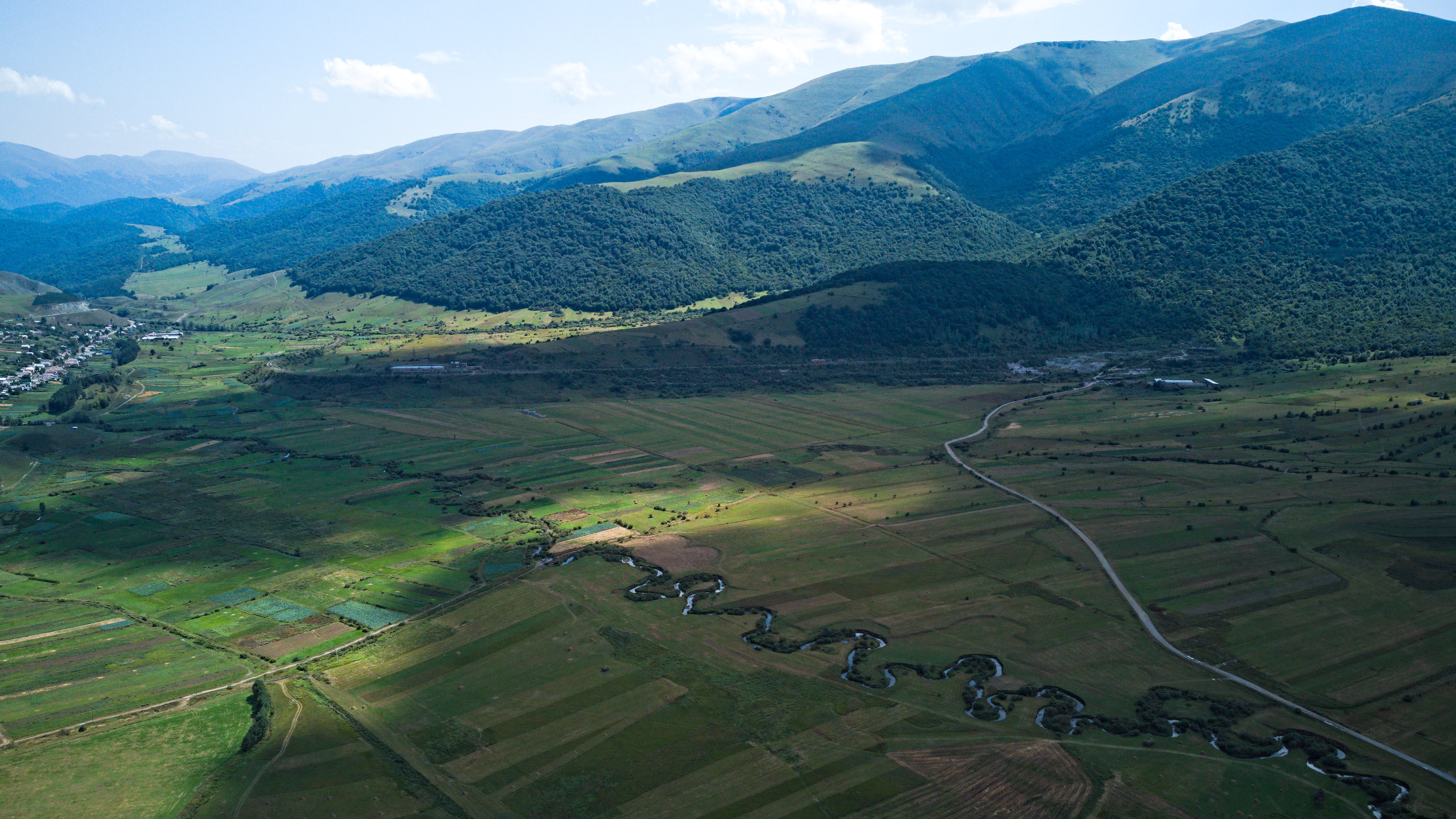
View on Aghstev river near Margahovit

== See also ==
- List of lakes of Armenia
- Rivers and lakes in Azerbaijan
- Geography of Armenia
- Geography of Azerbaijan
