= Getik (river) =

River in Armenia

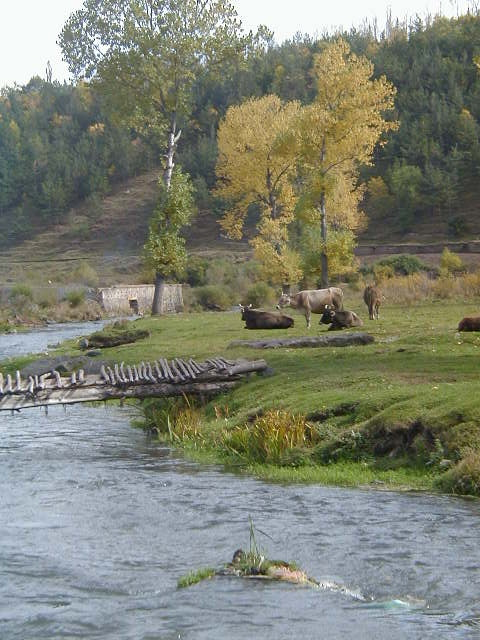
- Getik in Gherakunik, Armenia

Location
- Country: Armenia

Physical characteristics
- Mouth: Aghstafa
  - coordinates: 40.7581°N 45.0191°E
- Length: 58 km (36 mi)

Basin features
- Progression: Aghstafa→ Kura→ Caspian Sea

Getik (Armenian: Գետիկ) is a river in Armenia, a right tributary of the Aghstafa (Aghstev). It begins on the eastern slope of the Sevan ridge near the apex Kashatakh. Average incline of approximately 31.9 m/km. Nourishment is predominantly snow-rain.

Waters are used for the irrigation.

On the banks in the upper flow of river is located Chambarak city, and in the lower flow on by its right to coast - Dilijan preserve.
