= Debed =

River in Armenia

Debed Դեբեդ დებედა
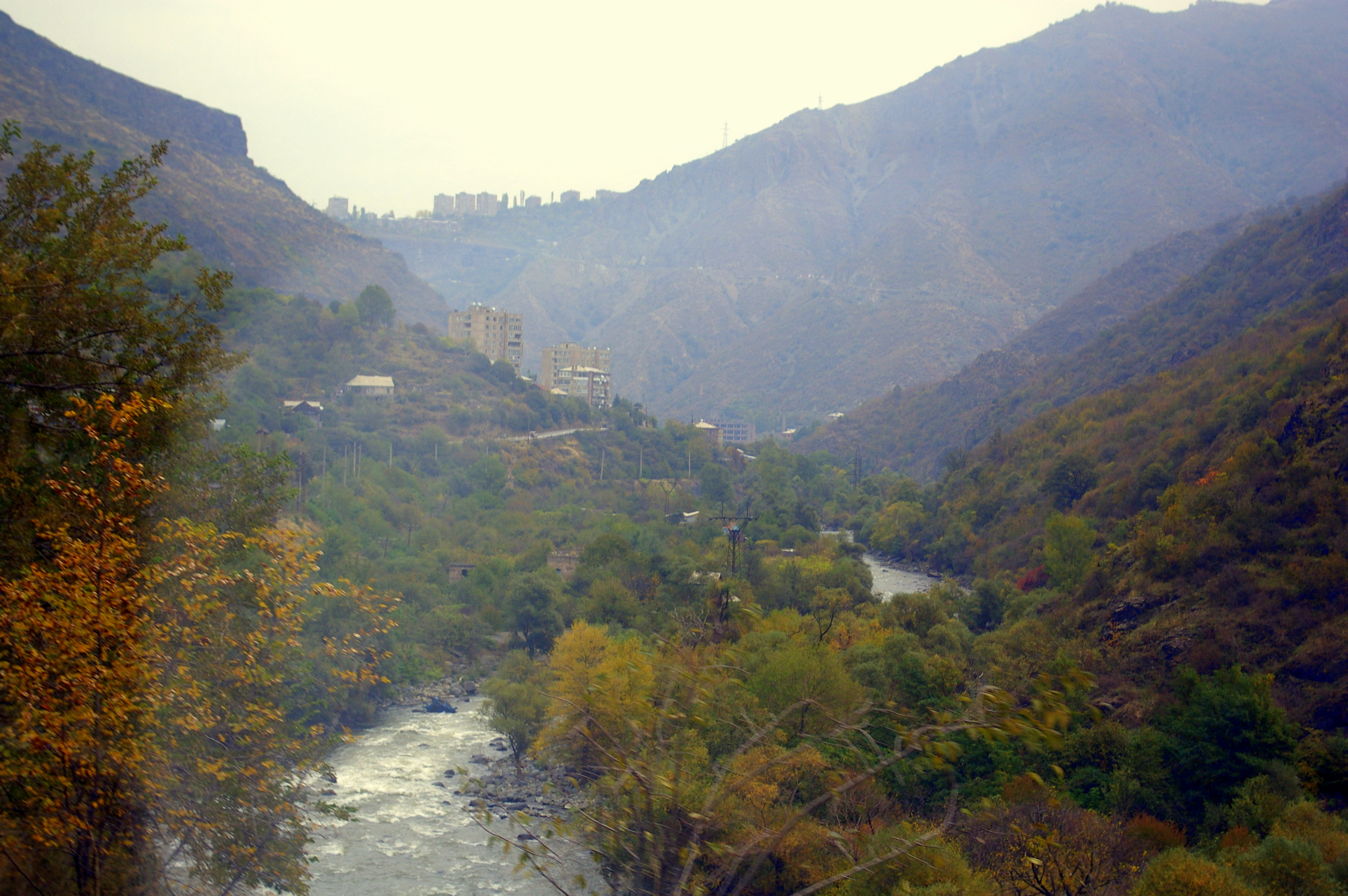
- Debed river near Alaverdi

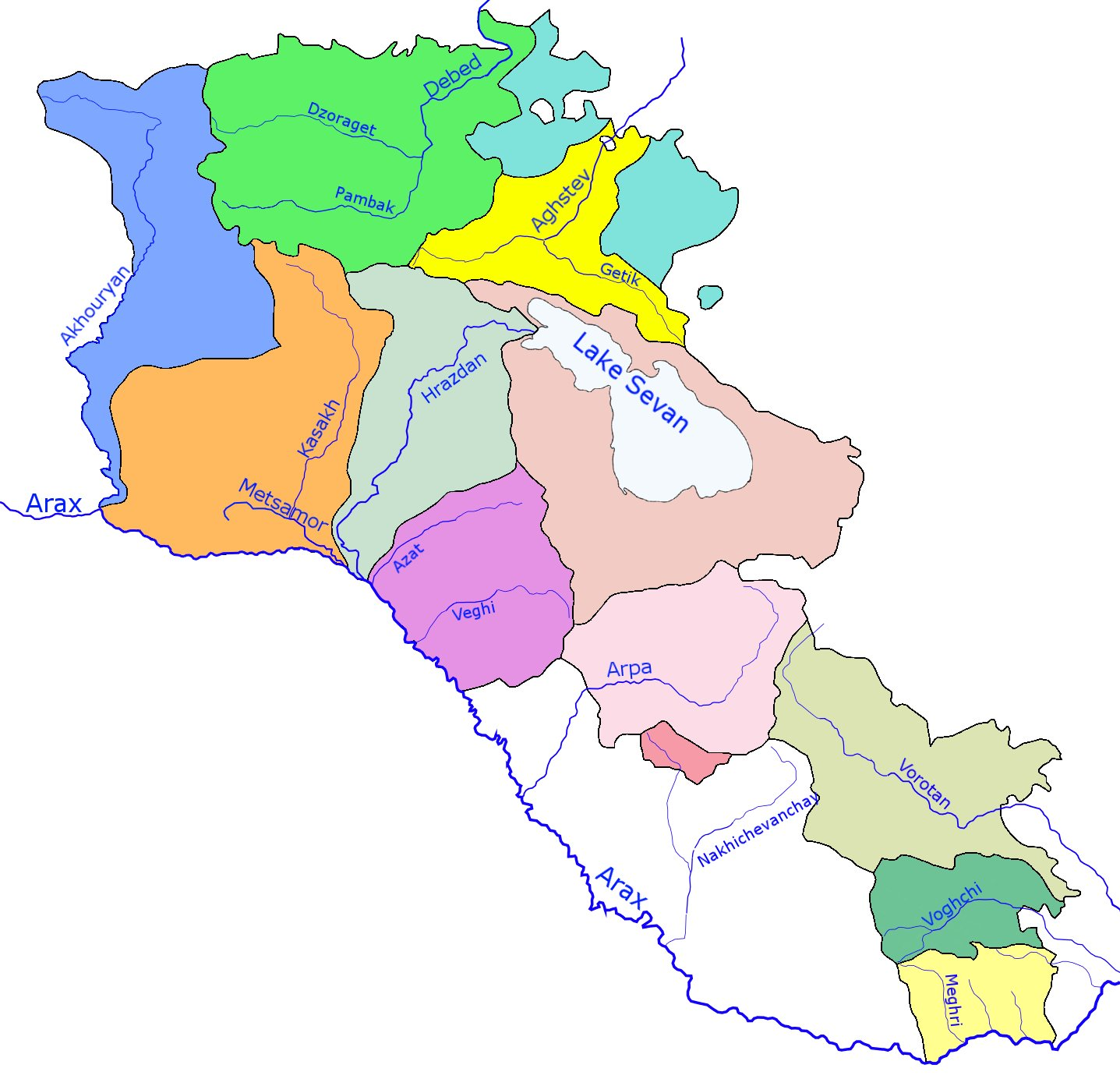
- Debed river and its basin (light green) within Armenia

Location
- Countries: Armenia and Georgia

Physical characteristics
- Source
  - elevation: 920 m (3,020 ft)
- Mouth: Khrami
  - coordinates: 41.3753°N 44.9652°E
  - elevation: 250 m (820 ft)
- Length: 176 km (109 mi)
- Basin size: 4,080 km^{2} (1,580 sq mi)

Basin features
- Progression: Khrami→ Kura→ Caspian Sea

The Debed (Armenian: Դեբեդ) or Debeda (Georgian: დებედა) is a river in Armenia and Georgia. It also serves as a natural boundary between Armenia and Georgia at the village of Sadakhlo, Georgia. The Debed is 176 km (109 mi) long, and has a 4,080 km^{2} (1,580 sq mi) drainage basin.

The river originates in Armenia and is formed at the confluence of the Dzoraget and Pambak near Dzoragyugh. It ends in Georgia, where it discharges from the left into the Khrami, a tributary of the Kura.

== See also ==
- List of lakes of Armenia
- Geography of Armenia
- Geography of Georgia
