= Dzoragyugh, Lori =

Dzoragyugh Ձորագյուղ
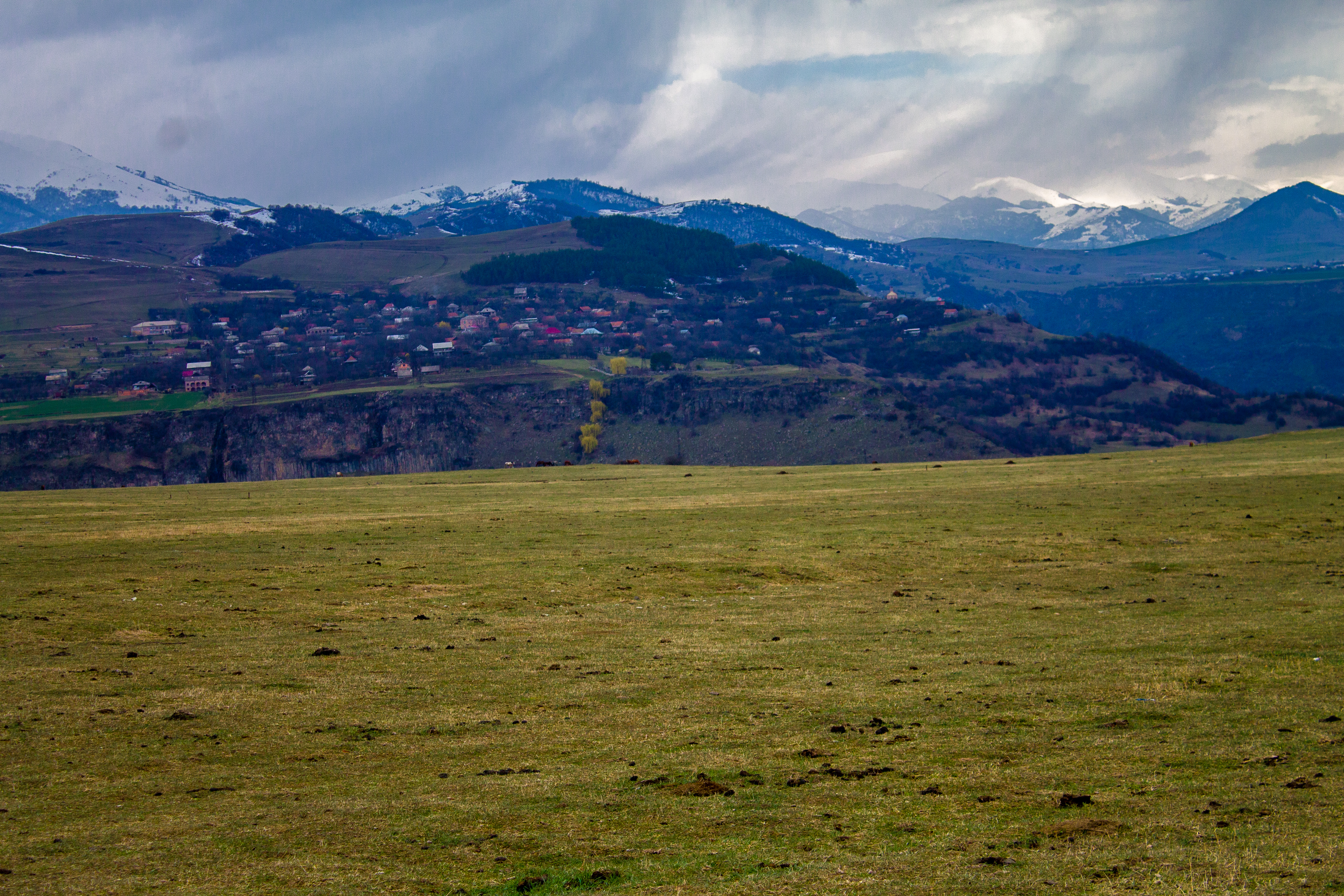

- Location within Armenia
- Coordinates: 40°57′06″N 44°36′19″E
- Country: Armenia
- Marz (Province): Lori
- Elevation: 1,250 m (4,100 ft)

Population (2011)
  - Total: 334
- Time zone: UTC+4 ( )

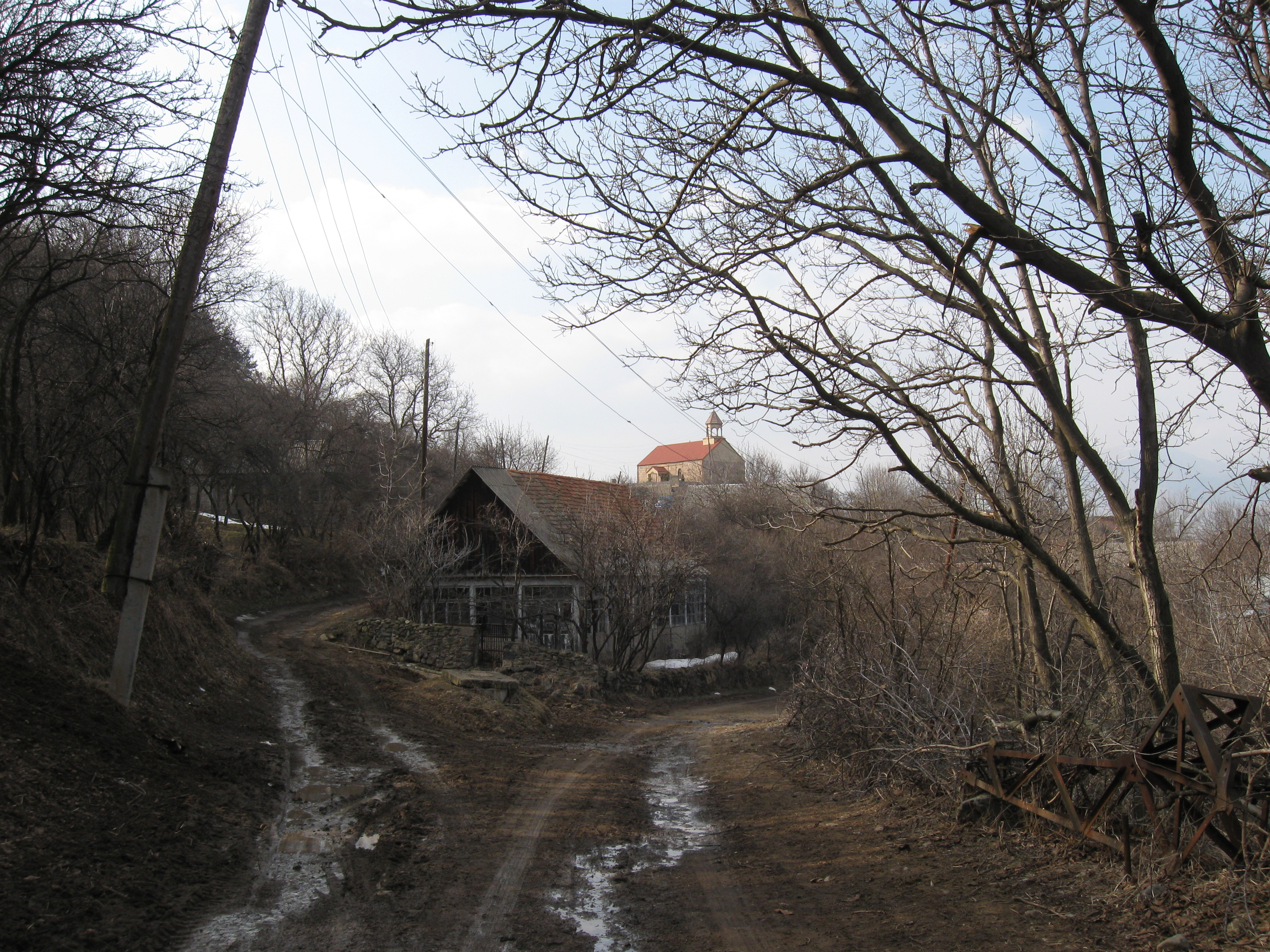
Street of Dzoragyugh

Dzoragyugh (Armenian: Ձորագյուղ) is a village in the Lori Province of Armenia.

== Development programs ==
In 2015 some programs started to be implemented in Dzoragyugh by Children of Armenia Fund. Crafts Clubs, Music and Dance Clubs, Support to Children with Learning Difficulties, Health and Lifestyle Education, School Nutrition & Brushodromes, Women Health Screenings, Support for Reproductive Health were implemented in the village. Playground, Cafeteria and Brushodrome were created and renovated in the village by COAF. On October 18, 2021, the preschool in Dzoragyugh was re-opened and renamed the Siranush Harutyunyan Preschool in Dzoragyugh, Lori Region.

== See also ==
- Lori province
- Children of Armenia Fund
