= List of lakes of Armenia =

This is a list of lakes of Armenia. Lake Sevan, in Gegharkunik Province, is the largest body of water in Armenia and the entire Caucasus region.

Armenia has one very large lake called Lake Sevan and more than 100 small mountain lakes. None of them, except Sevan and Lake Arpi, have yet been extensively studied. The water resources of the lakes amount to about 39,300,000,000 cubic metres (5.14×10^{10} cu yd), Sevan holding most of this, nearly 39,000,000,000 cubic metres (5.1×10^{10} cu yd) (before the drainage it had almost 58,000,000,000 cubic metres (7.6×10^{10} cu yd)).

Within the country's capital, Yerevan, it is possible to find small lakes, often in amusement parks.

== List ==
Name	Area (km^{2})	Province
Lake Sevan; Սևանա լիճ, Sevana lich	1,264	Gegharkunik
Lake Arpi; Արփի լիճ, Arp’i lich	220	Shirak
Akhurian Reservoir; Ախուրյանի ջրամբար, Akhuryani jrambar	54	Shirak; Kars (Turkey)
Spandaryan Reservoir; Սպանդարյանի ջրամբար, Spandaryani jrambar	10.8	Syunik
Yerevan Lake; Երևանյան լիճ, Yerevanyan lich	0.65	Yerevan
Lake Akna; Ակնա, Akna	0.5	Kotayk
Lake Kari; Քարի լիճ, K’ari lich	0.3	Aragatsotn
Lake Ayger; Այղր, Ayghr	0.16	Armavir
Lake Lessing; Լեսինգ, Lesing	0.09	Aragatsotn
Lake Parz; Պարզ լիճ, Parz lich	0.03	Tavush
Lake Gosh; Գոշ լիճ, Gosh lich	0.03	

== See also ==
- Geography of Armenia
- List of rivers of Armenia
