= Geography of Armenia =

Armenia's Köppen climate classification zones

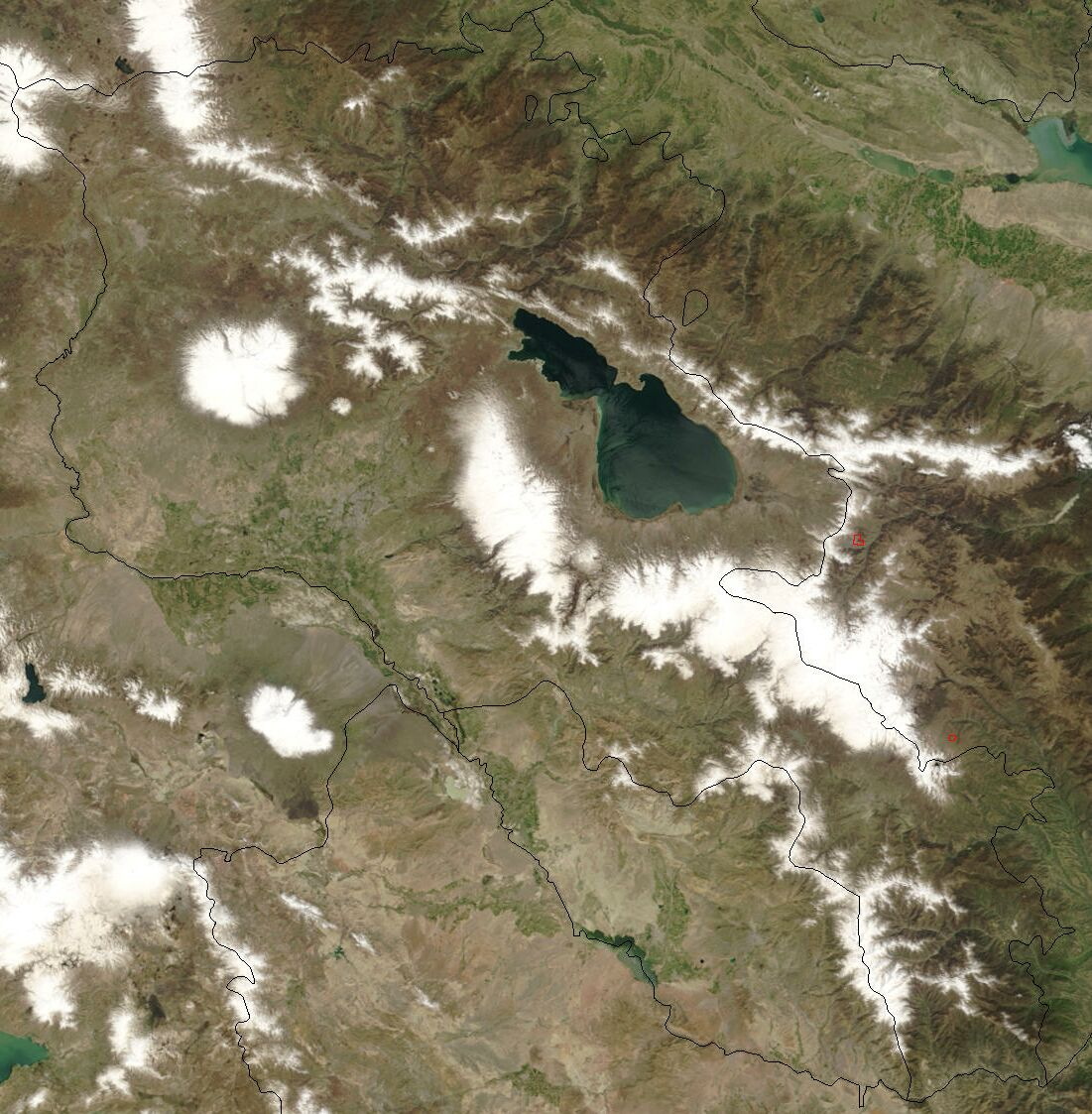
Satellite image of Armenia

Armenia is a landlocked country in the South Caucasus region of the Caucasus. The country is geographically located in West Asia, within the Armenian plateau. Armenia is bordered on the north and east by Georgia and Azerbaijan and on the south and west by Iran, Azerbaijan's exclave Nakhchivan, and Turkey.

The terrain is mostly mountainous, with fast flowing rivers and few forests. The climate is highland continental, with hot summers and cold winters. The land rises to 4,090 m (13,420 ft) above sea-level at Mount Aragats.

== Physical environment ==
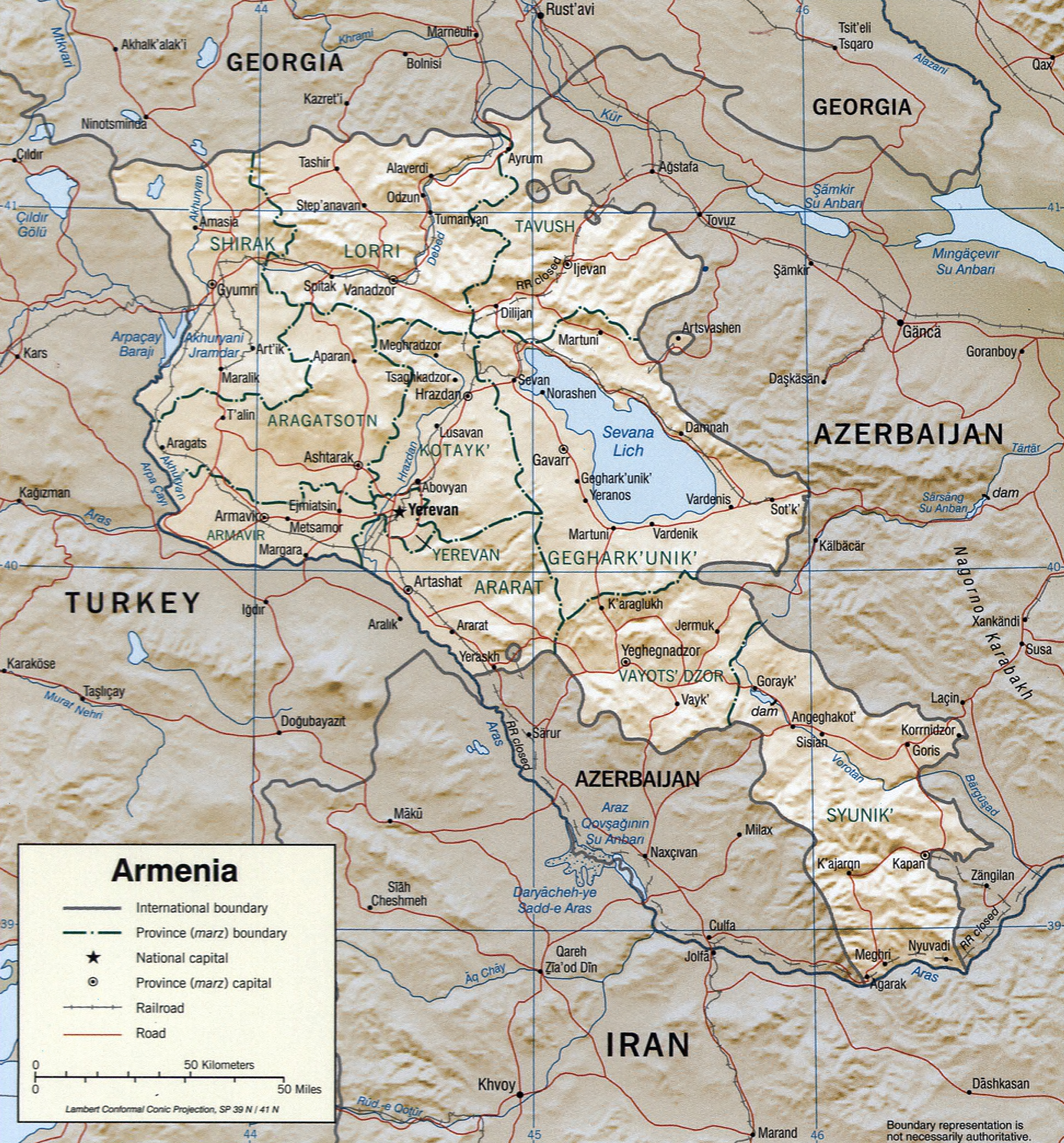
Detailed map of Armenia

Armenia is located in the southern Caucasus, the region southwest of Russia between the Black Sea and the Caspian Sea. Modern Armenia occupies part of historical Armenia, whose ancient centers were in the valley of the Araks River and the region around Lake Van in Turkey. Armenia is bordered on the north by Georgia, on the east by Azerbaijan, on the south by Iran, and on the west by Turkey.

In Armenia forest cover is around 12% of the total land area, equivalent to 328,470 hectares (ha) of forest in 2020, down from 334,730 hectares (ha) in 1990. In 2020, naturally regenerating forest covered 310,000 hectares (ha) and planted forest covered 18,470 hectares (ha). Of the naturally regenerating forest, 5% was reported to be primary forest (consisting of native tree species with no clearly visible indications of human activity) and almost none of the forest area was found within protected areas. For the year 2015, 100% of the forest area was reported to be under public ownership.

== Topography and drainage ==
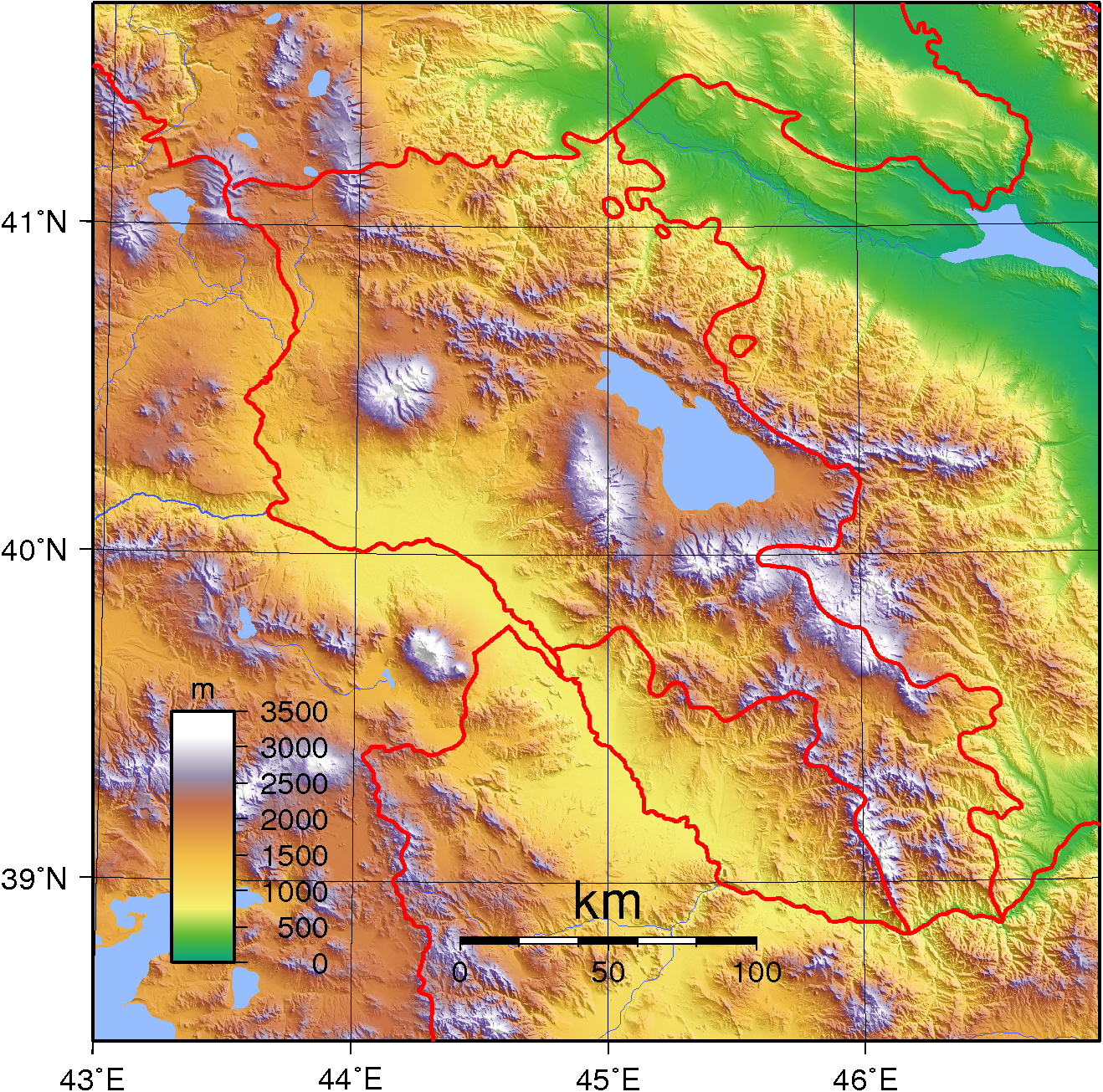
Topography of Armenia

Twenty-five million years ago, a geological upheaval pushed up the Earth's crust to form the Armenian Plateau, creating the complex topography of modern Armenia. The Lesser Caucasus range extends through northern Armenia, runs southeast between Lake Sevan and Azerbaijan, then passes roughly along the Armenian-Azerbaijani border to Iran. Thus situated, the mountains make travel from north to south difficult. Geological turmoil continues in the form of devastating earthquakes, which have plagued Armenia. In December 1988, the second largest city in the republic, Leninakan (now Gyumri), was heavily damaged by a massive quake that killed more than 25,000 people.

About half of Armenia's area of approximately 29,743 km^{2} (11,483.8 sq mi) has an elevation of at least 2,000 m (6,562 ft), and only 3% of the country lies below 650 m (2,133 ft). The lowest points are in the valleys of the Araks River and the Debed River in the far north, which have elevations of 380 and 430 m (1,247 and 1,411 ft), respectively. Elevations in the Lesser Caucasus vary between 2,640 and 3,280 m (8,661 and 10,761 ft). To the southwest of the range is the Armenian Plateau, which slopes southwestward toward the Araks River on the Turkish border. The plateau is masked by intermediate mountain ranges and extinct volcanoes. The largest of these, Mount Aragats, 4,090 meters (13,419 ft) high, is also the highest point in Armenia. Most of the population lives in the western and northwestern parts of the country, where the two major cities, Yerevan and Gyumri, are located.

The valleys of the Debed and Akstafa rivers form the chief routes into Armenia from the north as they pass through the mountains. Lake Sevan, 72.5 km (45 mi) across at its widest point and 376 km (233.6 mi) long, is by far the largest lake. It lies 1,900 m (6,234 ft) above sea level on the plateau and is 1,279.18 km^{2} (493.9 sq mi) large. Other main lakes are: Arpi, 7.5 km^{2} (2.9 sq mi), Sev, 2 km^{2} (0.8 sq mi), Akna 0.8 km^{2} (0.3 sq mi).

Biogeographic regions of Europe

Terrain is most rugged in the extreme southeast, which is drained by the Bargushat River, and most moderate in the Araks River valley to the extreme southwest. Most of Armenia is drained by the Araks or its tributary, the Hrazdan, which flows from Lake Sevan. The Araks forms most of Armenia's border with Turkey and Iran, while the Zangezur Mountains form the border between Armenia's southern province of Syunik and Azerbaijan's adjacent Nakhchivan Autonomous Republic.

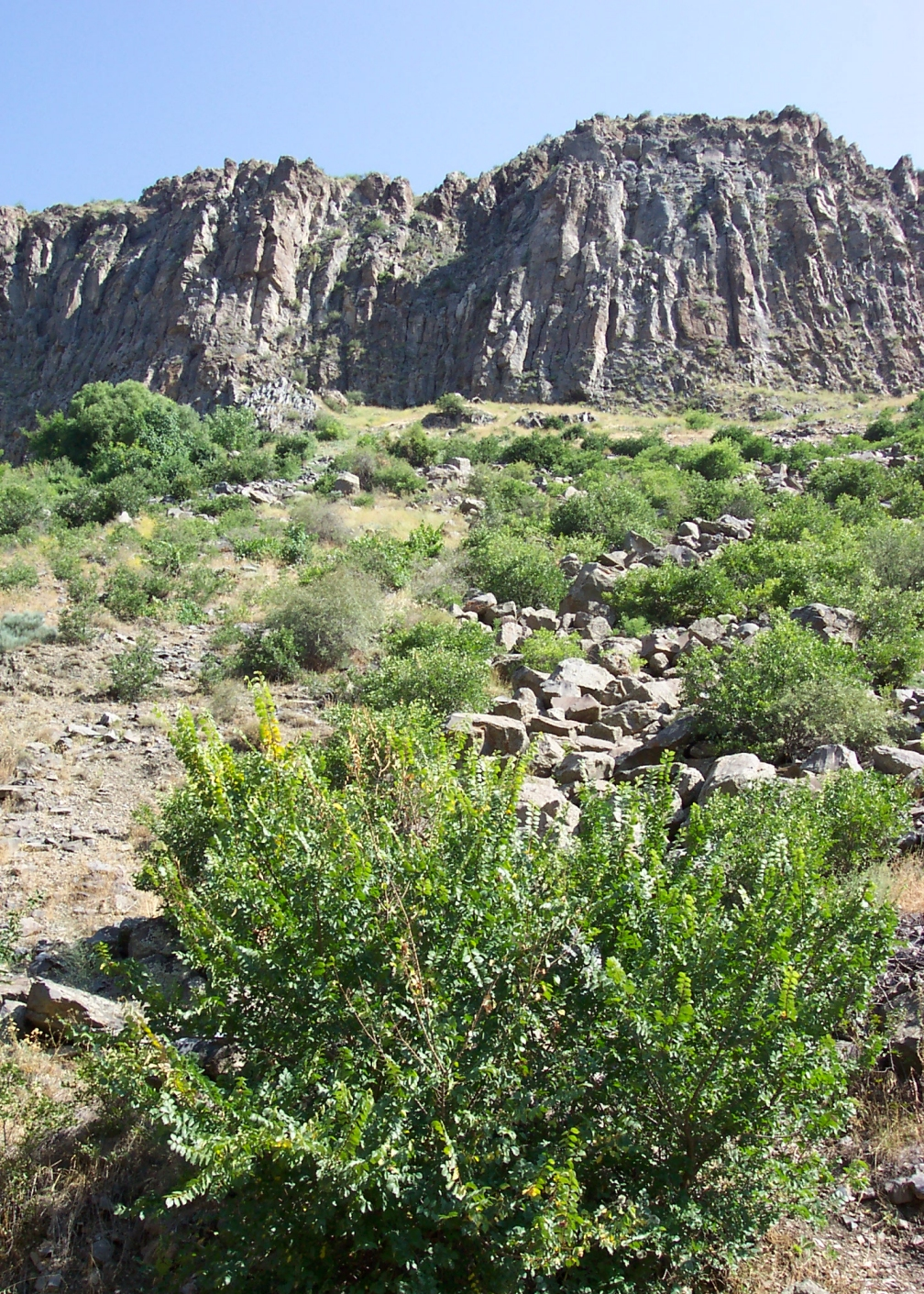
Armenian terrain

== Climate ==
Temperatures in Armenia generally depend upon elevation. Mountain formations block the moderating climatic influences of the Mediterranean Sea and the Black Sea, creating wide seasonal variations with cold snowy winters, and warm to hot summers. On the Armenian Plateau, the mean midwinter temperature is 0 °C (32 °F) to −15 °C (5 °F), and the mean midsummer temperature is 15 °C (59 °F) to 30 °C (86 °F). Average precipitation ranges from 250 millimeters (9.8 in) per year in the lower Araks River valley to 800 millimeters (31.5 in) at the highest altitudes. Despite the harshness of winter in most parts (with frosts reaching −40 °C (−40 °F) and lower in Shirak region), the fertility of the plateau's volcanic soil made Armenia one of the world's earliest sites of agricultural activity.

== Area and boundaries ==
Area:
total: 29,743 km^{2}

country comparison to the world: 143

land: 28,203 km^{2}
water: 1,540 km^{2}

Area comparative

- Australia comparative: about one third (33%) the size of Tasmania
- Canada comparative: greater than half (56%) the size of Nova Scotia
- Turkey comparative: about a quarter (24%) smaller than the size of Konya Province.
- United Kingdom comparative: about one third larger (30%) than Wales
- United States comparative: slightly smaller (7%) than Maryland
- EU comparative: slightly smaller (8%) than Belgium

Land boundaries:
total: 1,570 km
border countries:

Azerbaijan 566 km, Azerbaijan-Nakhchivan exclave 221 km, Georgia 219 km, Iran 44 km, Turkey 311 km

Coastline:

0 km (landlocked)

Elevation extremes:
lowest point: 375m
highest point: Mount Aragats 4,090 m

Extreme points of Armenia:
North: Tavush (41°17′N 45°0′E)
South: Syunik (38°49′N 46°10′E)
West: Shirak (41°5′N 43°27′E)
East: Syunik (39°13′N 46°37′E)

== Resources and land use ==
Natural resources: deposits of gold, copper, molybdenum, zinc, bauxite

Armenia has significant deposits of copper, molybdenum and gold, as well as smaller deposits of zinc, lead and silver. Some copper-molybdenum and polymetallic ore deposits are rich in elements such as bismuth, tellurium, selenium, gallium, indium, thallium, rhenium and germanium.

Land use:
arable land:4.456 km², 15.8%
permanent crops: 1.9%
permanent pastures: 4.2%
forest (2018): 11.2%
other: 31.2% (2011)

Irrigated land: 2.084 km^{2} (2018)

Total renewable water resources:

7.77 m^{3} (2011) Lake Sevan contains the largest amount of water in the country.

Freshwater withdrawal (domestic/industrial/agricultural):
total: 2.86 km^{3}/yr (40%/6%/54%)
per capita: 929.7 m^{3}/yr (2010)

== See also ==
- Atlas of Armenia
- Biogeographic regions of Europe
- Geography of Asia
- Geography of Europe
- Geology of Armenia
