= Khrami =

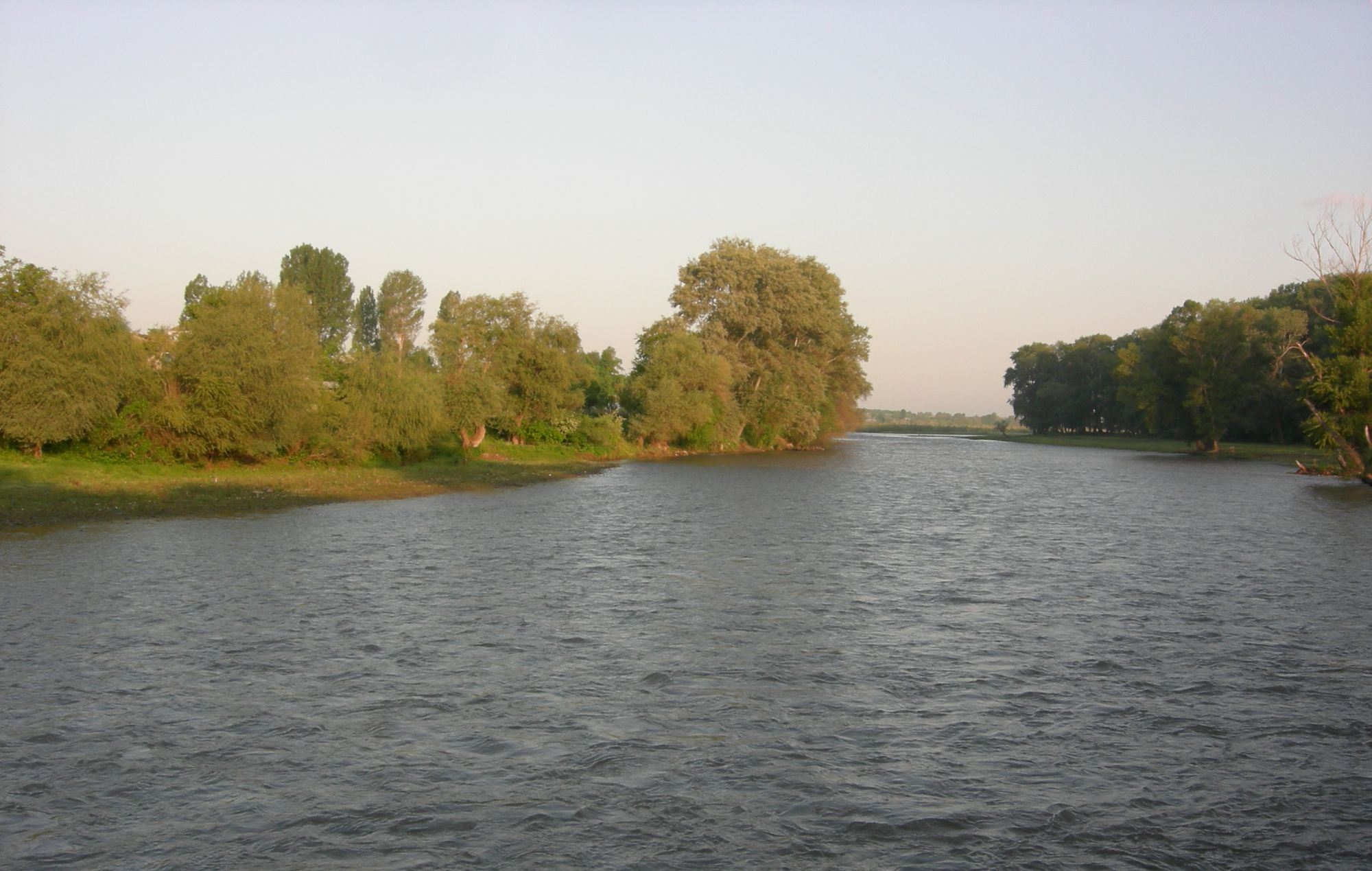
- The Khrami near Kirach Muganlo, Georgia

- Native name: ხრამი (Georgian); Anaxatır (Azerbaijani)

Location
- Countries: Georgia and Azerbaijan
- Region: Caucasus

Physical characteristics
- Source: Lesser Caucasus
  - location: Trialeti Range, Georgia
- Mouth: Kura
  - location: Muğanlı, Agstafa, Azerbaijan
  - coordinates: 41°18′55″N 45°07′31″E
- Length: 201 km (125 mi)
- Discharge
  - location: directly downstream into Kura

Basin features
- Progression: Kura→ Caspian Sea
- Tributaries
  - left: Debed, Mashavera

The Khrami (Georgian: ხრამი) or Anakhatir (Azerbaijani: Anaxatır), in its upper course Ktsia, is a river in eastern Georgia and western Azerbaijan, and a right tributary of the Kura (Mtkvari). It is 201 km (125 mi) long, and has a drainage basin of 8,340 km^{2} (3,220 sq mi). The Khrami originates in the Trialeti Range and flows into a deep valley. It is fed primarily by snow melt. Its main tributaries are the Debed (left) and Mashavera (right) rivers. The Tsalka Reservoir and three hydroelectric power plants are built on the Khrami.

== See also ==
- Samshvilde Canyon Natural Monument
