= List of bridges in Armenia =

This list of bridges in Armenia lists bridges of particular historical, scenic, architectural or engineering interest. Road and railway bridges, viaducts, aqueducts and footbridges are included.

== Historical and architectural interest bridges ==
	Name	Armenian	Distinction	Length	Type	Carries Crosses	Opened	Location	Province	Ref.
1	Kapan Medieval Bridge	Միջնադարյան կամուրջ Կապանում	Monument ID 9.1/10.4		Masonry; 1 arch	Footbridge; Tsav River	871	Tsav	Syunik	
2	Lori Berd Bridge	Լոռի բերդի կամուրջ	Monument ID 7.44/12.2.6		Masonry; 1 arch	Footbridge; Urut River	11th century	Lori Berd; 41°00′15.0″N 44°25′52.2″E	Lori	
3	Azat River Bridge	Ազատ կամուրջ	Monument ID 6.21/20		Masonry; 1 arch	Footbridge; Azat River	11th century	Garni; 40°06′58.6″N 44°44′33.6″E	Kotayk	
4	Sanahin Bridge	Սանահինի կամուրջ	Monument ID 7.2/23	60 m (200 ft)	Masonry; 1 arch	Footbridge; Debed	1195	Alaverdi; 41°05′56.5″N 44°39′27.1″E	Lori	
5	Akhurian River Bridge in ruins	Անիի կամուրջ	Armenia–Turkey border Span : 30 m (98 ft)		Masonry; 1 arch	Out of order Akhurian River	13th century	Ani; 40°30′15.4″N 43°34′22.6″E	Shirak; Turkey	
6	Agarakadzor Bridge	Ագարակաձոր կամուրջ	Monument ID 11.4/10		Masonry; 1 arch	Footbridge; Arpa	13th century	Agarakadzor; 39°44′28.4″N 45°19′28.8″E	Vayots Dzor	
7	Yaghdan Bridge	Յաղդան Կամուրջ	Monument ID 7.79/10		Masonry; 1 arch	Footbridge; Yaghdanjur River	13th century	Yaghdan; 41°00′30.3″N 44°30′50.1″E	Lori	
8	Sranots Bridge	Սրանոցի Կամուրջ	Monument ID 10.8/6.9		Masonry; 1 arch	Footbridge; Kirants River	14th century	Acharkut	Tavush	
9	Ashtarak Bridge	Աշտարակ կամուրջ	Monument ID 2.1/21		Masonry; 3 arches	Road bridge Kasagh River	1664	Ashtarak; 40°17′54.1″N 44°22′05.5″E	Aragatsotn	
10	Red Bridge, Yerevan in ruins	Կարմիր կամուրջ	Monument ID 1.6/84	87 m (285 ft)	Masonry; 4 pointed arches	Road bridge Out of order Hrazdan River	1679	Yerevan; Kentron; 40°10′18.3″N 44°30′00.0″E	Yerevan	
11	Oshakan Bridge	Օշականի կամուրջը	Monument ID 2.113/24		Masonry; 5 arches (3 pointed arches)	Road bridge H19; Kasagh River	1706	Oshakan; 40°15′23.4″N 44°18′52.5″E	Aragatsotn	
12	Melik Tangi Bridge	Կամուրջ Մելիք Թանգի	Monument ID 9.78/3		Masonry; 1 pointed arch	Road bridge Vorotan	1855	Vorotnavan; 39°29′02.6″N 46°08′22.0″E	Syunik	
13	Victory Bridge, Yerevan	Հաղթանակի կամուրջ	Monument ID 1.6/85	200 m (660 ft)	Arch bridge Concrete deck arch	Road bridge Hrazdan River	1945	Yerevan; Kentron; 40°10′29.2″N 44°29′58.9″E	Yerevan	
14	Hrazdan Gorge Aqueduct	Հրազդանի Ձորի ջրանցույց	Monument ID 1.6/156	100 m (330 ft)	Masonry	Aqueduct; Hrazdan River	1950	Yerevan; Kentron; 40°10′43.4″N 44°29′53.9″E	Yerevan	
15	Khndzoresk Suspension Bridge	Խնձորեսկի ճոճվող կամուրջ	Span : 160 m (520 ft); Height : 63 m (207 ft)	160 m (520 ft)	Suspension; Steel	Footbridge; Khor Dzor	2012	Khndzoresk; 39°30′02.7″N 46°25′58.7″E	Syunik	

Name	Locality	Date	Image	Notes
Areni Bridge	Areni	13the century		Spans the Arpa River
Tsakhats Kar Bridge	Shatin	13th-14the centuries		Spans the Yeghegis River
Tsatur Bridge	Shatin	1666		Spans the Yeghegis River
Vayk Bridge	Vayk	17th century		Spans the Arpa River

== Major road and railway bridges ==
This table presents the structures with greatest spans of Armenia (non-exhaustive list).

	Name	Armenian	Span	Length	Type	Carries Crosses	Opened	Location	Province	Ref.
1	Nor Hachn Bridge	Նոր Հաճընի կամուրջը	160 m (520 ft)	636 m (2,087 ft)	Truss; Steel; V-shaped legs	Road-rail bridge H5; Masis-Nurnus rail line Hrazdan River	1981	Nor Hachn - Arzni; 39°50′17.3″N 45°40′18.8″E	Kotayk	
2	Jermuk Bridge	Ջերմուկ, կամուրջ	120 m (390 ft)	168 m (551 ft)	Arch; Steel deck arch	Road bridge H42; Arpa	1972	Jermuk; 39°50′17.3″N 45°40′18.8″E	Vayots Dzor	
3	Great Bridge of Hrazdan	Հրազդանի Մեծ կամուրջ	115 m (377 ft)	335 m (1,099 ft)	Arch; Concrete deck arch	Road bridge Kievyan Street - Leningradian Street; Hrazdan River	1956	Yerevan; Arabkir - Ajapnyak; 40°11′29.0″N 44°28′56.4″E	Yerevan	
4	Ashtarak Highway Bridge	Աշտարակ կամուրջ	84 m (276 ft)	368 m (1,207 ft)	Beam; Steel, orthotropic deck 63+84+63; Twin bridges	Highway bridge M1; Kasagh River	1994; 2003	Ashtarak; 40°17′54.3″N 44°22′23.9″E	Tavush	
5	Davtashen Bridge	Դավթաշենի կամուրջ	80 m (260 ft) (x3)	496 m (1,627 ft)	Beam; Steel, orthotropic deck 48+3x80+64 Twin bridges	Road bridge Sasna Tzrer Street - Vaghrshyan Street; Hrazdan River	2000	Yerevan; Davtashen - Arabkir; 40°12′34.2″N 44°29′36.8″E	Yerevan	
6	Stepanavan Bridge	Ստեփանավանի կամուրջ	63 m (207 ft) (x3)	237 m (778 ft)	Beam; Steel, orthotropic deck 18+63x3+18 Twin bridges	Highway bridge M3; Dzoraget River	1989	Stepanavan; 41°00′49.7″N 44°23′06.4″E	Lori	
7	Meghri Bridge	Մեղրիի կամուրջ	63 m (207 ft) (x3)	208 m (682 ft)	Beam; Steel	Highway bridge M2; Aras	1995	Meghri - Nordooz; 38°51′06.3″N 46°12′06.0″E	Syunik; Iran	

== See also ==
- Geography of Armenia
- Rail transport in Armenia
- Transport in Armenia

== Notes and references ==
- Notes
- Nicolas Janberg. "International Database for Civil and Structural Engineering". Structurae.com.
- Others references
