= Sanahin Bridge =

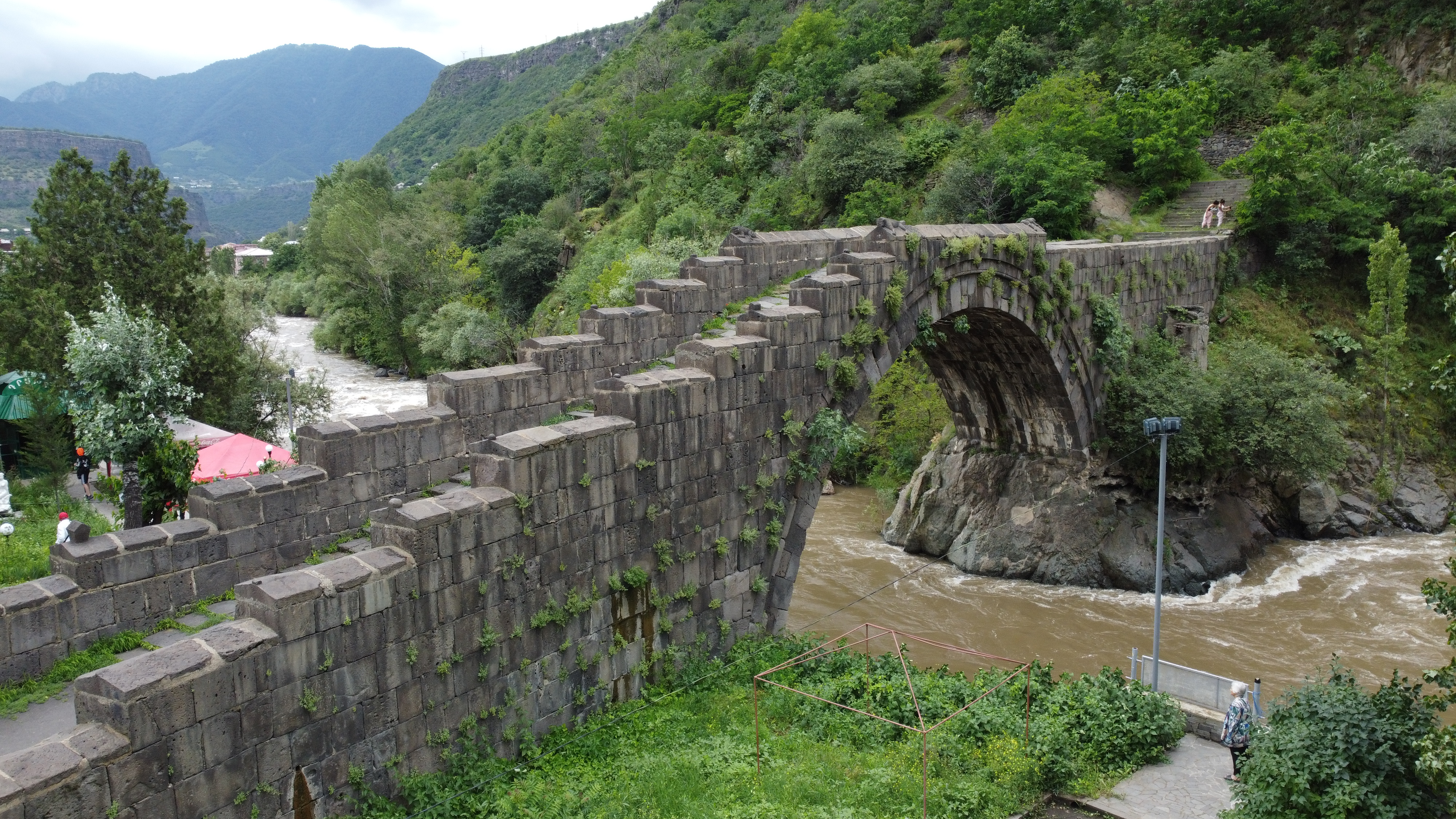
- Coordinates: 41°05′56″N 44°39′27″E
- Crosses: Debed River
- Locale: Alaverdi, Lori Province, Armenia
- Maintained by: Armenian Ministry of Culture
- Heritage status

UNESCO World Heritage Site
- Official name: Monasteries of Haghpat and Sanahin
- Type: Cultural
- Criteria: ii, iv
- Designated: 1996, 2000 (20th and 24th sessions)
- Reference no.: 777-003
- Region: Western Asia

Characteristics
- Material: Basalt
- Longest span: 18.6 m (61 ft)
- No. of spans: 1
- Clearance below: 13.5 m (44 ft)

History
- Constructed by: Queen Vaneni Zakarian
- Construction start: 1192
- Rebuilt: 1888, 1928–29, 1939–40, 1955, 1976–77

Location
- Interactive map of Sanahin Bridge

The Sanahin Bridge (Note: Armenian: Սանահինի or Սանահնի կամուրջ, Sanahini or Sanahni kamurj.) is a medieval stone arch bridge spanning the Debed River in Alaverdi in the northern Armenian province of Lori. Built in the late 12th century, it is considered one of the most remarkable bridges of medieval Armenia. Though largely intact, it has undergone multiple restorations since the late 19th century. Until the 1960s, the bridge was used for motor transport, but it has since been converted into a pedestrian-only walkway.

It is a UNESCO World Heritage Site along with Sanahin Monastery, to which it has close links, and the nearby Haghpat Monastery. A historic landmark of Lori and a symbol of Alaverdi, it is featured on the town's coat of arms. Locally, it is often referred to as simply "The Stone Bridge". (Note: Armenian: Քարե կամուրջը, K’are kamurjë.)

== Foundation ==
The bridge was commissioned by Queen Vaneni (Nana) in honor of her prematurely deceased husband Abas II of the Kiurikian (Kwirikid) family, a branch of the Bagratunis (Bagratids). Abas was the last king of Lori (Tashir-Dzoraget), while Vaneni was the sister of Ivane and Zakare Zakarians, senior officials in the court of Tamar of Georgia. She left a 12-line inscription about commissioning the bridge on the back of a khachkar, originally placed prominently on its left side, on a high pedestal. (Note: The khachkar has been transferred to Sanahin Monastery for preservation. The top of the khachkar is missing. According to a contemporary record by Hovsep Arghutian, it was damaged by the forces of Agha Mohammad Khan Qajar of Iran during his 1795 campaign. The lost section may have contained the date of its erection.) While the exact construction date is uncertain, scholars estimate that Abas Kiurikian died in 1192, and the bridge was built shortly after. Its date is typically cited as 1192 (Note: The government-approved list of monuments and the Culture Ministry list 1195.) or the late 12th century.

Vaneni possessed great wealth and is a noteworthy female figure of medieval Armenia. Antony Eastmond suggested that building roads and bridges – infrastructure required to promote trade – formed part of women's patronage. Zaroui Pogossian added that in the inscription, Vaneni "claimed the royal prerogatives of her husband for herself" since, according to the contemporary jurist Mkhitar Gosh, the construction of bridges was the "prerogative of kings". Thus, she may have been affirming her role as a queen after her husband's death.

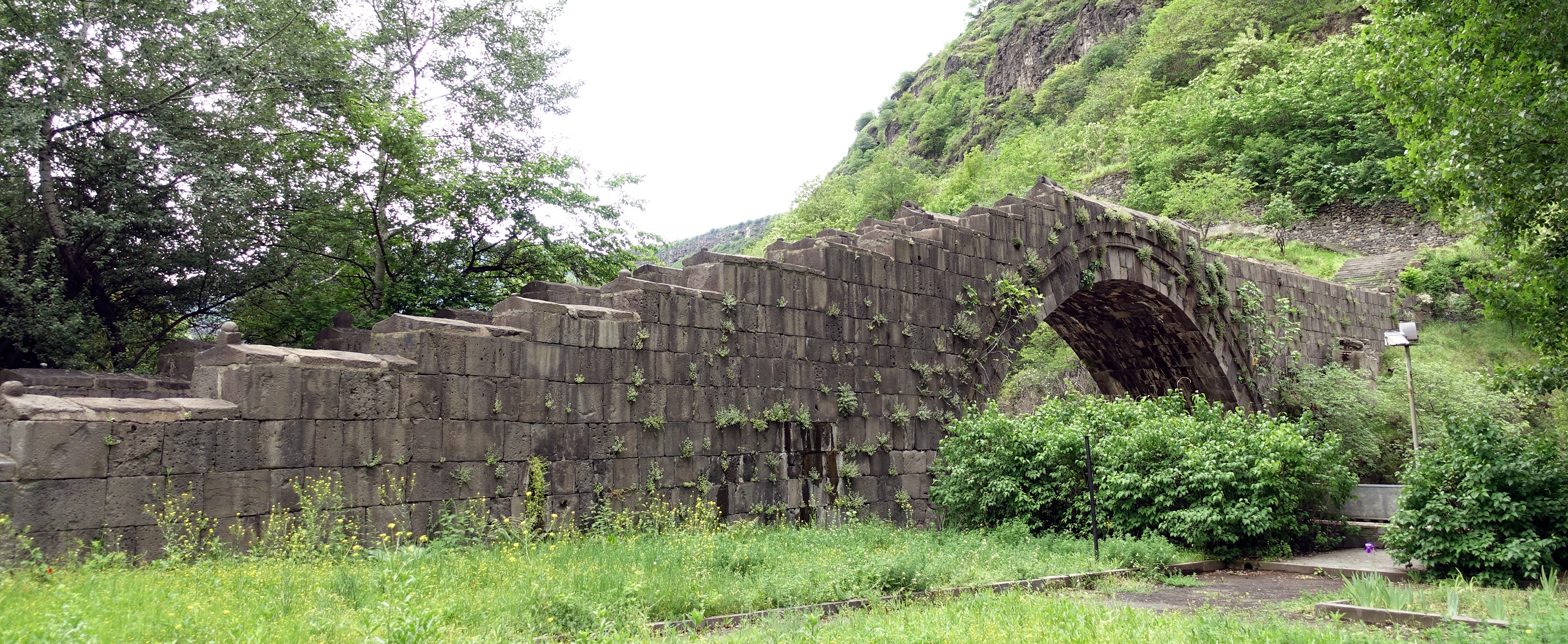

== Description ==
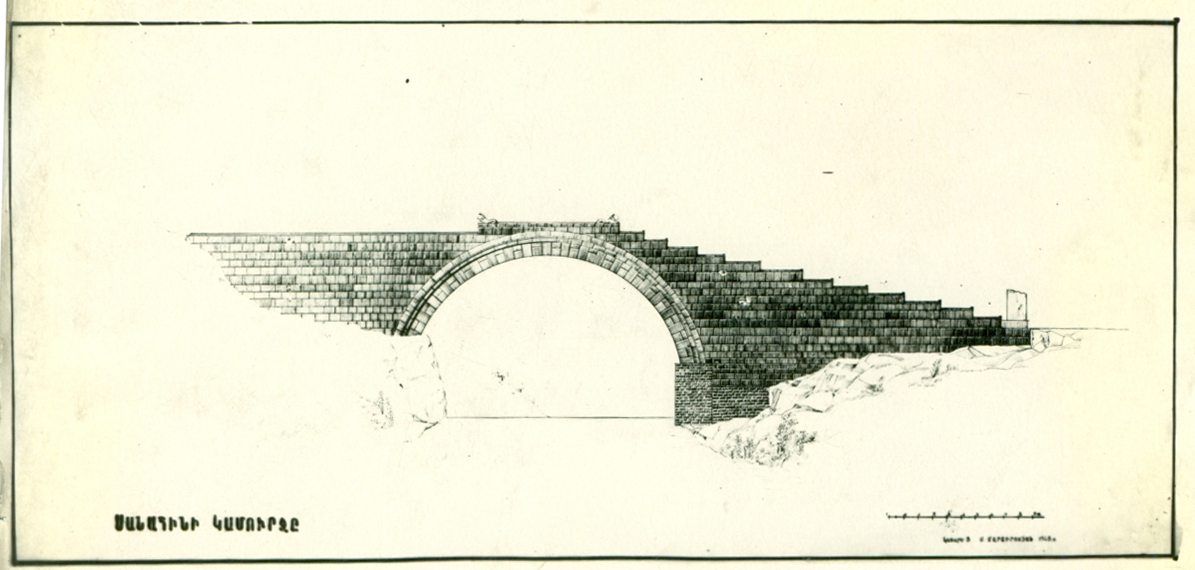
A technical drawing of the bridge

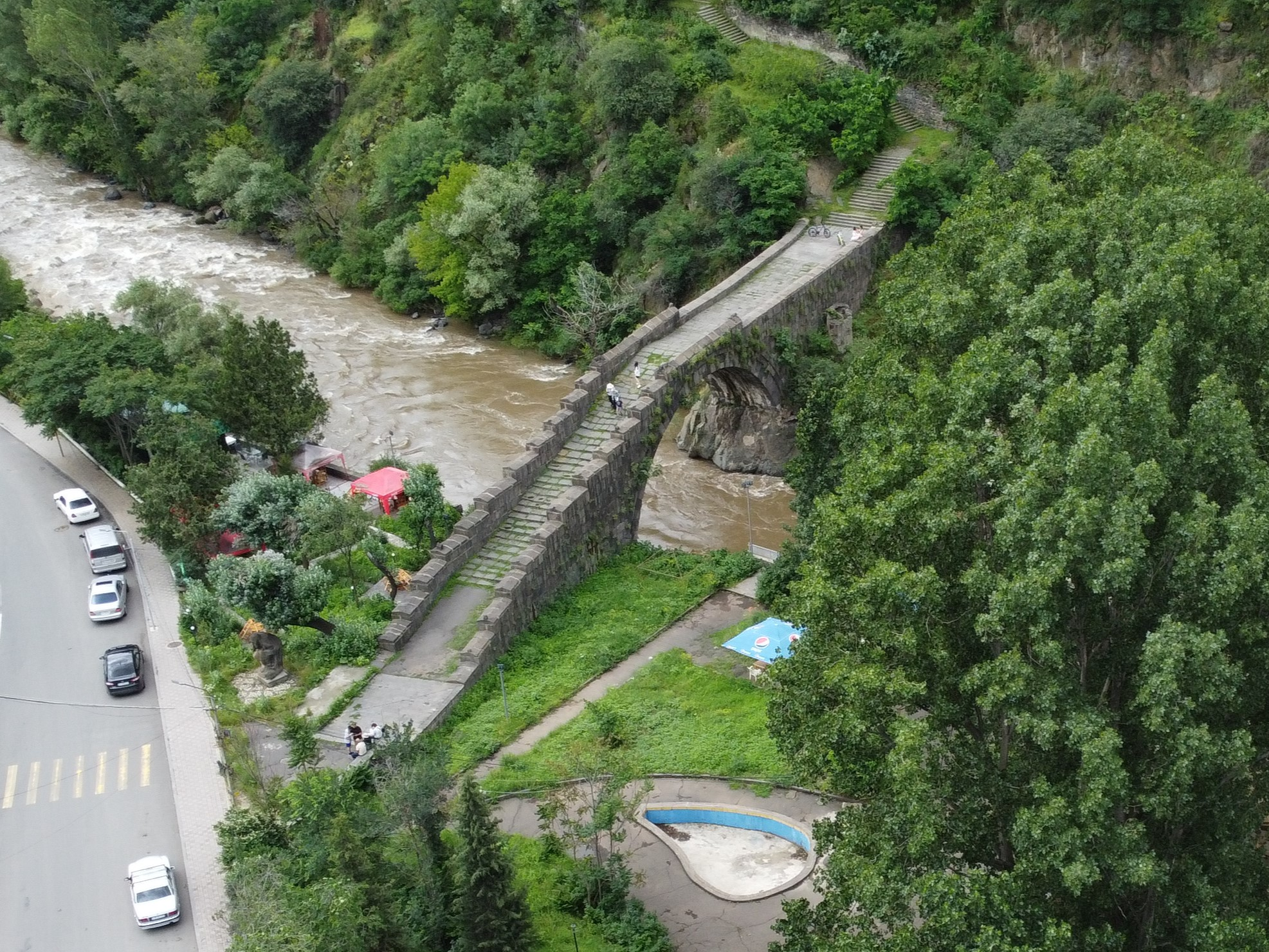
An aerial view

Located near the center of Alaverdi, the bridge was, until the 20th century, the only connection to the village and monastery of Sanahin, which was incorporated into Alaverdi during the Soviet period. Built from finely hewn basalt stones and reinforced with lime mortar, it is an arch bridge with a single 18.6 m (61 ft) long span. (Note: Older sources provide 18 m (59 ft) or 17.5 m (57 ft).) It has a total length of 60 m (200 ft) and a width of 3.3–3.5 m (10.8–11.5 ft) at its center. Its span rises around 13.5 m (44 ft) from water level.

It is built at the gorge's narrowest section, where the left bank sits significantly lower than the right. To adapt to the uneven landscape, the bridge features a stepped transition and parapets from the lower left bank to the higher right bank, with a horizontal position at the arch's peak. The right abutment rests on a rocky solid outcrop, while the left one is anchored to an earthen mass through an inclined passage. In 1977, the bridge's stepped roadway—previously filled to support motor transport—was restored to its original form. Nikolai Tokarsky argued that the architect skillfully used the challenges of crossing the river in a difficult terrain "to avoid stonework in the cold waters of the mountain river and to reduce the volume of masonry." Varazdat Harutyunyan wrote that its architecturally unique forms are harmonized with the picturesque environment of the gorge.

The bridge contains decoration in the form of double arch bands and four lion sculptures symbolizing guardianship, placed at the four corners of the horizontal parapet. They have significantly worn down over time. These lions are considered emblems of the Kiurikians.

== Conservation ==
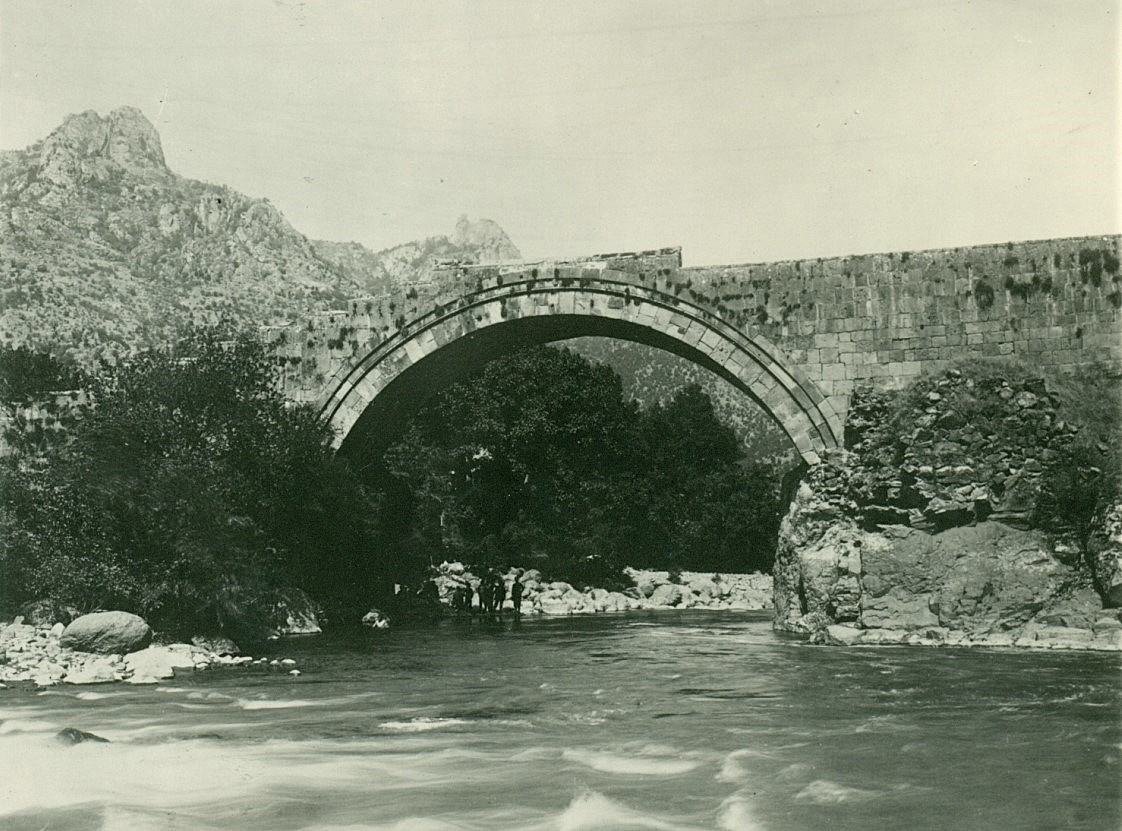
The bridge in 1947

The bridge is a national monument protected by the state. In 2000 the bridge was inscribed as a UNESCO World Heritage Site along with the Sanahin Monastery, with which it has "close cultural links." The property also includes the nearby Haghpat Monastery, which had been inscribed in 1996. Its protective area is 0.2 hectares (0.49 acres).

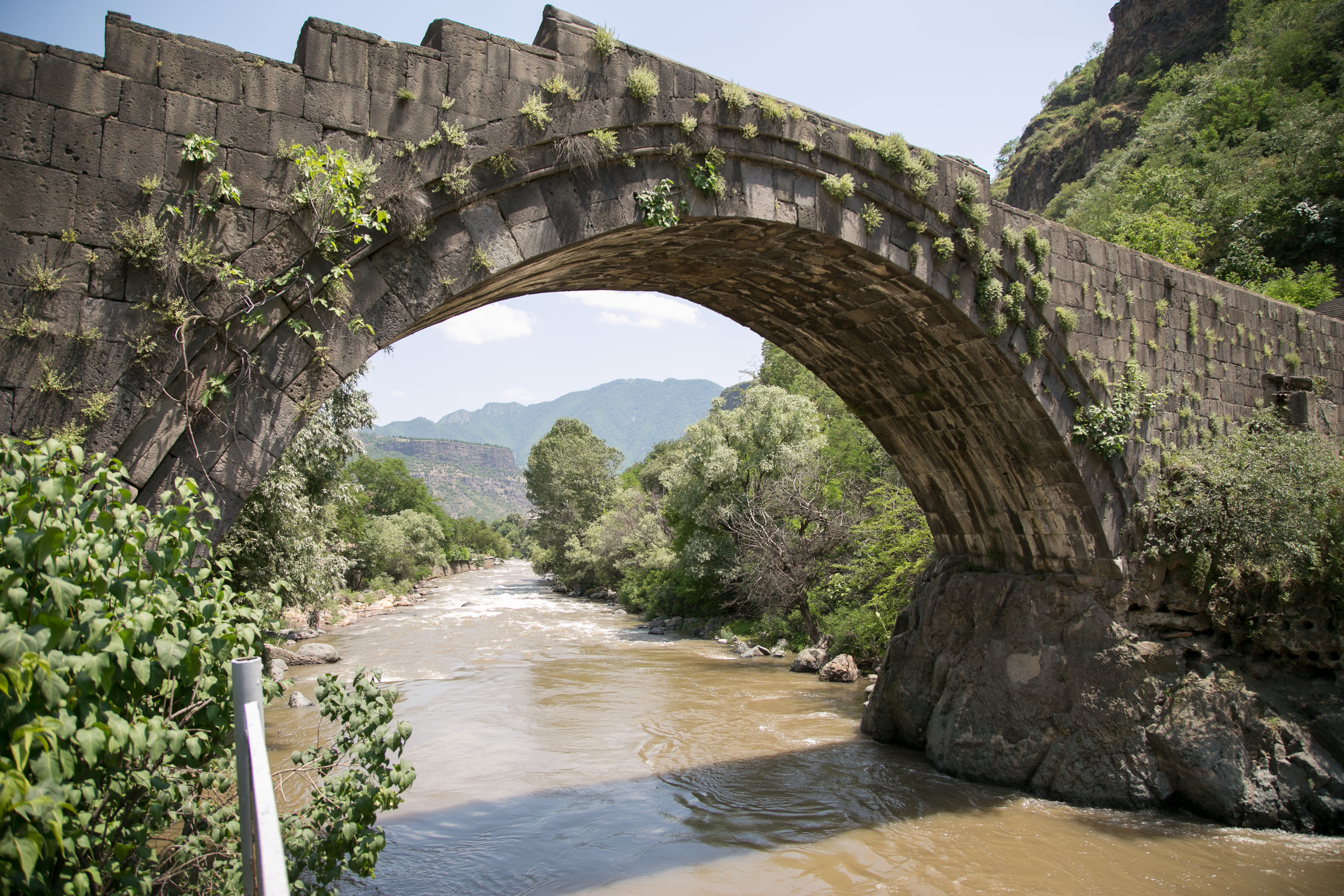
The arch

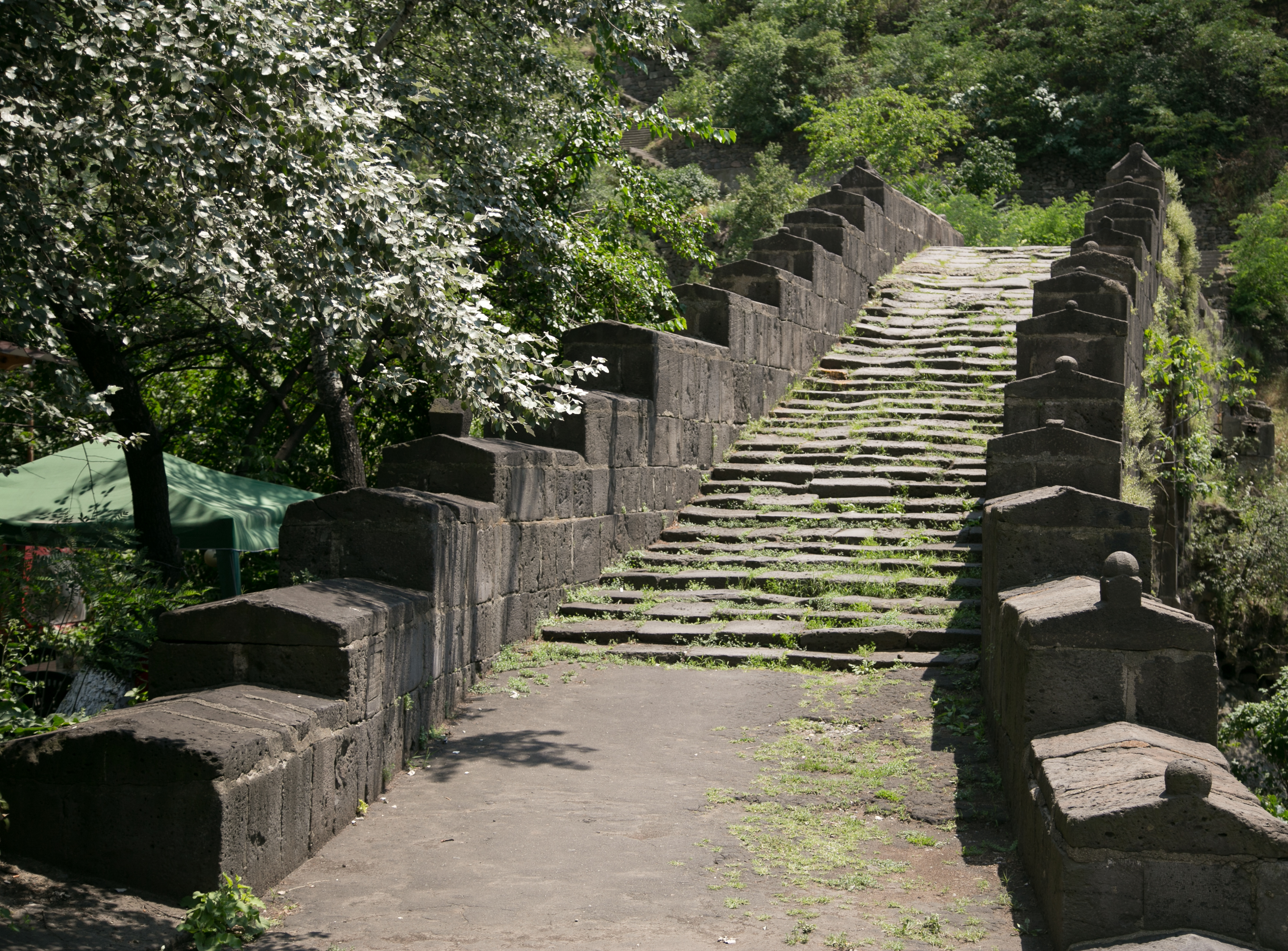
The stepped roadway

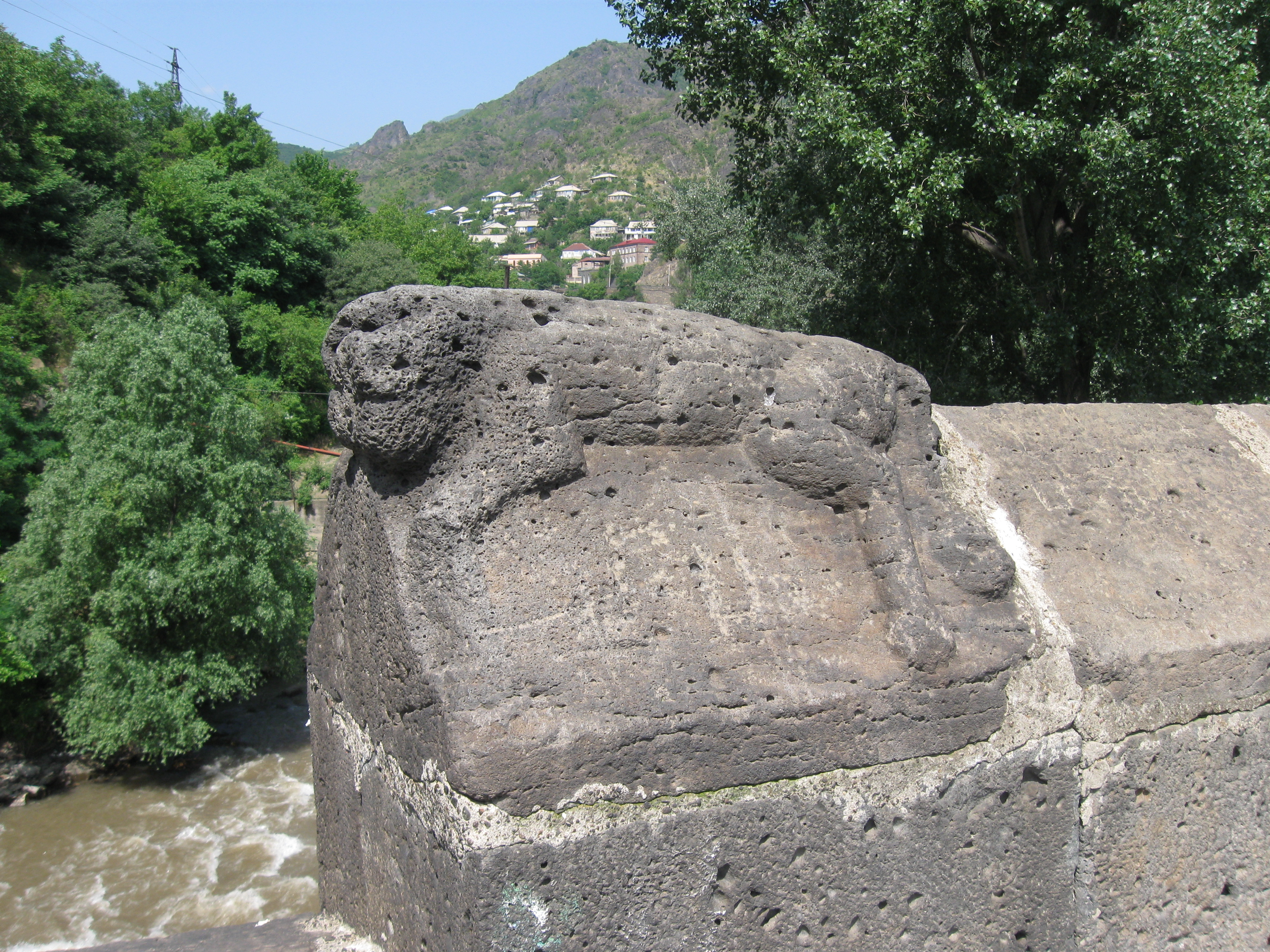
One of the four sculpted lions

It is regarded as Armenia's longest-surviving bridge, which has remained nearly intact since its erection. Karo Ghafadaryan wrote that it is "a unique example of stone bridges that has survived to this day in an almost complete state, with virtually no repairs or alterations" since the late 12th century. Garnik Shakhkyan and Stepan Mnatsakanian wrote that it is "the oldest surviving bridge with such a large arch span".

For decades, it was used by heavy motor vehicles, initially weighing as much as 12 to 14 tons, then 8 tons. For that purpose, it was filled with earth, a practice widely used in Syunik in southern Armenia. By the 1960s, it was turned into a pedestrian-only bridge. (Note: Sources do not specify when the bridge was closed to motor traffic. During restoration in 1955, the roadway fill was cleared, though it is unclear whether this was done partially or entirely, or if the change was temporary or permanent. A 1965 article reported that the passage of all types of vehicles "has recently been prohibited." In 1968, Karo Ghafadaryan noted that the bridge was "no longer in use and is preserved as a historical landmark." By 1978, Konstantine Hovhannisyan wrote that the bridge was "reserved exclusively for pedestrian movement.")

=== Restorations ===
Sanahin Bridge has been restored several times. The first attested restoration dates to 1888, when Father Tadevos Yervandents of the Norashen Church in Tiflis (now Tbilisi, Georgia) funded the reinforcement of the damaged foundations on the left side. He left a seven-line inscription, which was unearthed during restoration works in 1977, when the deposited fill was removed from the descending slope on the northern side, which had been filled with soil to facilitate motor transportation.

In the 1920s, it was among the first monuments restored in Soviet Armenia, alongside the Yereruik basilica. These two constituted the only major restorations in the pre-war period. In 1926, the local authorities appealed to Alexander Tamanian and Ashkharbek Kalantar, directors of the monuments protection committee, to restore the bridge as its foundation had begun to erode. In 1928–29, its left bank foundations were reinforced under the direct supervision of Tamanian, the founder of Armenian neoclassical style. As it was used for motor transport and stood on the sole road connecting the village of Sanahin with Alaverdi, this restoration was "primarily aimed at practical solutions".

Additional restoration work was carried out on its two façades in 1939–40. The finely cut stones had significantly swollen and threatened the integrity of the entire masonry. The arch was not restored. A poorly documented drainage system was further installed by specialists lacking proper experience. The same problem caused by improper drainage later resurfaced and more restoration works were carried out in 1955. Its roadway was exposed to stabilize the bridge and the swollen surfaces of the masonry on the bridge's facades were reconstructed. The bridge was "technically reinforced in a fully reliable manner."

It survived a major flood of the Debed in early 1959 that destroyed the new Sanahin bridge and it thereafter served as the only link between Alaverdi and Sanahin for nearly two years. Further restoration of its façade took place in 1976–77. Additionally, the filling on the roadway was removed, restoring its original stepped form.

=== Current state ===
By 2013, vegetative overgrowth was reported to pose a threat to the bridge's structural integrity. The overgrown vegetation was cleared in December 2021.

The bridge withstood the May 2024 flooding of the Debed River, which damaged seventeen bridges in the area. It was one of the three bridges in Alaverdi that remained intact. Prime Minister Nikol Pashinyan pointed to its arched design as an example of a sturdy and enduring bridge. While initial reports indicated no significant impact from the flood, further inspection after the water receded revealed damage to its foundations. In March 2025, contemporary writer and Alaverdi native Levon Javakhyan warned that the bridge's right-side walls near the foundation had been affected and urged authorities to take action to prevent its collapse.

== Reception ==
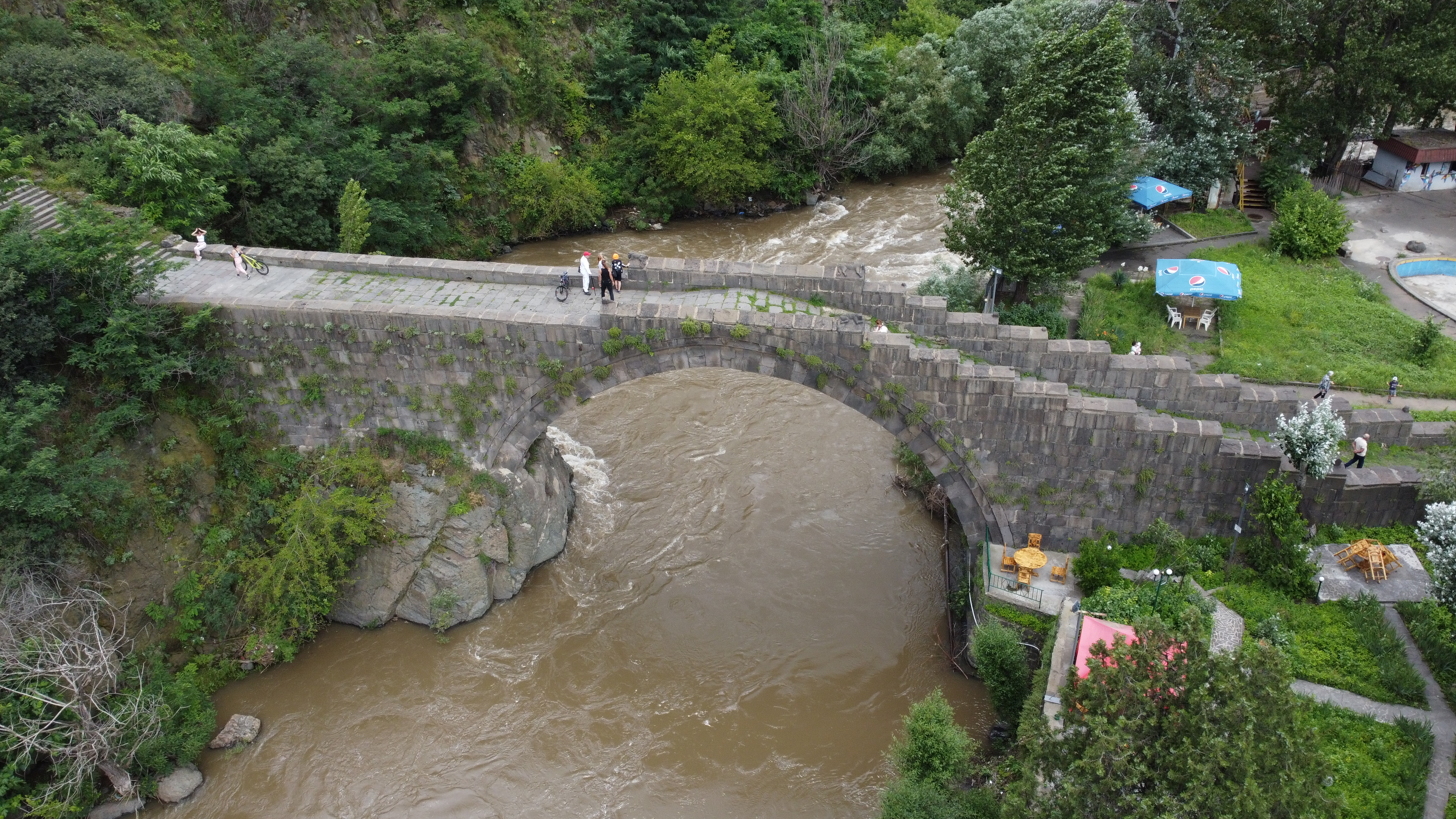
An aerial view from the east

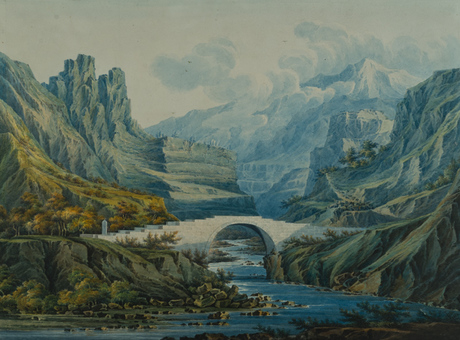
An early 19th century watercolor by Vladimir Moshkov

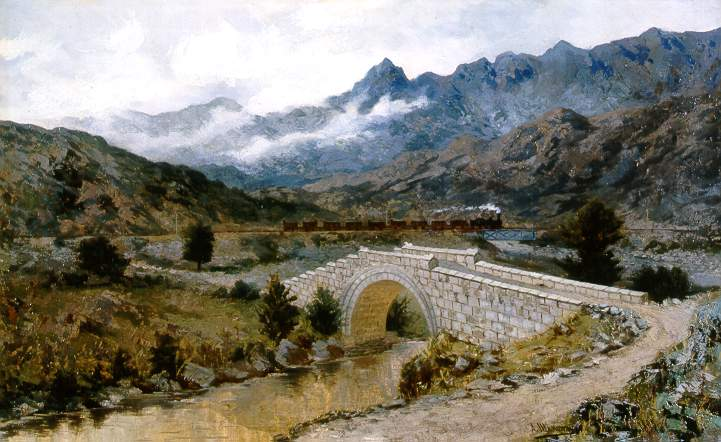
An 1899 oil painting by Harutyun Shamshinyan

Varazdat Harutyunyan and Andranik Baghdasaryan described it as one of the most notable bridges of medieval Armenia. Shakhkyan and Mnatsakanian commended its bold engineering design and refined architectural and artistic sensibility. Stepan Mnatsakanian suggested that it has withstood strong floods and overflows of the turbulent mountain river thanks to its remarkable construction. Valerian Lisovsky and Hovhannes Khalpakhchian found it remarkable, and Grigory Vermishev called it elegant. John Brady Kiesling found it "elegantly decorated with stone cats", while Tokarsky admired its "excellently drawn circular arch adorned with a simple, calm trim."

Russian diplomat Vasiliy Freygang, who visited in 1812, called it a masterpiece. Senior Soviet official Anastas Mikoyan, a native of Sanahin, wrote in his memoirs that the bridge "always delighted [him] with the beauty of its architecture." Another native of Alaverdi, contemporary writer Levon Javakhyan wrote that the bridge resembles "a giant falcon soaring over the Debed river" and called it "the seventh wonder of historical Armenia."

In an 1888 travelogue to Lori, novelist Alexander Shirvanzade wrote that it is "a very simple structure, without complex architectural elements". Boris Piotrovsky wrote in his memoirs that in an "amusing incident" in the 1930s, Soviet civil engineer Grigory Peredery stated in a report at the Soviet Academy of Sciences that the bridge "was not built according to the rules of 'modern technology' and would not have been approved by today's expert commission."

=== In art ===
The bridge has been depicted in a watercolor painting by Vladimir Moshkov (d. 1839), an oil painting (1899) by Harutyun Shamshinyan, a watercolor painting (1934) by Adrian Kapulin, and two wood engravings on paper (1967, 1972) by Ruben Bedrosov.

== See also ==
- List of bridges in Armenia
