= Ruslan Baghdasaryan =

Armenian politician

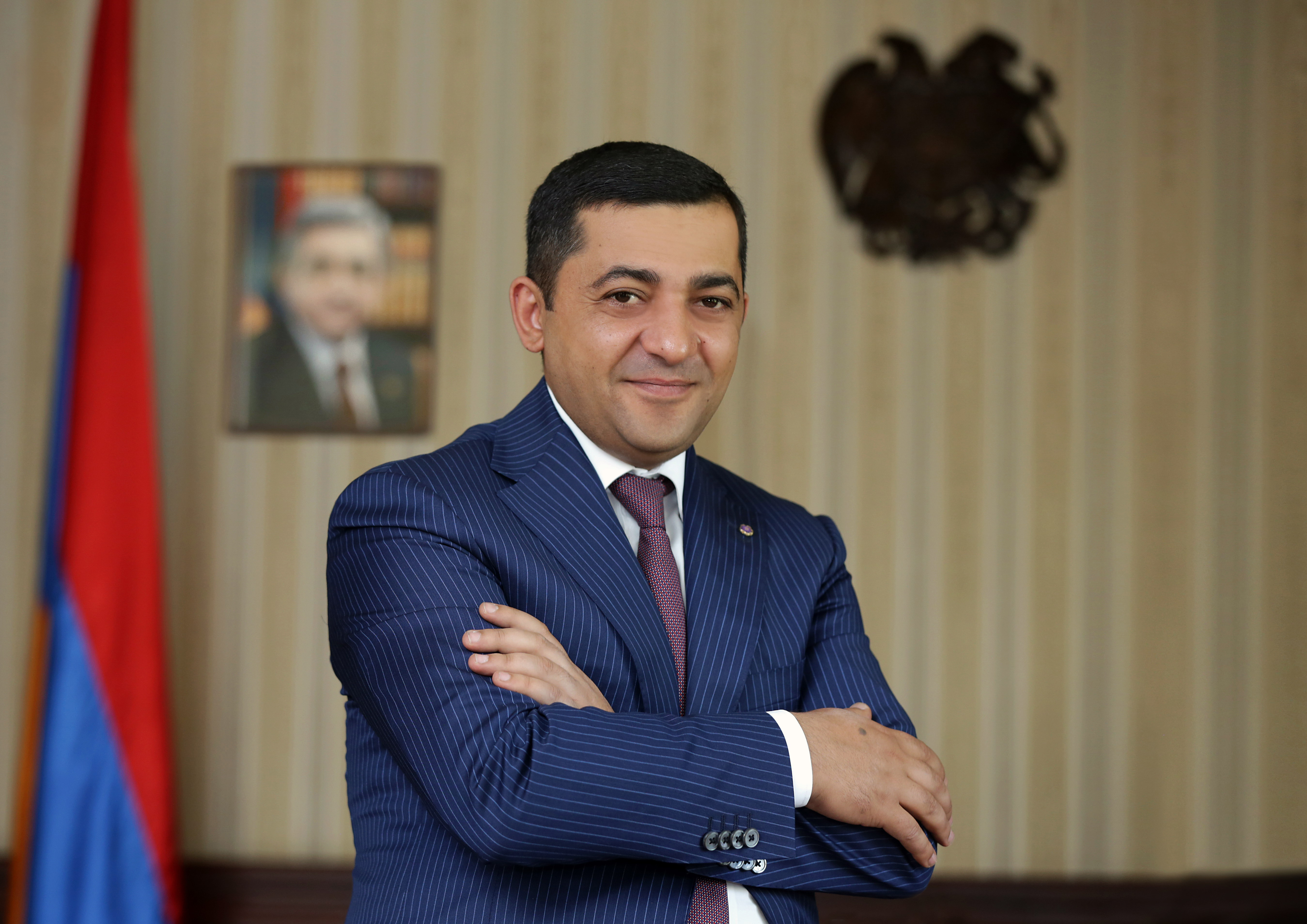
Ruslan Baghdasaryan

Ruslan Shaheni Baghdasaryan (Armenian: Ռուսլան Շահենի Բաղդասարյան, born June 28, 1980, Yerevan) is an Armenian politician. He is the Head of Davtashen District and a member of the Republican Party of Armenia.

== Career ==
On May 22, 2012 he was appointed Head of Davtashen Administrative District.

== Recognition ==
In 2014-2015 he was awarded “The Best Head of an Administrative District” from the National Confidence Council. in Arem.
