= Vladimir Moshkov =

Russian war artist (1792–1839)

- Born: 16 July 1792; Moscow, Russian Empire
- Died: 1839 (aged 46–47); Astrakhan, Russian Empire
- Education: Imperial Academy of Arts
- Known for: War artist
- Awards: Gold Medal of the Imperial Academy of Arts

Vladimir Ivanovich Moshkov (Russian: Владимир Иванович Мошков; 16 July 1792 – 1839) was a Russian artist, specifically a war artist, who is best known for his painting of the Battle of Leipzig during the Napoleonic Wars.

== Biography ==
Vladimir Moshkov was born in 1792 in Moscow, Russia. He graduated from the Academy of Arts at the age of nine, followed by Imperial Academy of Arts in Saint Petersburg at the age of eleven, under the guidance of Mikhail Matveevich Ivanov.

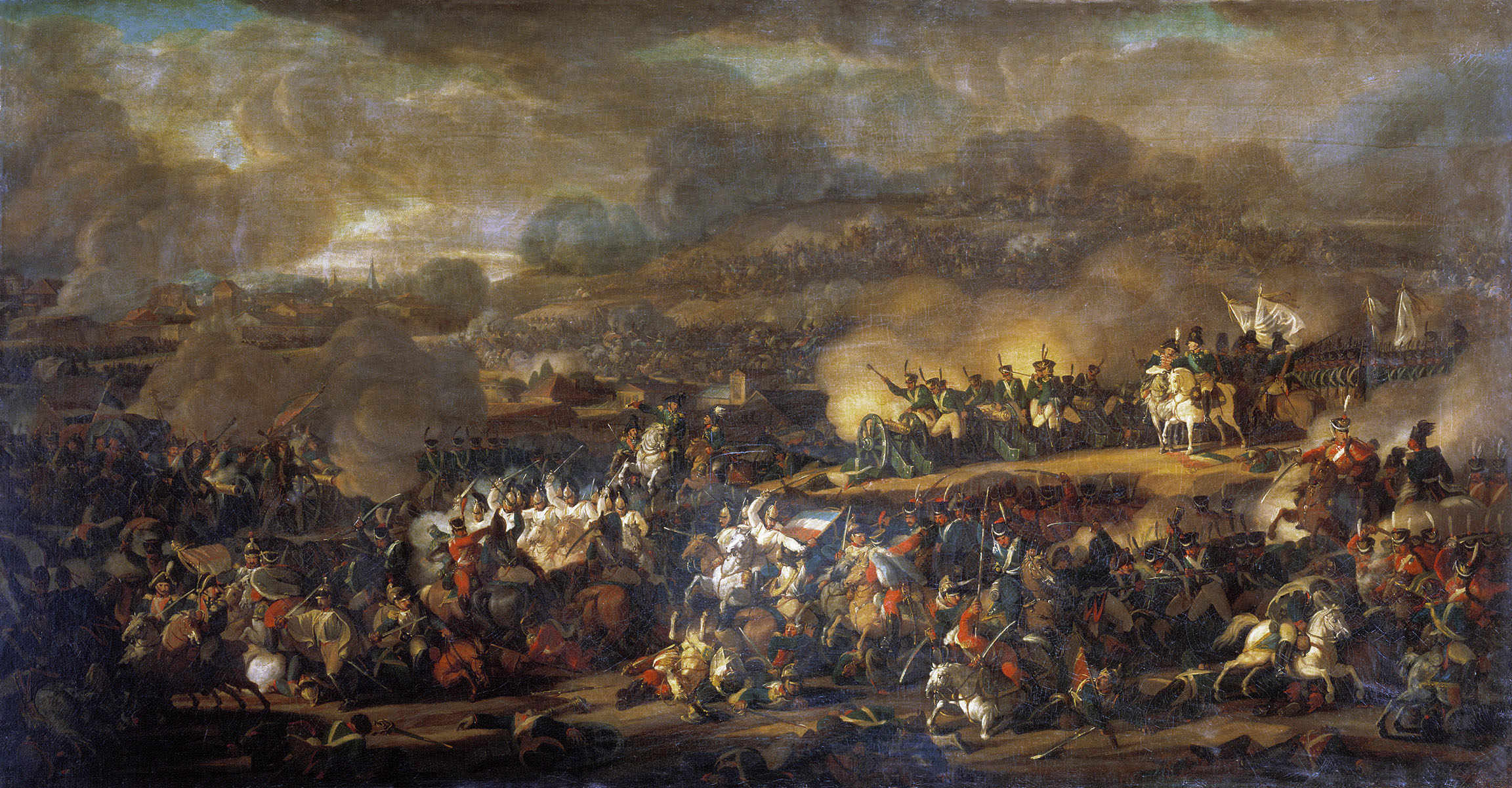
Vladimir Moshkov's Battle of Leipzig

During the Battle of Leipzig, Moshkov had positioned himself in Wachowski heights to gain a strong vantage point on the battlefield. After the war, Moshkov travelled through Persia between 1816 and 1818, and Anatolia between 1828 and 1829. He would pass away in 1839 under the age of 47.

== Works ==
One of Moshkov's most famous works is the Battle of Leipzig painting: A wide painting depicting the historical clash of the Russian and Prussian armies. In response to the work's creation, the Imperial Academy of Arts awarded Moshkov with the title of Academian. Other works by Moshkov include the painting The Battle of the Romans and Latin People, which earned him a gold medal and first-degree diploma to the title of class artist.

Moshkov also drew during his diplomatic missions in Persia, depicting important events such as the Meeting of Paskevich with Abbas Mirza and the Treaty of Turkmenchay, as well as paintings depicting battles such as The Storming of the Sardarabad fortress and the Victory over the Persians at Javan-Bulaga.

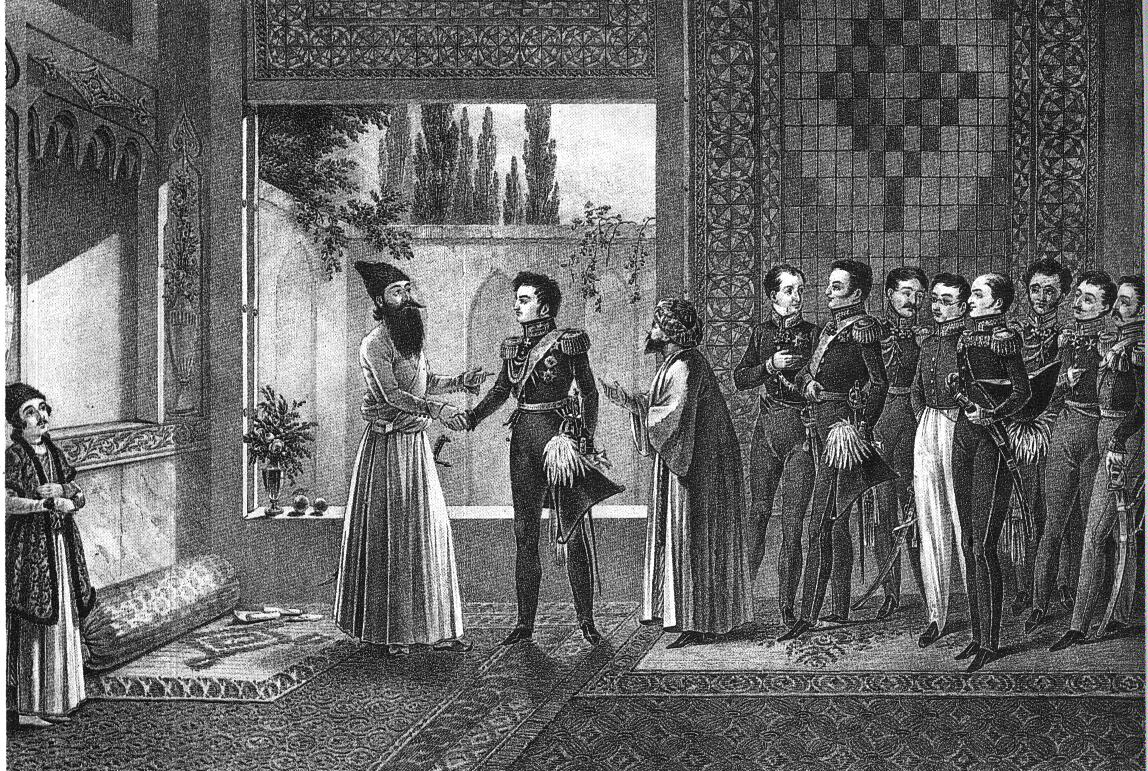
Moshkov's Meeting of Paskevich with Abbas Mirza, made during the end of the Russo-Persian War

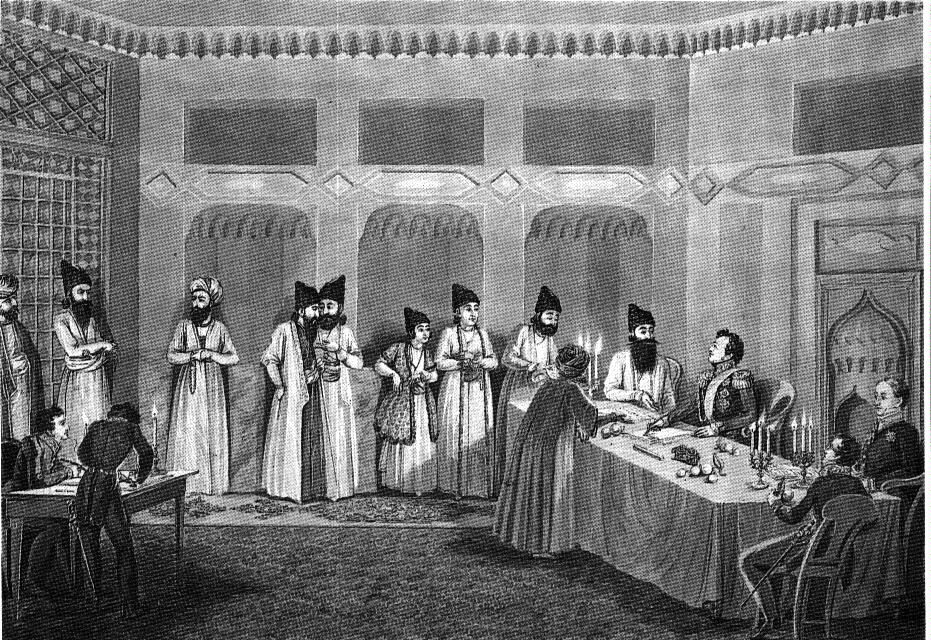
Moshkov's Treaty of Turkmenchay

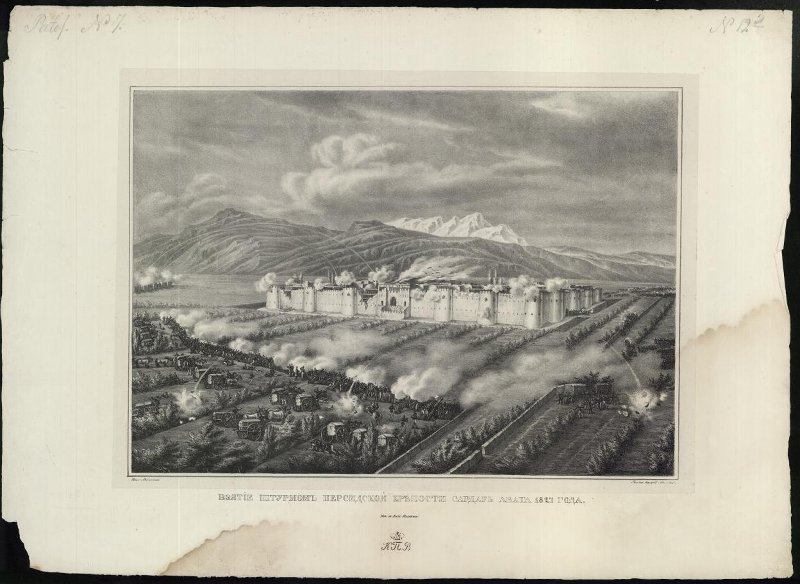
Moshkov's depiction of the storming of the Sardarabad Fortress

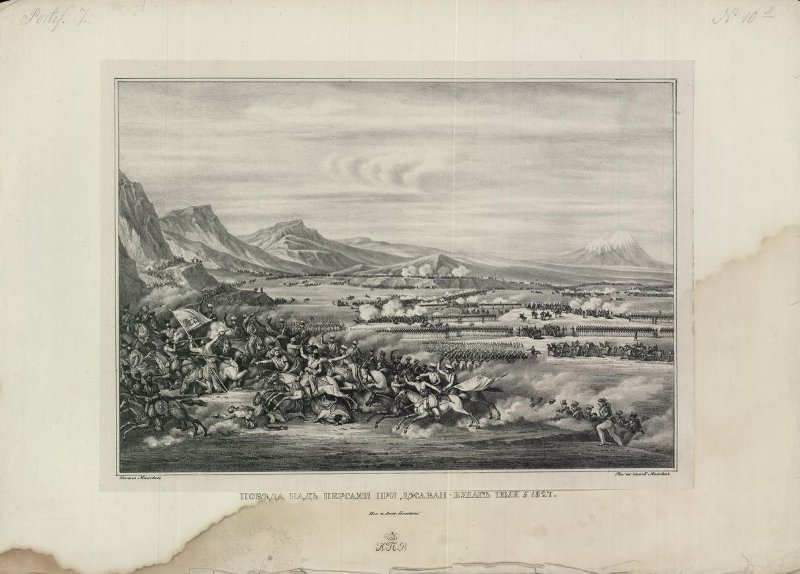
Moshkov's depiction of the Javan-Bulaga battle on 5 July 1827
