= Davtashen Bridge =

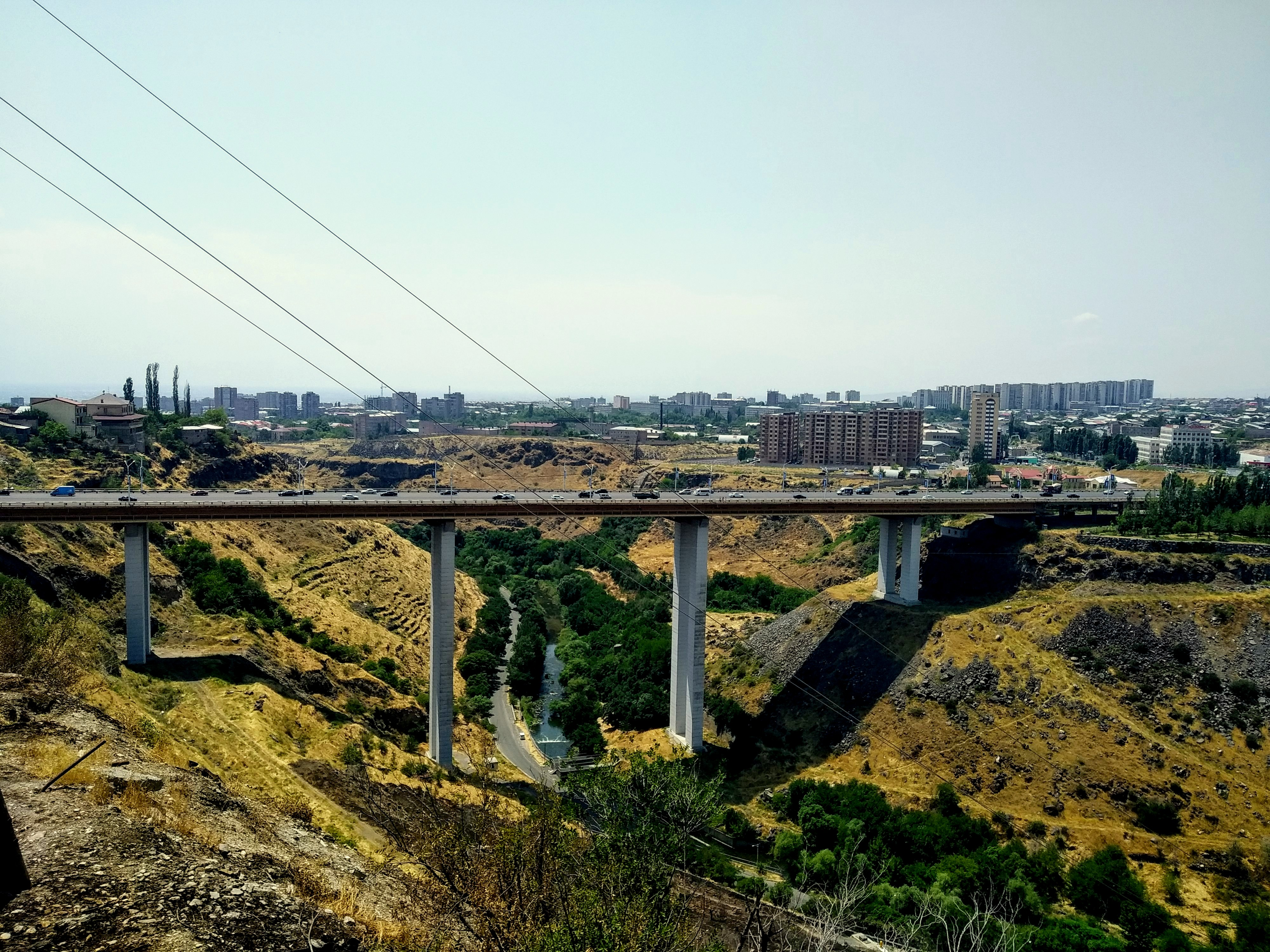
- Davtashen Bridge
- Coordinates: 40°12′36″N 44°29′34″E
- Crosses: Hrazdan River
- Locale: Yerevan

Characteristics
- Total length: 496 m (1,627.3 ft)
- Width: 32 m (105.0 ft)
- Height: 92 m (301.8 ft)

History
- Opened: 2000

Statistics
- Daily traffic: Dual carriageway

Location
- Interactive map of Davtashen Bridge

Davtashen Bridge or Davitashen Bridge (Armenian: Դավթաշենի կամուրջ) is a bridge for traffic linking across the Hrazdan River in Yerevan, Armenia. It connects the Vagharshyan street of Arabkir district with the Sasna Tsrer street of Davtashen district within the capital city. The construction process was launched during the 1970s by the Soviet government but abandoned shortly after. Only in 2000, the construction of the bridge was completed. Height above the water level of the river Hrazdan -92m. The bridge was constructed by Kamurjshin company.

The bridge was designed by architect Romeo Julhakyan.
