= Davtashen District =

District in Yerevan, Armenia

Davtashen Դավթաշեն
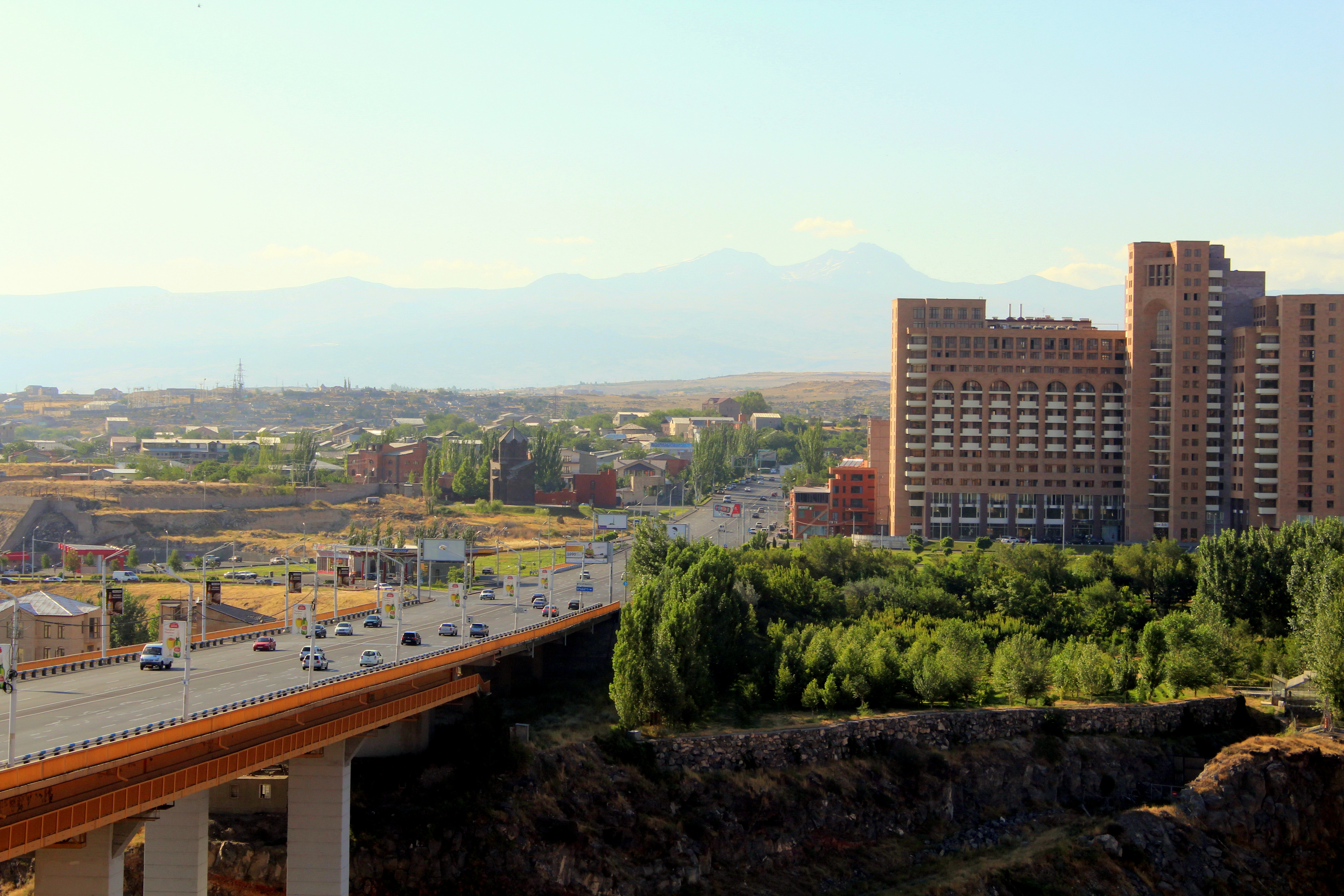
- Davtashen with Mount Aragats in the background

- Davtashen district shown in red

- Location in Armenia
- Coordinates: 40°12′57″N 44°28′52″E
- Country: Armenia
- Marz (Province): Yerevan

Government
  - Mayor of district: Mikayel Tumasyan

Area
  - Total: 6.47 km^{2} (2.50 sq mi)
- Elevation: 1,120 m (3,670 ft)

Population (2022 census)
  - Total: 43,704
  - Density: 6,750/km^{2} (17,500/sq mi)
- Time zone: UTC+4 (AMT)
- Website: davtashen.am

Davtashen (Armenian: Դավթաշեն վարչական շրջան, romanized: Davtashen varch’akan shrjan), also known as Davitashen or Davidashen, is one of the 12 districts of Yerevan, the capital of Armenia.

Located on the right bank of Hrazdan River, Davtashen is bordered by the districts of Ajapnyak and Arabkir from the south, and the Kotayk Province from the north.

== Overview ==
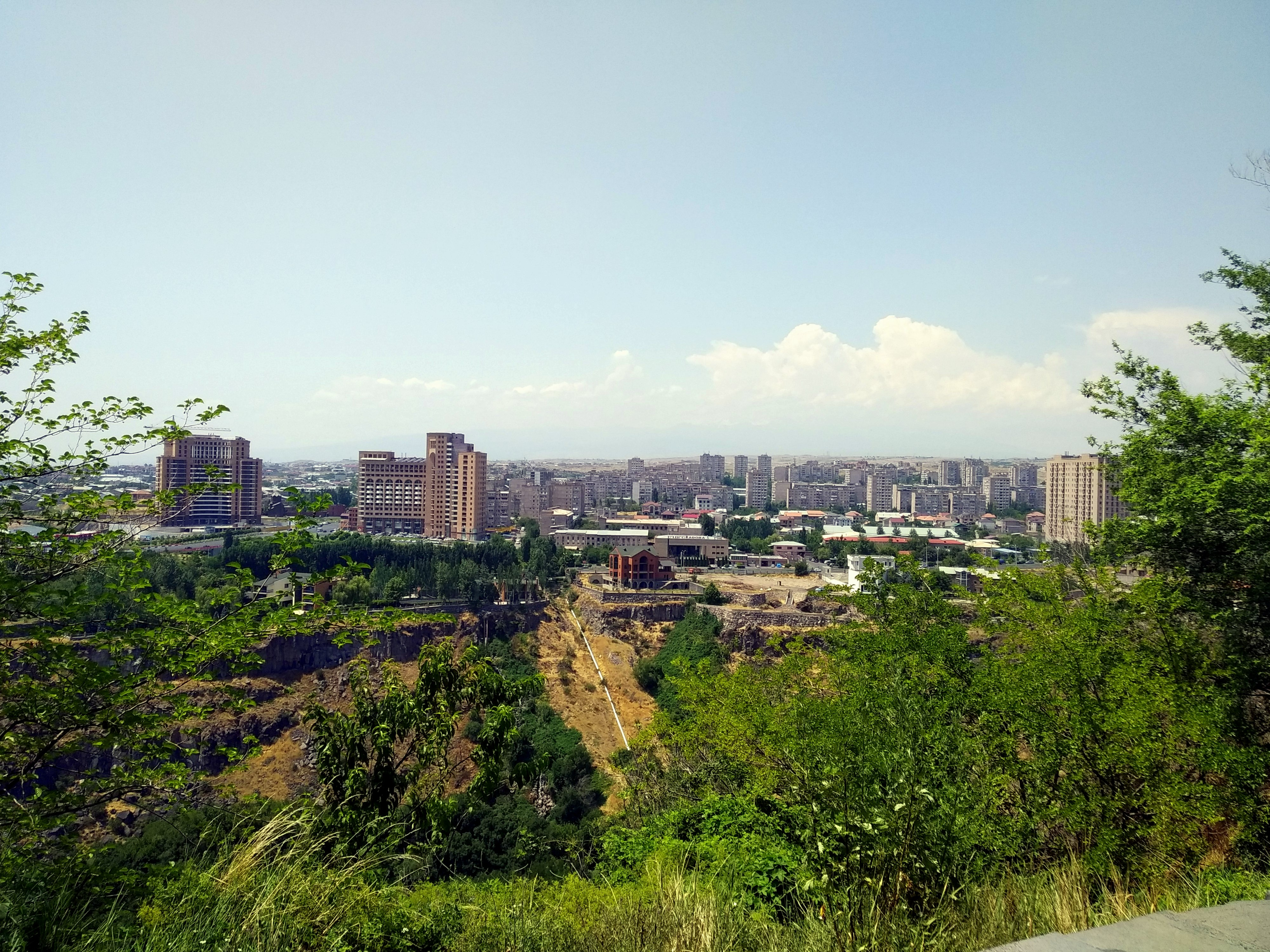
View of Davtashen

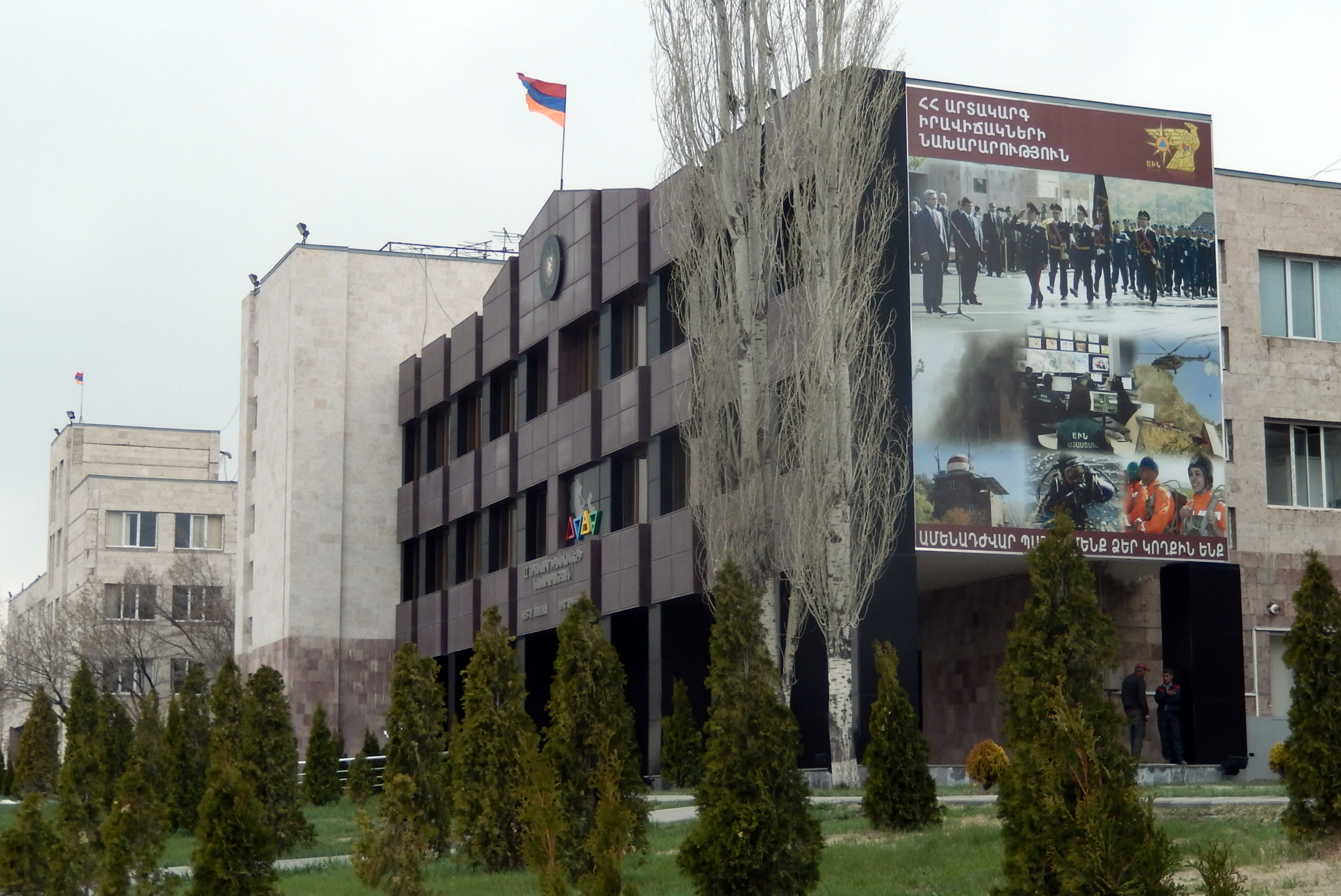
Ministry of Emergency Situations of Armenia

With an area of 6.47 km^{2}, (2, 9% of the Yerevan city area), Davtashen is the second smallest district of Yerevan in terms of area. It is unofficially divided into smaller neighborhoods such as the 4 blocks of Davtashen, Northern Davtashen and Huysi Avan. The main streets of the district are Sasna Tsrer Street, Tigran Petrosian Street, Pirumians Street, Aghababyan Street and Anastas Mikoyan Street. The district administration is located on Pirumians Street. A large rectangular public park on Pirumians Street separates the 1st residential block from the 2nd residential block of Davtashen.

The district has been twice announced as the best among the 12 districts of Yerevan with the result of assessing and analyzing the performance of public services which have been carried out by the administrative districts of Yerevan during 2012 and 2013.

Davtashen is home to the Directory of Passport and Visa of the Police of Armenia, as well as the Ministry of Emergency Situations.

== History ==
The area of modern-day Davtashen was known as Arajin gyugh ('First Village') until the 1930s, during the Soviet period. It was included within the newly formed Shahumyan raion at the northwest of Yerevan, on the right bank of Hrazdan River. In 1939, the settlement known as Arajin gyugh was renamed Davtashen on the occasion of the 1000th anniversary of the Daredevils of Sassoun national epic poem, where David of Sassoun is the main hero.

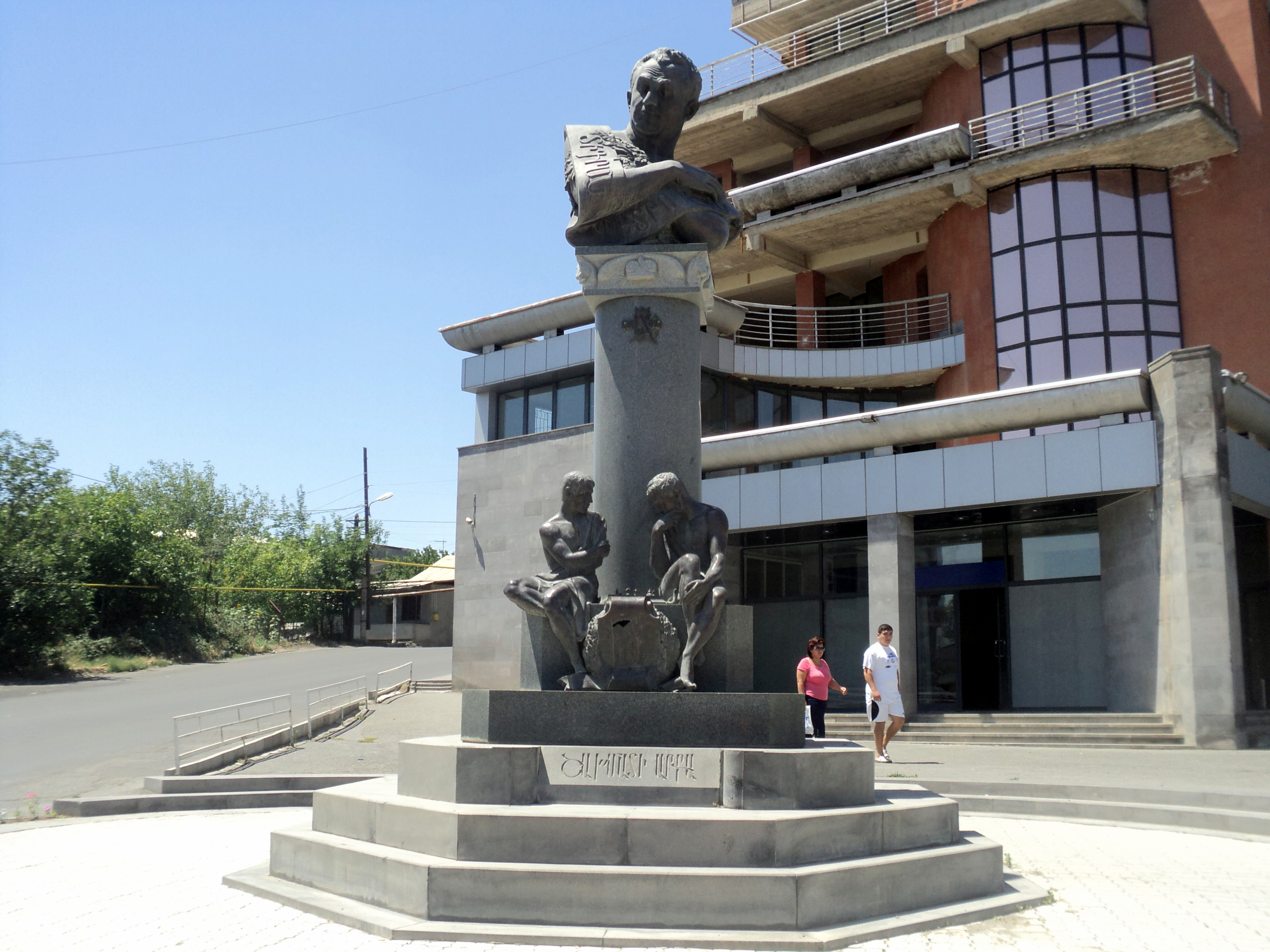
The statue of the Soviet-Armenian World Chess Champion Tigran Petrosian in Davtashen, erected in 2006 on the street bearing his name

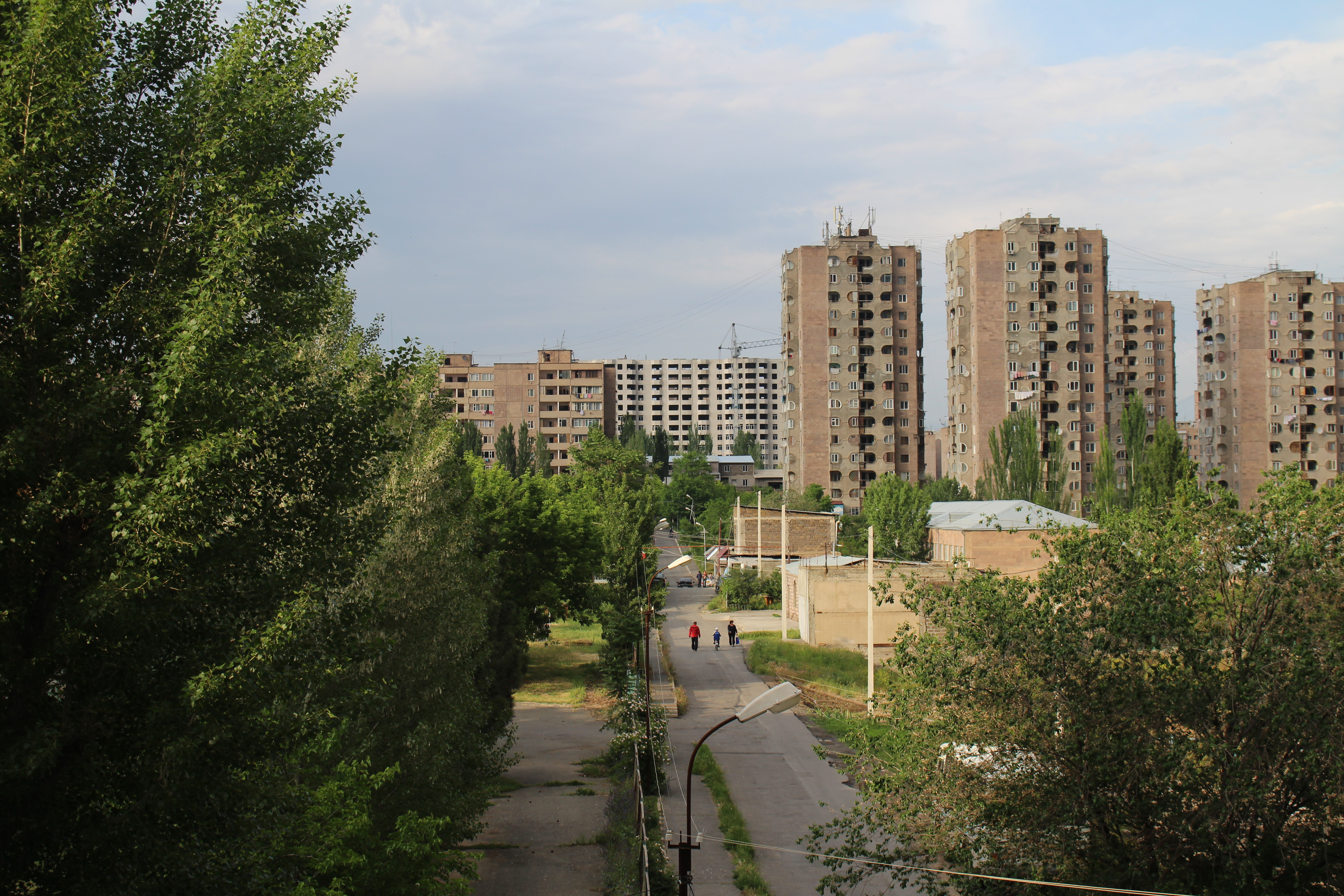
Soviet-era residential buildings

With the gradual development of Soviet Yerevan, the area of the city was enlarged to include the nearby suburbs and the surrounding territories. Several bridges were built over the Hrazdan River, linking the Shahumyan raion with the central parts of Yerevan. During the 1970s, the village of Davtashen became officially part of the capital Yerevan.

In 1984, the Soviet Executive Committee of Yerevan allocated 223 hectares of area for the construction of the residential neighbourhoods of Davtashen.

As per the 1986 administrative divisions of Soviet Yerevan, present-day Ajapnyak and Davtashen districts were part of the Mashtots raion.

With the independence of Armenia, and following the new law about the administrative divisions of the republic adopted in 1996, Yerevan was divided into 12 administrative districts, including Davtashen.

The first mayor of Davtashen was Ruben Gevorgyan who served between 1996 and 1999. He was followed by Surik Ghukasyan (1999-2008), and Artur Gevorgyan (2008-2012). Ruslan Baghdasaryan of the Republican Party of Armenia is the current mayor, serving since 2012.

== Demographics ==
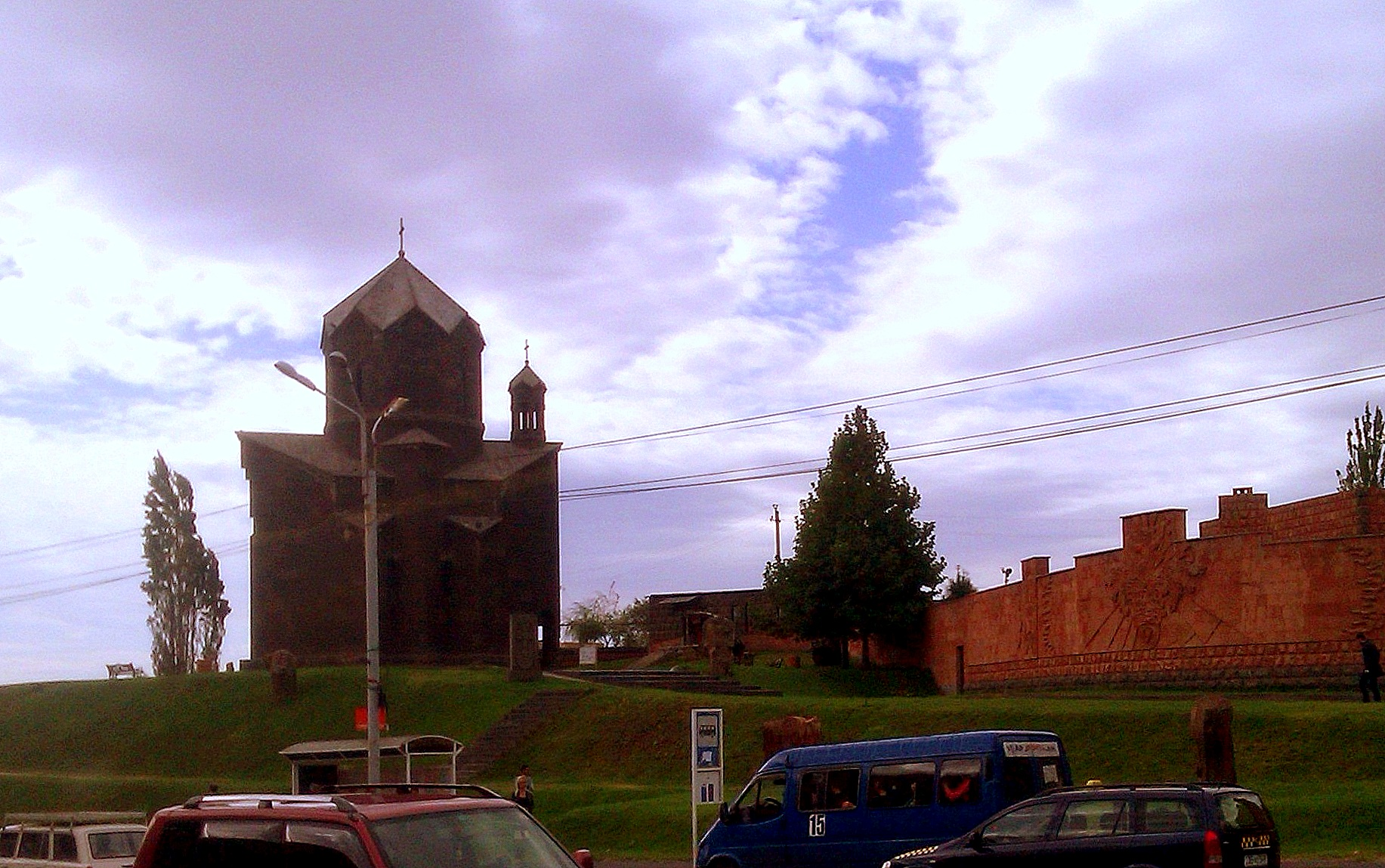
Holy Martyrs Church

As of the 2022 census, the district had a population of 43,704, which is 4.02% of Yerevan city population and ranked 10th among the Yerevan districts. Davtashen is mainly populated by Armenians who belong to the Armenian Apostolic Church. The Holy Martyrs Church consecrated in 2003, is currently the only church in the district.

== Culture ==
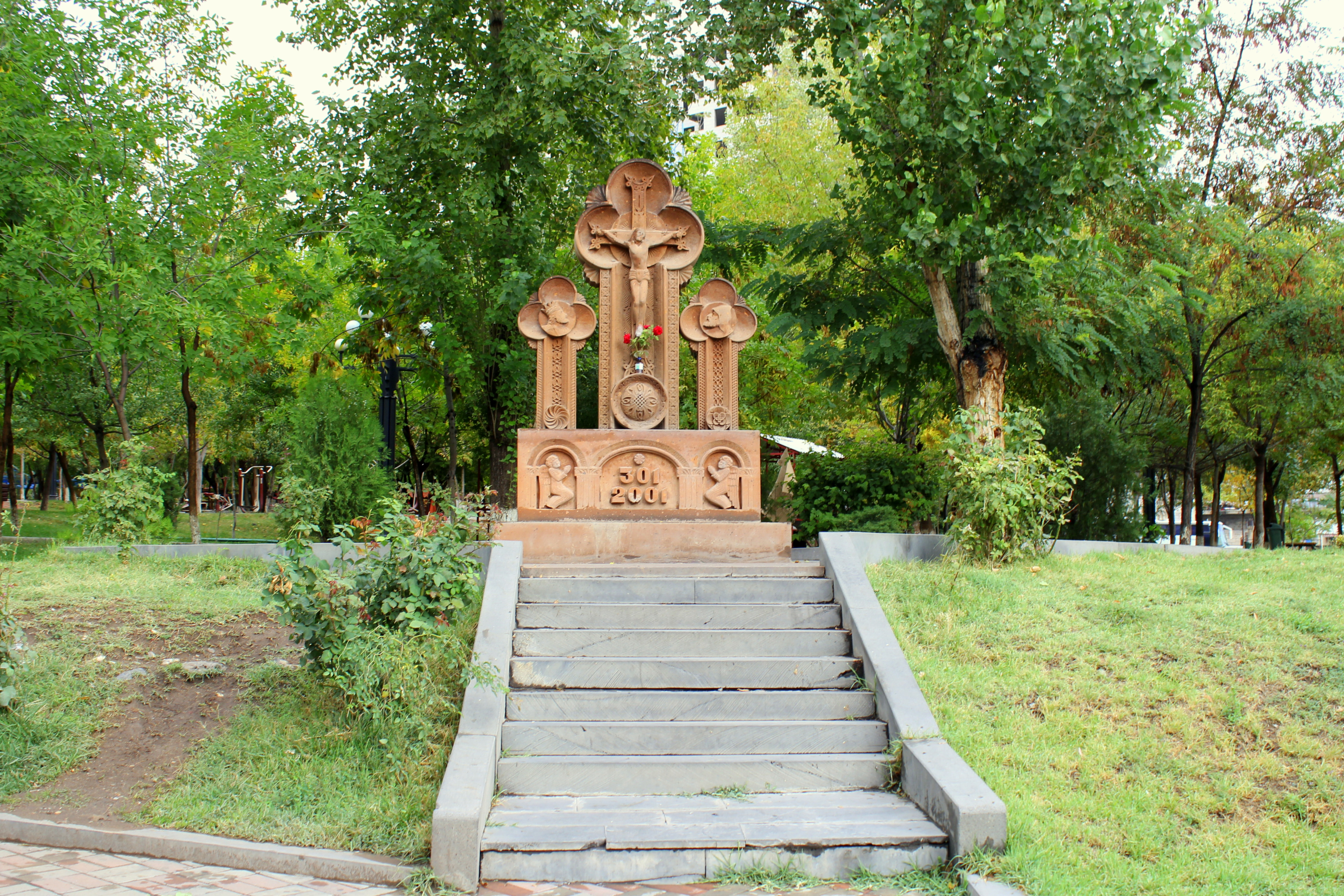
Khachkar dedicated to the 1700th anniversary of Christianity in Armenia

Davtashen is home to Library No. 40, opened in 1996, and the school of art named after Avet Terterian, opened in 1993.

The Armenfilm studios as well as the Armenia TV station of the PanArmenian Media Group are located in Davtashen.

Davtashen Public Park is home to a memorial dedicated to the Armenian victims of World War II and the First Nagorno-Karabakh War. A large khachkar was erected in the park in 2001, on the occasion of the 1700th anniversary of the conversion Armenia to Christianity.

== Transportation ==
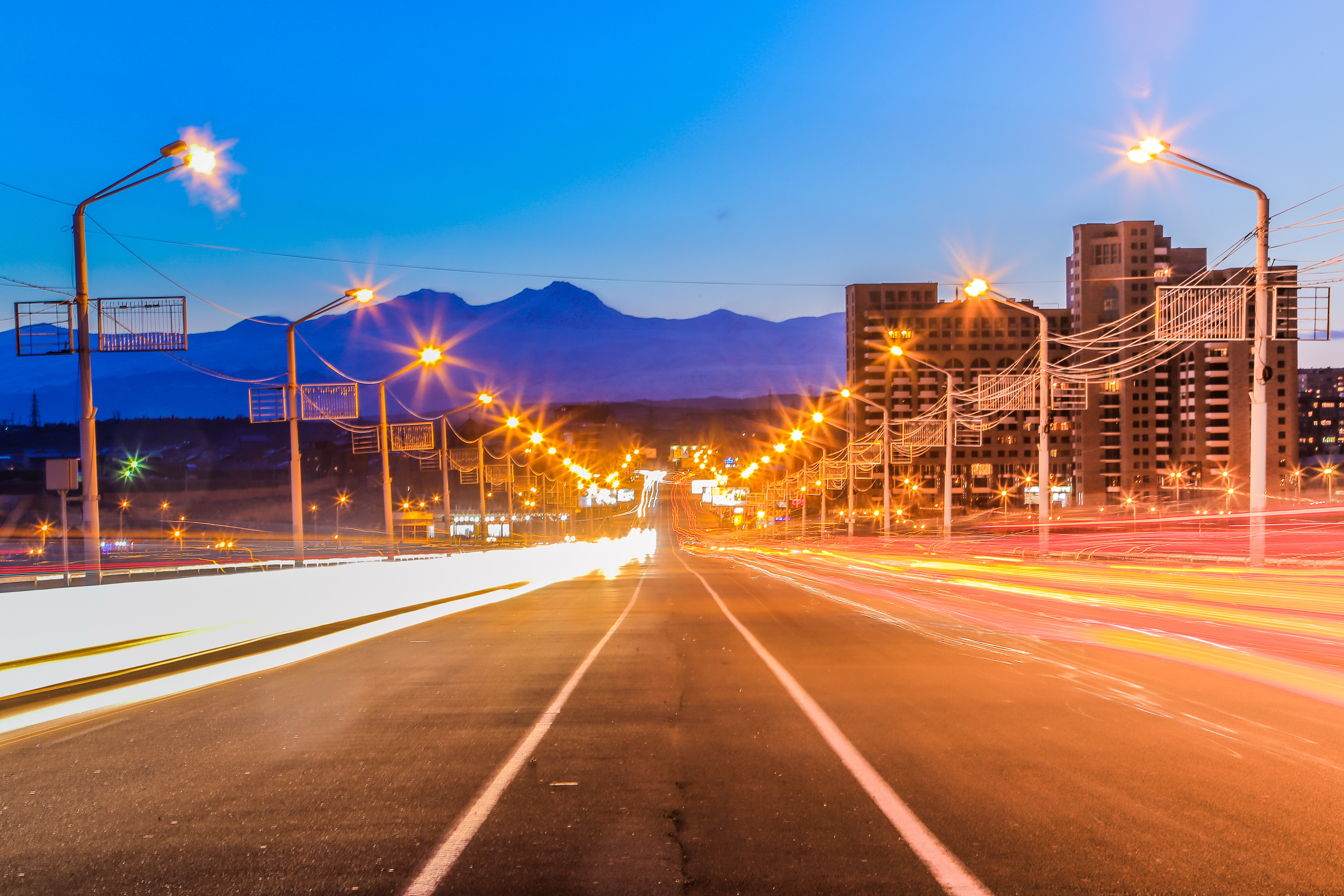
Davtashen Bridge

Davtashen is connected with the central parts of Yerevan by the Davtashen Bridge, opened in 2000. In 2019, Mayor of Yerevan Hayk Marutyan announced that preliminary work had begun to extend the Yerevan Metro to Davtashen.

== Economy ==
The people of Davtashen are mainly involved in small and mid-sized business. It is home to around 300 small and medium-sized retail shops, eateries and other businesses.

Arax factory for metal structures is a large industrial plant, operating in Davtashen since 1984.

== Education ==
As of 2017, Davtashen is home to 5 preschool kindergartens, 7 public schools, as well as the Academy of Justice of the Ministry of Justice of Armenia, which opened in 2014.

== Sport ==
Davtashan is home to many sport centres, including:

- Yerevan children and youth handball and team-sports specialized school, opened in 1993.
- Davtashen Chess School, opened in 2013.
- "Swimmer closer to water" children and youth swimming school.
- Olympavan Olympic Training Complex, opened in 2015.
- Reebok Sports Club Armenia, opened in 2017.

== International relations ==
The administration of Davtashen District has an official cooperation agreement with:

- Antony, Hauts-de-Seine, Île-de-France, France, since 2015.
- Artik, Shirak Province, Armenia.
- Martakert, Republic of Artsakh.

== Panoramic view ==
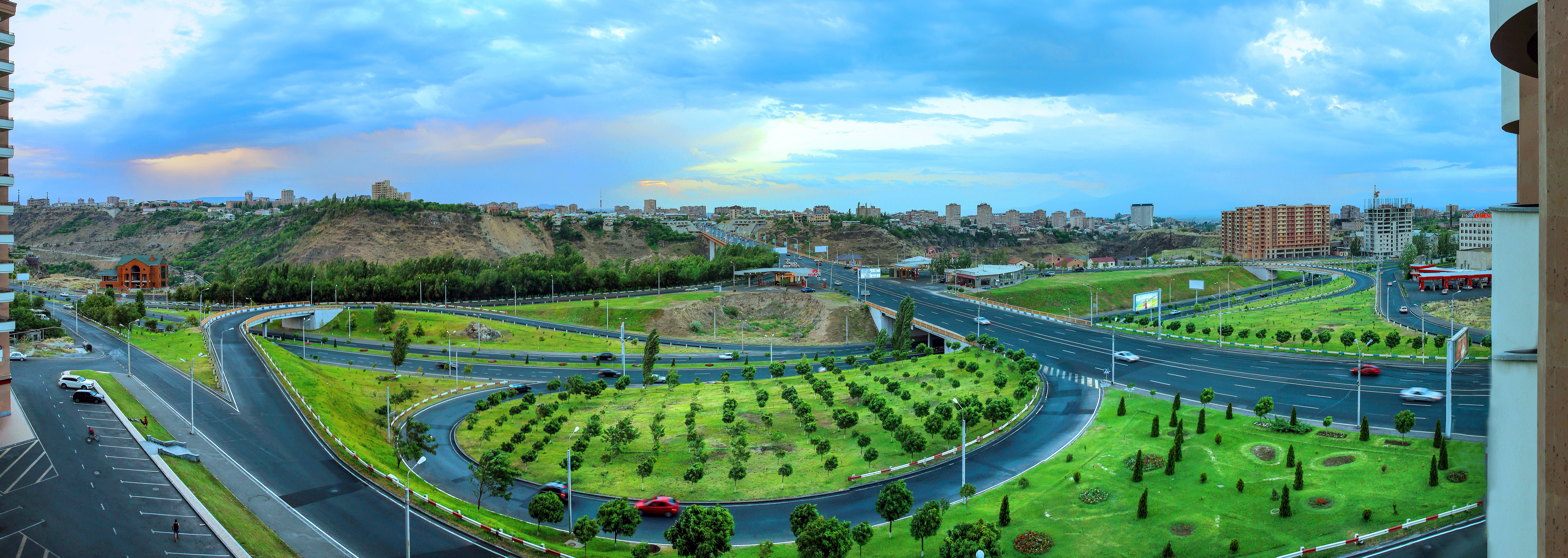
Panoramic view of Davtashen district
