= 2024 Armenia–Georgia floods =

Natural disaster in Armenia and Georgia

- Duration: 26 May 2024
- Location: Armenia, Georgia
- Cause: Heavy rainfall, flash floods
- Deaths: 4

On 26 May 2024, heavy rains caused floods in Armenia and Georgia, with the Debed, Aghstev, and Tashir rivers bursting their banks. Three people have been confirmed dead, with 269 people evacuated from the area. Several bridges in the region collapsed. Several transportation links have been closed, including trains between Yerevan and Tbilisi as well as the main border crossing between Armenia and Georgia.

Water supply to several villages in the Tavush and Lori provinces was disrupted as a result of the flooding. Many homes and stores were washed away by the floods. Armenian Prime Minister Nikol Pashinyan visited Lori and Tavush provinces to assess damages and to help coordinate aid and recovery efforts.
