= Red Bridge, Yerevan =

Red Bridge
- Coordinates: 40°10′18″N 44°30′00″E
- Crosses: Hrazdan River
- Locale: Yerevan, Armenia

Characteristics
- Material: Red tuff
- Total length: 80 m
- Height: 11 m

History
- Constructed by: Khoja-plav (reconstructed)
- Construction end: 1679 reconstructed in 1830 restored in 2025

Location
- Interactive map of Red Bridge

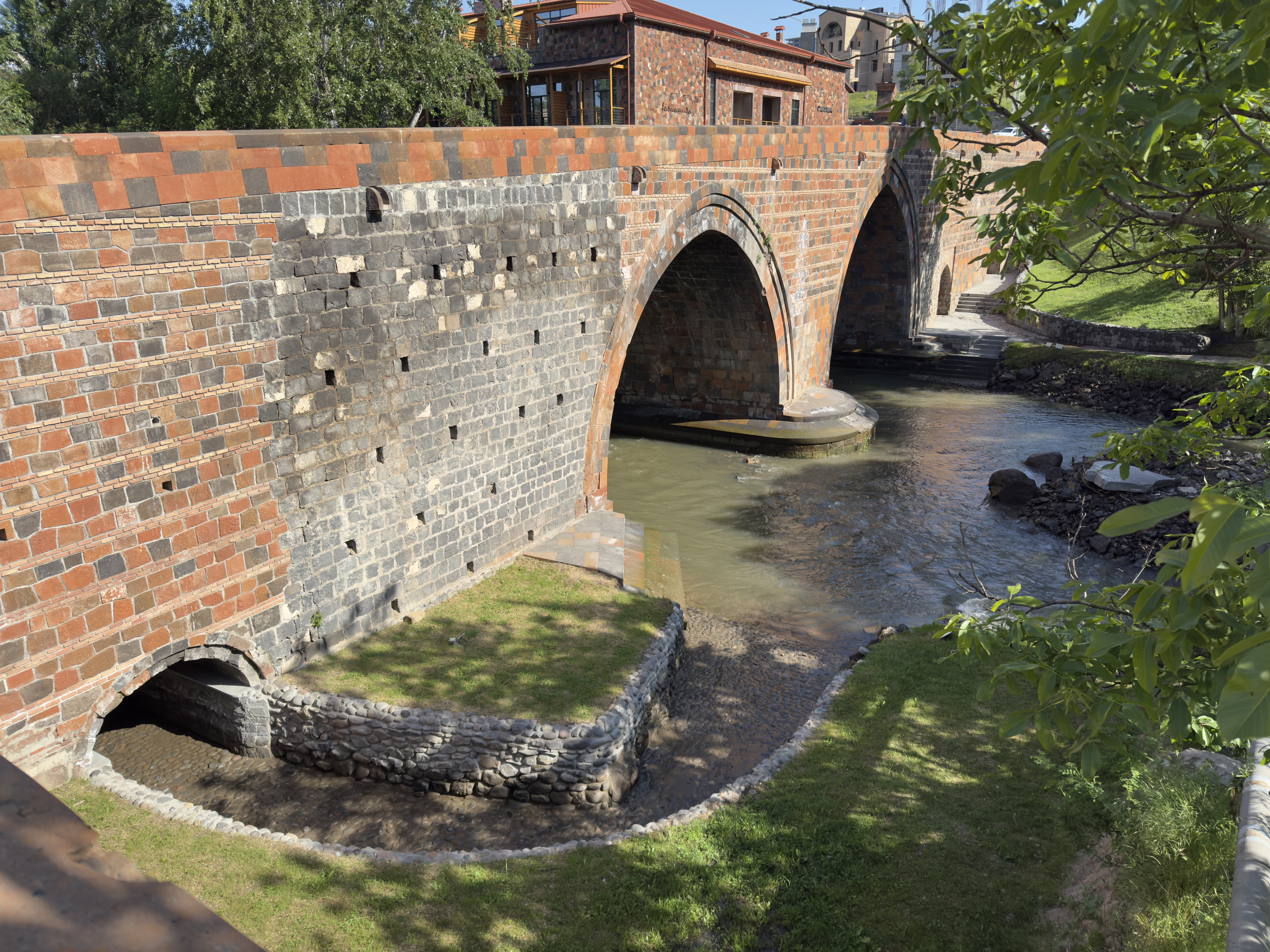
Red (Karmir) Bridge

The Red Bridge (Armenian: Կարմիր կամուրջ, Karmir kamurj; also known as the Old Bridge of Hrazdan; and also known as Bridge of Khoja Plav, Խոջա Փլավի կամուրջ, Khoja Plavi kamurj) is a 17th-century bridge built of red tuff on the Hrazdan River in Yerevan, Armenia. An earlier bridge in the same place was ruined by the 1679 Armenia earthquake.

The bridge was also called "Khoja-plav bridge" for Khoja-plav, a wealthy man from Kanaker who financed its reconstructruction.

The total length of the bridge is 80 meters and its height is 11 meters. It has 4 arches. Two are in the middle and squiggly, the other two arches are on the banks of the Hrazdan River.

The bridge was restored in 2025 as part of a public-private partnership.

== Gallery ==
Historic pictures of the bridge

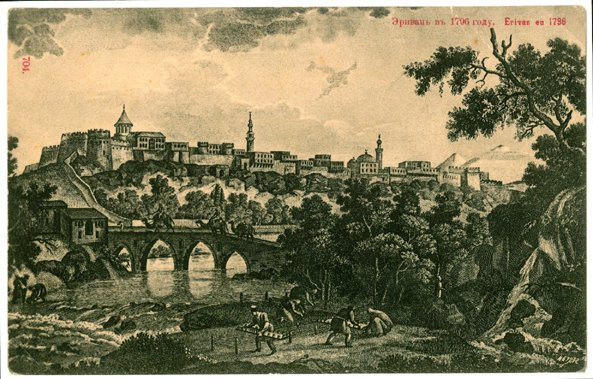

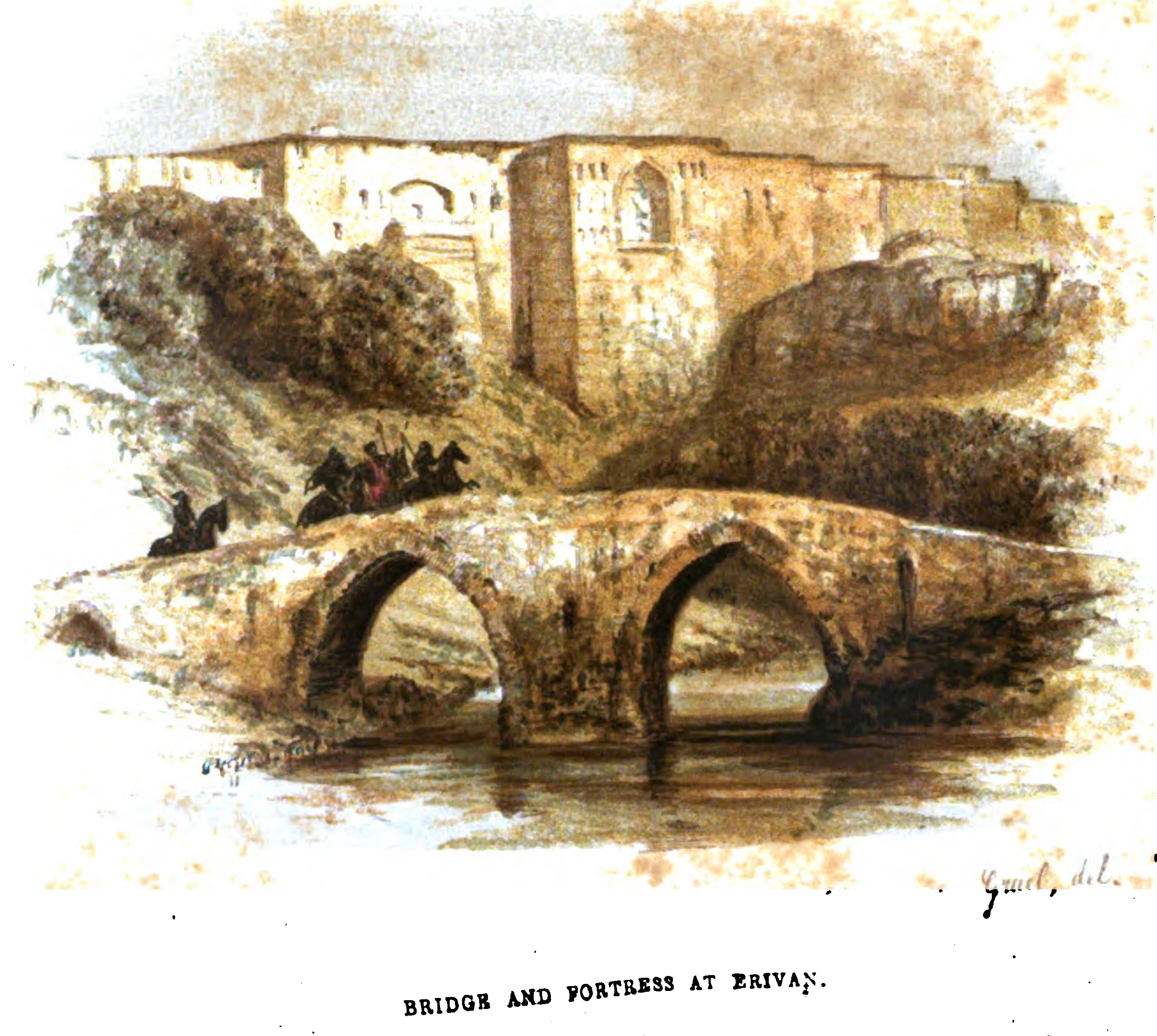

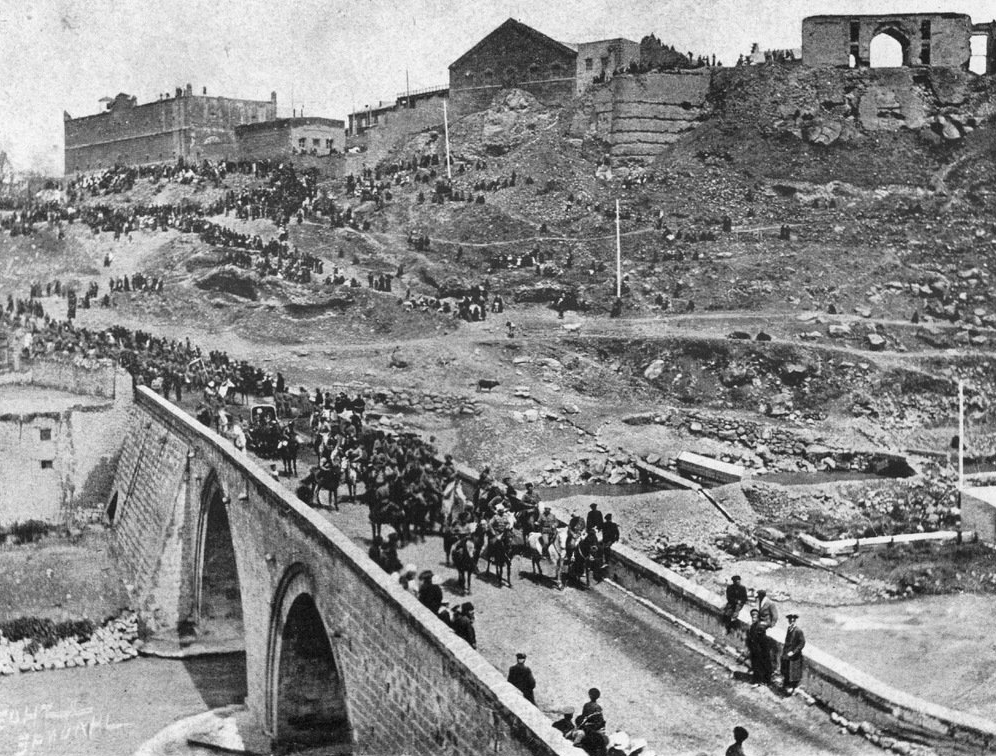

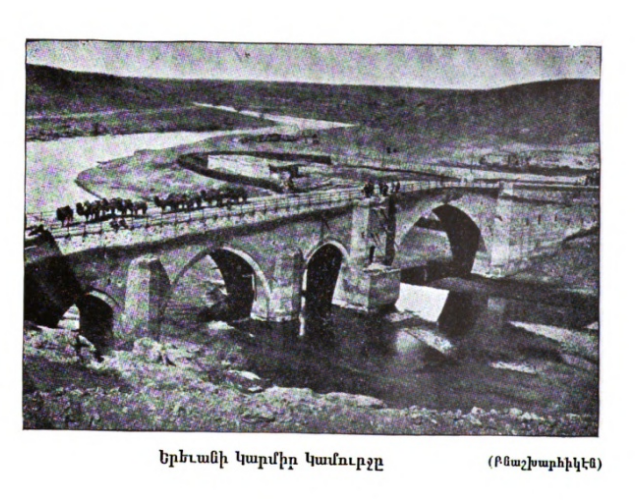

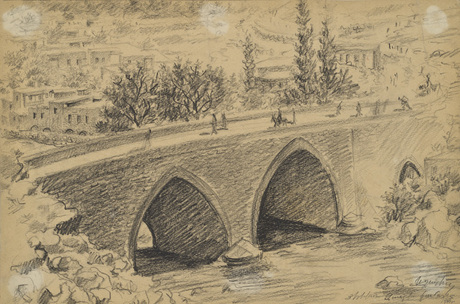

The bridge in the 21st century

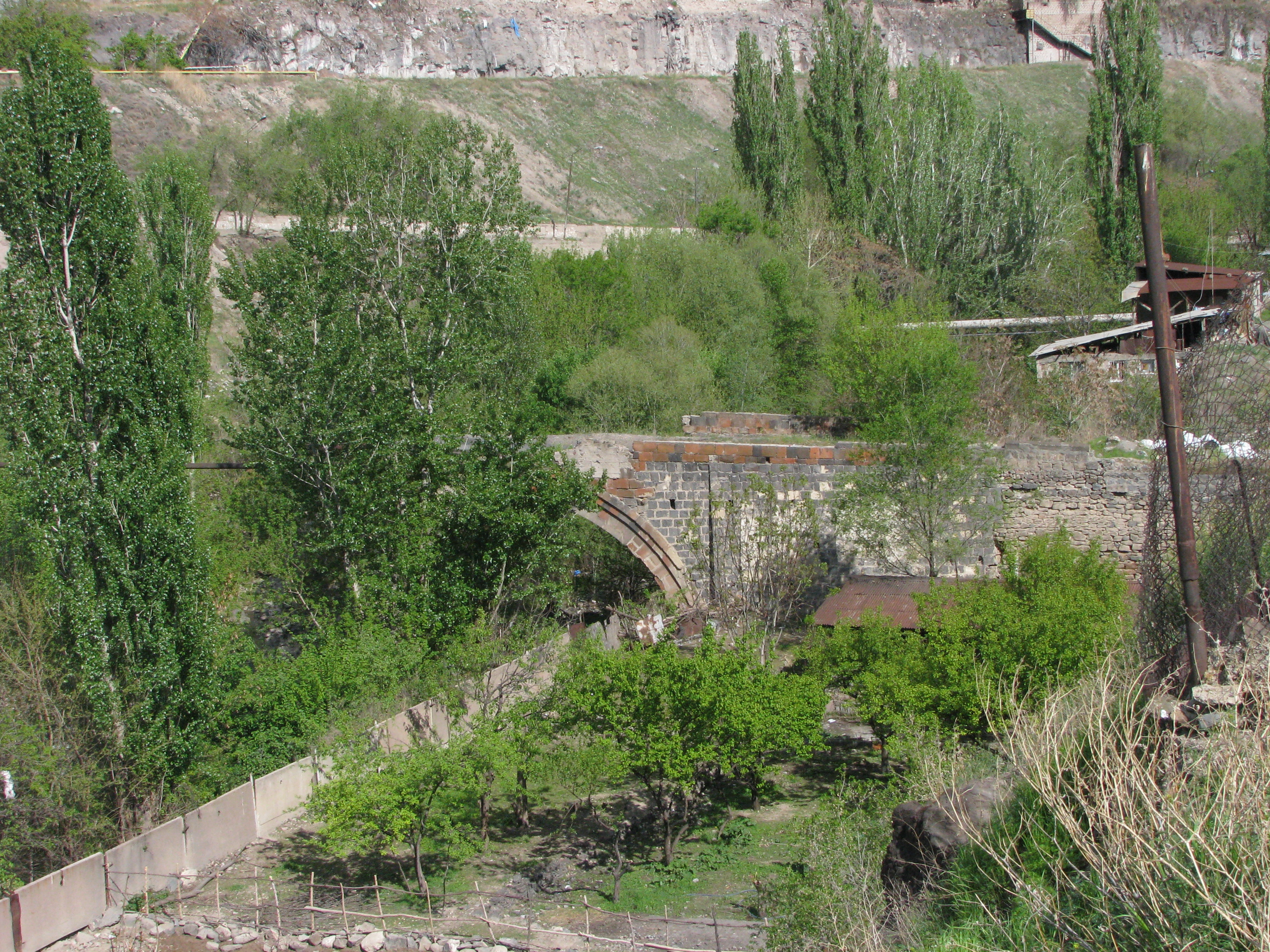
Ruins of the bridge before reconstruction

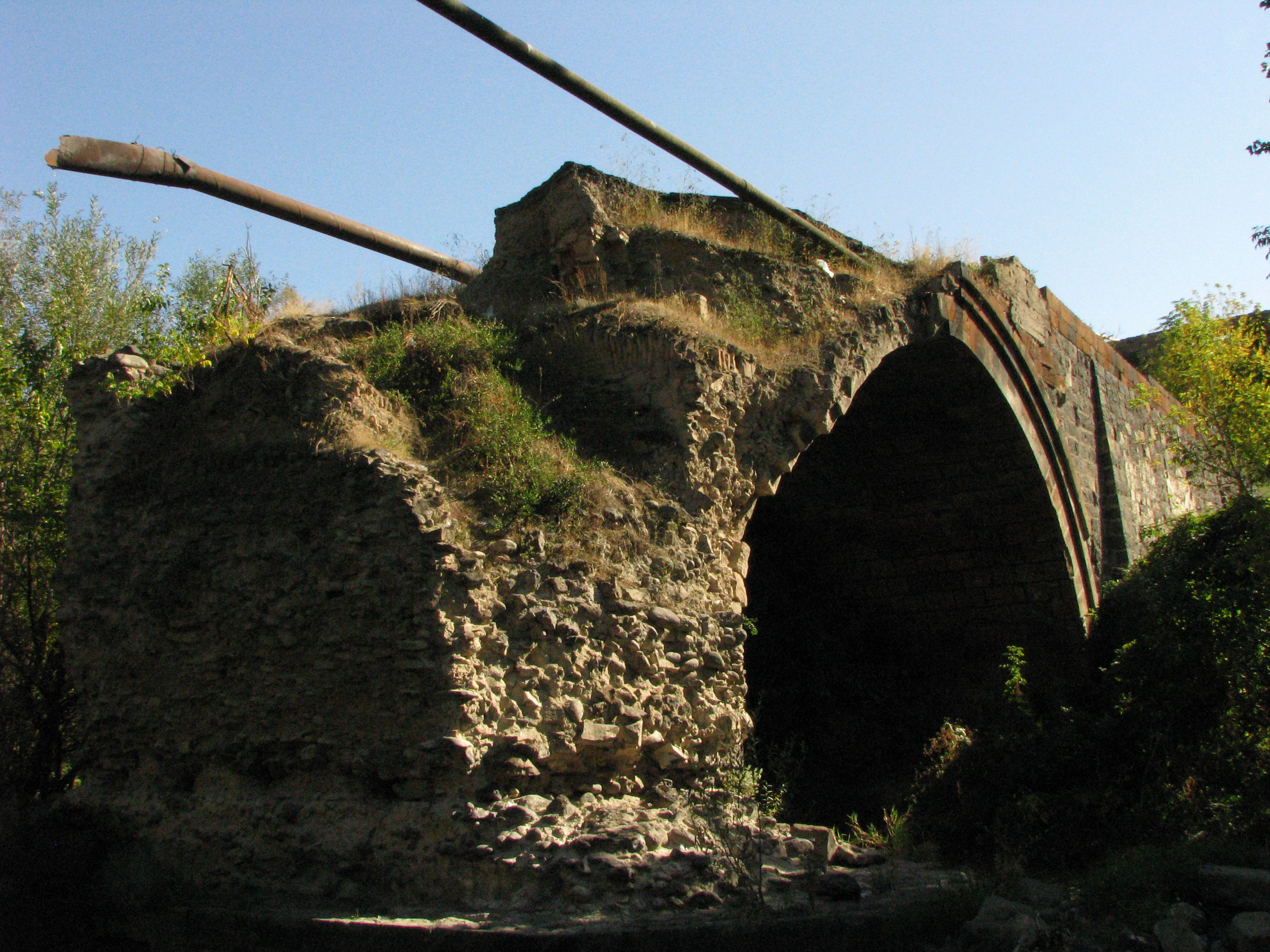
Ruins of the bridge before reconstruction

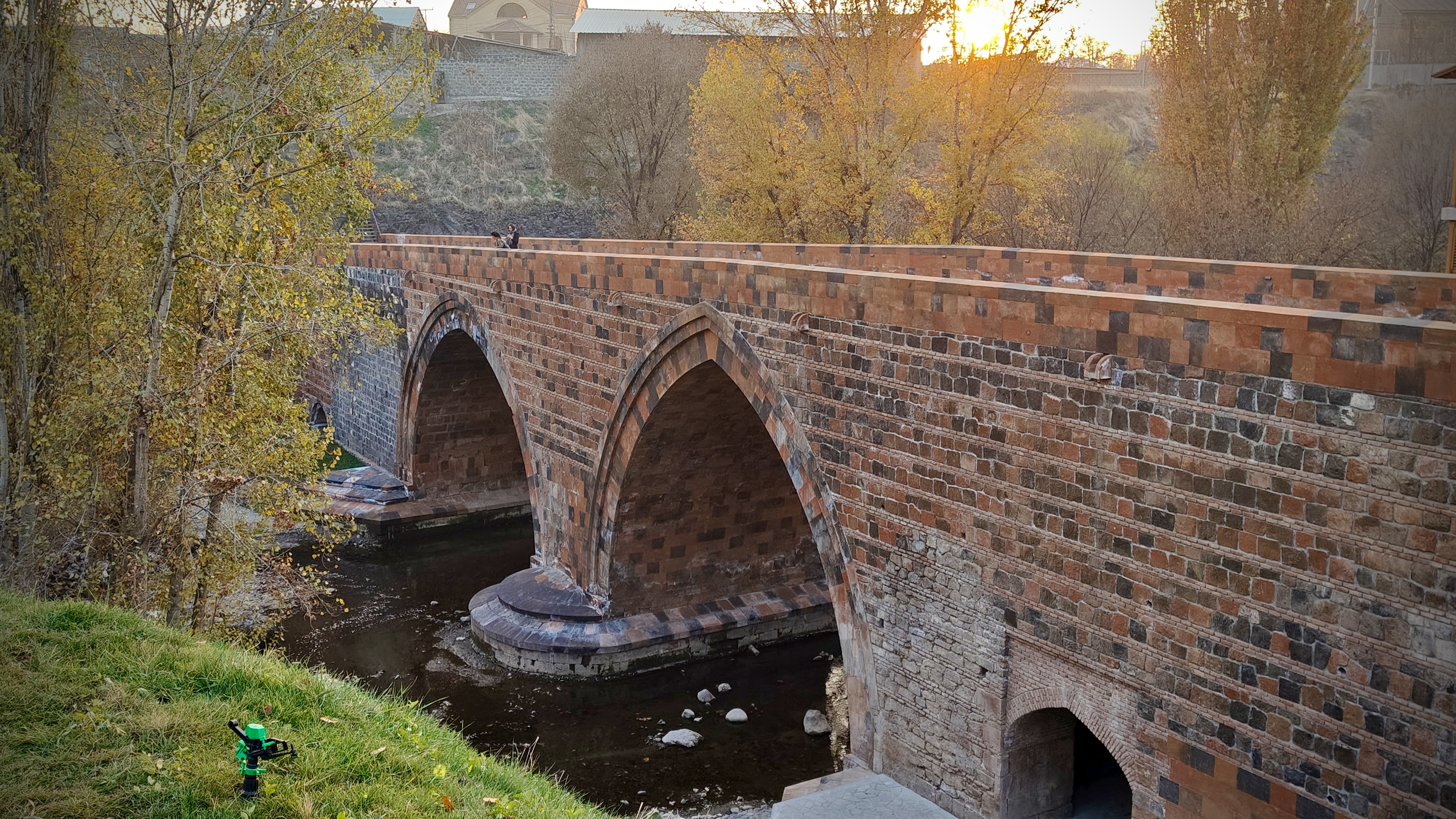
The bridge in 2025 after reconstruction

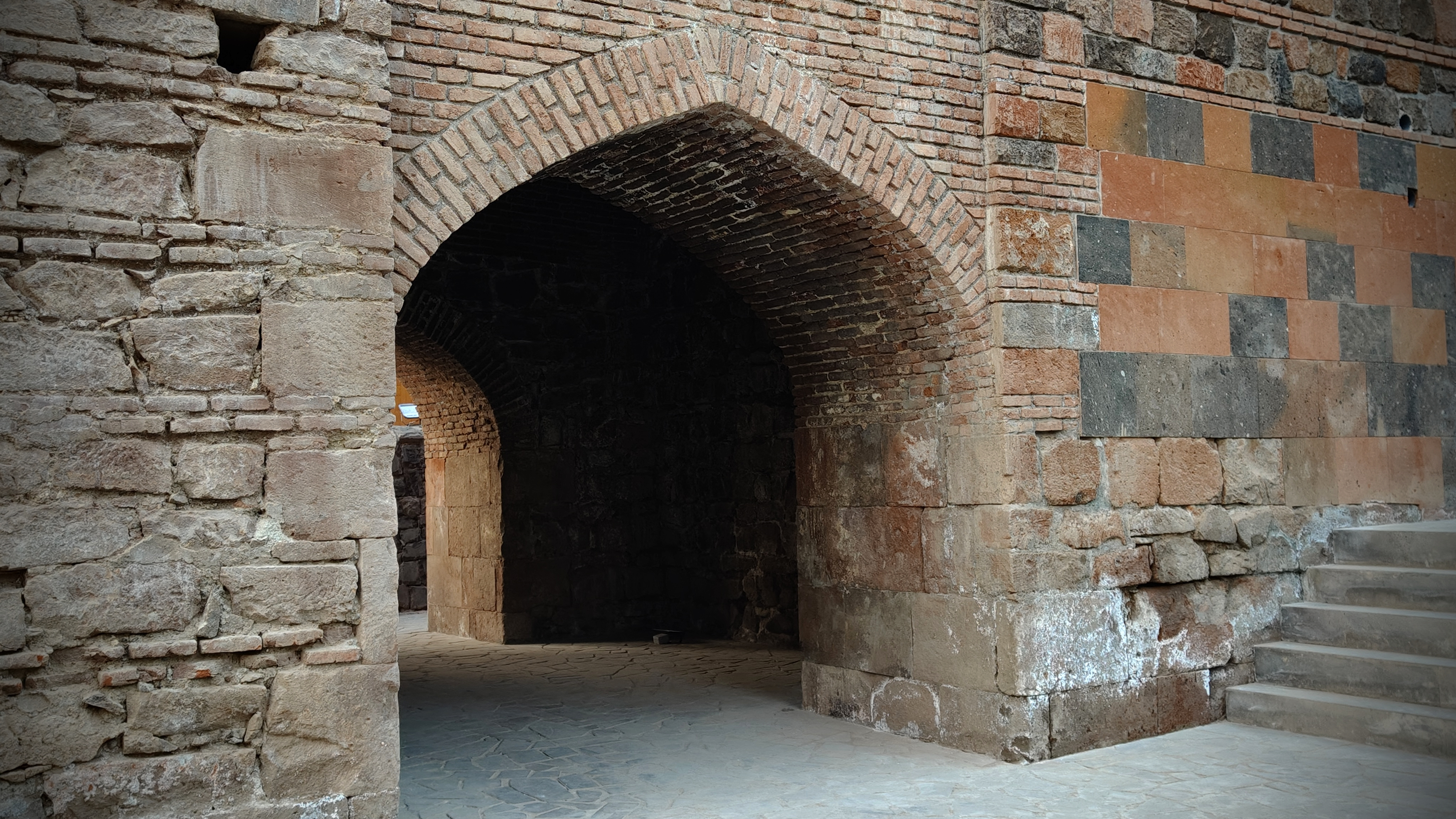
The bridge in 2025 after reconstruction

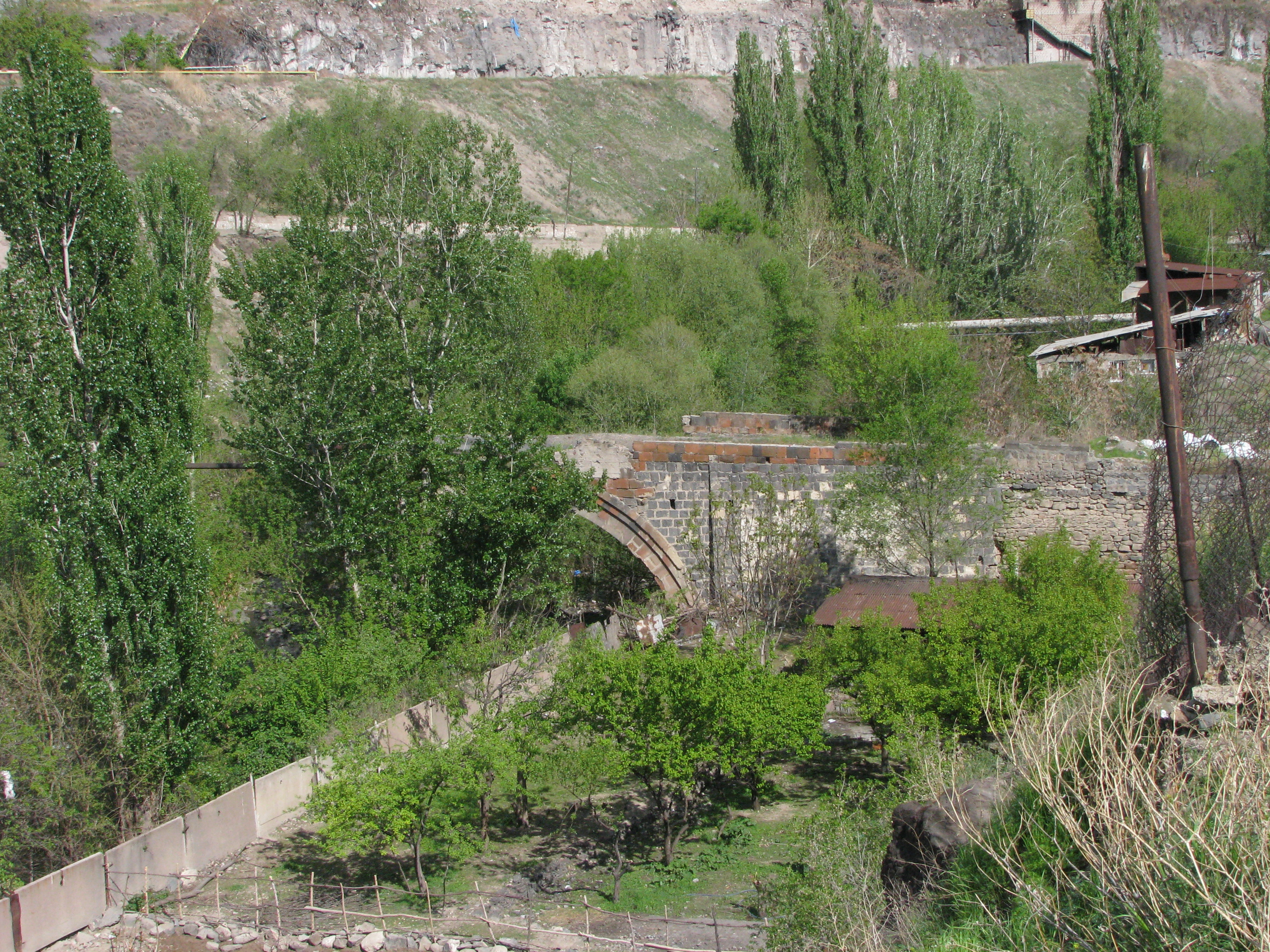
Ruins of the bridge before reconstruction

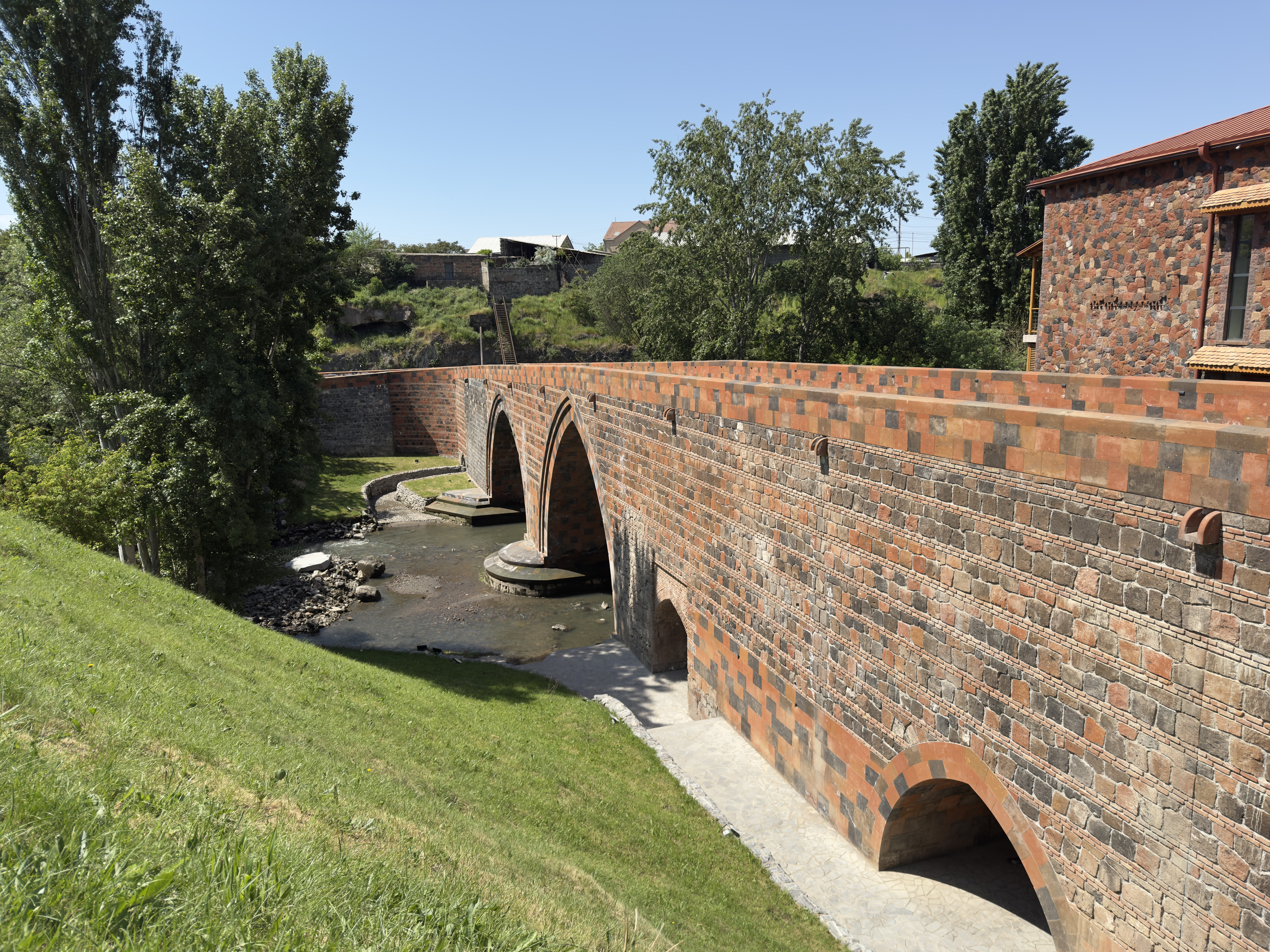

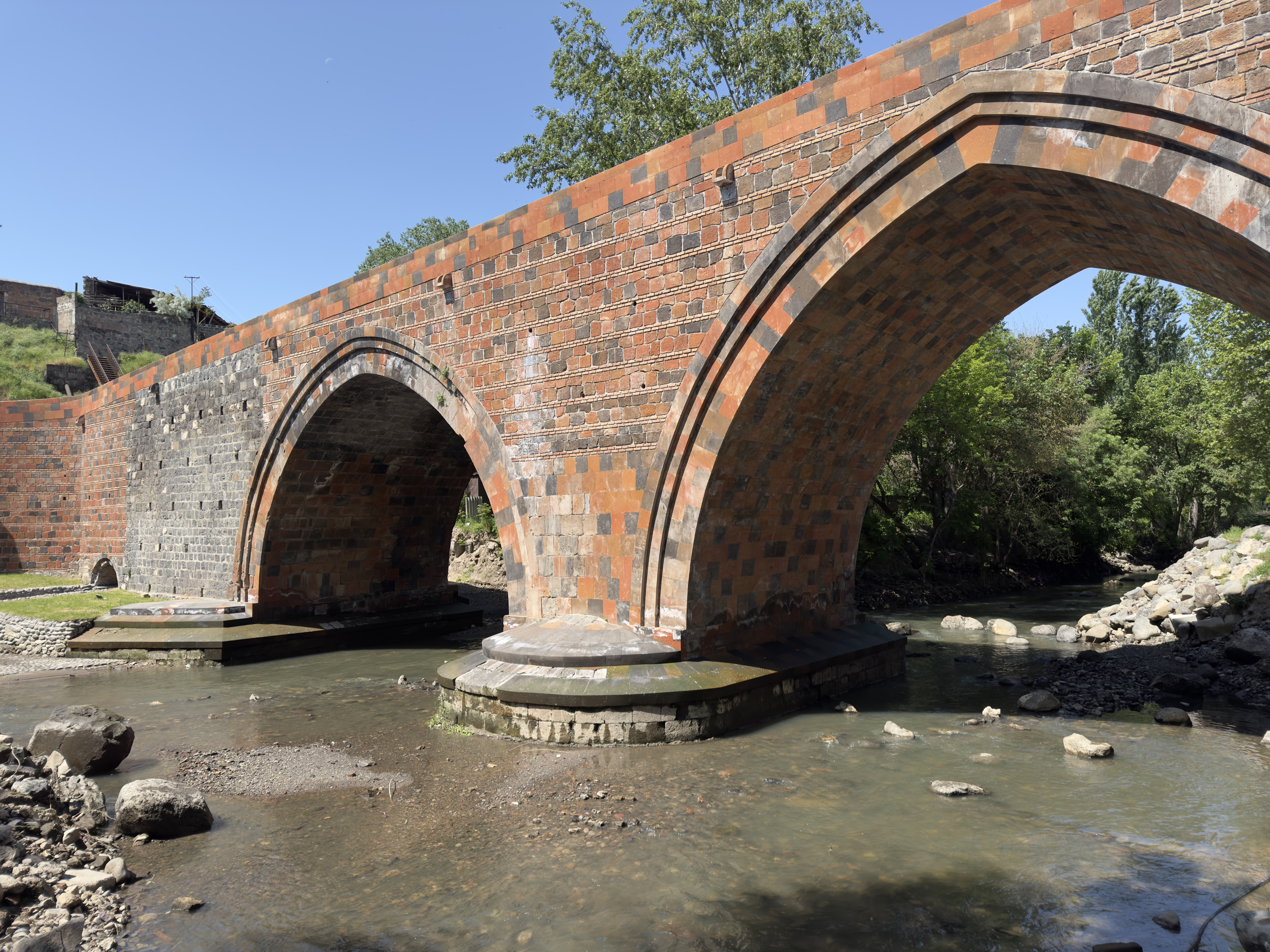
