= Vage Shakhverdyan =

Armenian stage director and politician (1945–2022)

Member of the National Assembly of Armenia
- In office 1995–1999

Personal details
- Born: 19 August 1945 Kirovakan, Armenian SSR, Soviet Union
- Died: 31 October 2022 (aged 77)
- Party: Independent
- Education: Yerevan State Institute of Fine Arts and Theater
- Occupation: Stage director

Vage Shakhverdyan (Armenian: Վահե Շահվերդյան; 19 August 1945 – 31 October 2022) was an Armenian stage director and politician. An independent, he served in the National Assembly from 1995 to 1999.

Shakhverdyan died on 31 October 2022, at the age of 77.
