= Holy Children Chapel, Vanadzor =

Chapel in Vanadzor, Armenia

Holy Children Chapel Սրբոց Մանկանց մատուռ
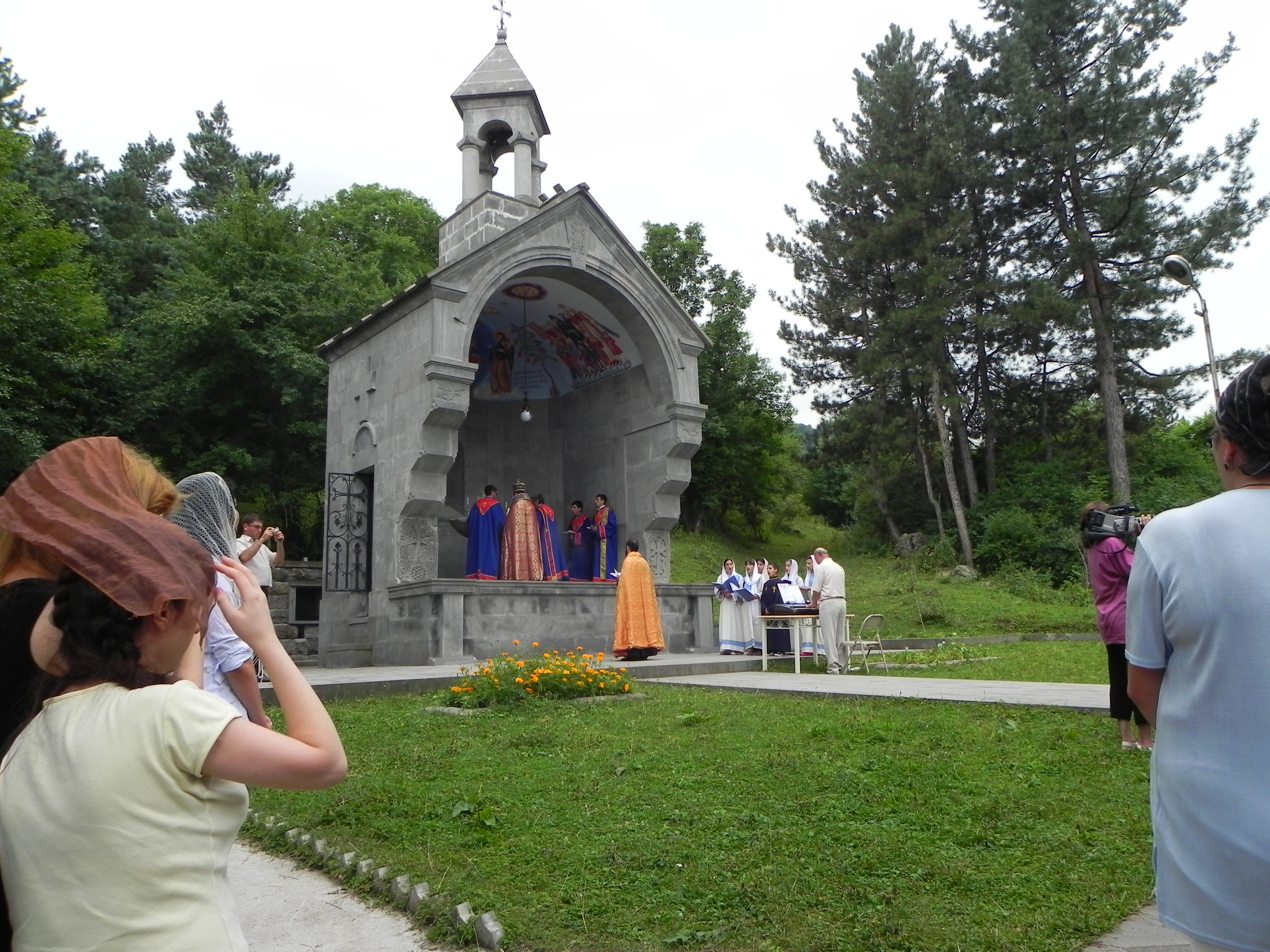
- The chapel during the Holy Mass

- Location within Armenia

Religion
- Affiliation: Armenian Apostolic Church
- Year consecrated: 2006

Location
- Location: In Tsiternak Children's Camp of the Diocese of Gougark, south to Vanadzor, Armenia
- Coordinates: 40.785495°N 44.486301°E

Architecture
- Architect: Bishop Sebouh Chouldjian
- Style: Armenian
- Completed: 2006

Holy Children Chapel of Vanadzor is located at Tsitsernak Children's Camp of the Diocese of Gougark south to Vanadzor, Armenia.

== Gallery ==
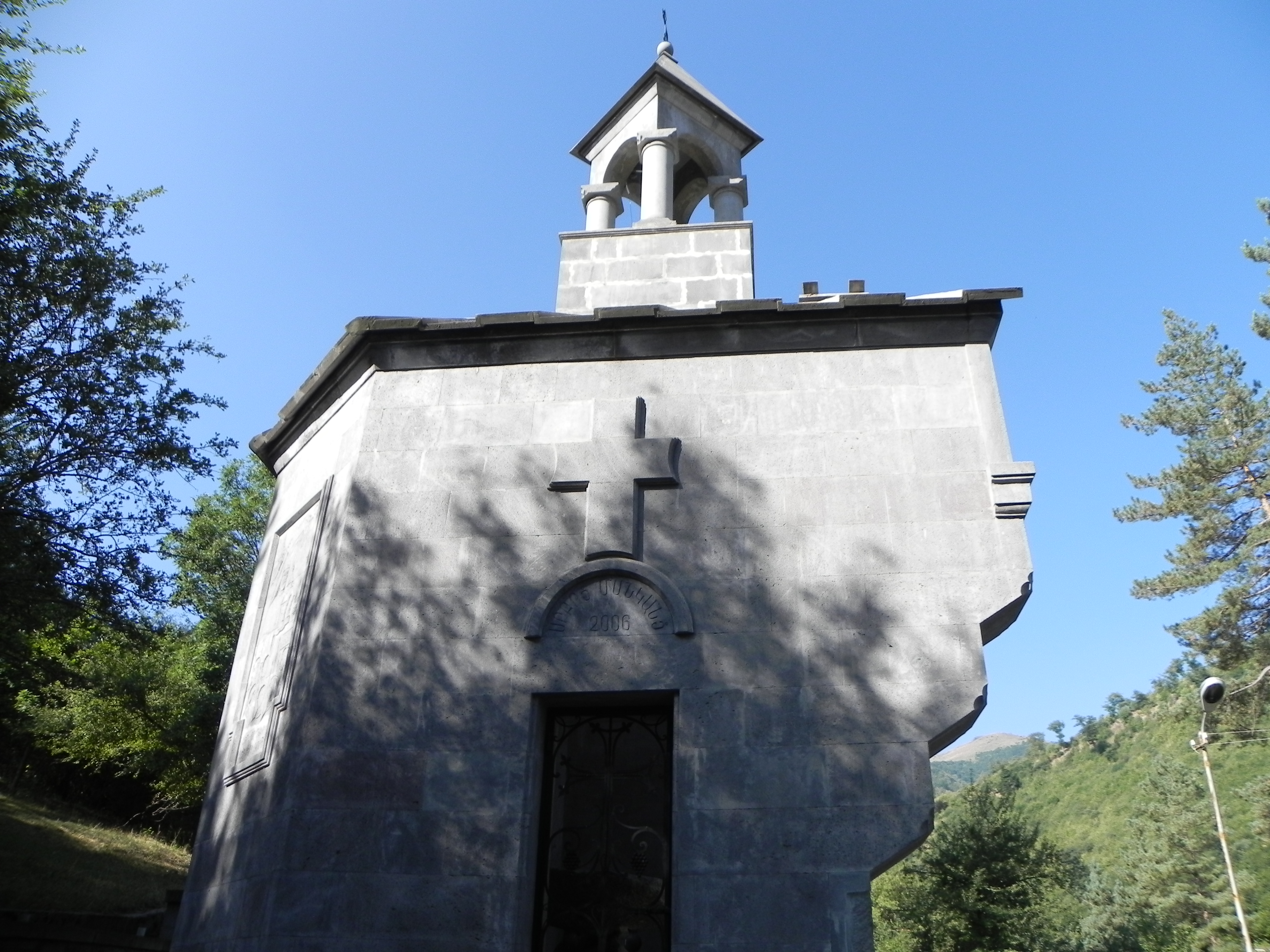
View from South

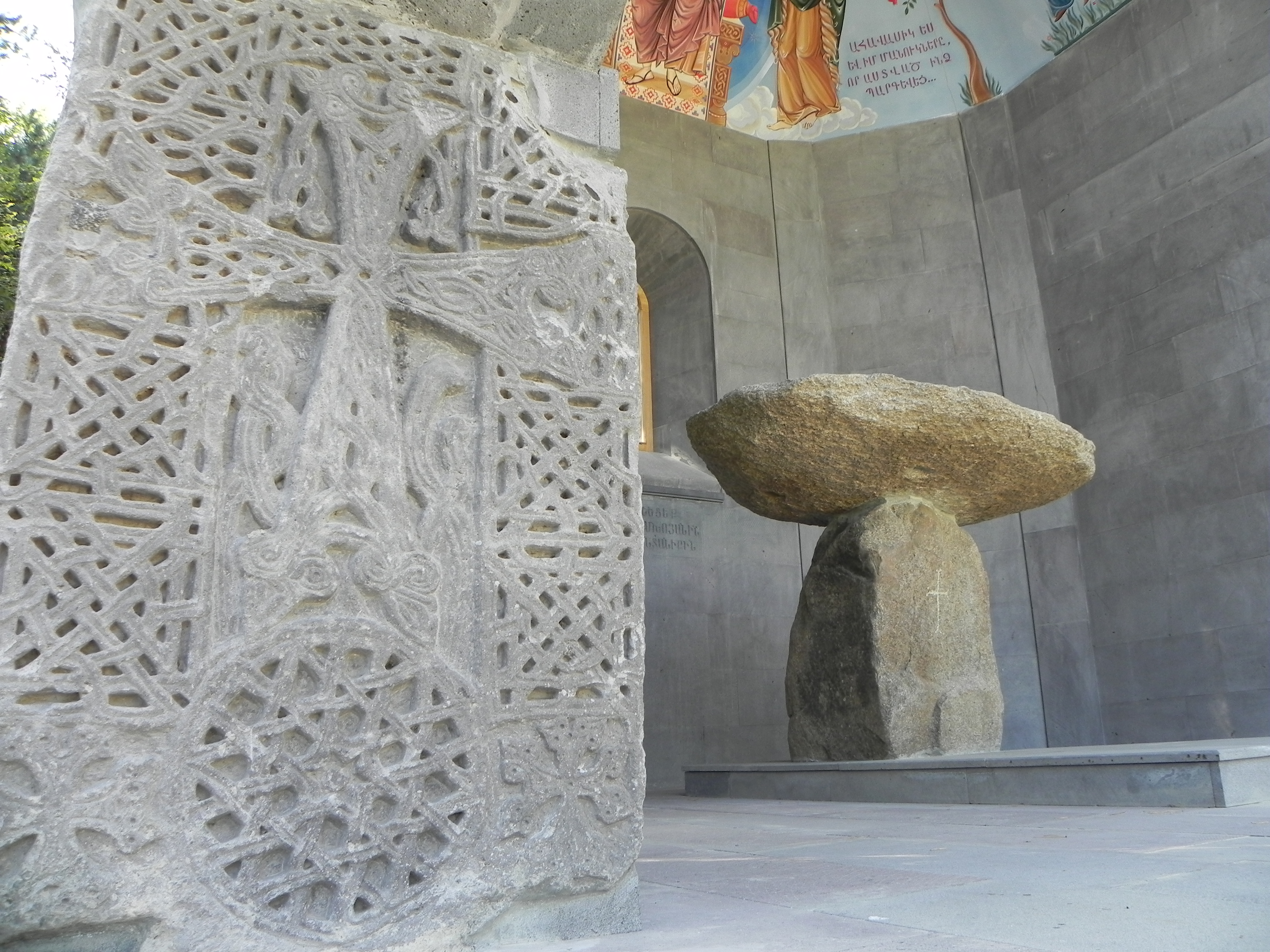
Khachkar

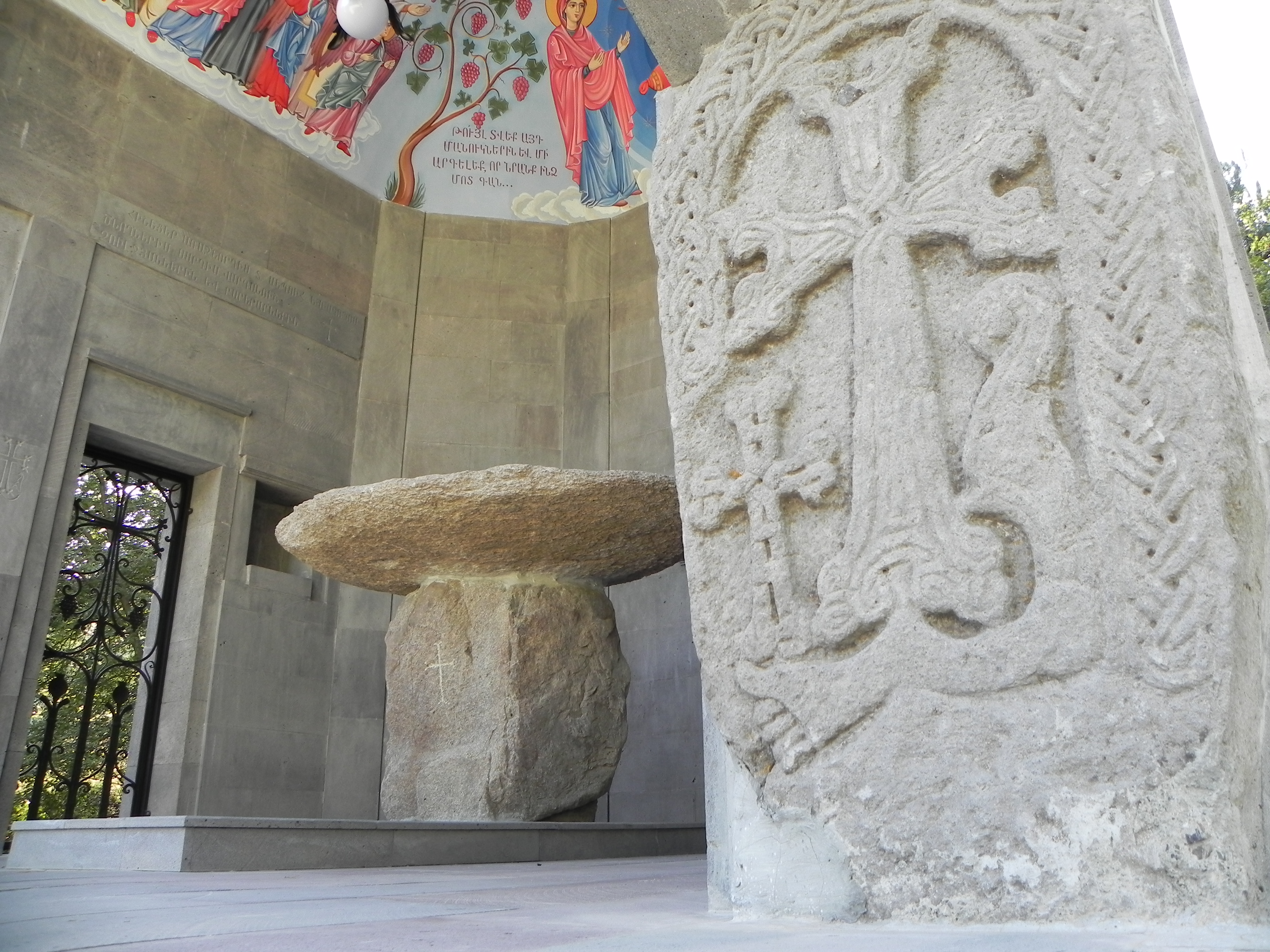
Khachkar

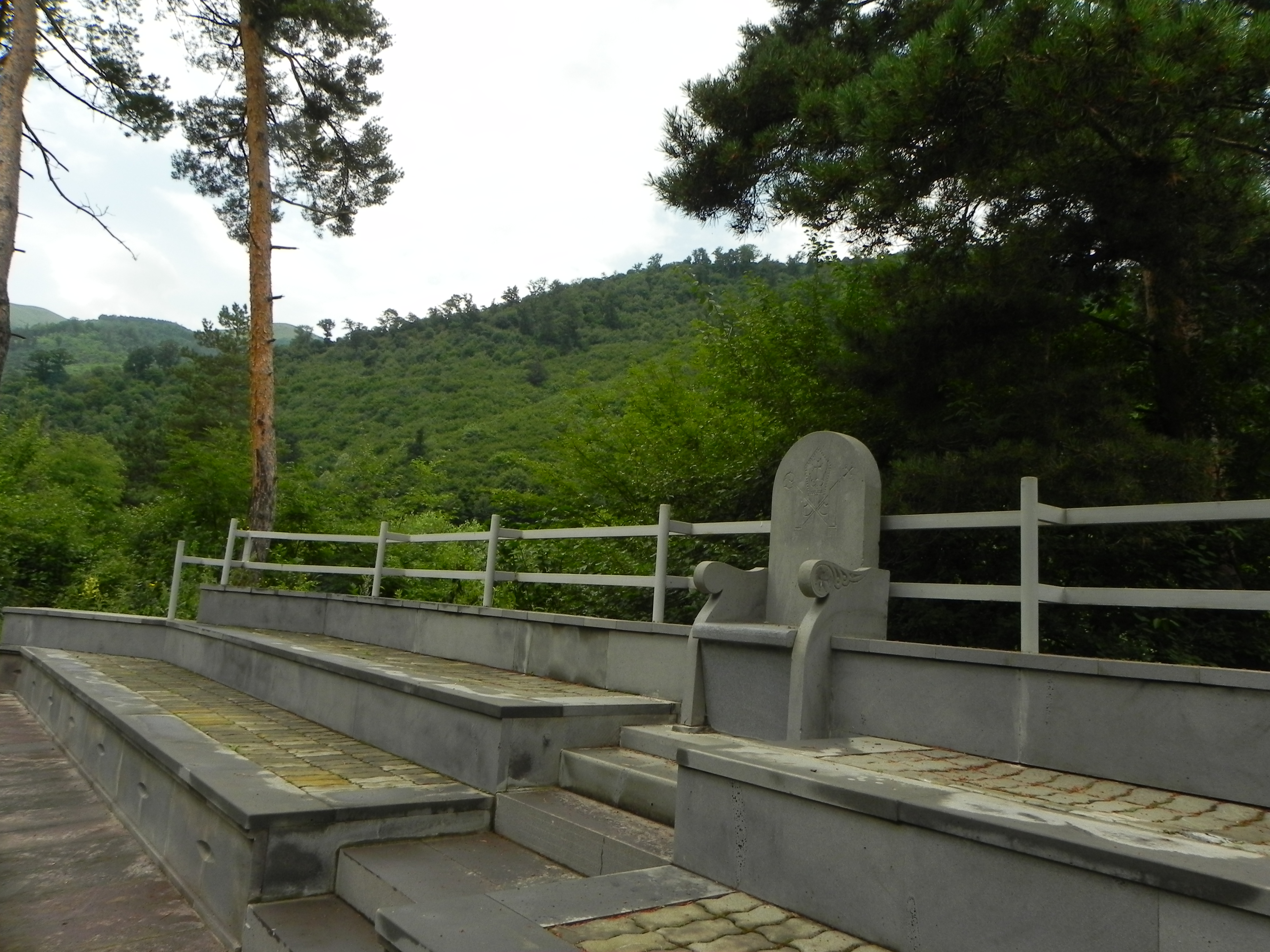
The front of the chapel

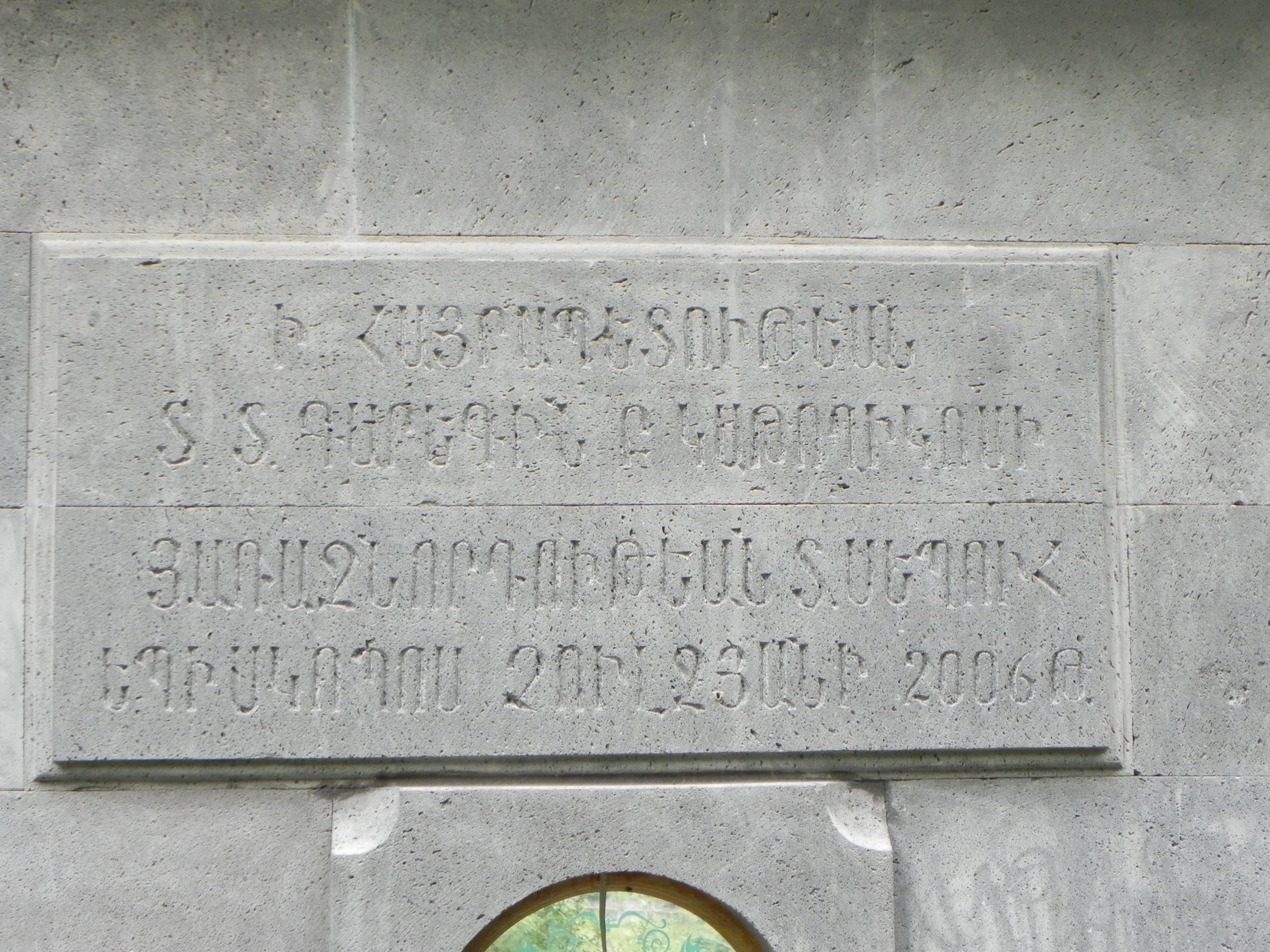
Inscription on the Eastern wall

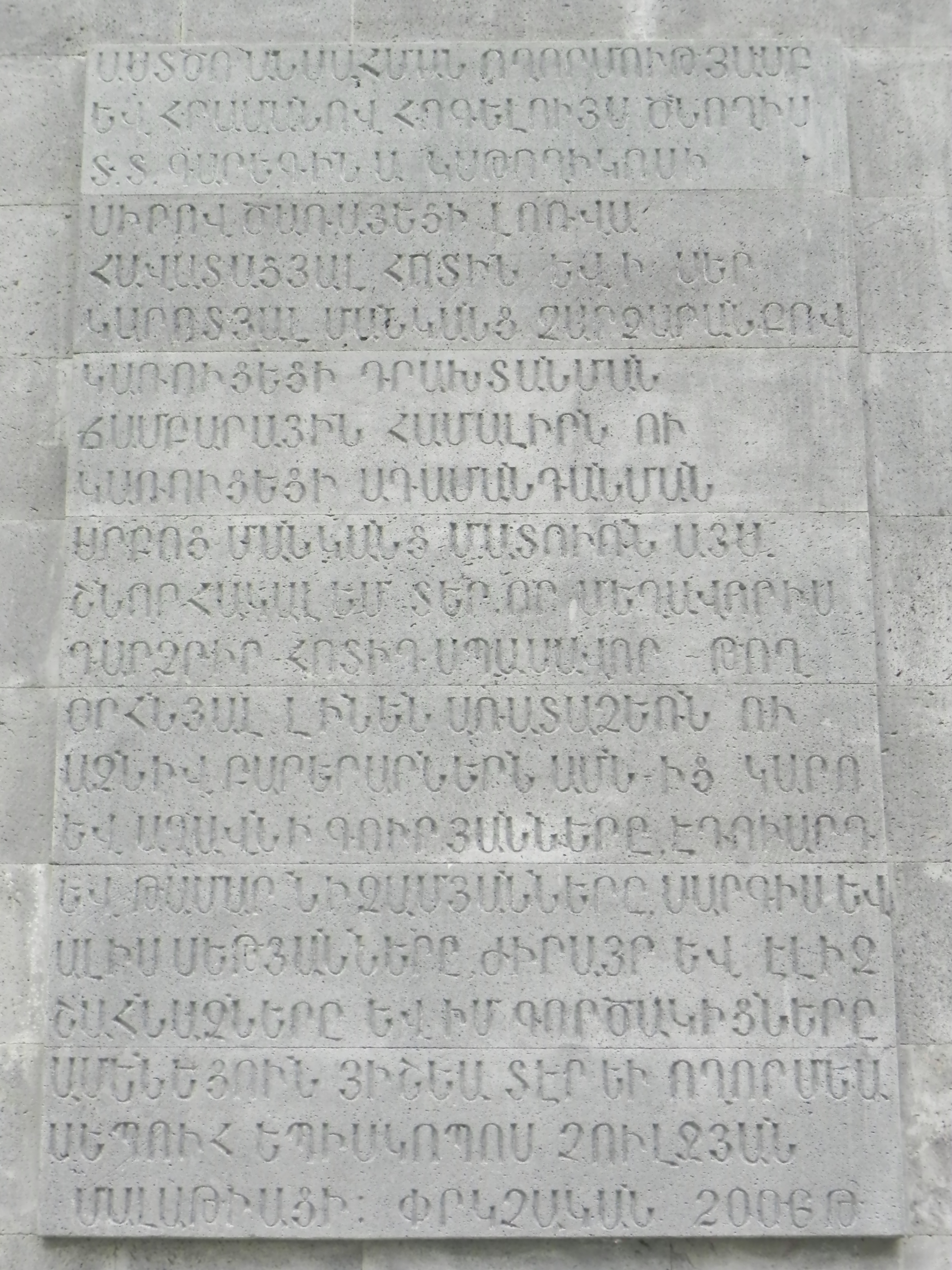
Inscription on the Northern wall

== See also ==
Diocese of Gougark
