= Vanadzor Fine Arts Museum =

Museum in Armenia

- ՎանաձորիԿերպարվեստի թանգարան
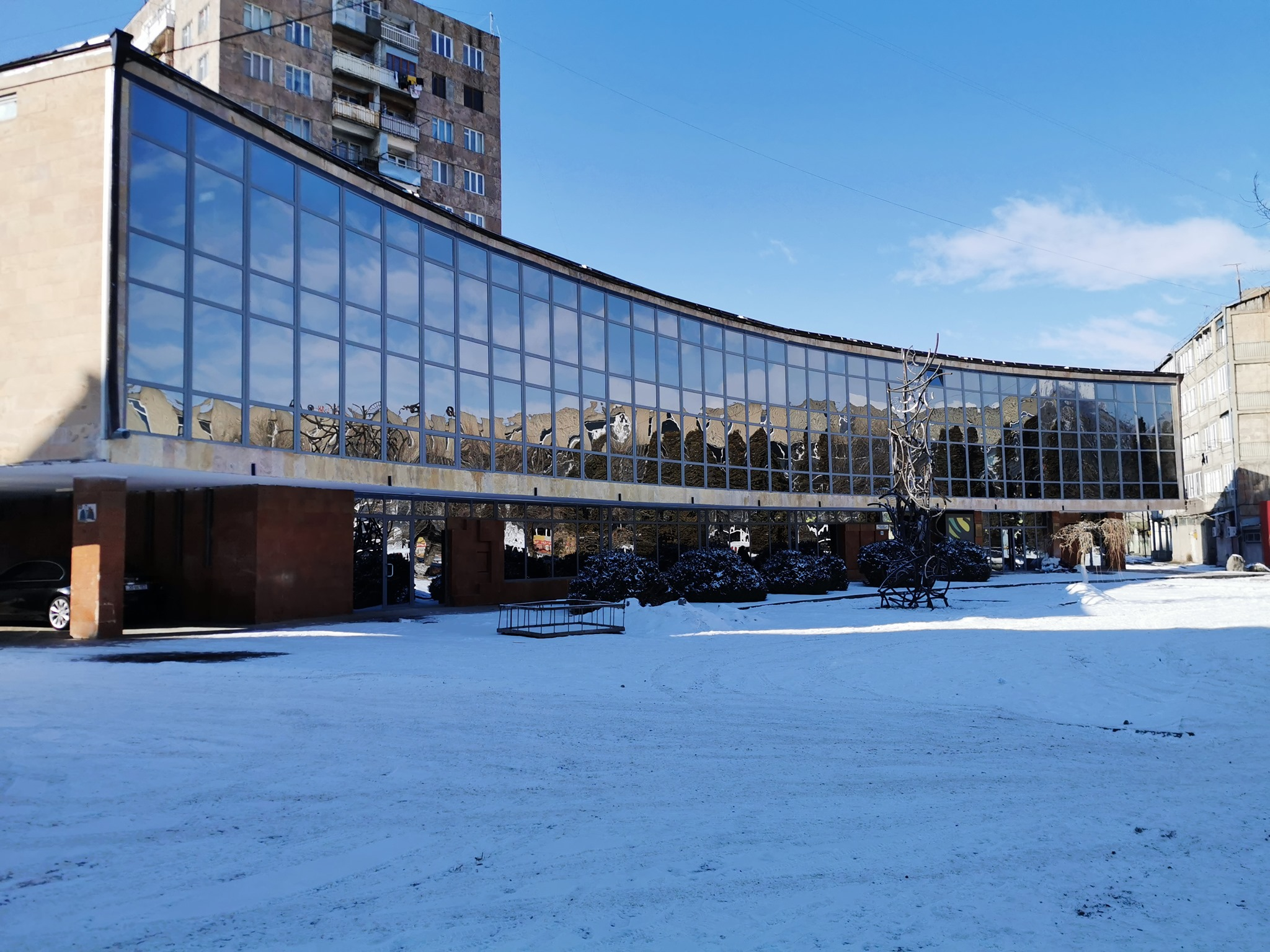
- The Vanadzor Fine Arts Museum
- Established: 1974
- Location: Vanadzor, Armenia
- Coordinates: 40°48′25″N 44°29′47″E
- Type: Armenian fine art
- Website: Official website

The Vanadzor Fine Arts Museum (Armenian: ՎանաձորիԿերպարվեստի թանգարան) was founded in 1974 as a branch of the National Gallery of Armenia. Five years later, in 1979, museum authority transferred to the Kirovakan City Council (today's Vanadzor Community Council), and in 2004 it was included in the Republic of Armenia's Historical and Cultural Monuments of Lori marz (province).

== Museum collection ==
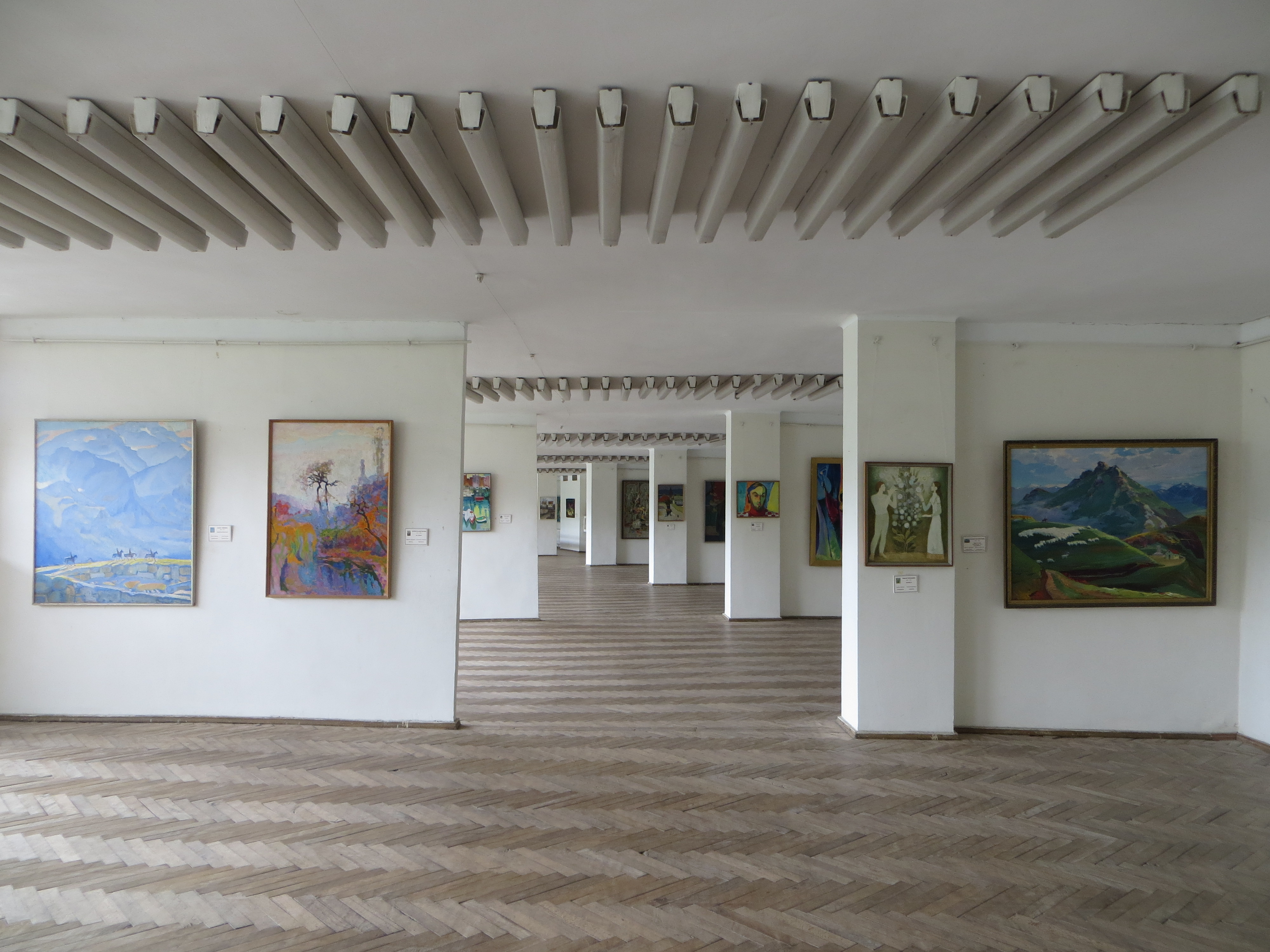
The Vanadzor Fine Arts Museum.

More than 1,700 works of art are exhibited in three public exhibition floors of the Vanadzor Museum of Fine Arts.

Work "Im aygin" by Hovhannes Zardaryan, Vanadzor Fine Arts Museum Collection.

The Museum exhibits Armenian fine art of the mid-20th century, particularly paintings, drawings, sculptures, and decorative arts, including works by Nikolay Nikoghosyan, Hakob Hakobyans, Armine Kalents, Grigor Khanjyan, Mariam and Eranuhi Aslamazyan, Mher Abeghyans, Artashes Hovsepyan and others.

The collection allows visitors to follow chronological trends of development of the Armenian painting school and modern Armenian art.

A separate gallery houses works of artists from Lori such as Karlos Abovyan (after whom the museum was named), Papag Aloyan, Vilen Gabazyan, Aram Nazaryan, and Khachik Gharabekyan.

== Museum programs and activities ==
The museum implements various projects together with different state cultural organizations and NGOs. The partners have presented the museum with a variety of resources, including equipment, material sources and art works contributing to the development of its collection
