= Vanadzor =

Vanadzor Վանաձոր
- City
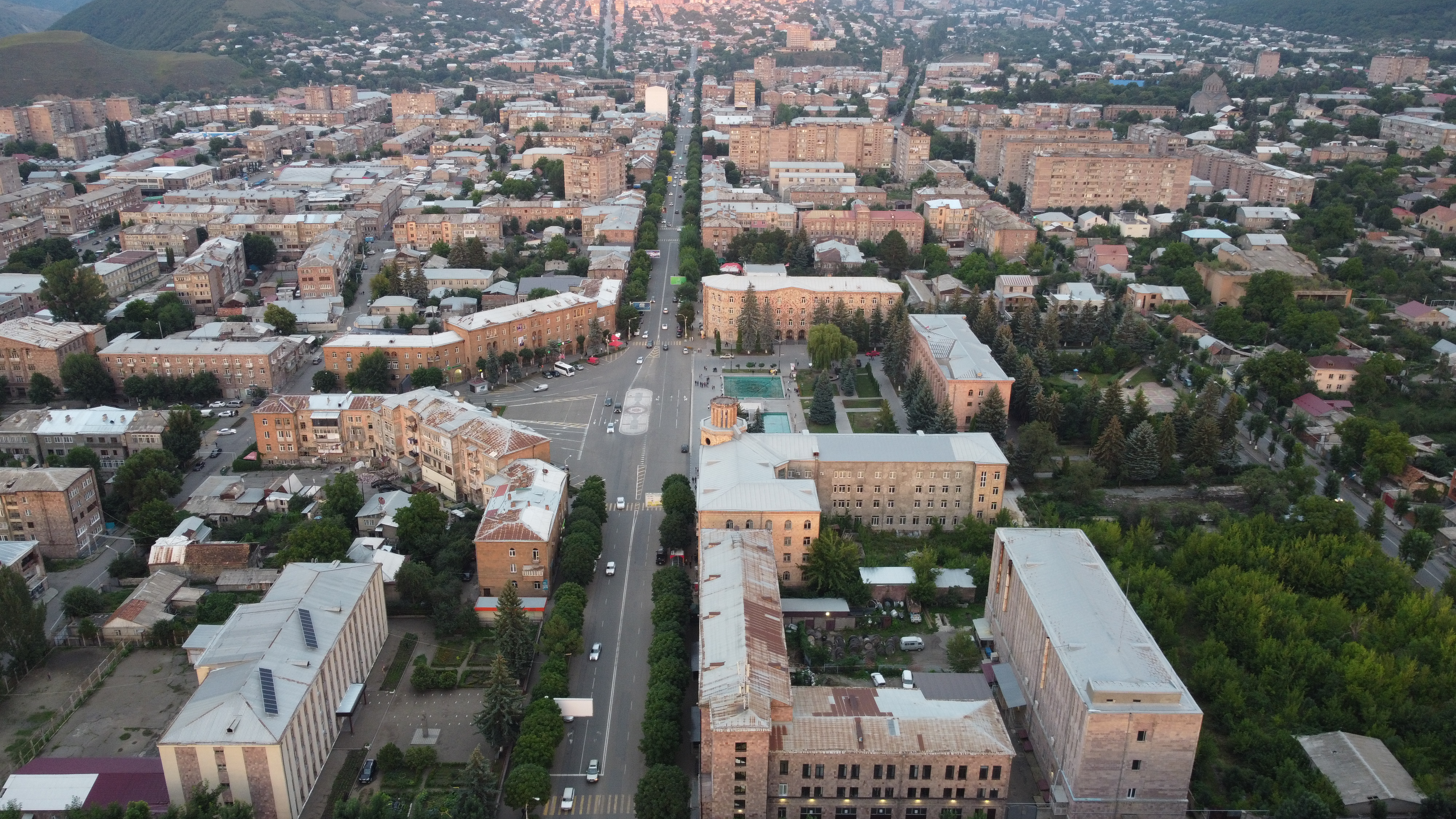
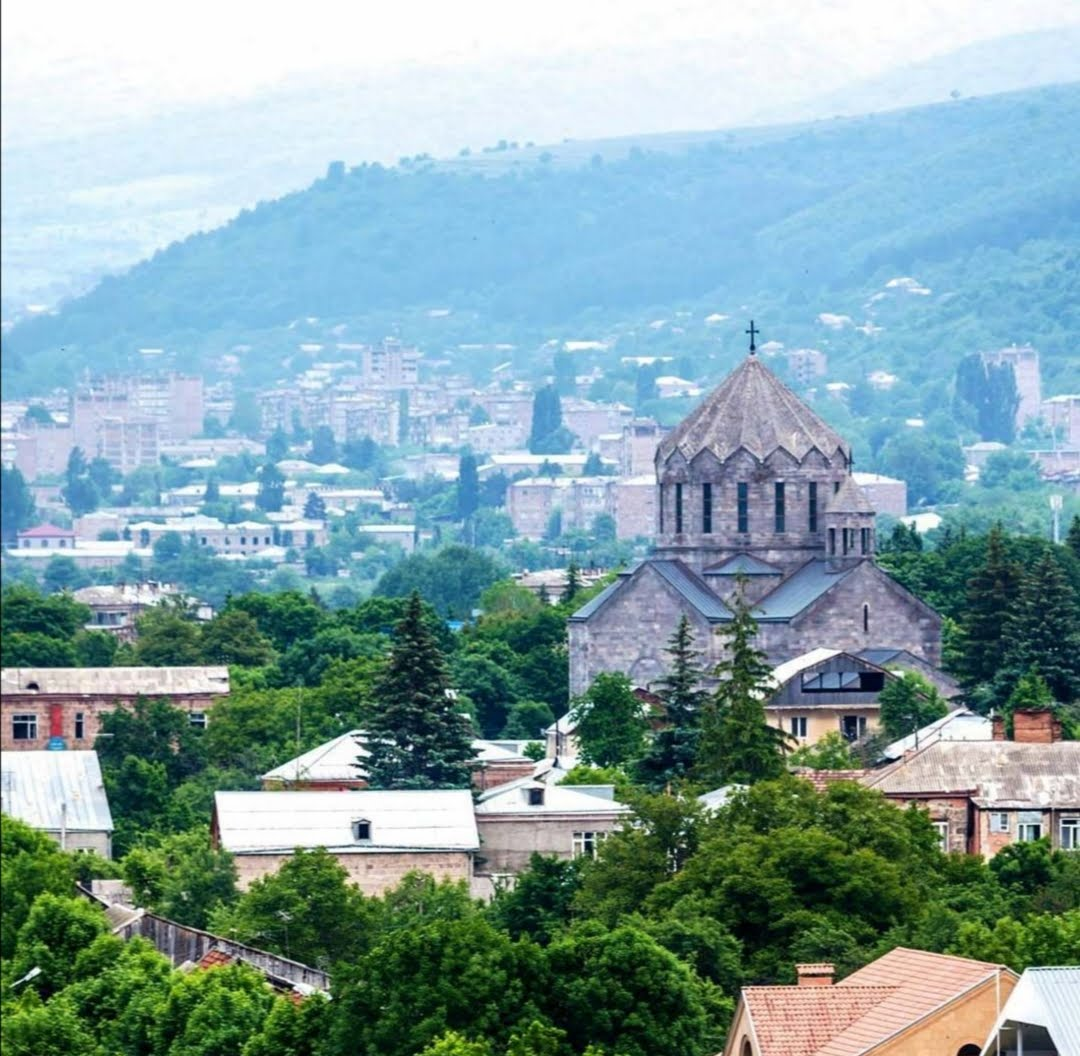
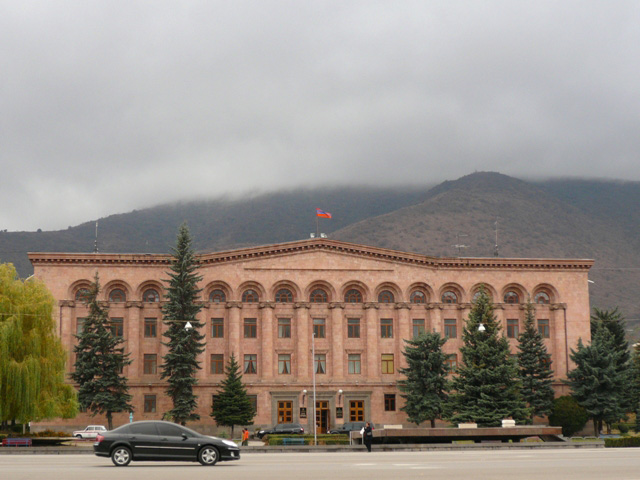
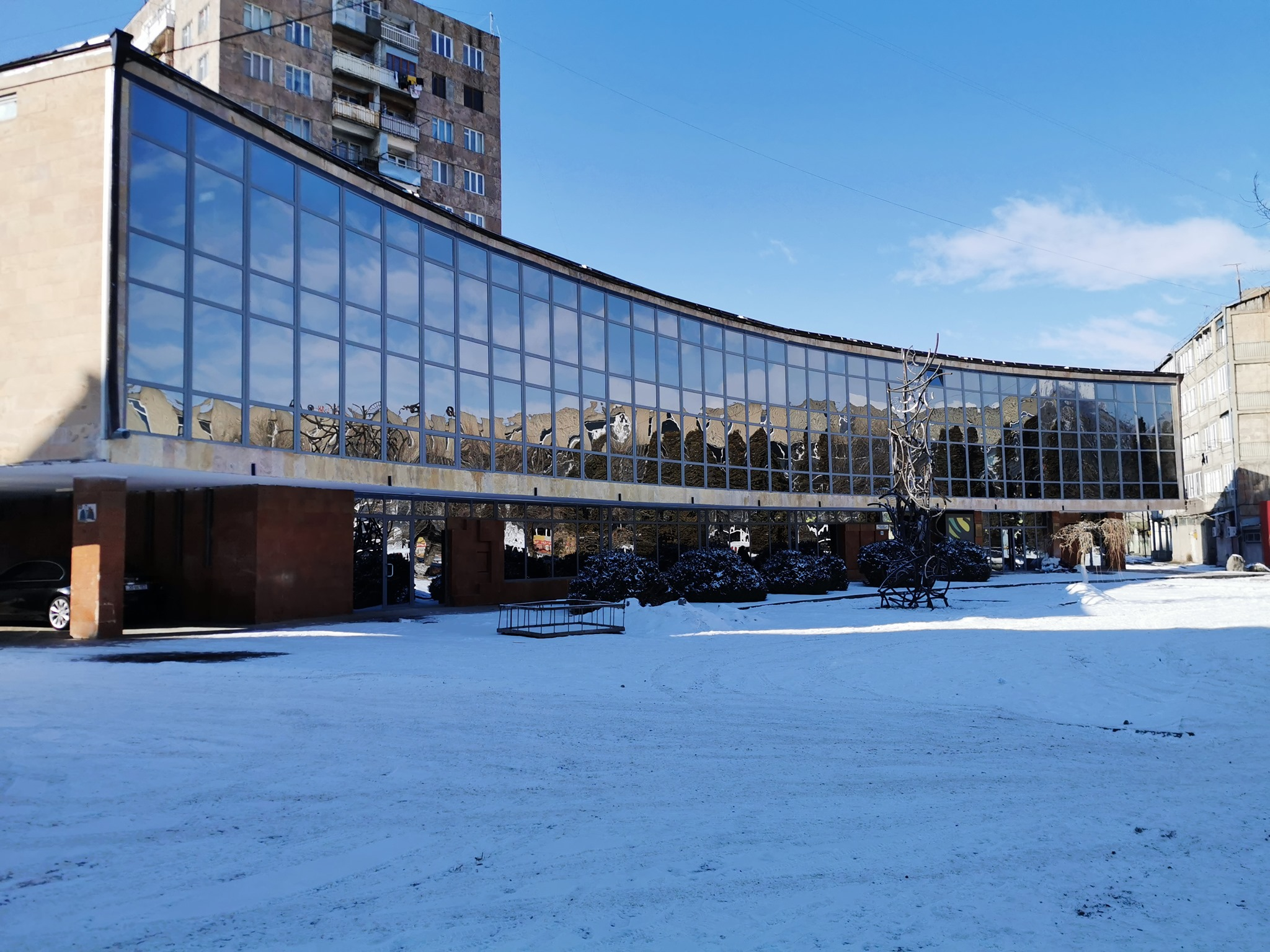
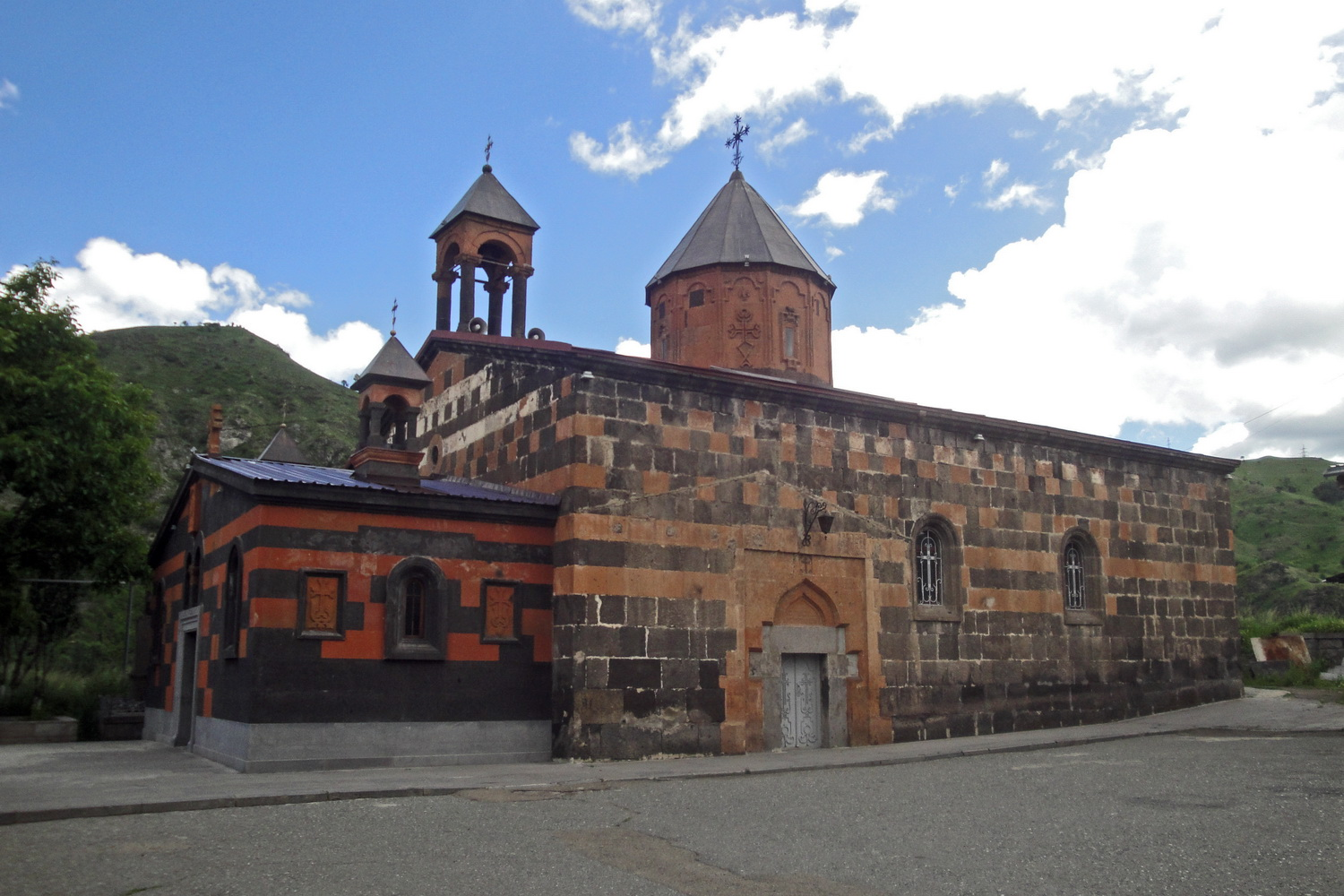
- From top down, left to right: Hayk Square; Diocese of Gougark • Lori Province administration Fine Arts Museum • Church of the Holy Mother of God

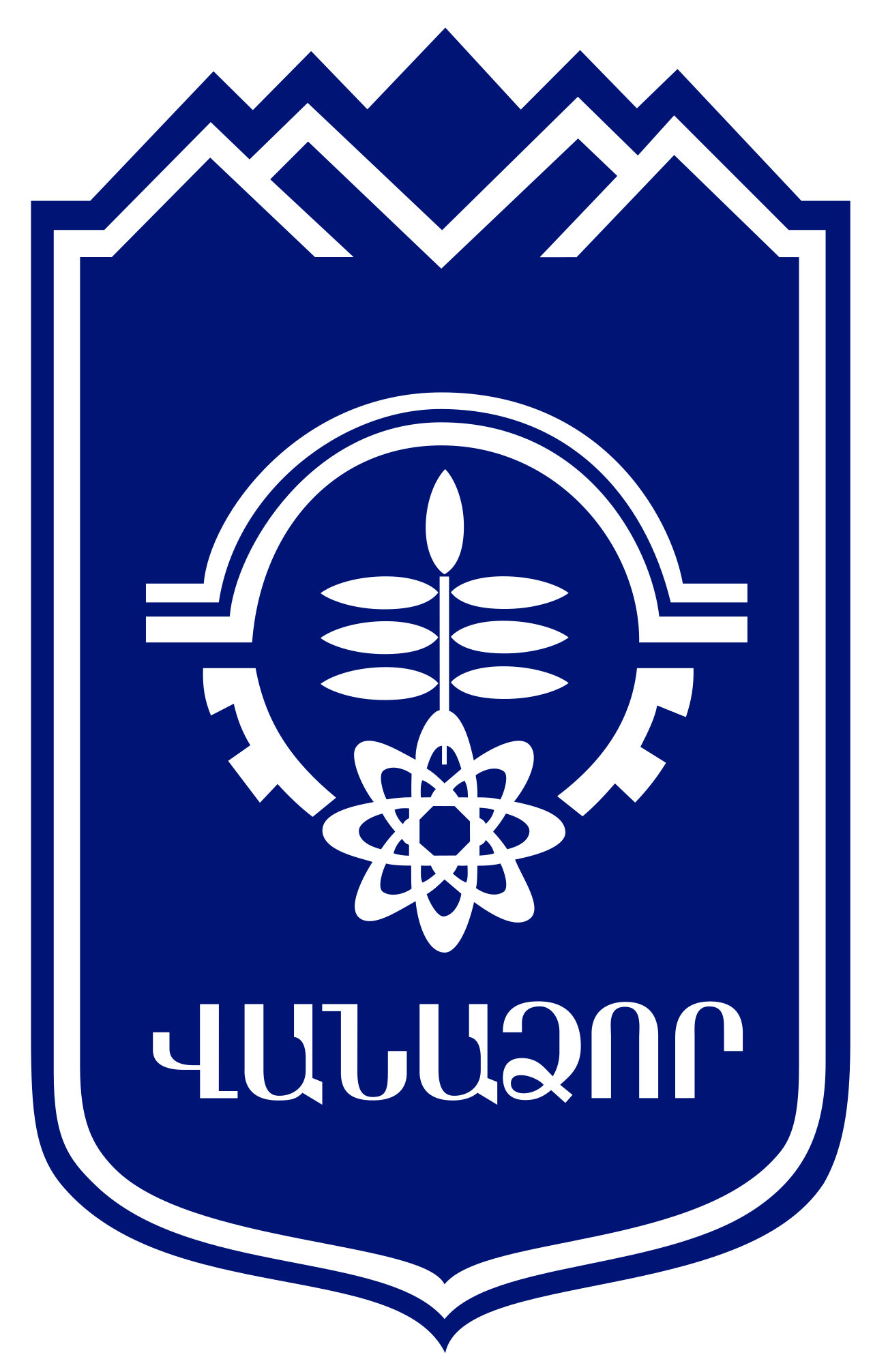
- Seal

- Location within Armenia
- Coordinates: 40°48′46″N 44°29′18″E
- Country: Armenia
- Province: Lori
- Founded: 1828

Government
  - Type: Mayor–council
  - Mayor: Arkadi Peleshyan

Area
  - Total: 32 km^{2} (12 sq mi)
- Elevation: 1,350 m (4,430 ft)

Population (2022)
  - Total: 75,186
  - Density: 2,300/km^{2} (6,100/sq mi)
  - Municipality: 84,400
- Demonym: Vanadzortsi
- Time zone: UTC+4 (AMT)
- Postal code: 2001-2024
- Area code: (+374) 322
- Vehicle registration: 36
- Website: Vanadzor official website

Vanadzor (Armenian: Վանաձոր, IPA: [vɑnɑˈd͡zɔɾ]) is an urban municipal community and the third-largest city in Armenia, serving as the capital of Lori Province in the northern part of the country. It is located about 128 kilometres (80 miles) north of the capital Yerevan. As of the 2011 census, the city had a population of 86,199, down from 148,876 reported at the 1979 official census. Currently, the town has a population of approximately 75,186 as of the 2022 census. Vanadzor is the seat of the Diocese of Gougark of the Armenian Apostolic Church.

== Etymology ==
In the official records of the Russian Empire, the city was labelled as Bolshoy Karaklis (Russian: Большой Караклисъ, lit. 'Greater Karakilisa'). Following the Sovietization of Armenia, the city was renamed Martunashen (Մարտունաշեն, alternatively Martunakan) in 1926 after Armenian Bolshevik revolutionary Alexander Miasnikian. In 1935, it was renamed Kirovakan, after the Russian Bolshevik leader Sergey Kirov. A close associate of Miasnikian and Aghasi Khanjian, Kirov had been assassinated on December 1 of the previous year. On 25 June 1992, after Armenia gained its independence, Kirovakan was renamed back to its initial name Vanadzor after the Vanadzor River which flows through the city. The name Vanadzor is composed of the Armenian words vank (վանք, "monastery") and dzor (ձոր, "valley"). Thus, the name of the city means "valley of the monasteries".

== History ==
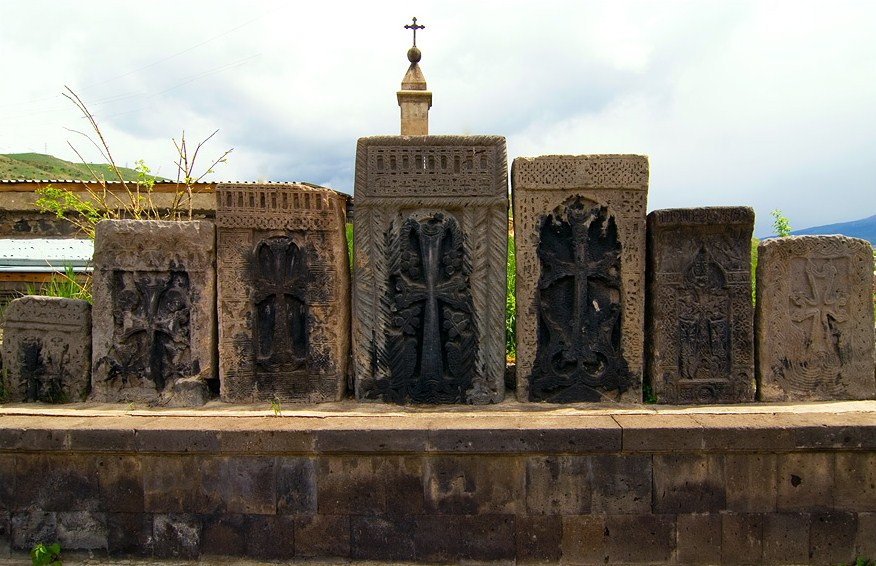
Old khachkars in Vanadzor

The area of present-day Vanadzor has been settled since the Bronze Age, based on the tombs and other historic remains found on the nearby hills of Tagavoranist and Mashtots. In antiquity, the area fell into the canton of Tashir of Gugark, the 13th province of the Kingdom of Armenia. Later, the region was ruled by the other Armenian dynasties of the Arsacids and the Bagratunis. The area was part of the Kingdom of Lori from the 10th century until the beginning of the 12th century. With the invasion of the Seljuk Turks, the region came under the rule of the Seljuk Empire. The settlement was called Gharakilisa (meaning black church in Turkic) by the Seljuks possibly as early as the 13th century, the name being taken from the black-stoned Armenian church of the Holy Mother of God on a nearby hill.

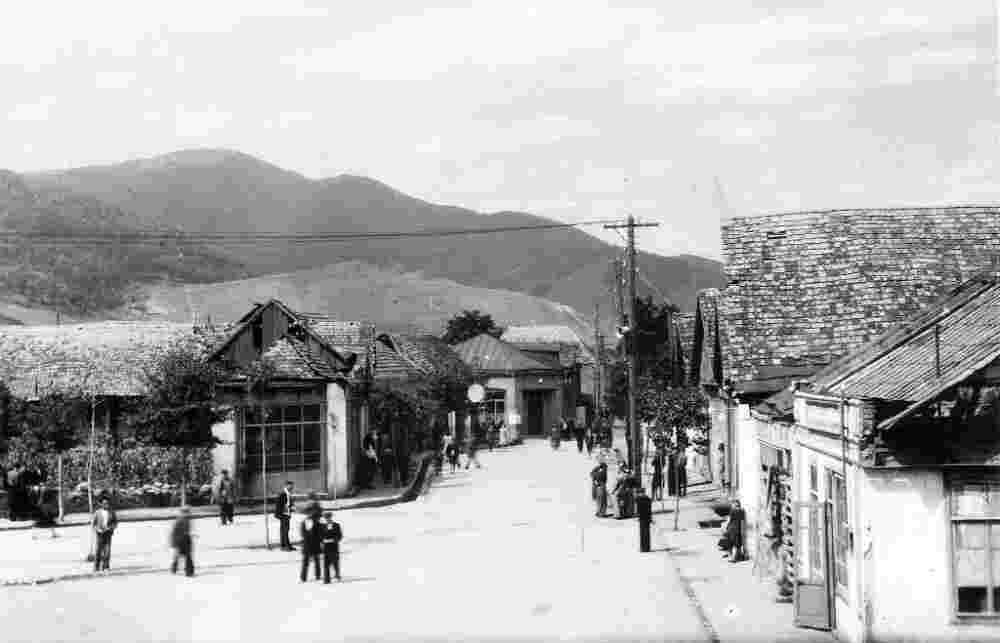
City center of Vanadzor in 1928

In 1801, the entire region of Lori became part of the Russian Empire along with the Georgian state. Lori was a strategically important territory for the Russian defensive forces on the border against Persia. In 1826, the settlement of Gharakilisa was entirely destroyed by Hasan Khan during the Russo-Persian war. In 1828, the Russians founded a new town as a major centre for the deployment of their troops during the Russo-Turkish War of 1828–29. According to Khachatur Abovian, the population of Gharakilisa was not more than 600 by the end of the 1820s, mainly consisting of migrants from Yerevan. In 1849, it became part of the Erivan Governorate within the Russian Empire. Under its new administrative status, Gharakilisa was flooded with many hundreds of migrating Armenian families from Kars, Ardahan and the Western Armenian cities of Karin (Erzurum) and Daroynk (Doğubeyazıt).

The town enjoyed a considerable uplift through the opening of the railroad towards Tbilisi in 1899. The vicinity of the town was the site of the Battle of Karakilisa in May 1918, when General Tovmas Nazarbekian's outnumbered troops, led by Garegin Nzhdeh successfully defended the region against the invading Ottoman Army, pushed them back just a few days after the crucial Armenian victory in the Battle of Sardarapat, thus allowing the Republic of Armenia to come into existence. On the North side of the Spitak-Vanadzor highway, about 2 km (1 mi) west of the city, there is a little shrine in the ruins of a church, the site of a planned monument to that battle.

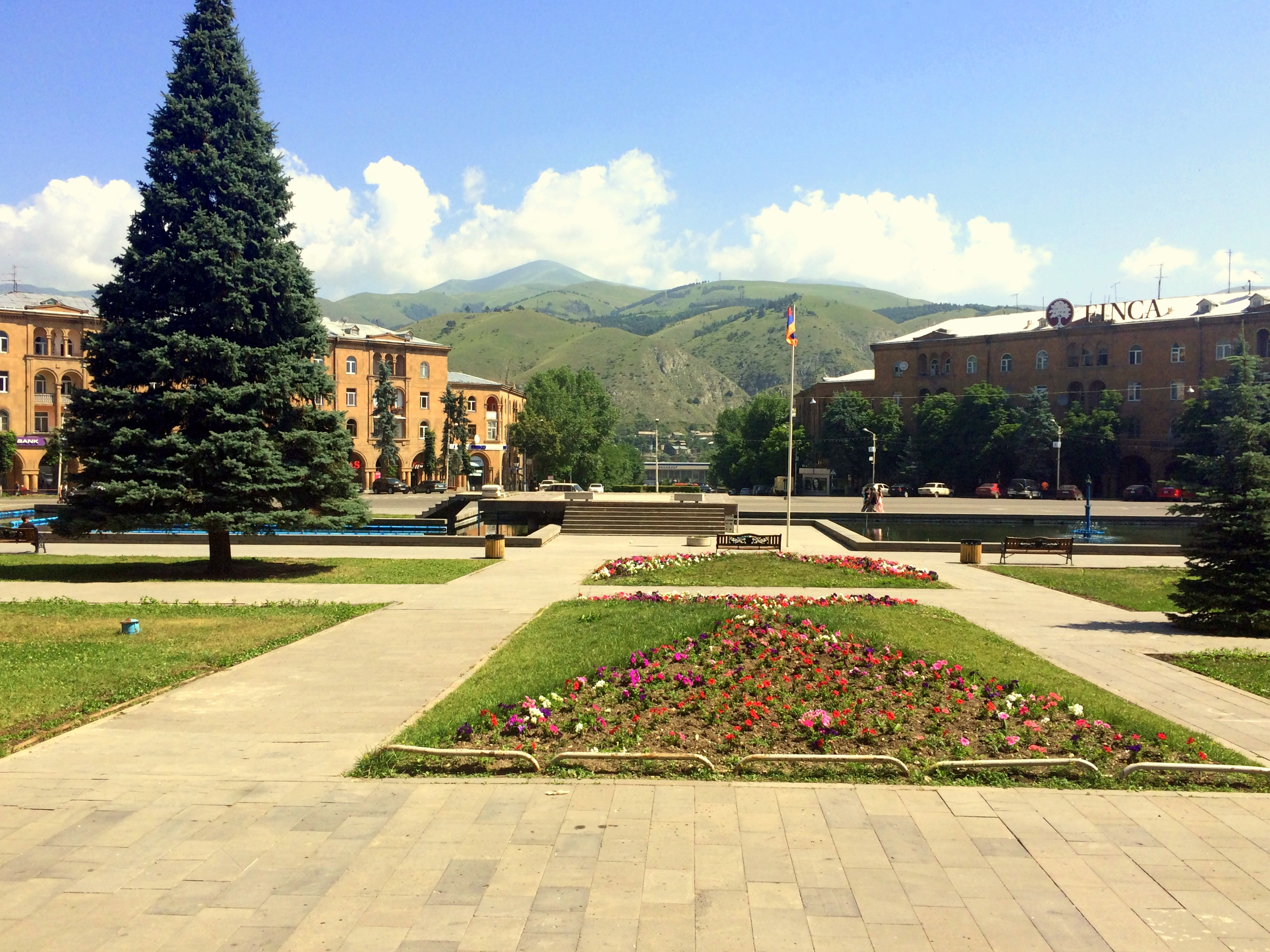
Downtown Vanadzor

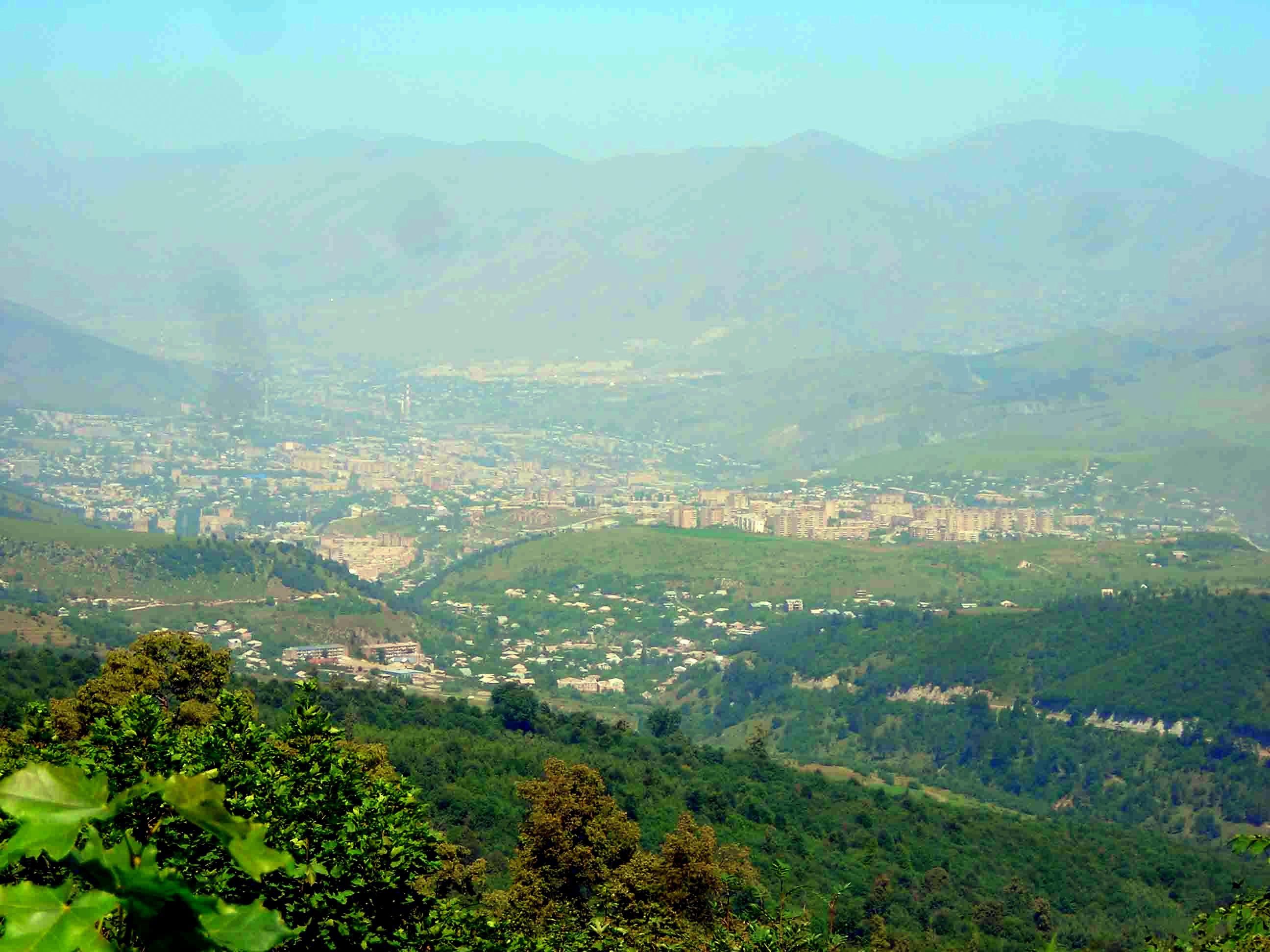
View of Vanadzor from the southeast

In 1920, after only 2 years of independence, Armenia fell under Soviet rule. The first city development plan for Gharakilisa, initiated by architects Karo Halabyan, Mikayel Mazmanyan and Gevork Kochar, was adopted in 1929–1930. Under the new plan, the town was enlarged towards the East and the West. In 1935, the Soviets renamed the city Kirovakan after the Bolshevik leader Sergey Kirov. In 1939, a new remodeling plan for the city, created by architects N. Zargaryan and A. Minasyan, was introduced to create an industrial district and a summer-resort area. The centre of the city was redeveloped during the 1950s. The central town square named after Sergey Kirov (now Hayk Square) was constructed along with the surrounding government and administrative buildings.

In March 1962, the city was visited by Anastas Mikoyan, who received a massive welcome from local residents. Behind the scenes, Mikoyan provided Armenian leaders with support for the Kirovakan Acetate Silk Plant, a major source of local employment. In addition to the plant, the 15th Motor Rifle Division of the Soviet 7th Guards Army was based at Kirovakan, under the authority of the Transcaucasian Military District.

Along with Leninakan and Spitak (25 km (16 mi) west), Kirovakan suffered a considerable amount of damage from the 1988 Armenian earthquake, which claimed the lives of 564 city residents. However, unlike the two other northern Armenian cities, the majority of Kirovakan's buildings were unscathed from the earthquake.

After Armenia gained its independence, Kirovakan was renamed Vanadzor after the Vanadzor River that flows through the city.

== Geography and climate ==
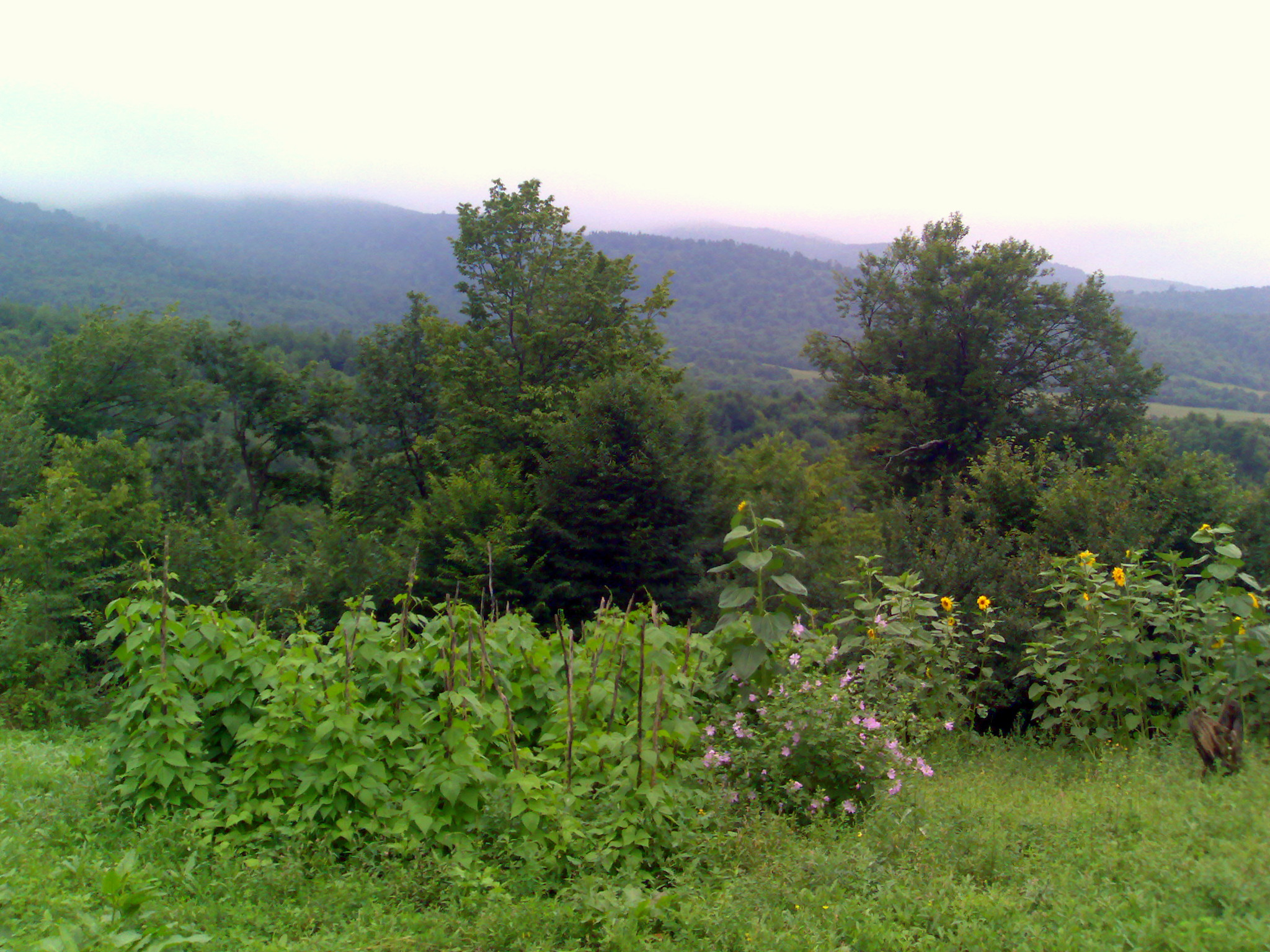
Forests around Vanadzor

Vanadzor, the capital of Lori Province, is located 128 km (80 mi) north of Yerevan and 64 km (40 mi) east of Gyumri.

At an average height of 1,350 metres (4,430 feet) above sea level, Vanadzor is located in the valley of Pambak River, on the point where the rivers of Tandzut and Vanadzor join the Pambak river. The city is surrounded by the over 2,500-metre-high (8,200-foot) mountains of Bazum and Pambak. The southern and eastern regions are densely forested while to the north and west are only covered with bushes and plants.

The climate of Vanadzor is characterized by warm summers and cold winters. The average temperature in winter is −8 °C (17.6 °F), while in summer it reaches up to 15 °C (59 °F). Vanadzor's climate is classified as warm summer humid continental (Köppen: Dfb). The amount of precipitation is around 570 mm (22.4 inches).

The Vanadzor Botanical Garden located in the southwestern edge of the city is one of the 5 botanical parks in Armenia.

Climate data for Vanadzor (Normals 1991-2020, Extremes 1981-2020)
Month	Jan	Feb	Mar	Apr	May	Jun	Jul	Aug	Sep	Oct	Nov	Dec	Year
Record high °C (°F)	14.1 (57.4)	16.8 (62.2)	24.4 (75.9)	29.4 (84.9)	30.0 (86.0)	33.5 (92.3)	37 (99)	36.1 (97.0)	35.8 (96.4)	30.1 (86.2)	22.5 (72.5)	19.9 (67.8)	37 (99)
Mean daily maximum °C (°F)	1.2 (34.2)	2.3 (36.1)	6.9 (44.4)	13.3 (55.9)	18.6 (65.5)	22.6 (72.7)	25.7 (78.3)	25.6 (78.1)	22 (72)	16.3 (61.3)	9.1 (48.4)	3.3 (37.9)	13.9 (57.1)
Daily mean °C (°F)	−2.0 (28.4)	−1.1 (30.0)	3.3 (37.9)	8.3 (46.9)	12.6 (54.7)	16.6 (61.9)	19.2 (66.6)	19.3 (66.7)	15.5 (59.9)	10.3 (50.5)	4.0 (39.2)	−0.2 (31.6)	8.9 (48.0)
Mean daily minimum °C (°F)	−8.5 (16.7)	−7.6 (18.3)	−3.3 (26.1)	1.6 (34.9)	6.3 (43.3)	9.5 (49.1)	12.3 (54.1)	12.2 (54.0)	7.8 (46.0)	3.3 (37.9)	−1.2 (29.8)	−5.5 (22.1)	2.2 (36.0)
Record low °C (°F)	−24 (−11)	−25 (−13)	−24.2 (−11.6)	−11.3 (11.7)	−3.5 (25.7)	0.3 (32.5)	4.0 (39.2)	2.5 (36.5)	−2.6 (27.3)	−7.3 (18.9)	−16.5 (2.3)	−21.7 (−7.1)	−25 (−13)
Average precipitation mm (inches)	18.9 (0.74)	24.4 (0.96)	41.4 (1.63)	68 (2.7)	95.3 (3.75)	86.1 (3.39)	58.8 (2.31)	40.7 (1.60)	40.8 (1.61)	45.1 (1.78)	31.4 (1.24)	19 (0.7)	569.9 (22.41)
Average precipitation days (≥ 1 mm)	3.9	4.9	7.5	10.9	14.8	12.1	8.6	6.9	6.1	7.6	5	4.2	92.5
Average relative humidity (%)	69.4	68.5	67	68.7	71.6	72.5	73	70.8	72.5	73.9	72.4	70.8	70.9
Mean monthly sunshine hours	140.3	145	158.4	149.8	194.7	217.9	197.1	196.7	193.2	165.3	145.2	125.6	2,029.2
Source 1: NCEI (Average max, min 1981-2010)
Source 2: worldweather.wmo(temperature normals)

== Demographics ==
=== Population ===
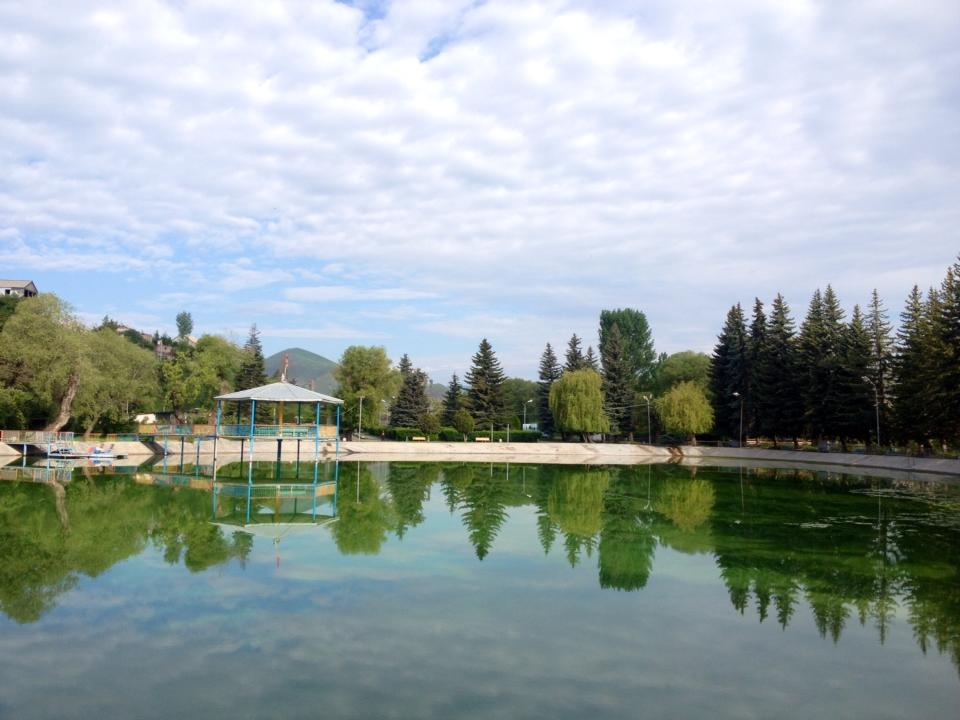
Vanadzor Central park

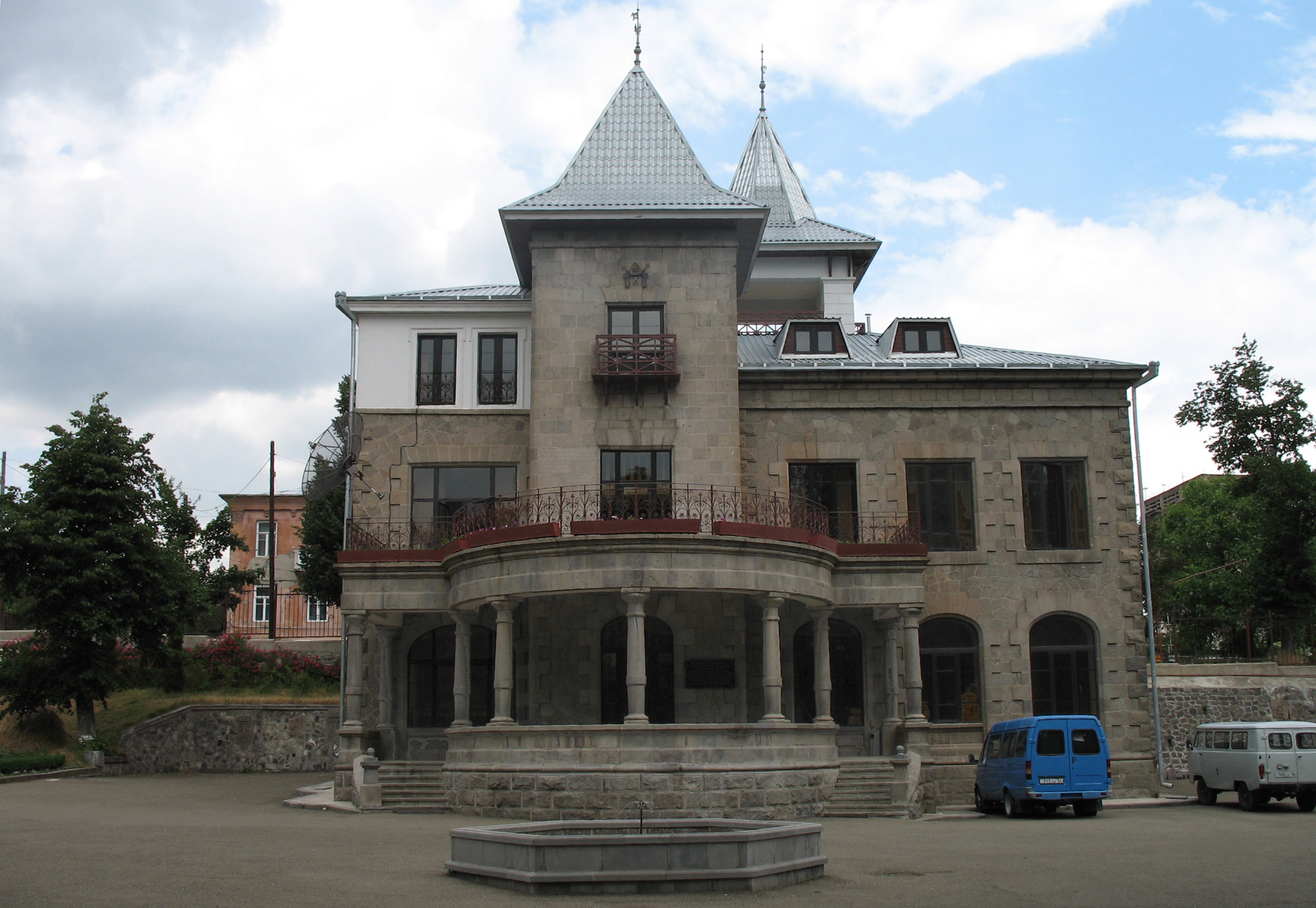
The Prelacy of the Diocese of Gougark

The population of Vanadzor has grown gradually since 1849, after becoming part of the Yerevan Governorate.

The population of Kirovakan-Vanadzor increased significantly after World War II, when Stalin allowed open immigration to the Armenian Soviet Socialist Republic with the promise of a better life for the arriving Armenians in the historical homeland. Armenians from different parts of Europe and the Middle East, most of them survivors of the Armenian genocide, immigrated and settled in Kirovakan. Due to the harsh conditions imposed by Soviet intelligence and the Ministry of Interior, many of the immigrants were sent to labor camps in Siberia and elsewhere. The reason for this treatment towards the Armenian immigrants was because almost all were more educated than the local community, spoke more than 3 languages, and were open followers of the Armenian Apostolic Church, something that was considered a threat to the national security by the Stalinist government. Despite the difficulties, more Western Armenians immigrated to Kirovakan during the following years. However, many of the immigrants left the city and returned to their diaspora countries, including Cyprus, Lebanon, Syria, Greece, France and the United States. Nowadays, approximately 2,000 Western Armenian settlers are living in Vanadzor, most of whom are still using the Western Armenian dialect in daily life.

While the majority of Vanadzor are ethnic Armenians, there are also small communities of Russian, Ukrainian and Greek population.

The population timeline of Vanadzor since 1831 is as follows:

Historical population
Year	Pop.	±% p.a.
1831	494	—
1873	2,017	+3.41%
1897	3,917	+2.80%
1915	6,671	+3.00%
1926	8,640	+2.38%
1939	17,607	+5.63%
1959	49,423	+5.30%
1979	148,876	+5.67%
2001	107,394	−1.47%
2011	86,199	−2.17%
2022	75,186	−1.23%

=== Religion ===
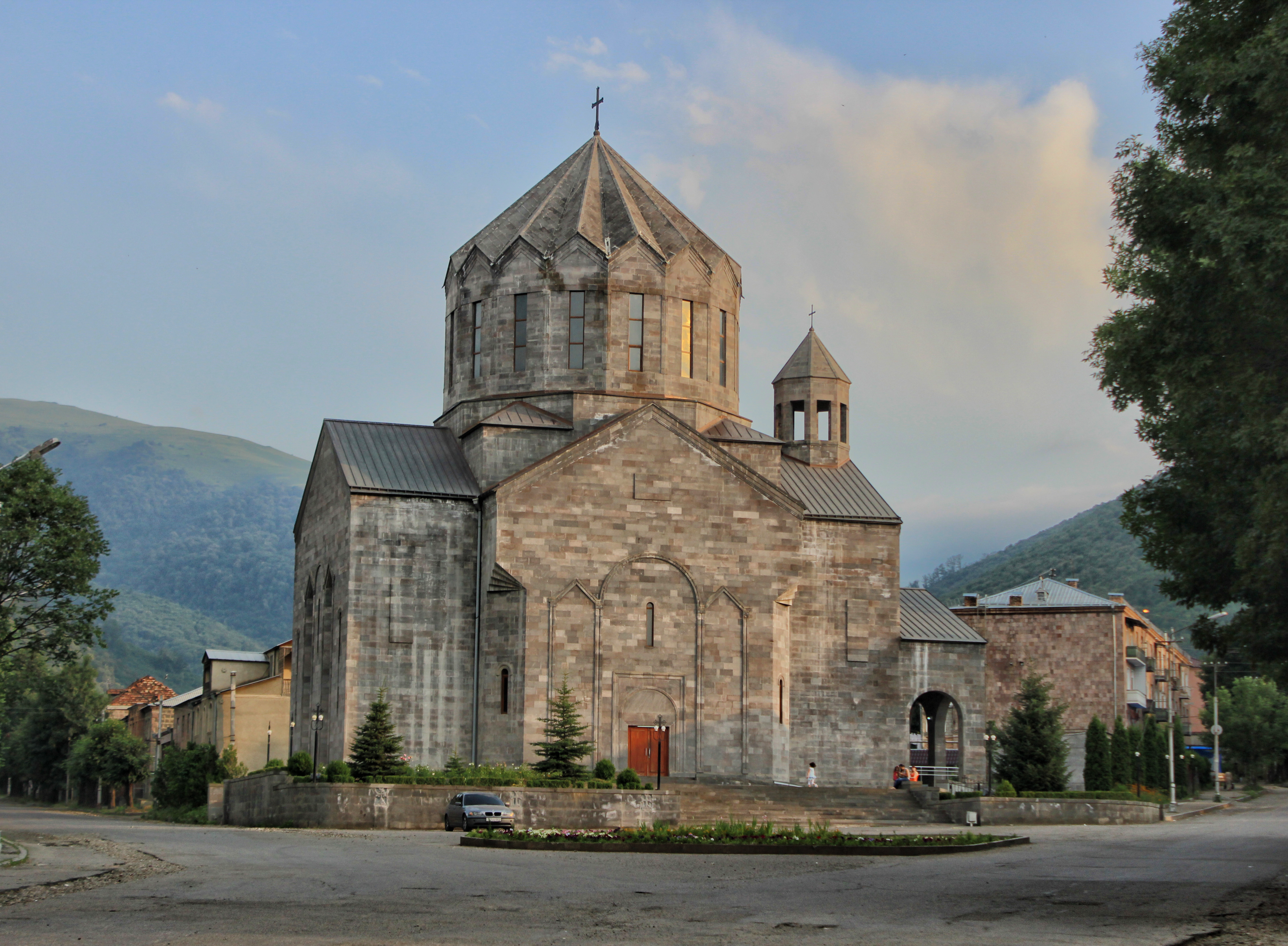
Saint Gregory of Narek Cathedral

The majority of the population belongs to the Armenian Apostolic Church. Vanadzor is the seat of the Diocese of Gougark of the Armenian Apostolic Church, serving the population of Lori province.

As of 2016, The city is home to 4 churches and 2 chapels:

- Church of the Holy Mother of God: opened in 1831, also known as Gharakilisa 'black church', is one of the oldest preserved churches of the city. It was completely renovated in 1999.
- Kamakatar Chapel, located at the northeast of the city (although it originally dates back to the medieval period). Despite dating back to the medieval period, the current building was reconstructed in 1841.
- Church of the Nativity of Blessed Virgin Mary, opened in 1895, is serving the city's small Russian Orthodox community.
- Surp Sarkis Church of Vanadzor, opened in 2000, is located near the prelacy building.
- Saint Gregory of Narek Cathedral, opened in 2005, is named after Saint Gregory of Narek to commemorate the 1000th anniversary of his Book of Lamentations. It is currently the seat of the Diocese of Gougark of the Armenian Apostolic Church
- Holy Children Chapel opened in the Tsitsernak children's camp of Vanadzor in 2006.

Many residents of Vanadzor are traditionally members of the Armenian Evangelical Church, which was first established by arriving Protestant Western Armenians in 1946. Although at that time any religious activity was punishable by law, followers of the Evangelical tradition continued practicing their faith and gathered secretly in basements to avoid deportation to Siberia. Particularly Armenians of Musa Dagh (Musa Ler) became pioneers of Evangelical faith and adherence to their traditions despite continuous threats by the police and the neighborhood watch.

== Culture ==
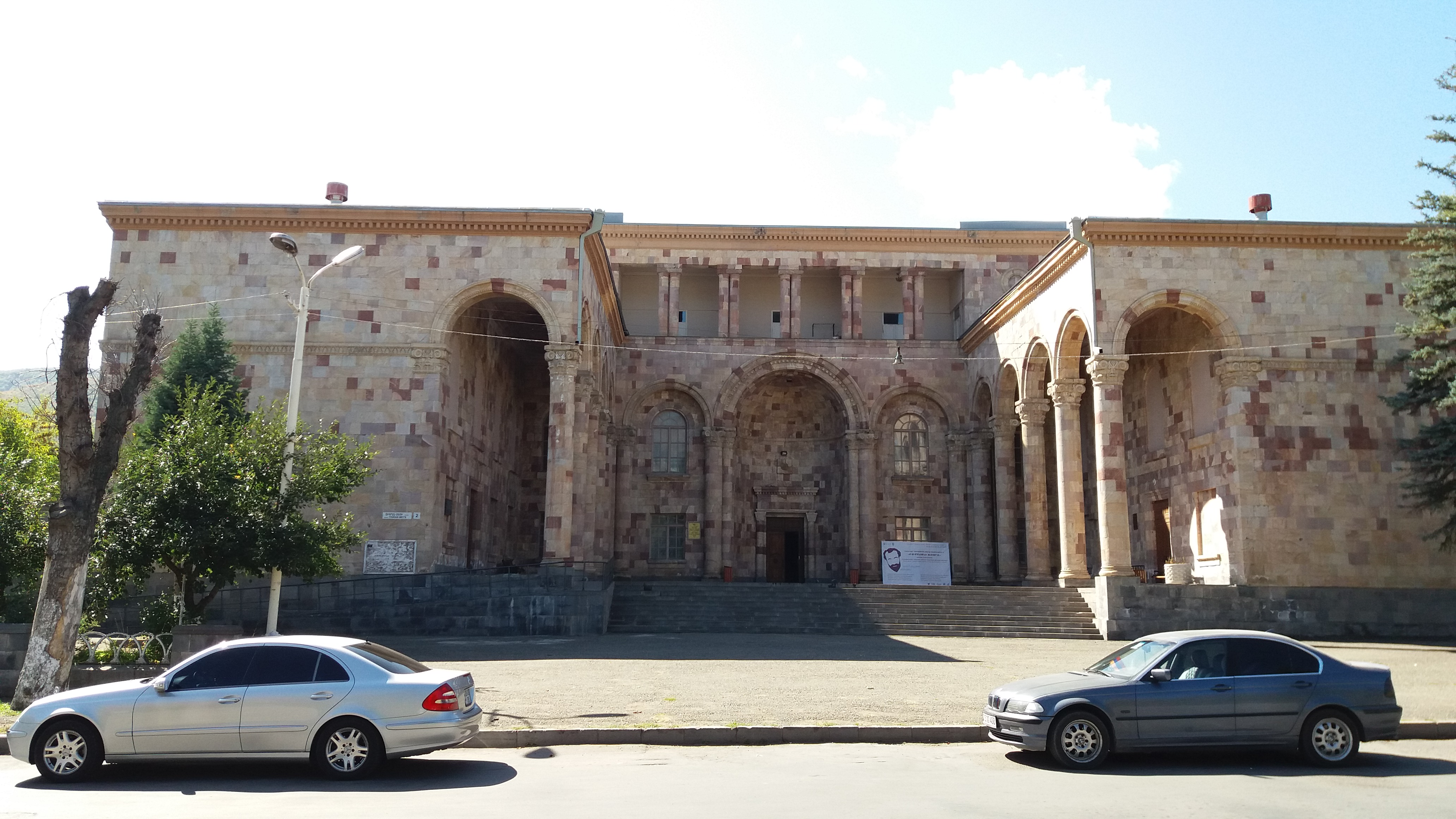
Vanadzor House of Culture named after Charles Aznavour

Vanadzor has several archaeological sites including the nearby Mashtots hill which is home to many remains from the 4th millennium BC. The Lori-Pambak archaeological museum opened in 1938 is dedicated to the history and ethnography of Gugark region. It currently has a collection of around 34,000 pieces and artifacts.

Vanadzor is the cultural center of Lori Province and northeastern Armenia. The Vanadzor House of Culture named after Charles Aznavour is one of the largest centers in Armenia. The Eduard Kzartmyan school of music is a prominent art school founded in 1934. The Vanadzor fine art museum is operating since 1974, while the house-museum of writer Stepan Zoryan is operating since 1990.

The city is home to many theatres including the Bohem Chamber Theatre of Vanadzor, Vanadzor Musical Theatre, Vanadzor Drama Theatre named after Hovhannes Abelyan, and Vanadzor Puppet Theatre. Other famous art ensembles of Vanadzor include Horevel Folke Dance Ensemble (founded in 1958), Vanadzor Chamber Music Choir (1989), and Vanadzor Chamber Orchestra (1993).

Vanadzor has also produced many famous hard rock bands including Lousnelius, Lav Eli and Vordan Karmir.

As of 2016, the city is home to 4 public libraries as well as 4 children's libraries.

== Transportation ==
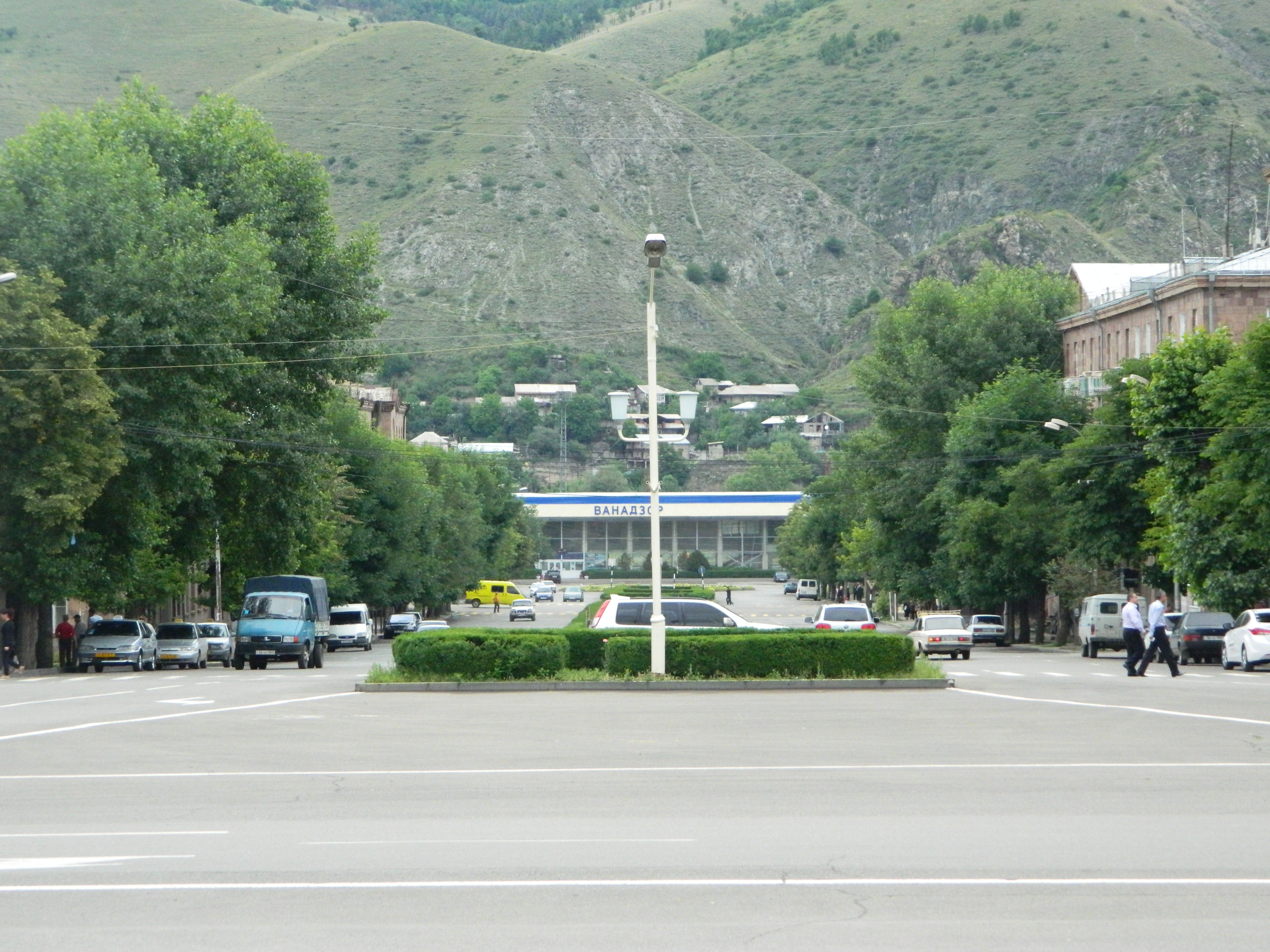
The railway station

Vanadzor is connected to other parts of Armenia through a railway and national highways. The M-6 highway that connects the M-3 towards Yerevan with the Georgian border at Bagratashen passes through Vanadzor. The city is also connected with Tavush Province to the east via the M-8 highway.

Vanadzor has a railway station with a South Caucasus Railway service that connects the city with Yerevan via Gyumri, and Tbilisi via Ayrum. In April 2012, a replacement bridge over the Zamarlu gorge just west of Vahagnadzor was opened in order to secure the safe ongoing use of the line to Ayrum. A new railway link between Vanadzor and Fioletovo (west of Dilijan) has also been proposed.

Stepanavan Airport, located 44 km (27 mi) north of Vanadzor, is the nearest airport to the city.

== Economy ==
=== Industry ===
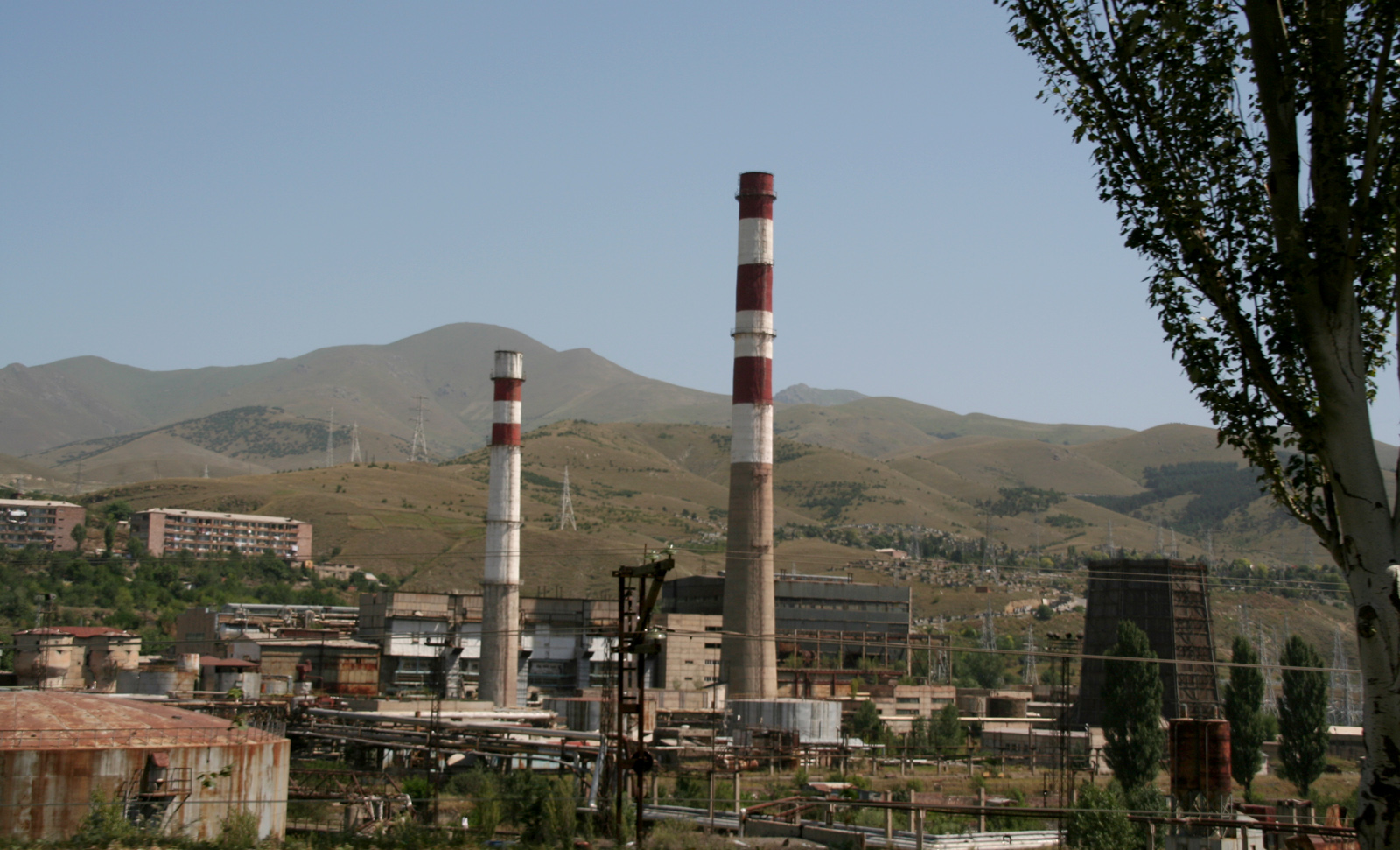
Chemical industry in Vanadzor

The city of Vanadzor is the main industrial centre of the province. The industry of the city is quite diversified with many firms specialized in garment manufacturing, chemical products, building materials, and dairy products. The largest garment manufacturers of the city are the "Dav-Gar" garment factory founded in 1962, the Darbbag's Sewing Factory founded in 1977 (privatized in 1996), the "Sarton" Sewing Factory founded in 1990, "Ruz-Dan" garment factory founded in 2000. The largest chemical plants of Vanadzor include the "Vanadzor ChimProm" founded in 1929, the "Gipk" enterprise for polymeric materials founded in 1967, and the "Gary Group" for polymeric materials founded in 1998. The "Beton" enterprise founded in 1988, the "Bionik" plant founded in 2004, and the "Karaberd" plant are specialized in building materials. The "DIET LLC", the "K&K" factory, and the "Katnagorts" plant are specialized in dairy products. Other major industrial plants of Vanadzor include the "Ardvin" electromechanical plant founded in 1956, the "Gems De Luxe" precious stone processing enterprise founded in 1996, and the "Jerutsogh" factory for heating equipments.

Many small plants for the production of building materials, mainly tufa, basalt and clay are also operating in Vanadzor.

The city is home to the Vanadzor Thermal Power Plant opened in 1961.

=== Tourism ===
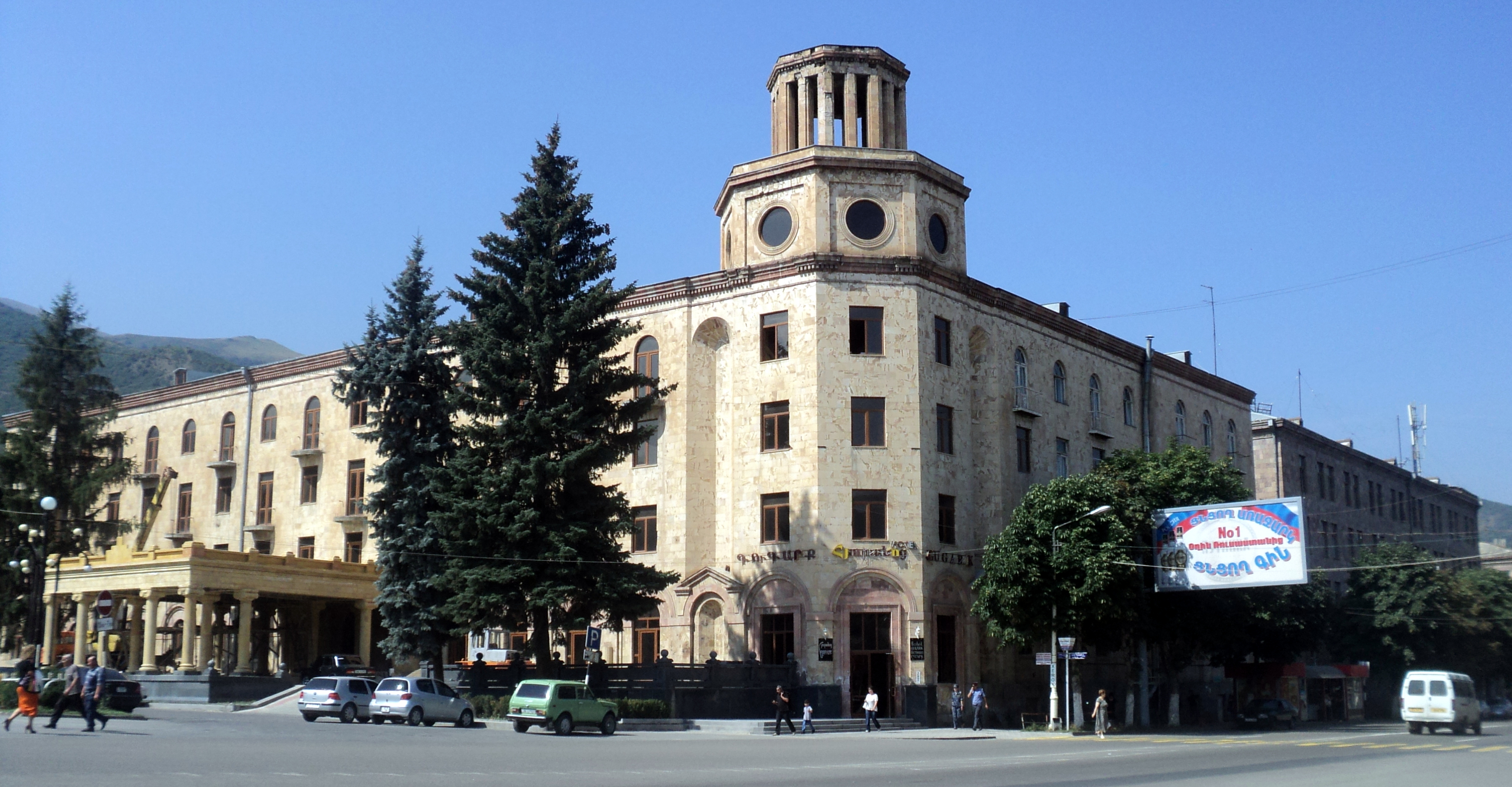
Gugark Hotel

Vanadzor is a resort center in northern Armenia due to its mild climate, clean air and mineral springs. Many hotels and spa resorts are built in the city and the nearby countryside.

The city is connected with other major cities of Armenia with a railway and a motorway.

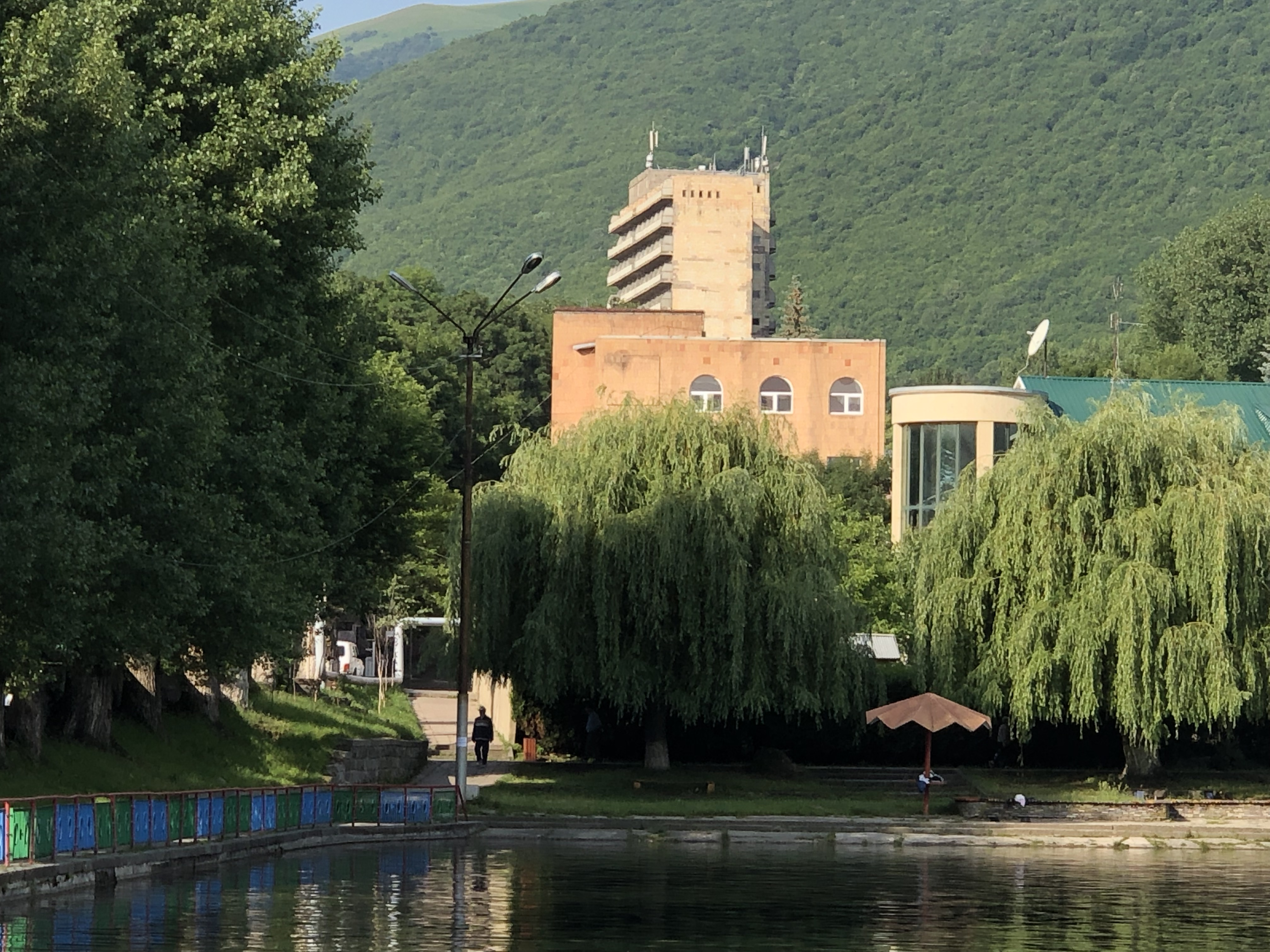

Vanadzor Armenia Health Resort & Hotel is among the most significant resorts with water treatment procedures (mineral water "Lori") and mud/peat treatment.

== Education ==
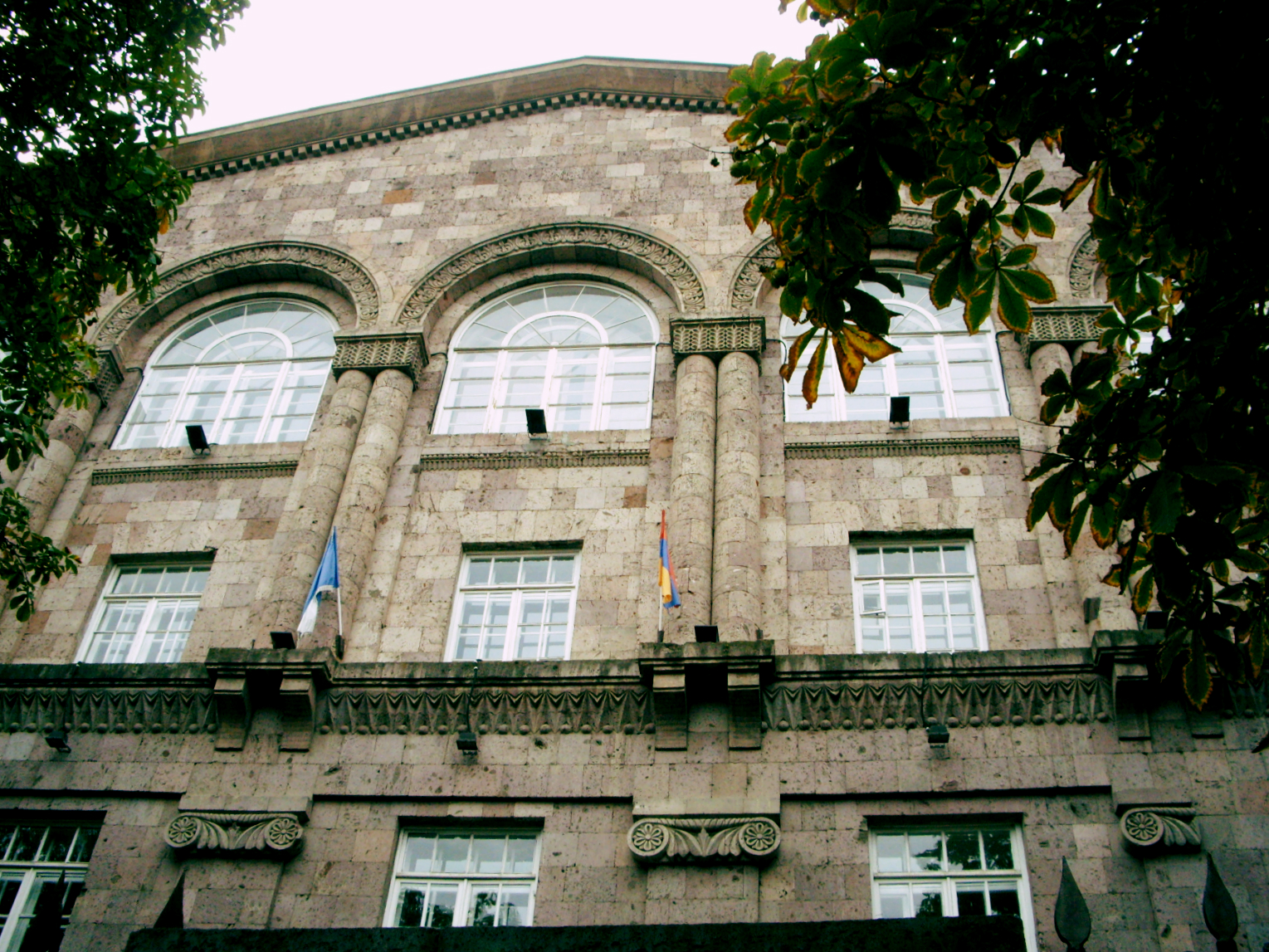
Vanadzor State University

Vanadzor is home to many educational institutions serving the population of the city and the residents of Lori and Tavush provinces.

The following educational institutions are currently operating in the city:

- Vanadzor State University named after Hovhannes Tumanyan opened in 1969, with 5 faculties:
  - Faculty of Philology,
  - Faculty of History and Geography,
  - Faculty of Pedagogy,
  - Faculty of Biology and Chemistry,
  - Faculty of Physics and Mathematics.
- Vanadzor campus of the National Polytechnic University of Armenia named after Petros Melkonyan, operating since 1959, including 2 faculties:
  - Faculty of Technologies and Sectoral economics,
  - Faculty of Natural sciences and Communication systems.
- Vanadzor campus of the Armenian National Agrarian University, operating since 2004.
- Mkhitar Gosh Armenian-Russian International University opened in 1995, currently home to 5 faculties, including: Law, Management, Foreign languages, Pedagogy, and Medicine.

On 29 October 2016, the Vanadzor Technology Center was opened in the city in an attempt to promote the business and technology environment in the entire region.

As of 2009, 6 technical intermediate colleges, 30 public education schools and 20 nurseries are operating in the city.

== Sport ==
=== Football ===
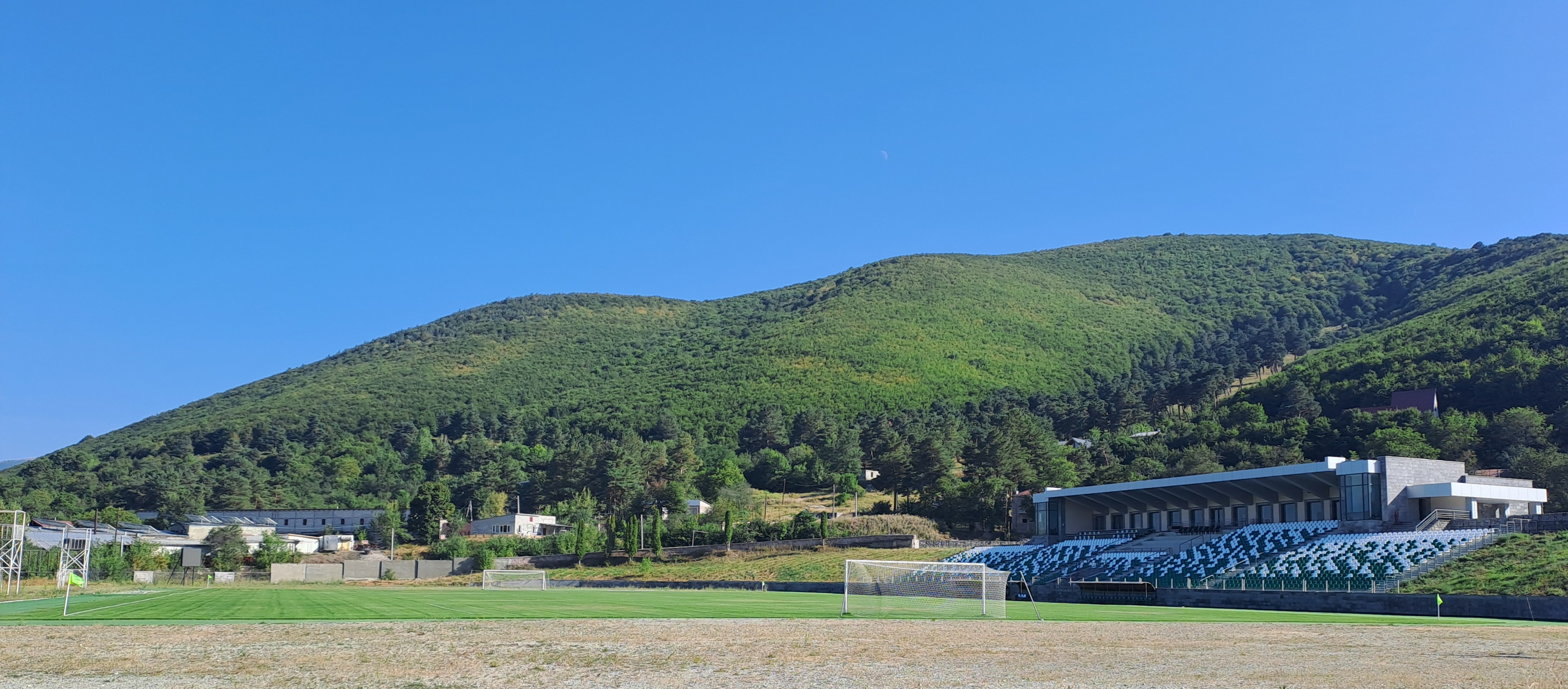
Vanadzor City Stadium

Football is popular in Vanadzor. The currently defunct football club Lori Vanadzor founded in 1936, was one of the oldest football clubs in Armenia. After the independence of Armenia, the team represented the city in domestic competitions until 2006 when was dissolved due to financial difficulties.

The largest sport venue in the city is the Vanadzor City Stadium with a capacity of 5,000 spectators. It is mainly used for football matches. A renovation plan was scheduled in order to redevelop the stadium to meet the requirements of the UEFA.

The FFA Vanadzor Football Academy opened its doors on 29 October 2016. It is home to 3 natural grass and 1 artificial turf regular-sized pitches.

In 2017, a new football club named Lori was founded by Tovmas Grigoryan; a native businessman of Vanadzor. The club made its debut at professional football through the 2017–18 Armenian First League competition.

=== Other sports ===
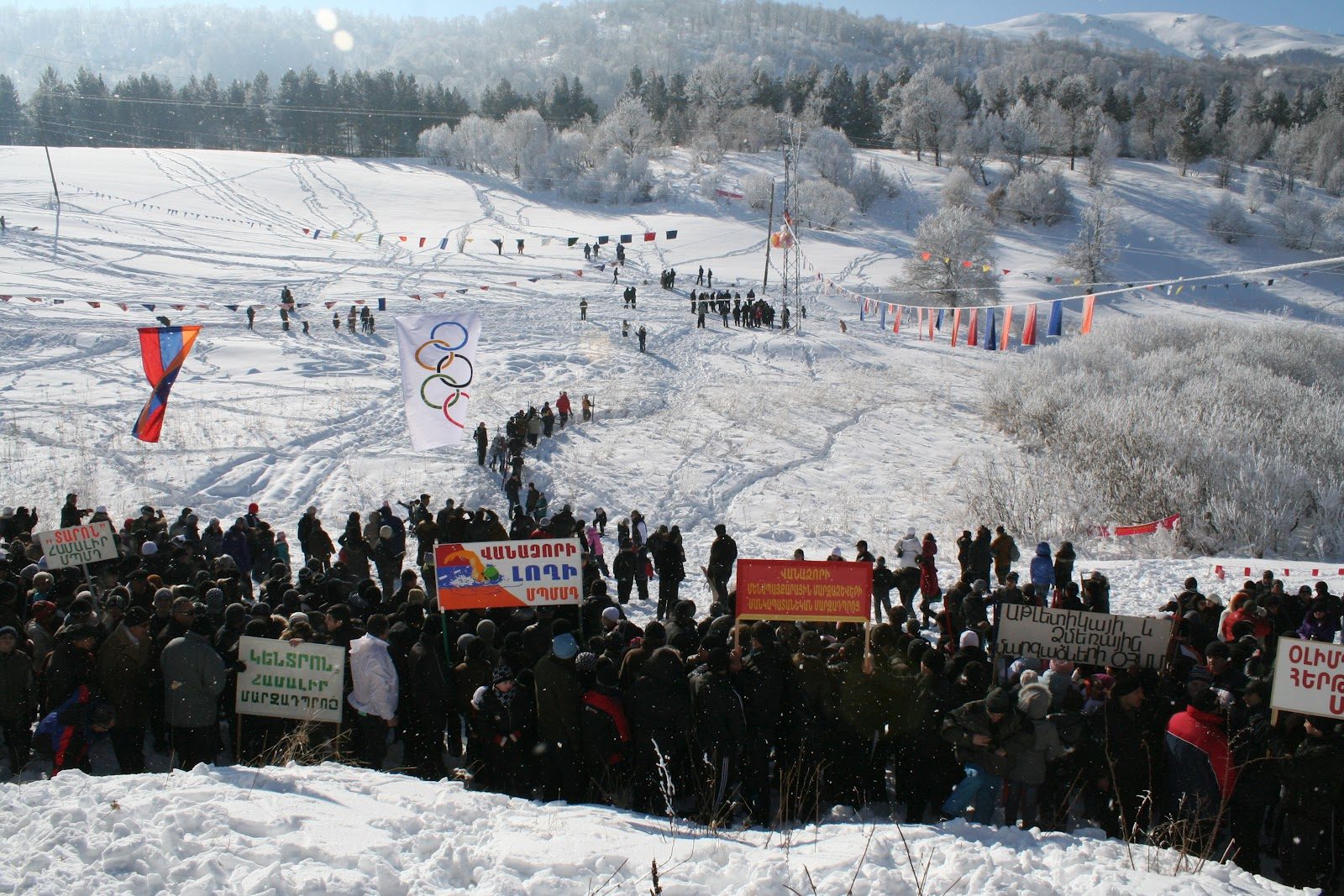
Vanadzor ski resort

Futsal is among the popular team sports in the city. The VSU futsal team plays at the Armenian Futsal Premier League. The Armenia Sports Arena of Vanadzor is the home venue of the team.

Handball and volleyball are also popular in Vanadzor. Many sport schools operate in the city under the supervision of the municipality, including the schools of swimming, athletics, weightlifting, chess, artistic gymnastics, table tennis and badminton.

Winter sports are also practiced in Lori Province. A ski resort near Vanadzor operates during the snowy season, generally extending between December and March.

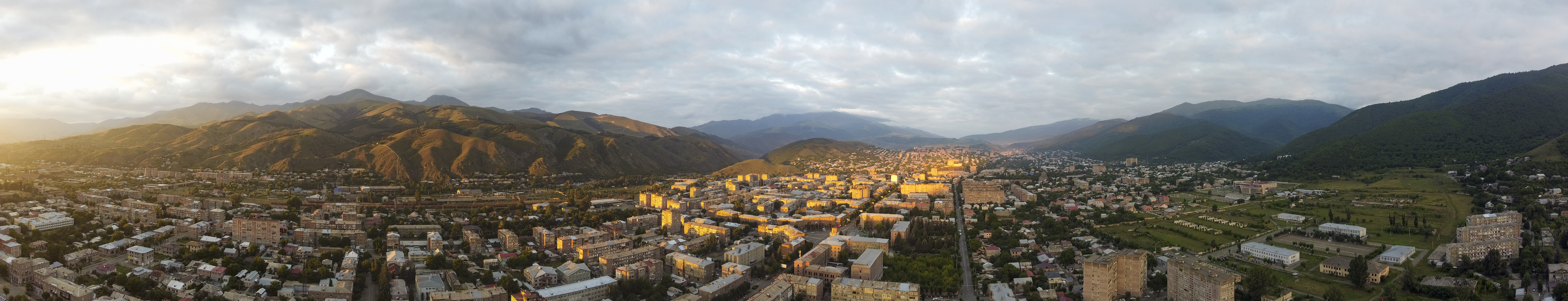
A panorama of Vanadzor city.

== Twin towns – sister cities ==
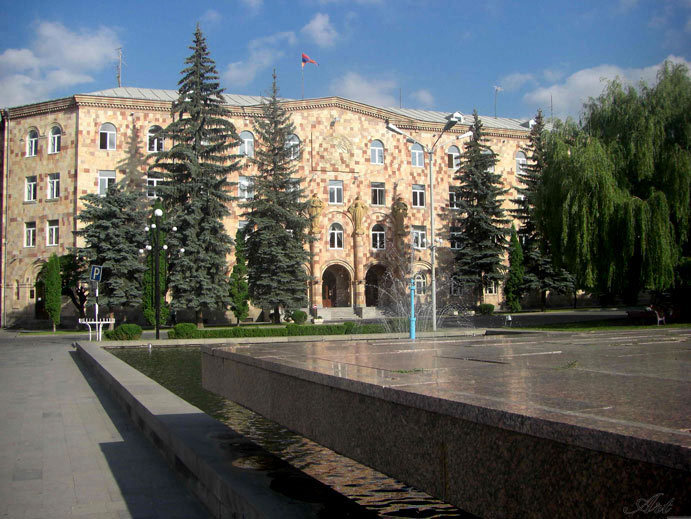
Vanadzor city hall

Vanadzor is twinned with:

- Bagneux, France (1967)
- (Georgia (country)) Batumi, Georgia (2006)
- Kislovodsk, Russia (2005)
- Pasadena, United States (1992)
- Maardu, Estonia (2007)
- Podolsk, Russia (2004)
- Vitebsk, Belarus (2012)
- Zhuzhou, China (2001)

== Notable people ==
- Tereza Mirzoyan, sculptor
- Lernik Papyan, boxer
- Stepan Zoryan, Armenian writer
- Suren Aghababyan, literary critic and Doctor of Philology
- Albert Azaryan, Olympic Champion gymnast
- Artavazd Peleshyan, film director
- Shavarsh Karapetyan, Soviet-Armenian fin swimmer
- Eduard Nalbandyan, former minister of foreign affairs
- Sergei Alifirenko, Olympic champion pistol shooter
- Tigran Sargsyan, former Prime Minister of Armenia
- Stepan Sarkisyan, freestyle wrestling Olympic silver-medalist
- Armen Gyulbudaghyants, football manager
- Gor Mkhitarian, rock-musician and singer
- Vic Darchinyan, professional boxer and world champion
- Roman Mitichyan, Armenian-American MMA fighter
- Nareh Arghamanyan, award-winning Armenian pianist
- Hrachik Javakhyan, Olympic bronze medalist and European champion in boxing
- Zhirayr Hovhannisyan. professional weightlifter
- Stepan Rostomyan, composer
- Rosa Linn, singer, songwriter and record producer
- Samvel Ter-Sahakyan, chess grandmaster
- Liana Aghabekian, Woman International Master in chess
- Samson Khachatryan, boxer
- Arman Darchinyan, Olympic boxer
- Arsen Sargsyan, long jumper.
- Edgar Gevorgyan, Olympic Weightlifter
- Vage Shakhverdyan, stage director and politician

== Bibliography ==
- Հայաստանի Հանրապետության բնակավայրերի բառարան [Republic of Armenia Settlements Dictionary] (PDF) (in Armenian). Yerevan: Cadastre Committee of the Republic of Armenia. 2008. Archived from the original (PDF) on 11 March 2018.
- Everett-Heath, John (2005). The Concise Dictionary of World Place-Names. Oxford: Oxford University Press. ISBN 978-0198605379.
- Hakobyan, T. Kh.; Melik-Bakhshyan, St. T.; Barseghyan, H. Kh., eds. (1991). "Kirovakan". Հայաստանի եւ հարակից շրջանների տեղանունների բառարան [Dictionary of Toponymy of Armenian and Adjacent Territories] (in Armenian). Vol. 3. Yerevan State University.
- Shakarian, Pietro A. (2025). Anastas Mikoyan: An Armenian Reformer in Khrushchev's Kremlin. Bloomington: Indiana University Press. ISBN 978-0253073556.
- Stelmashchuk, Nikolay Petrovich, ed. (1916). Кавказский календарь на 1917 год [Caucasian Calendar for 1917] (in Russian) (72nd ed.). Tiflis: Tipografiya kantselyarii Ye.I.V. na Kavkaze, kazenny dom.
- Walker, Christopher (1980). Armenia: The Survival of a Nation. New York: St. Martin's Press. ISBN 0-7099-0210-7.
