= Vanadzor State University =

University in Armenia

Vanadzor State University named after Hovhannes Tumanyan
- Վանաձորի Հովհաննես Թումանյանի անվան Պետական Համալսարան
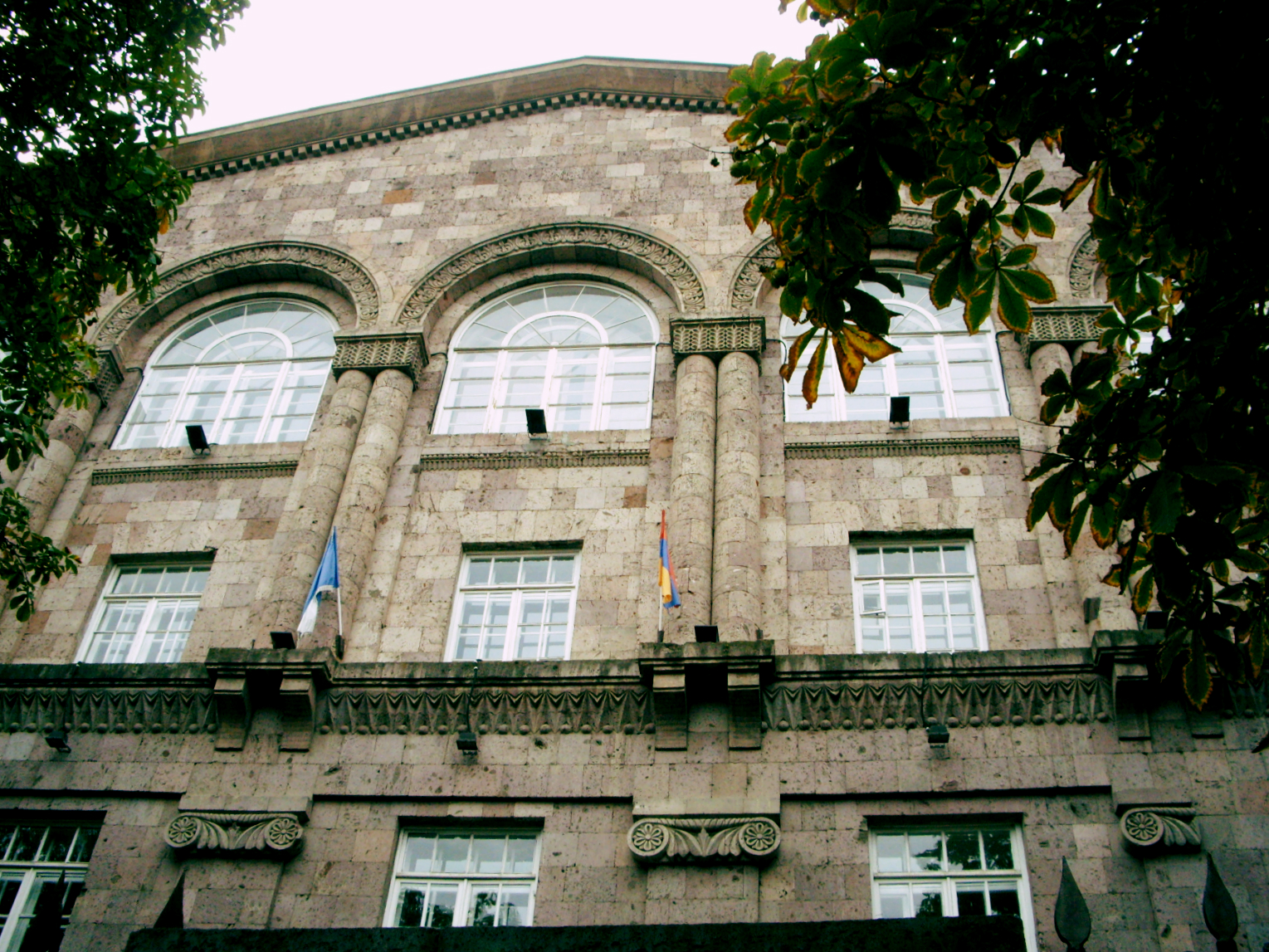
- The main building of the university
- Former name: Vanadzor State Pedagogical Institute
- Type: Public
- Established: 1969; 57 years ago
- Rector: Dr. Professor Rustam Sahakyan
- Location: Vanadzor, Lori, Armenia; 40°48′32″N 44°29′27″E
- Campus: Urban
- Website: VSU (English)
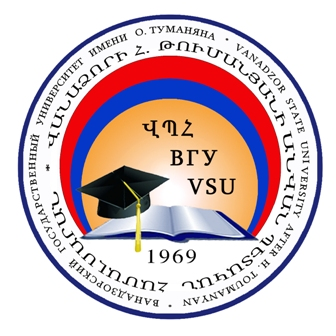

Vanadzor State University named after Hovhannes Tumanyan (VSU) (Armenian: Վանաձորի Հովհաննես Թումանյանի անվան Պետական Համալսարան), is a public university in Vanadzor, Lori Province, Armenia. With 5 faculties, it is the largest university in the Lori Province. It provides degrees in Philology, History and Geography, Pedagogy, Biology and Chemistry, and Physics and Mathematics. Currently, more than 2,400 students are attending the university.

== Overview ==
Originally, the Faculty of Pedagogy in Vanadzor was founded on 9 July 1969 as part of the Armenian State Pedagogical University. In 1982, the Faculty of Physics and Mathematics of the Yerevan State University-Vanadzor branch was opened.

On 30 April 2014, by the decision of the Government of Armenia, the educational institutions of Vanadzor were restructured to form the Vanadzor State University named after Hovhannes Tumanyan.

The current rector of the university is Rustam Sahakyan.

== Faculties ==
Currently, the university has the following structure:

- Faculty of Philology
  - Section of Armenian Language
  - Section of Literature
  - Section of Russian Language
  - Section of Foreign Languages
- Faculty of History and Geography
  - Section of History
  - Section of Philosophy and Political Science
  - Section of the Theory of Economics
- Faculty of Pedagogy
  - Section of Pedagogy
  - Section of Psychology and Sociology
  - Section of Art
- Faculty of Biology and Chemistry
  - Section of Biology, Physiology and Medical Science
  - Section of Chemistry
  - Section of PE Theory and Methodology
- Faculty of Physics and Mathematics
  - Section of Physics
  - Section of Mathematics and Methodology
  - Section of IT and Economical Methods and Modeling

== Notable alumni ==
- Tovmas Poghosyan (1954-), prominent Armenia folk music performer.
