= Church of the Holy Mother of God, Vanadzor =

Church in Lori, Armenia

Coordinates: 40°48′53.5″N 44°29′44.5″E

Church of the Holy Mother of God
- Սուրբ Աստվածածին եկեղեցի
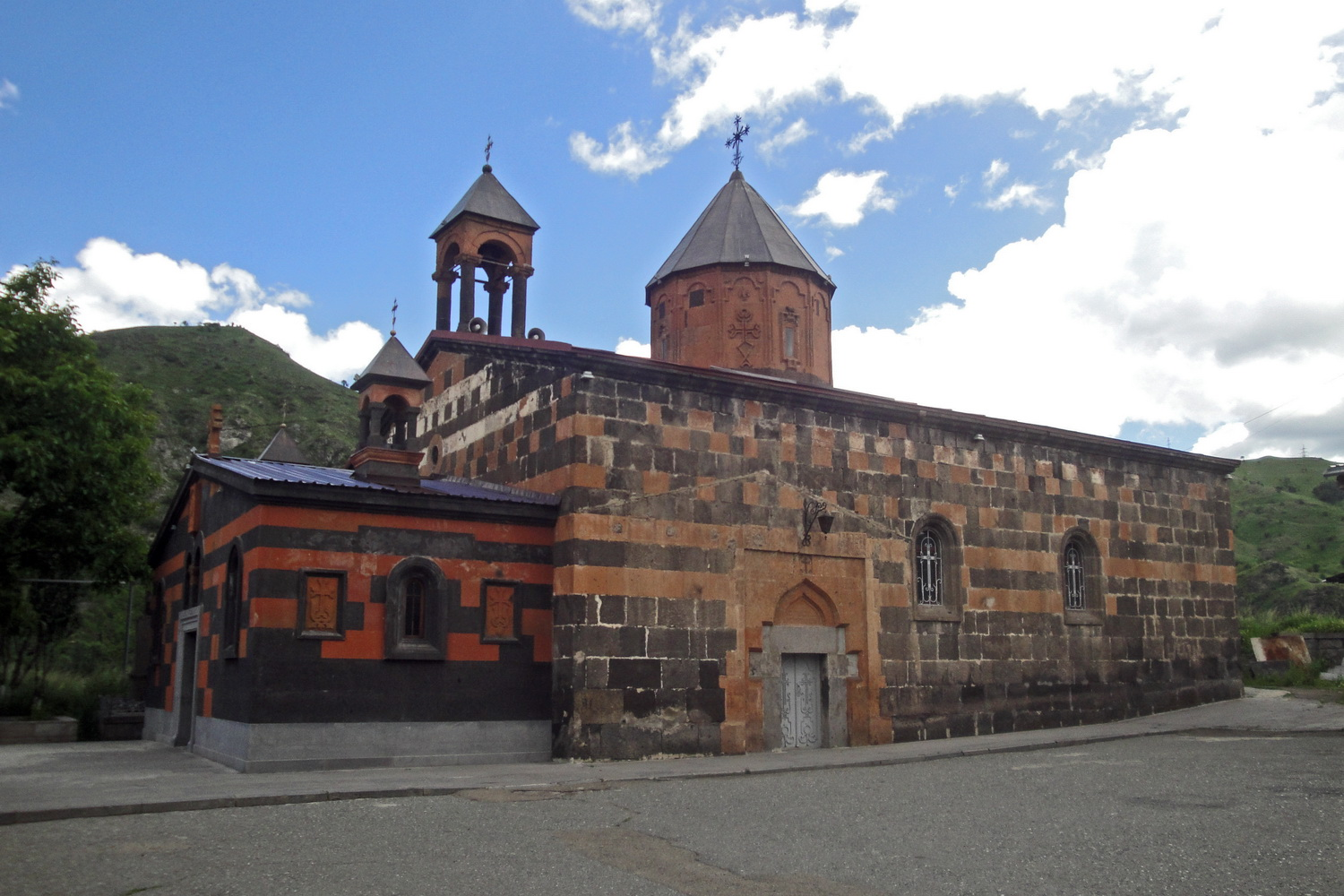
- Church of the Holy Mother of God

- Location within Armenia

Religion
- Affiliation: Armenian Apostolic Church
- Leadership: Diocese of Gougark
- Year consecrated: 1831

Location
- Location: Vanadzor, Lori Province, Armenia

Architecture
- Type: Armenian
- Style: Single-nave domed basilica
- Groundbreaking: 1828
- Completed: 1830
- Dome: 1

Church of the Holy Mother of God (Armenian: Սուրբ Աստվածածին եկեղեցի) is a 19th-century church in Vanadzor, Armenia. It was constructed between 1828 and 1830 and consecrated in 1831. The construction was completed through the donation of Yuzbashi (captain) Piluman Tayiryants, during the reign of tsar Nicholas I of Russia and Catholicos John VIII of Armenia.

== History ==
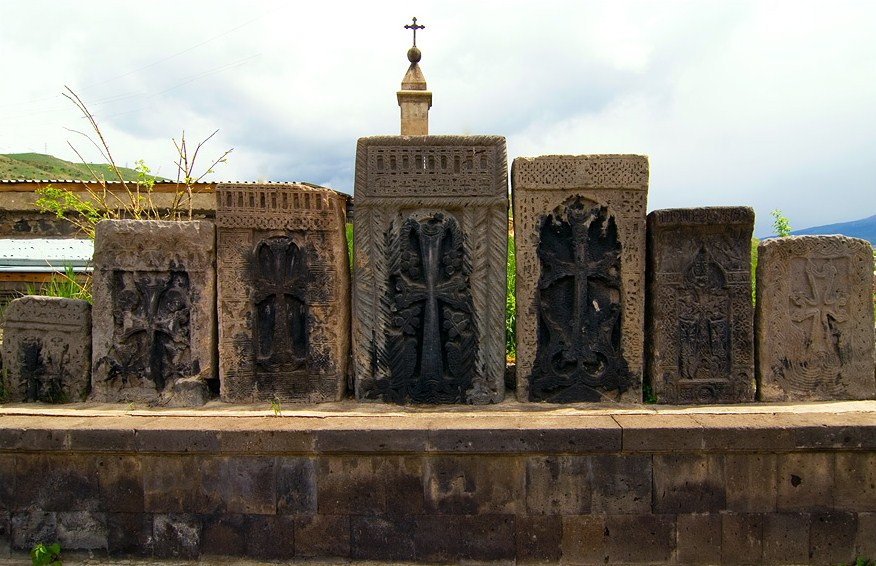
13th-century khachkars near the church

As early as the 13th century, the area of modern-day Vanadzor was called Gharakilisa -meaning the black church in Turkic- by the Seljuks possibly. This name was derived from the black-stoned ancient Armenian church of the Holy Mother of God, probably built in the 13th century during the rule of the Zakarid princes of Armenia.

However, the current building of the church was built between 1828 and 1830 to replace the ancient church ruined during the 1826 Gharakilisa earthquake.

The new church was built with orange and black colored tufa stones brought from Gyumri. It represents a single-nave domed basilica. In 1853, a school was opened in the churchyard.

The church was completely renovated in 1900 by the Tayiryants family.

Holy Mother of God of Vanadzor was among the few churches in Armenia that continued to operate as a place of worship during the Soviet rule. In 1966, the belfry of the church was added at its entrance.

Khachkars (cross-stones) dating back to the 13th century are found in the churchyard.

The latest renovation at the church took place in 1999.
