= Vanadzor Technology Center =

- Type: Public–private
- Established: 2016
- Affiliations: Ministry of Economy of Armenia, Enterprise Incubator Foundation, World Bank.
- Director: Bagrat Yengibaryan
- Location: Vanadzor, Lori Province, Armenia; 40°47′50″N 44°31′17″E
- Website: vtc.am

Vanadzor Technology Center (Armenian: Վանաձորի տեխնոլոգիական կենտրոն), is a technological center for IT development in Vanadzor, the third-largest city in Armenia. It was opened on 29 October 2016. Founded by the Enterprise Incubator Foundation with the support of Government of Armenia and the World Bank, the project aims to promote the business and technology environment in Lori Province and the entire region of north Armenia.

== Mission ==
The mission of Vanadzor Technology Center is to promote Vanadzor's role as a regional and international center for high-tech business. The ultimate goal of the centre is to contribute to the sustainable development of the region.

The center's activities include business consultancy, mentoring, marketing and promotion, introduction to funding opportunities, and establishment of business connections for increasing the competitiveness of companies in the global marketplace. The centre aims at helping enterprises in expanding activities, putting into use effective management systems, attracting investments, developing, introducing and implementing technical innovations, capturing new markets, and developing workforce skills.
