= Pamphylia Tanailidi =

Azerbaijani actress

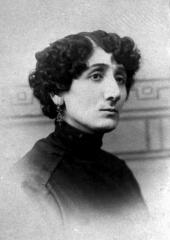
- from Azerbaijan State Theater Museum
- Born: 1891; Bashkand
- Died: October 15, 1937 (aged 45–46); Baku
- Occupation: Actress
- Notable work: Goveh the Blacksmith

Pamphylia Tanailidi, often spelled as Panfilia Tanailidi (Azerbaijani: Panfiliya Tanailidi, Greek: Παμφυλία Ταναϊλίδη; 1891, Bashkand – 15 October 1937, Baku) was an Azerbaijani actress of Pontic Greek origin.

== Life and career ==
Tanailidi was born in the village of Bashkand (then Zangezur uyezd, Elisabethpol Governorate of Russia; nowadays the village of Mutsk, Syunik province, Armenia) to a family of émigrés from Kars. She first appeared on stage in 1905 as an Azeri drama trouper in Tiflis (the troupe was reorganized into the Azerbaijani Theatre of Tbilisi in 1922), where she acted in plays by Hajibeyov, Jabbarli, Shakespeare, etc. in both Azeri and Greek languages. At that time, Tanailidi was often credited as Surayya Zangasurskaya (Azeri: Sürəyya Zəngəzurskaya). In 1917, she toured Iran along with prominent Azeri actors of the time. Playing the part of Asya in Hajibeyov's Arshin Mal Alan musical comedy in 1919 brought her great success. In 1924, she settled in Baku and started working at the Azerbaijan State Academic National Drama Theatre. Later she starred in the movies Ismat (1934) and Almaz (1936).

== Death ==
In 1937, Pamphylia Tanailidi was accused by the Soviet government of being an Iranian spy. Her close friendship with Govhar Gaziyeva (Azerbaijani actress and Tanailidi's co-trouper, who emigrated to Iran upon Azerbaijan's Sovietization in 1920) and Ahmed Trinić (an Albanian-born journalist, who was imprisoned in 1936 and committed suicide a year later) was considered enough evidence to condemn her of espionage. Tanailidi refused to plead guilty. After a fifteen-minute trial, she was given the death sentence, and on 15 October 1937 she was executed by firing squad. The location of her burial place remains unknown even today.

In 1957, Pamphylia Tanailidi was officially exonerated.

== Roles ==
- Mehriban (Goveh the Blacksmith by S. Sami)
- Badi ul-Jamal (Seyfalmuluk by M.J. Amirov)
- Azerbai (Azerbai and Jan by I. Ashurbeyli)
- Shamsa (The Tripoli War by J. Jabbarli)
- Kabla Fatma (The Dead People by J. Mammadguluzadeh)
- Emilia (Othello by W. Shakespeare)
- Peasant woman (Timur the Lame by H. Javid)
- Aouda (Around the World in Eighty Days by J. Verne)
- Wise woman (Ismat by M. Mikayilov & G. Braginski)
- Fatmanisa (Almaz by J. Jabbarli)

== Trivia ==
- Tanailidi was fluent in five languages: Pontic Greek, Azeri, Russian, Turkish, and Georgian.
- She was known as a heavy smoker. According to poet Suleyman Rustam, among many reasons that led to her arrest, there was her preference of Iranian tobacco over Soviet tobacco, which she disliked and called "garbage".
