= Getik Baghdasarian =

Armenian sculptor

- Born: 26 February 1949; Borisovka, Sisian, Syunik Province
- Known for: Sculpture
- Notable work: "The Pope's Monument" in Echmiadzin; "Hazaran Blbul" in Arzny; Zangezur Gateways; 12 bas-relief in Saint Sargis Church

Getik Baghdasarian also Baghdasaryan (Armenian: Գետիկ Հովհաննեսի Բաղդասարյան; born 26 February 1949, Sisian, Syunik Province) is an Armenian sculptor based in Yerevan. He is a nephew of architect Baghdasar Arzoumanian.

== Education and academic career ==
From 1964–68, Baghdasarian studied in the Terlemezian Fine Arts College. Then he graduated with honors from the Sculpture Department of the Fine Arts and Drama Institute (1969–1974). He has been a member of the faculty at the Yerevan Fine Arts Academy since 1975, and the head of the Sculpture Department since 1993.

In 2006, he was the winner for sculpture of the annual arts awards, instituted by the president of Armenia. The prize was a medal, diploma and 2.5 million drams. Baghdasarian's winning work was a monument erected two years previously in Sisian to the writer Hamo Sahian. One of his famous compatriots and colleagues is talented sculptor Rafik Khachatryan (1937-1993).

== Exhibitions/awards ==
Getik Baghdasaryan has participated in the following exhibitions:

- 1980 "We build Communism" exhibitions in Yerevan, Armenia and Moscow, Russia
- 1983 "The man and the Land", Moscow, Russia
- 1984 "Our Contemporary", Moscow – Czech Republic (2nd prize)
- 1984 Single Piece Exhibition, Best Work Award for “Arno Babajanyan”, Yerevan, Armenia
- 1985 Winner “A. Babajanyan”, “Paravon Mirzoyan” in USSR international contest
- 1989 Diplomat USSR Fine Arts Academy “Horse takers” and “A. Babajanyan”
- 1989 personal exhibitions at Moscow Lazarev Gymnasia
- 1991 "Sculpture 91", Yerevan, Armenia – Moscow, Russia
- 1993 13 Artist's Exhibition, Kochar museum, Yerevan, Armenia
- 1994 Winner “Paradise – Life – Hades”, Dante’ contest, Ravenna, Italy
- 1998 Exhibition-competition dedicated to Dante along with 12 Armenian sculptures, Florence (awarded with gold medal)
- 2001 Centro Dantesco, Ravenna, Italy
- 2001 exhibition dedicated to 1700 anniversary of adopting Christianity in Armenia, awarded with the prize for the best work
- 2003 “Vahagn” award in national contest for 12 reliefs in Gyumri St. Hakob Church, Armenia
- 2004 Exhibiting in “Gevorgyan Gallery”, Yerevan, Armenia
- 2005 Galerie Bel Air, Geneva, Switzerland
- 2006 Exhibition of Contemporary Art, Gevorgian Gallery, Yerevan, Armenia

== Solo exhibitions ==
- 1989 "Sculpture 81", Lazaryan gymnasium, Moscow, Russia
- 1999 Artists Union, Yerevan, Armenia
- 2004 “Albert and Tove Boyajyan” Gallery, Yerevan, Armenia

== Sculptures ==
1982 "The Pope's Monument" in Echmiadzin
1982 "Hazaran Blbul" in Arzni
1985 "Zitan" symposium in Ijevan
1986 "Hazaran Blbul" symposium in Ijevan
1987 Zangezur Gateways
1988 "Ktrich's Monument" in Sisian
1990 "Fairytale" symposium in Ijevan
1999 12 bas-relief in Saint Sargis Church, Yerevan
2001 "Sculpture of Saint Thaddeus" in Saint Gregory the Illuminator Cathedral, Yerevan

Also have works in Moscow Tretyakov Gallery, State Gallery of Ivanov city-Russia, State Gallery of Tiumen city-Russia, Yeghishe Charent's house museum in Yerevan and Charentsavan, Museum of Wood Art in Yerevan, Bergori museum in Lachin and a number of other places. His works are comprised in private collections of different countries of the world: Belgium, Poland, Hungary, Czech Republic, the US, Sudan, Italy, Denmark, China, Germany, UAE, Russia, France, Armenia and a number of other countries.

== Other awards ==
2008 Tekeyan Award for the sculpture of Yeghishe Charents.
2010 The Boghossian Prize for the statue of Nerses Ashtaraketsi in Ashtarak, Armenia.
