= Varazdat Harutyunyan =

Armenian academic, architect and writer (1909-2008)

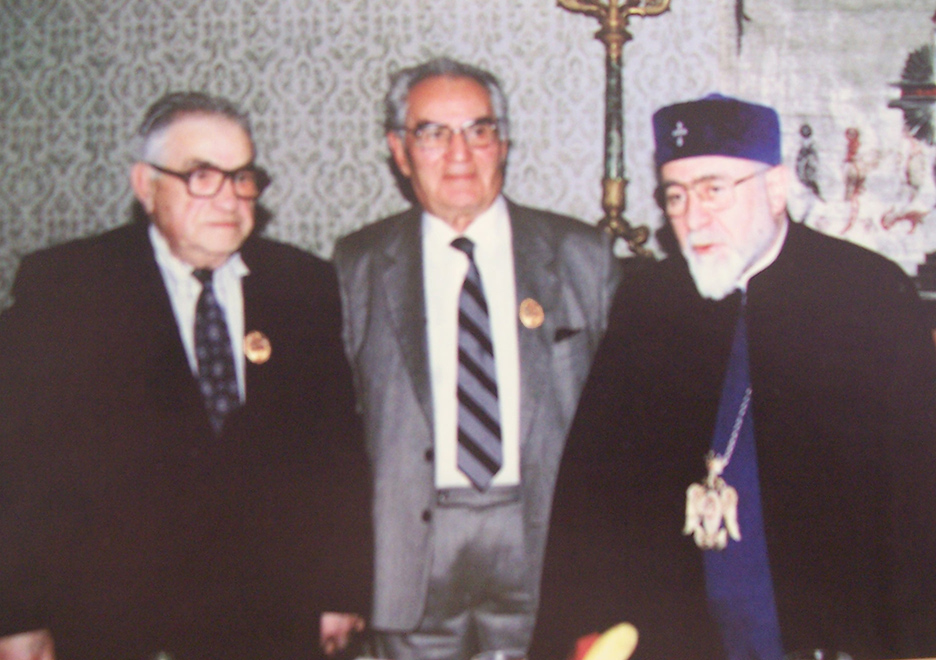
Varazdat Harutyunyan after getting St. Gregory the Illuminator Medal from Karekin I, Catholicos of All Armenians (from left: Varazdat Harutyunyan, architect Baghdasar Arzoumanian and Karekin I).

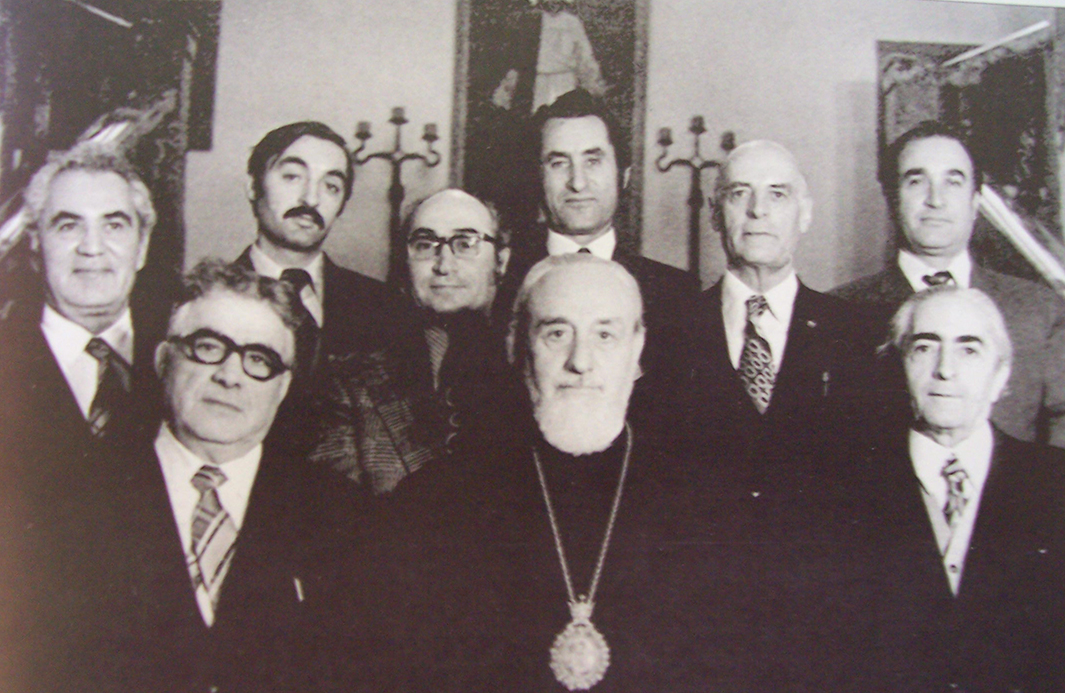
Architectural Commission of the Mother See of Holy Etchmiadzin (1970-1988). First row from left: Varazdat Harutyunyan, Catholicos Vazgen I, K. Altunyan Second row from left: B. Arzoumanian, H. Babakhanian, Grigor Khanjyan, Artsrun Galikyan, M. Hovhannisyan

Varazdat Harutyunyan (also Harutiunian, Armenian: Վարազդատ Հարությունյան; 29 November 1909 in Van – 20 March 2008 in Yerevan) was an Armenian academic, architect and writer.

== Biography ==
Harutyunyan was born in the Ottoman Empire, in the town of Van, but he and his family were forced to flee into Russian territory during the Armenian genocide. They settled first in Tbilisi and then in Yerevan. In 1946, he obtained his Ph.D., and then Doctor of Science in architecture. In 1964, he became a professor of history. In 1996 he was elected Academician of the National Academy of Sciences of Armenia. In Armenia, he was also president of the Society for Protection of Historical Monuments.

He was the author of over 40 books and over 800 articles, mostly on Armenian architecture.
