= St. Sarkis Church (Yerevan, Armenia) =

Armenian Church in Yerevan, Armenia

Saint Sarkis Church Սուրբ Սարգիս Եկեղեցի
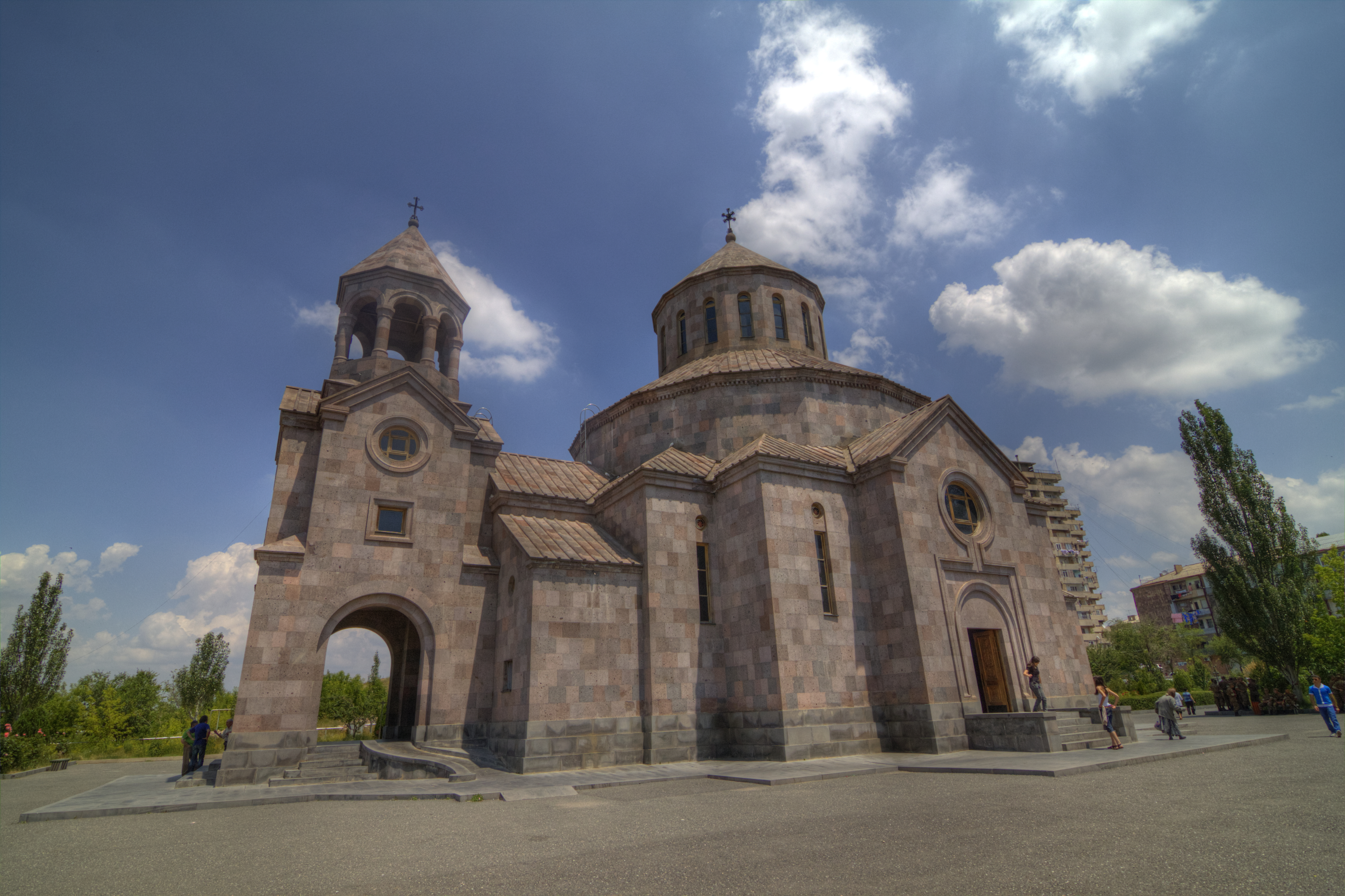

- Location within Armenia

Religion
- Affiliation: Armenian Apostolic Church
- Year consecrated: 1999

Location
- Location: Galshoyan Street, Nor Nork, Yerevan, Armenia
- Coordinates: 40.181396°N 44.565188°E

Architecture
- Architect: Baghdasar Arzoumanian
- Style: Armenian
- Groundbreaking: 1998

Saint Sarkis Church (Armenian: Սուրբ Սարգիս Եկեղեցի, Surp Sarkis Yekeghetsi) or Saint Sarkis Church is an Armenian Apostolic Church in the Nor Nork district of Yerevan, Armenia. The construction of the church began in 1998 and was sponsored by Sarkis Gabrellian, an Armenian benefactor from New York City.

The church was built according to the design of the architect Baghdasar Arzoumanian. The painting of the Mother-of-God with the Christ child for the altar is by the painter Grigor Khanjyan. The newly erected St. Sarkis Church, with its architectural value, brings respect and honour to the authors of the project, to the builder-masters and to the Mother Church. Its circular form, polygonal and three-storeyed structure has been executed according to the traditional Armenian architectural style.

The height of the main dome is 23 metre. The prayer-hall is polygonal and bright, with a general area of 328 square metre. The chief altar is seen clearly from every corner. The pillars of the prayer-hall have the symbolic high reliefs of the 12 apostles. Niches are designed for candle-lighting. Special fans are placed above them to protect the walls of the church from smoke. The St. Sarkis is the first church in Armenia which is heated by the heating system under the marble floor.

== Gallery ==
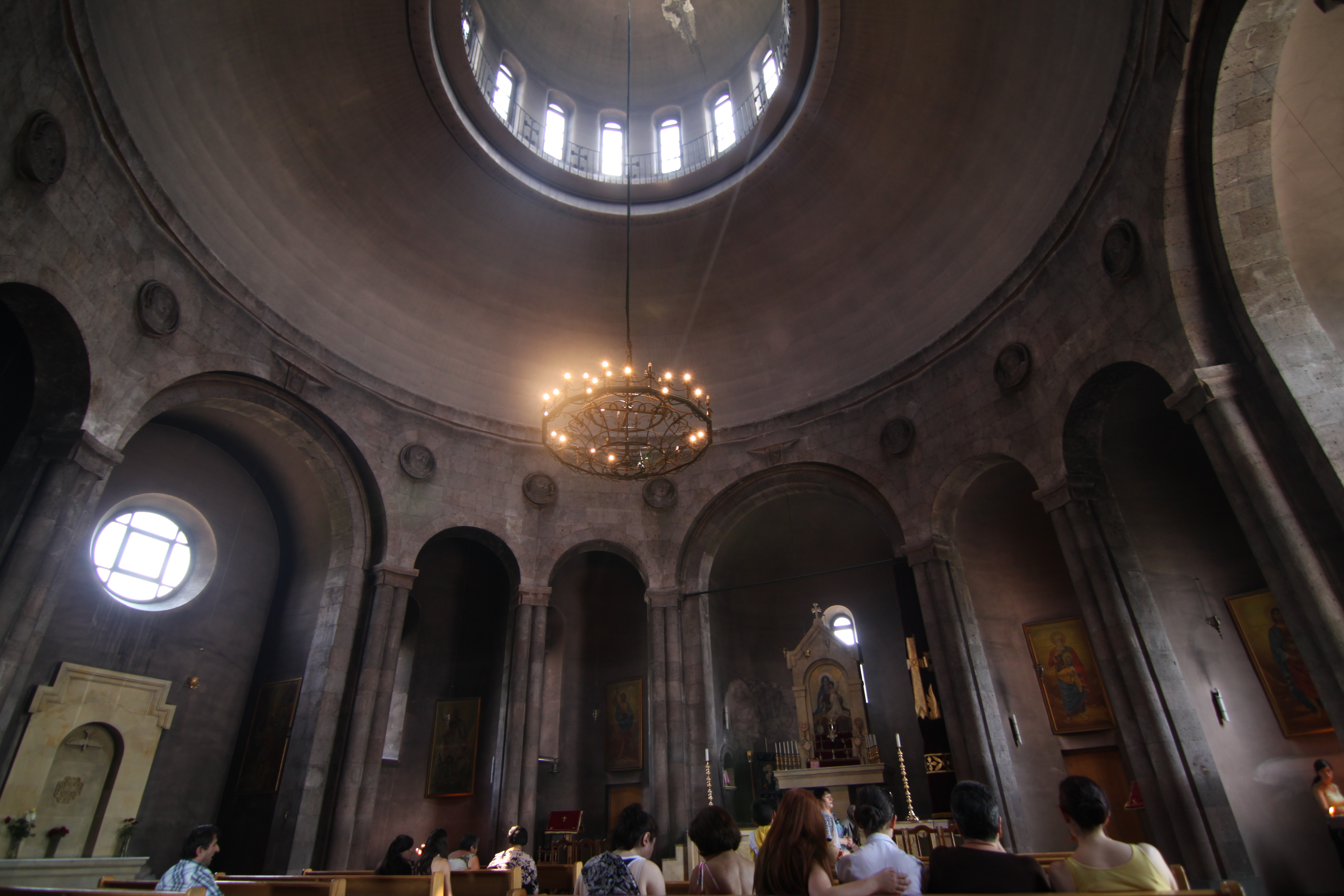
View of the dome and altar

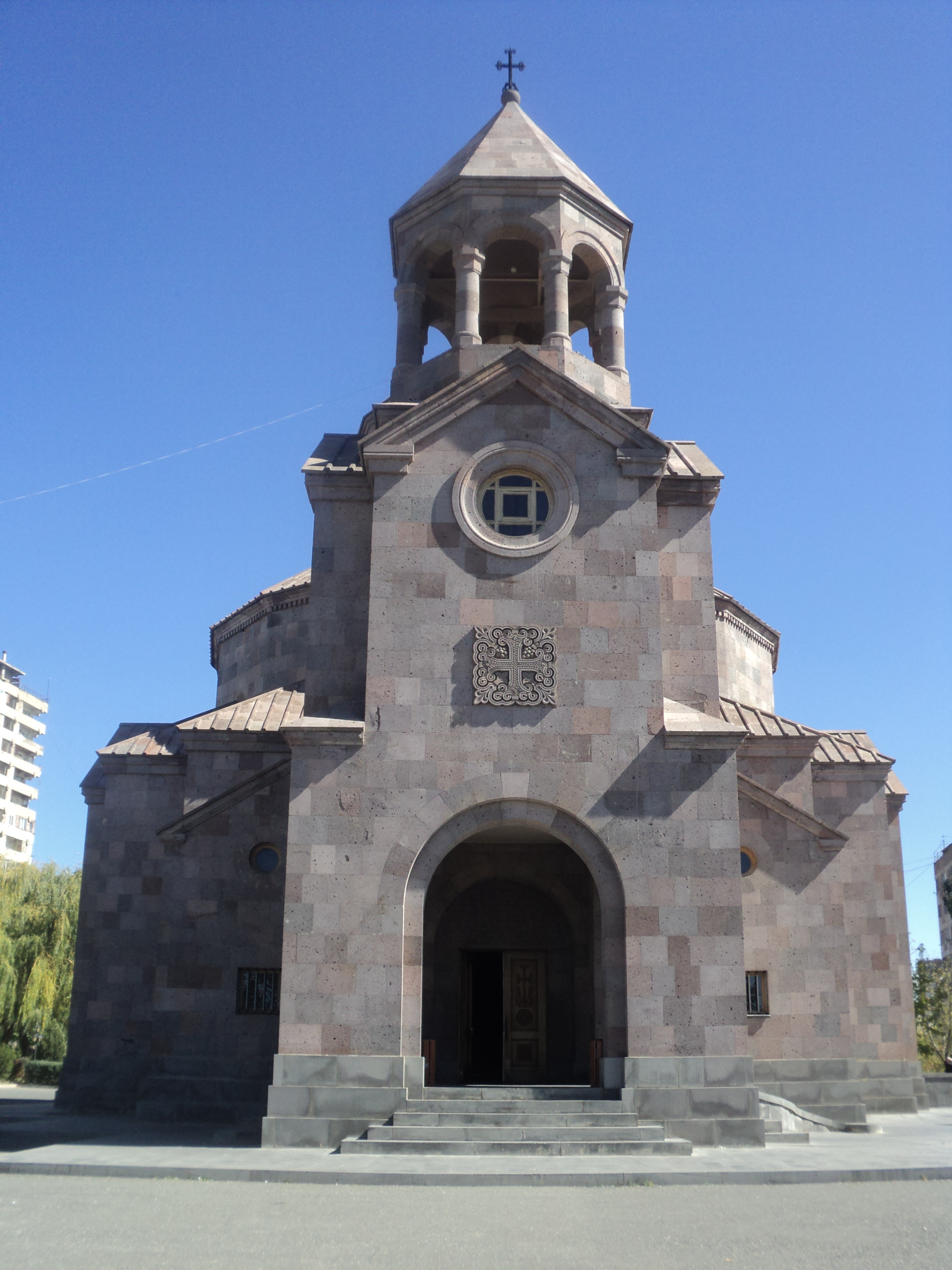
The facade

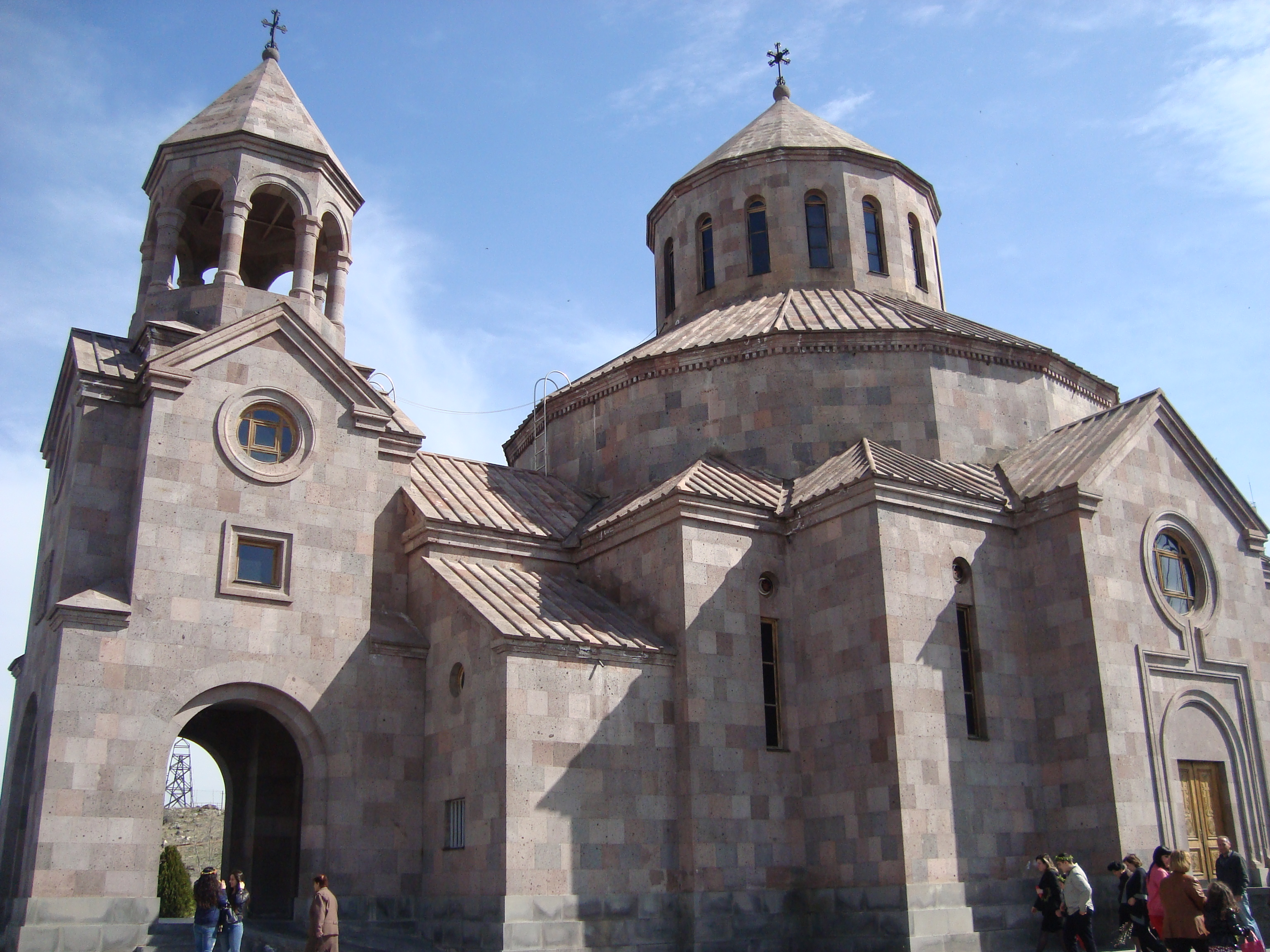

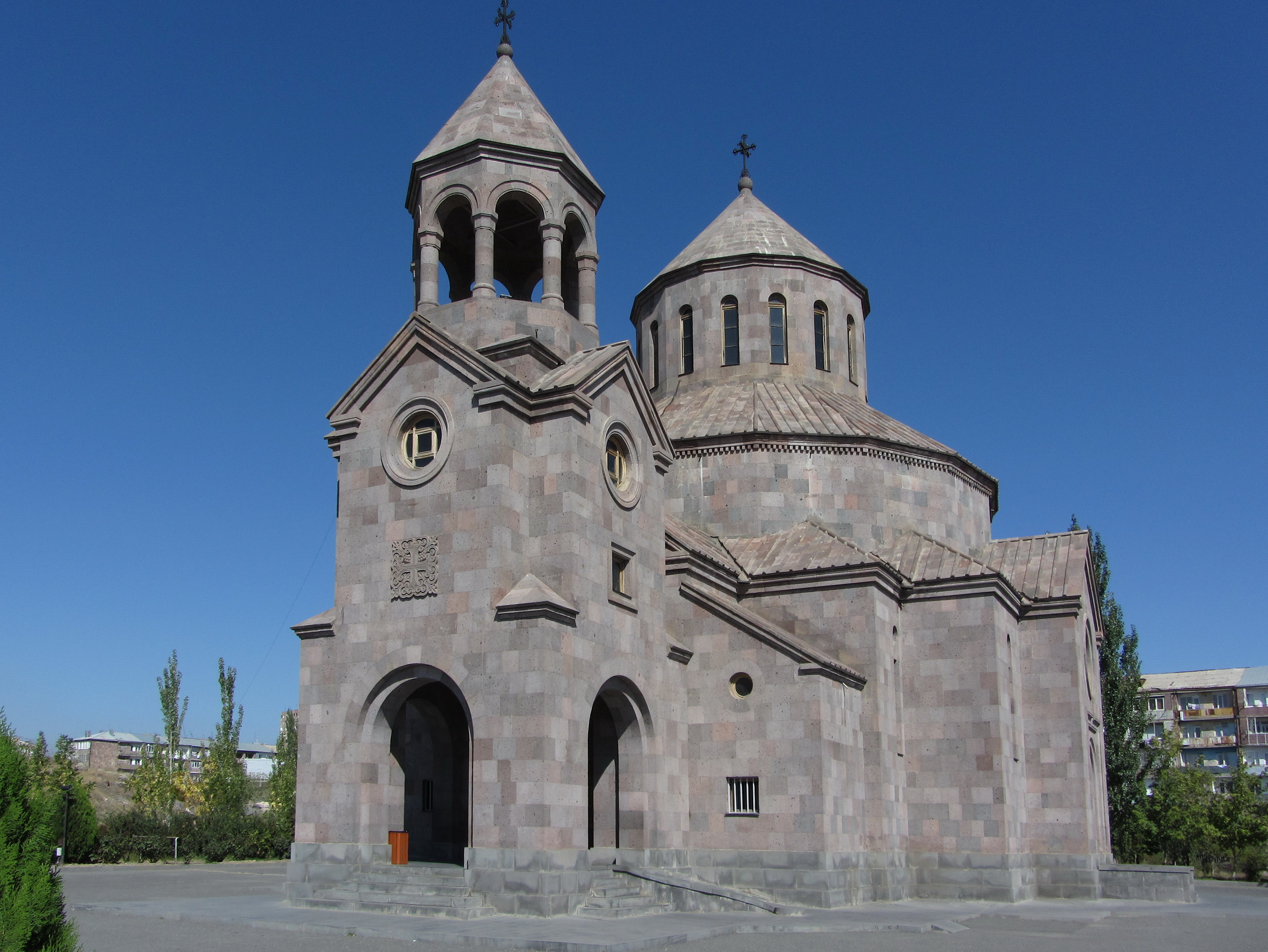

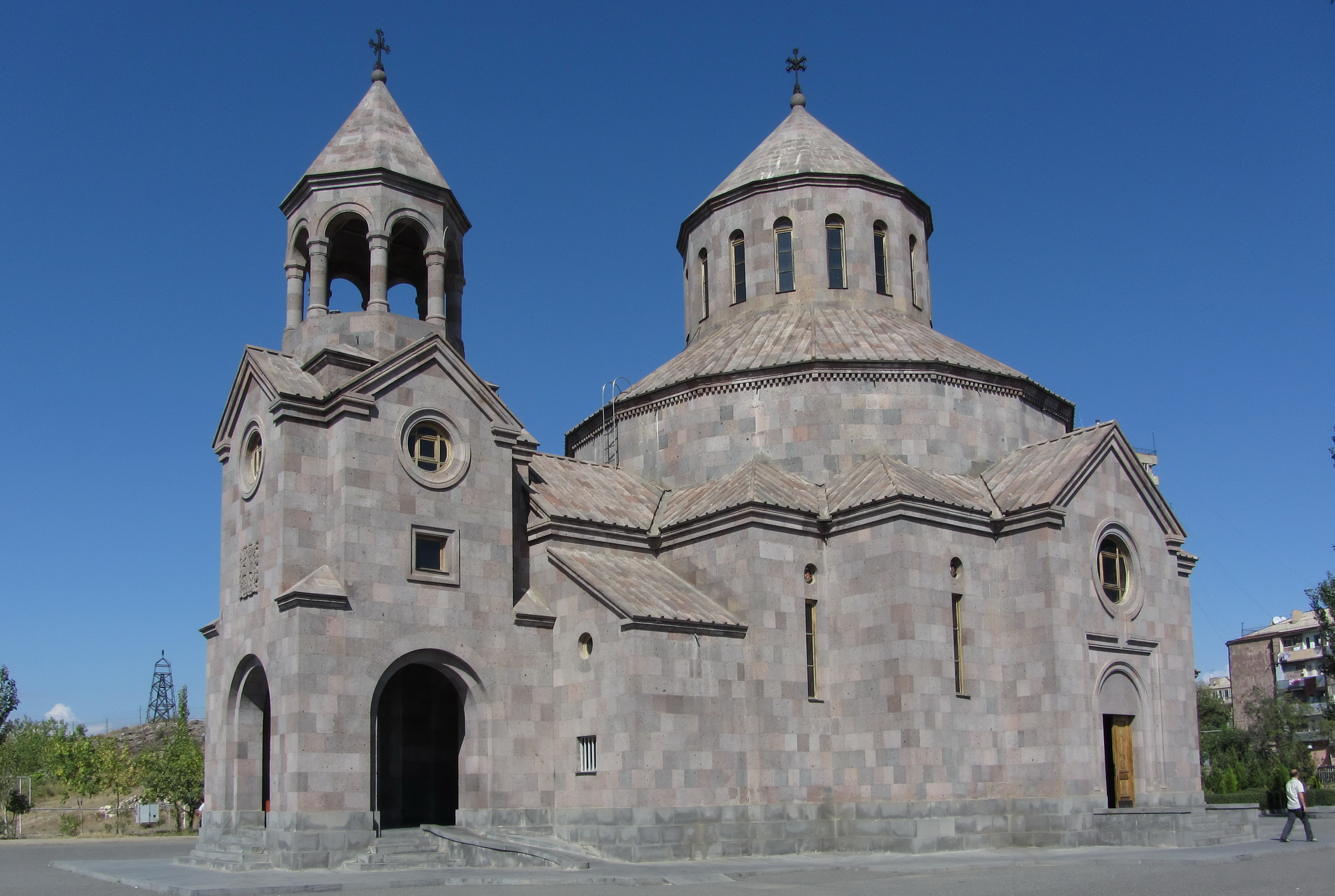

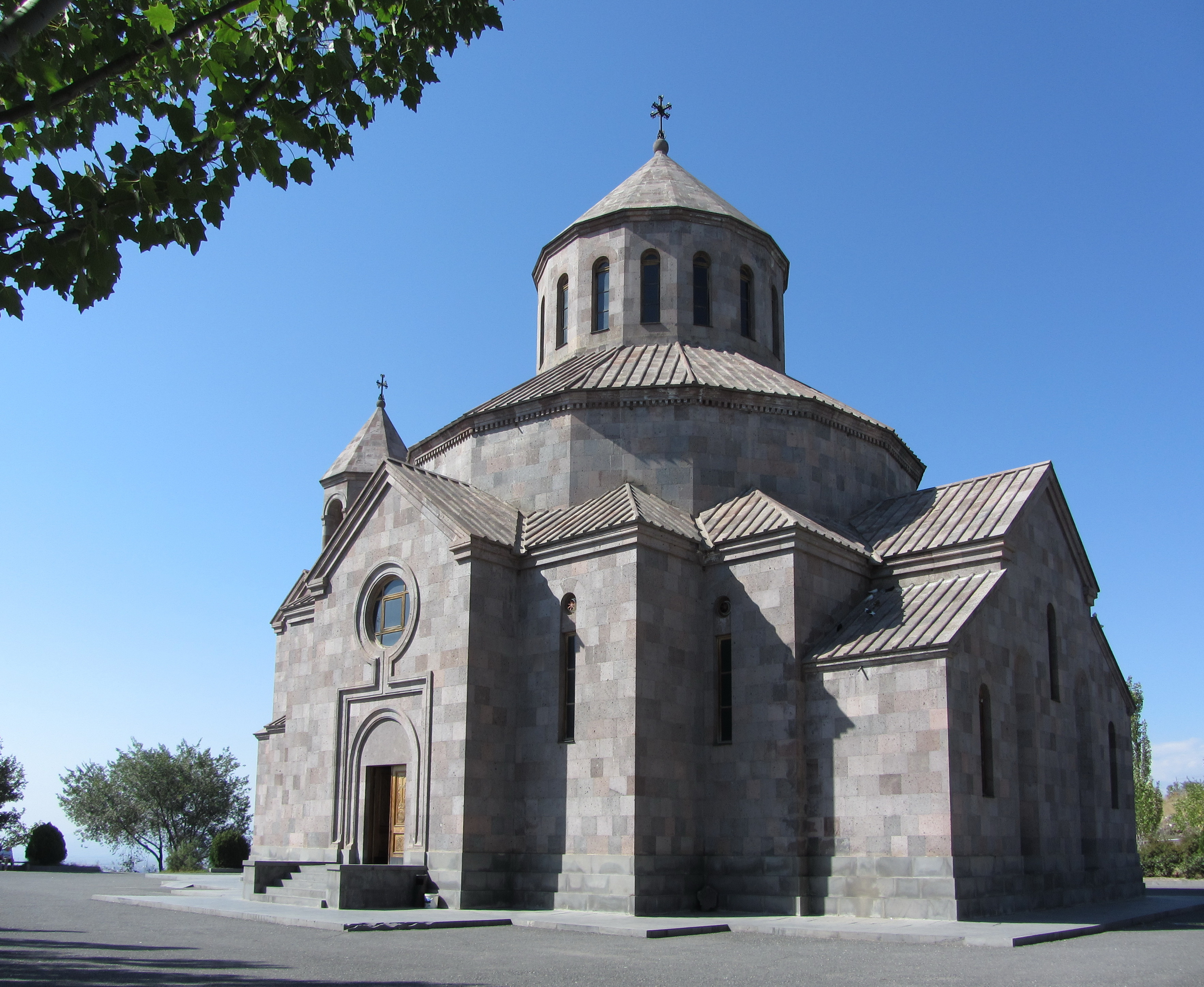

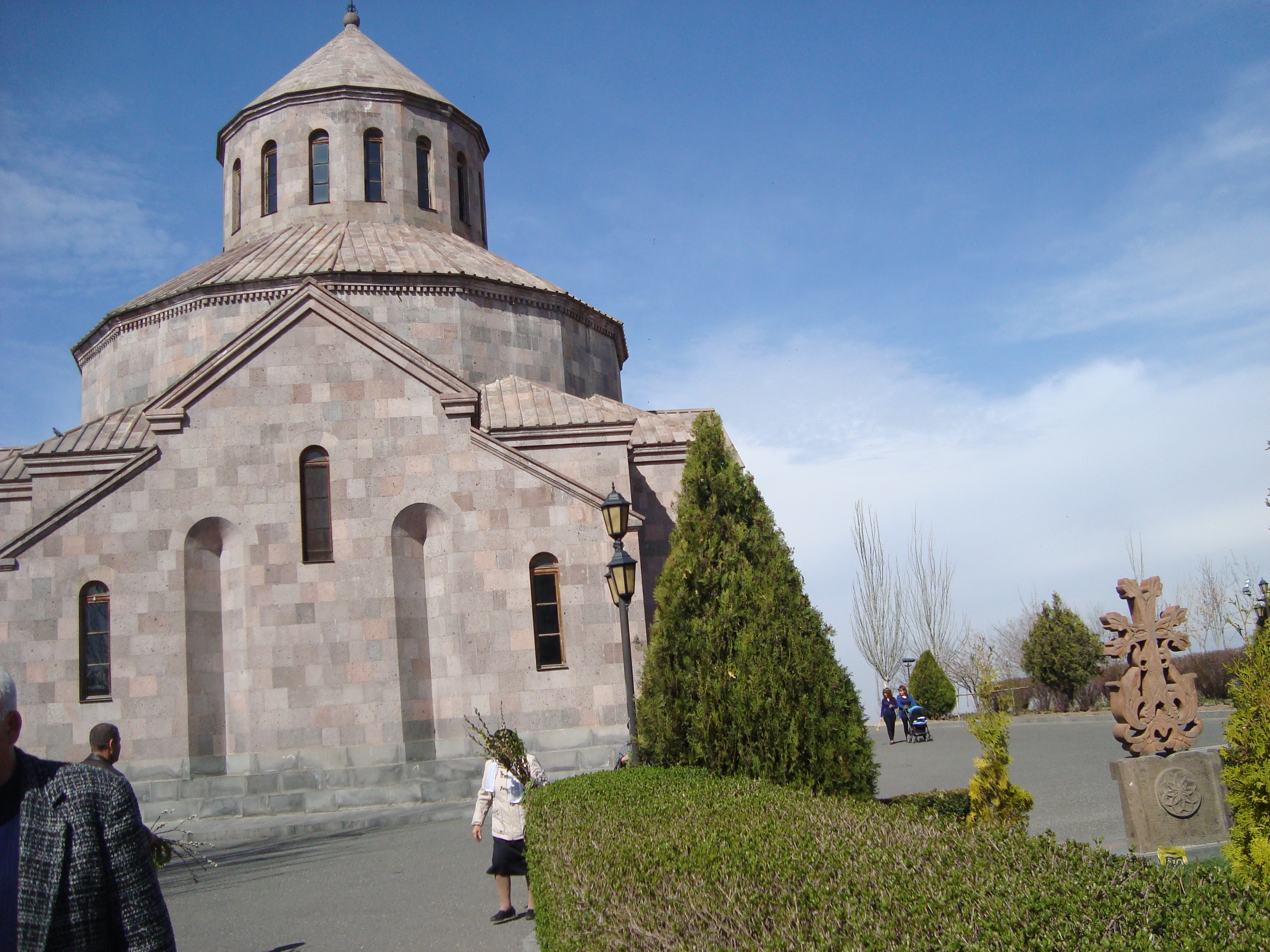

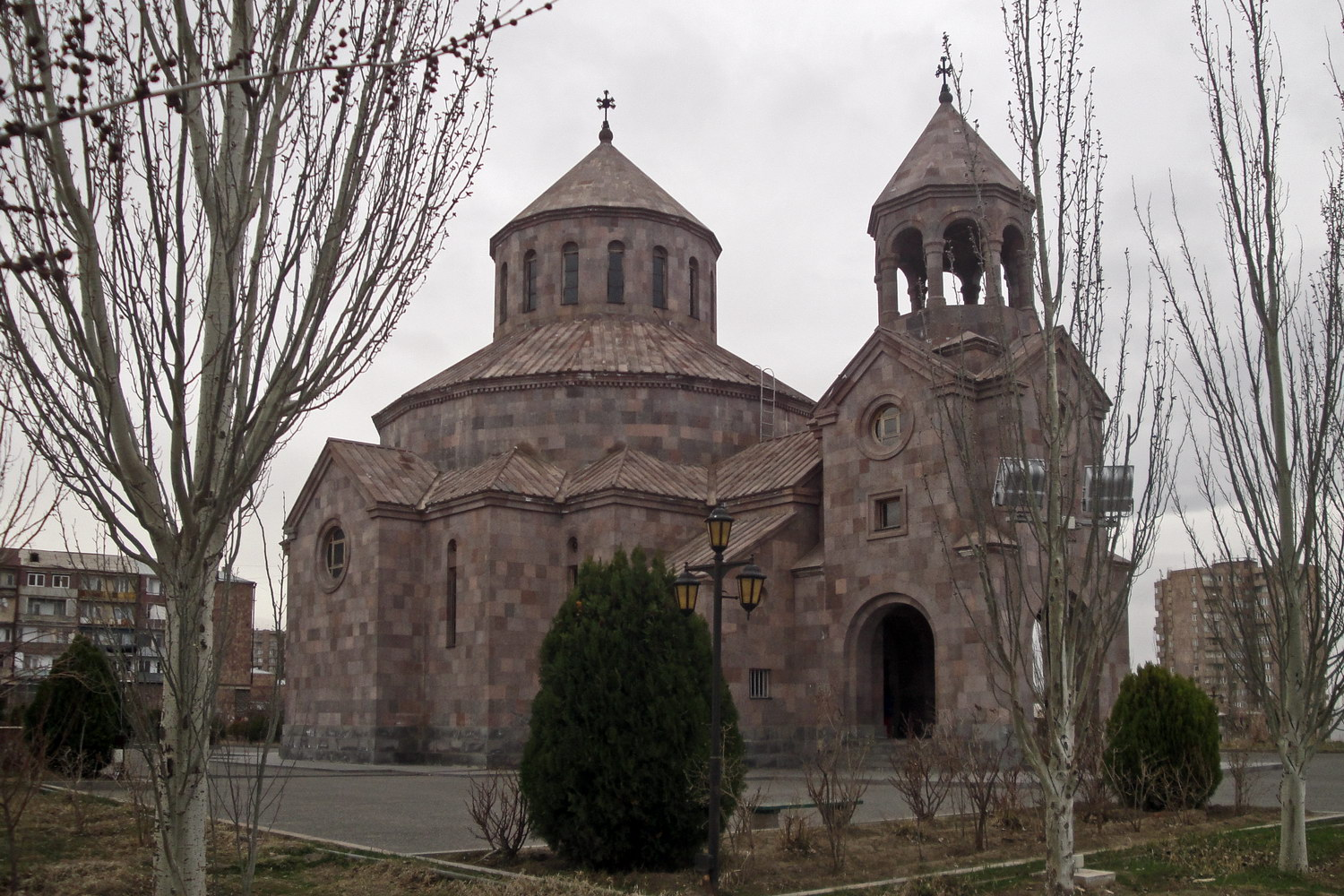

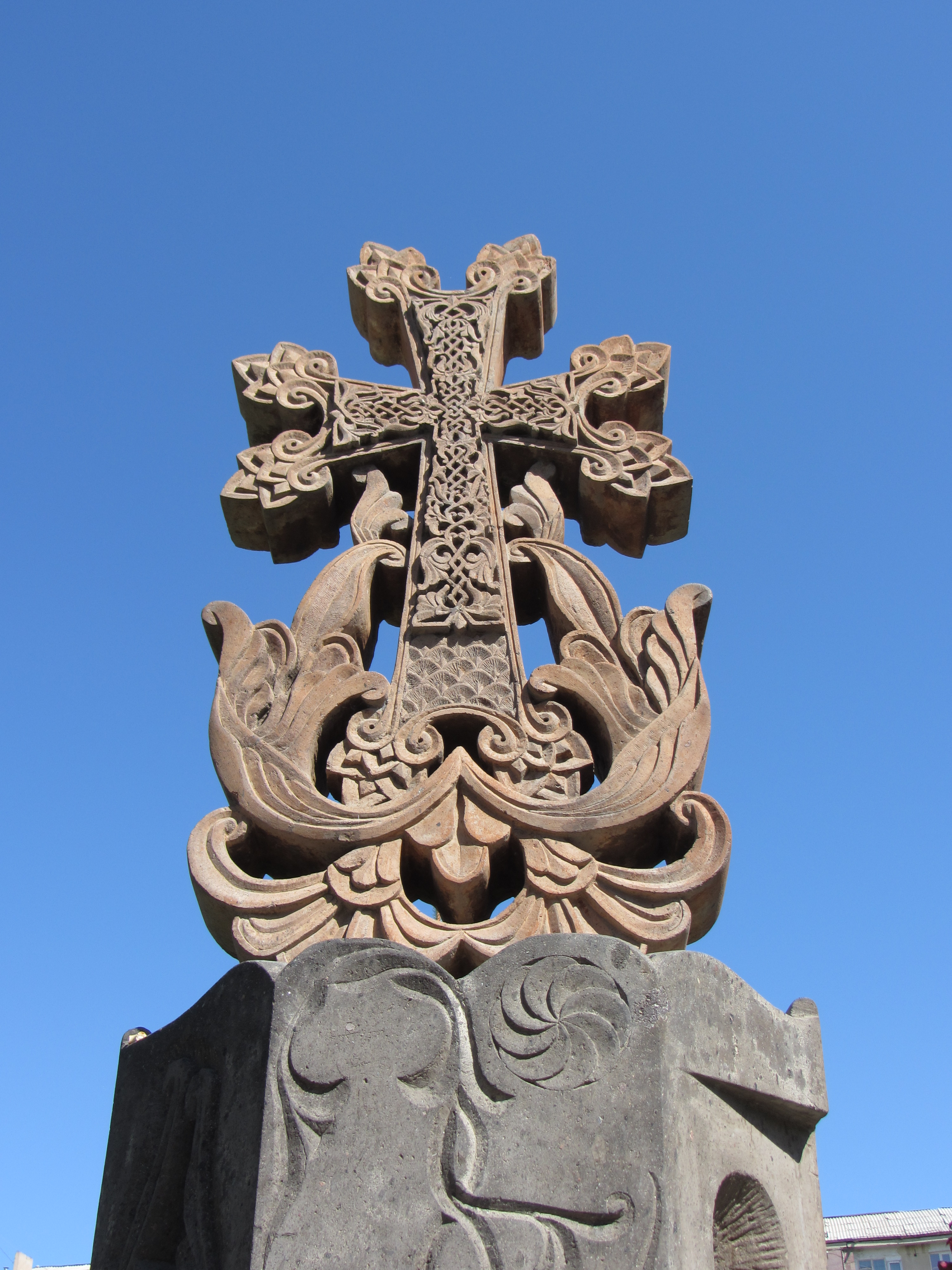
