= Holy Trinity Church, Yerevan =

Church in Yerevan, Armenia

Holy Trinity Church Սուրբ Երրորդություն Եկեղեցի
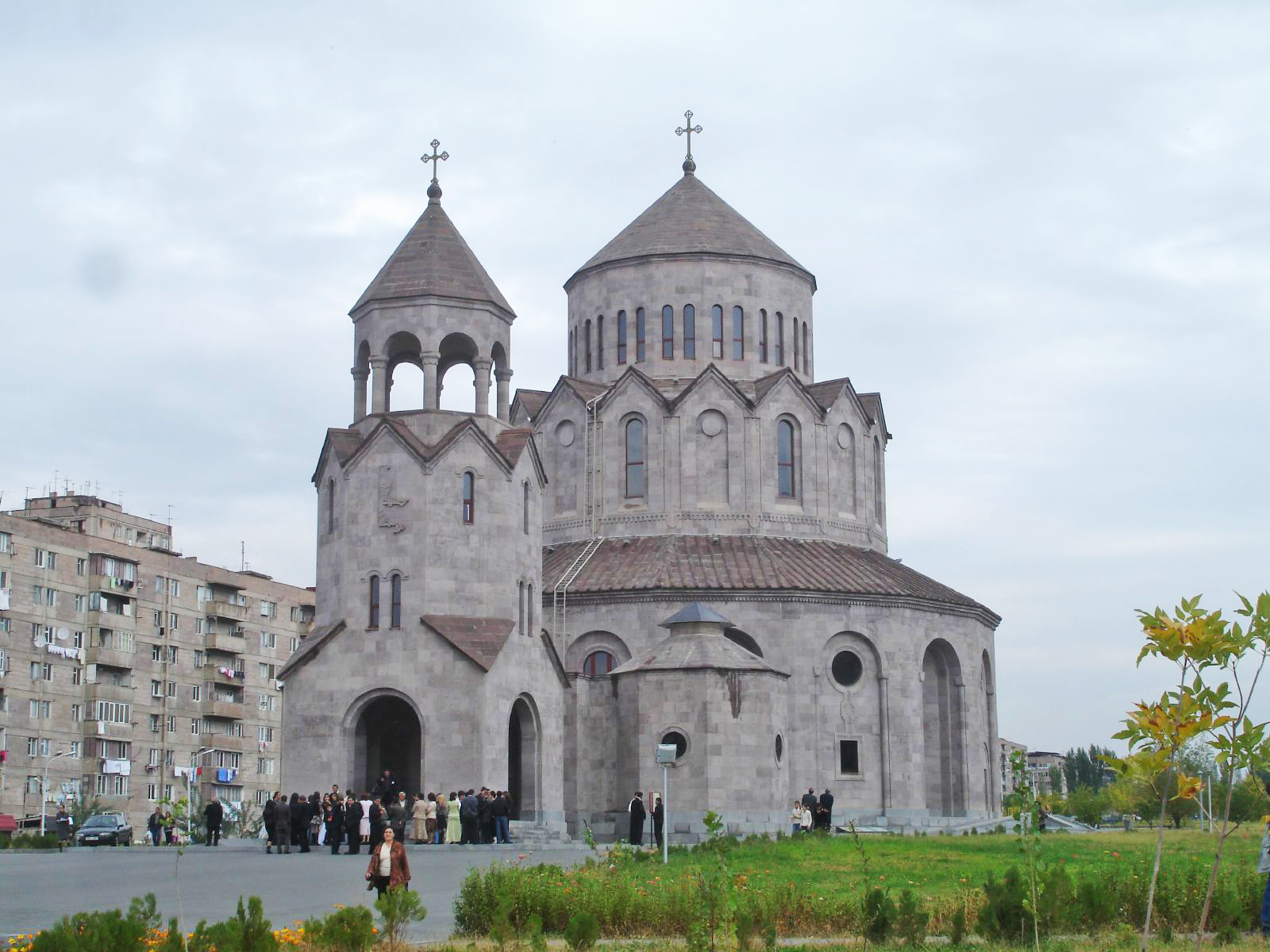
- The Holy Trinity Church

- Location within Armenia

Religion
- Affiliation: Armenian Apostolic Church
- Year consecrated: 2005

Location
- Location: Between Raffi and Svachian Streets, Malatia-Sebastia District, Yerevan, Armenia
- Coordinates: 40.174338°N 44.442404°E

Architecture
- Architect: Baghdasar Arzoumanian
- Style: Armenian
- Groundbreaking: 2001
- Completed: 2003

Holy Trinity Church (Armenian: Սուրբ Երրորդություն Եկեղեցի Surp Yerrordut'yun Yekeghets'i) is an Armenian Apostolic Church constructed in 2003 in the Malatia-Sebastia District of Yerevan, Armenia. It is modeled after the 7th century Zvartnots Cathedral.

The construction works of the church planned to be built on the South-Western District of Yerevan started in March 2001. The Church was built according to the project of architect Baghdasar Arzoumanian with the sponsorship of American Armenian national benefactor Mrs. Louise Simone Manoogian. On November 9, 2004, Karekin II, Catholicos of All Armenians, presided over the ceremony of consecration of the crosses of the Church of Holy Trinity. The Church of Holy Trinity was consecrated by Karekin II on November 20, 2005.

== Gallery ==
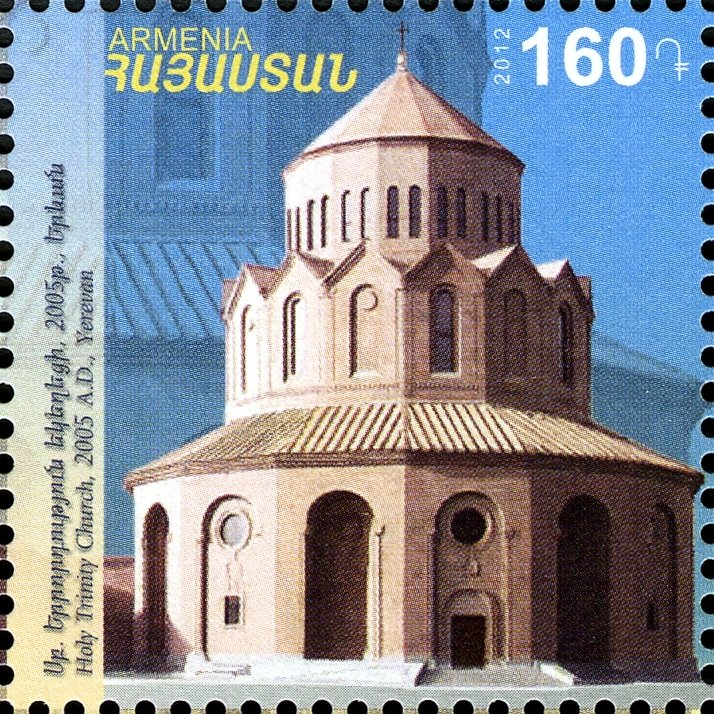

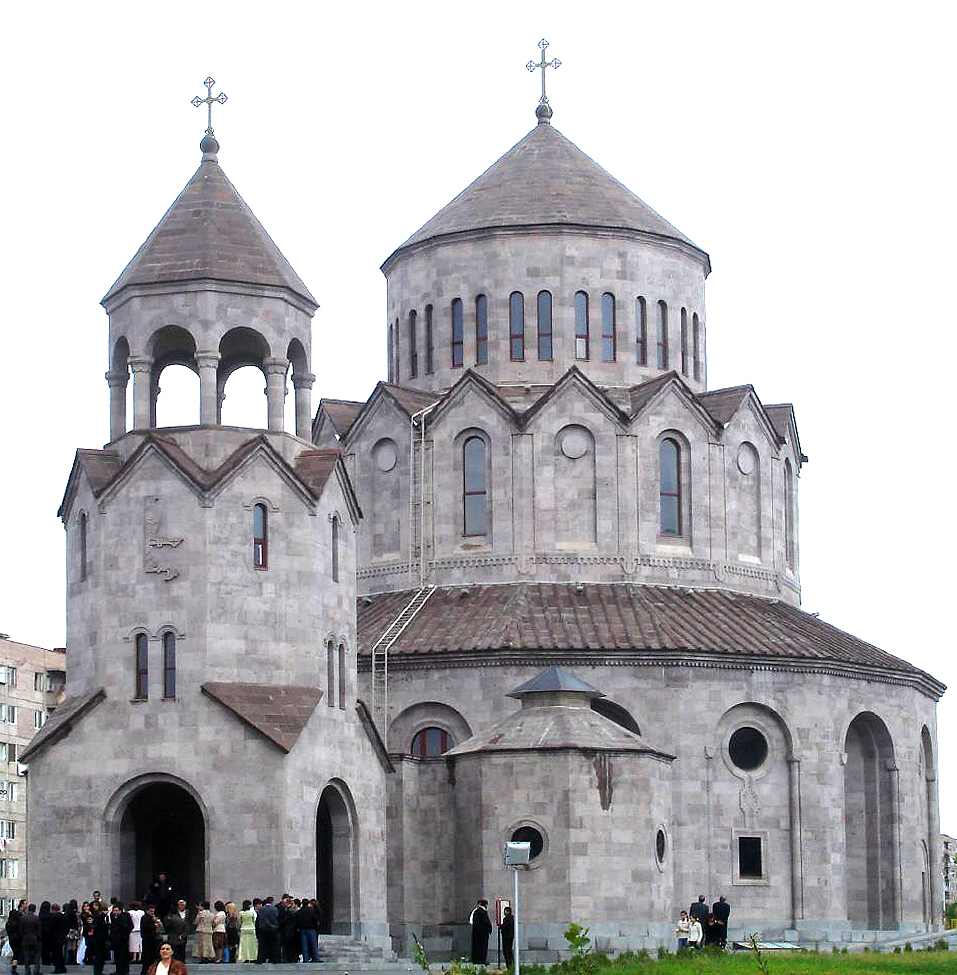

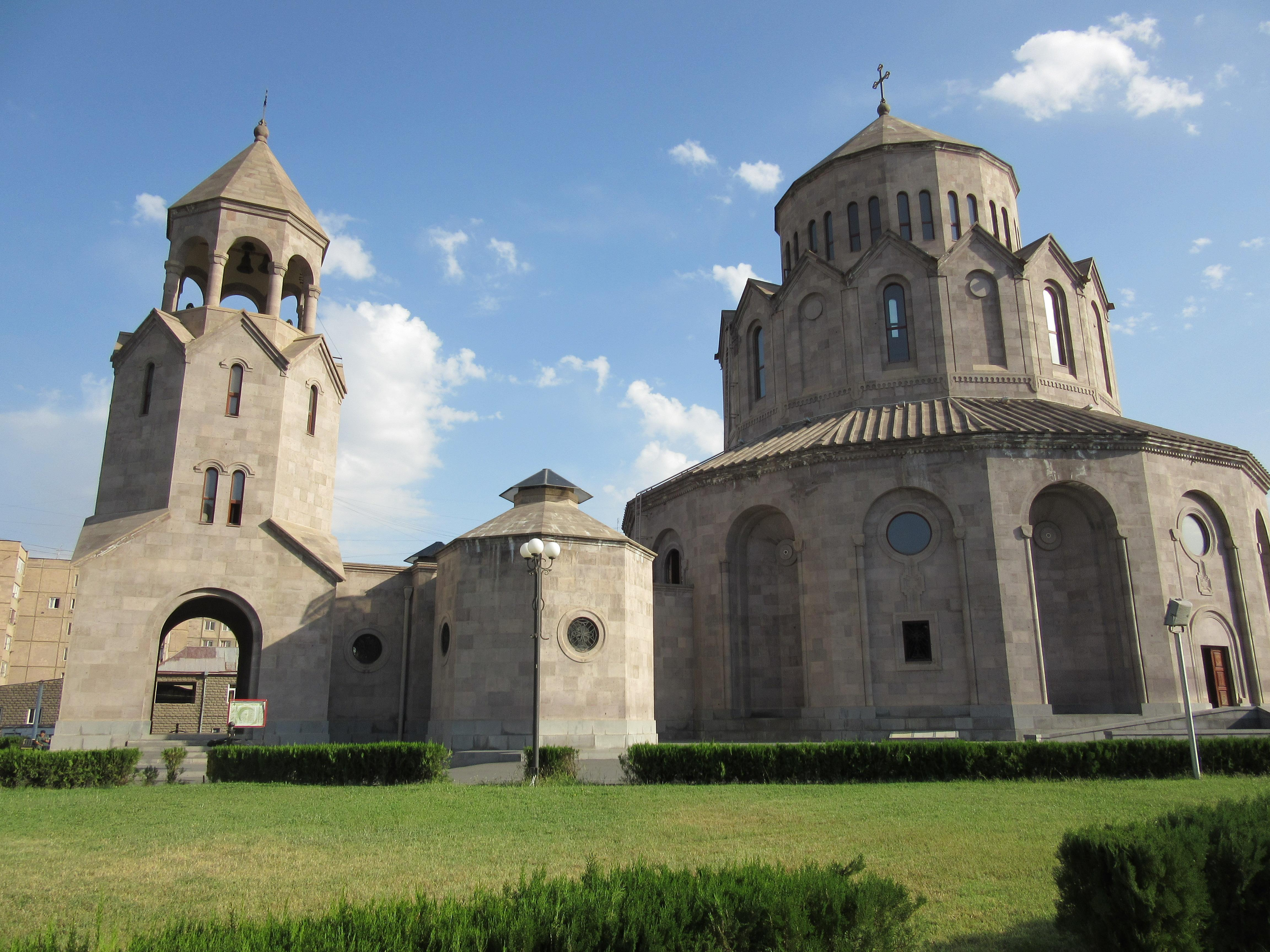

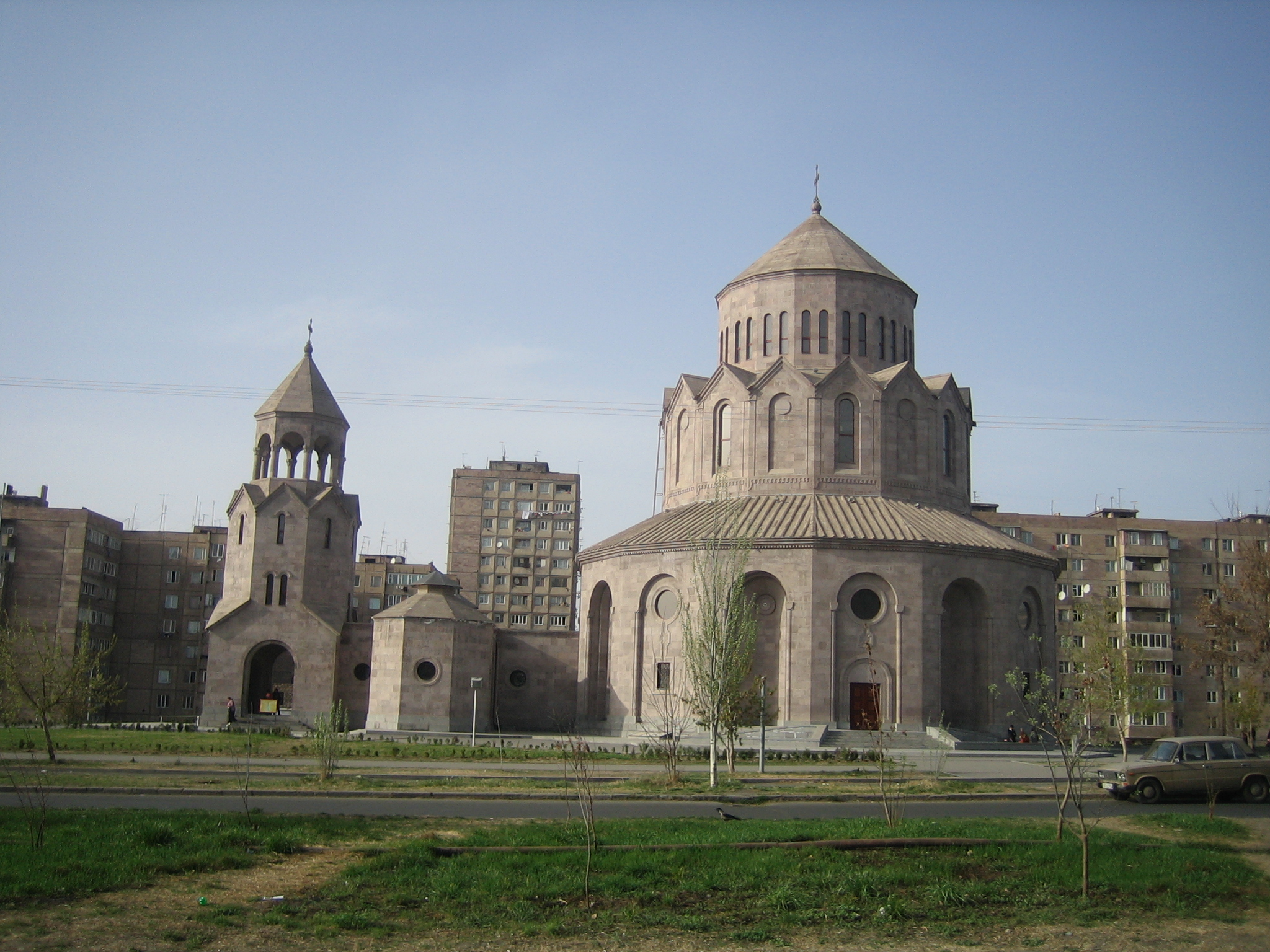
Side view of the Church

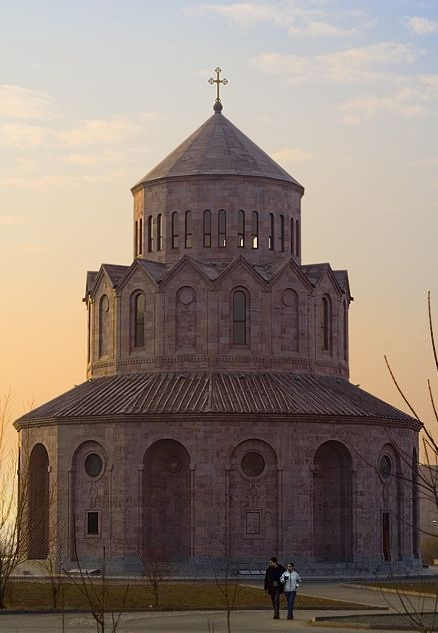
Surp Yerrortutyun (Holy Trinity)

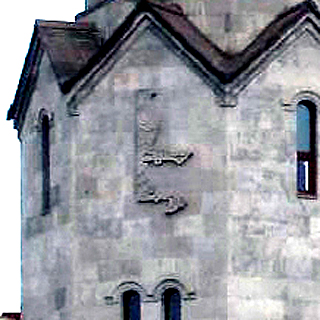
Entity sign "Է" ("E") on the wall of bell tower - the 7th letter of Armenian Alphabet, meaning "God"
