= Hayk Square =

Coordinates: 40°48′39″N 44°29′05″E

- Հայքի Հրապարակ (Armenian)
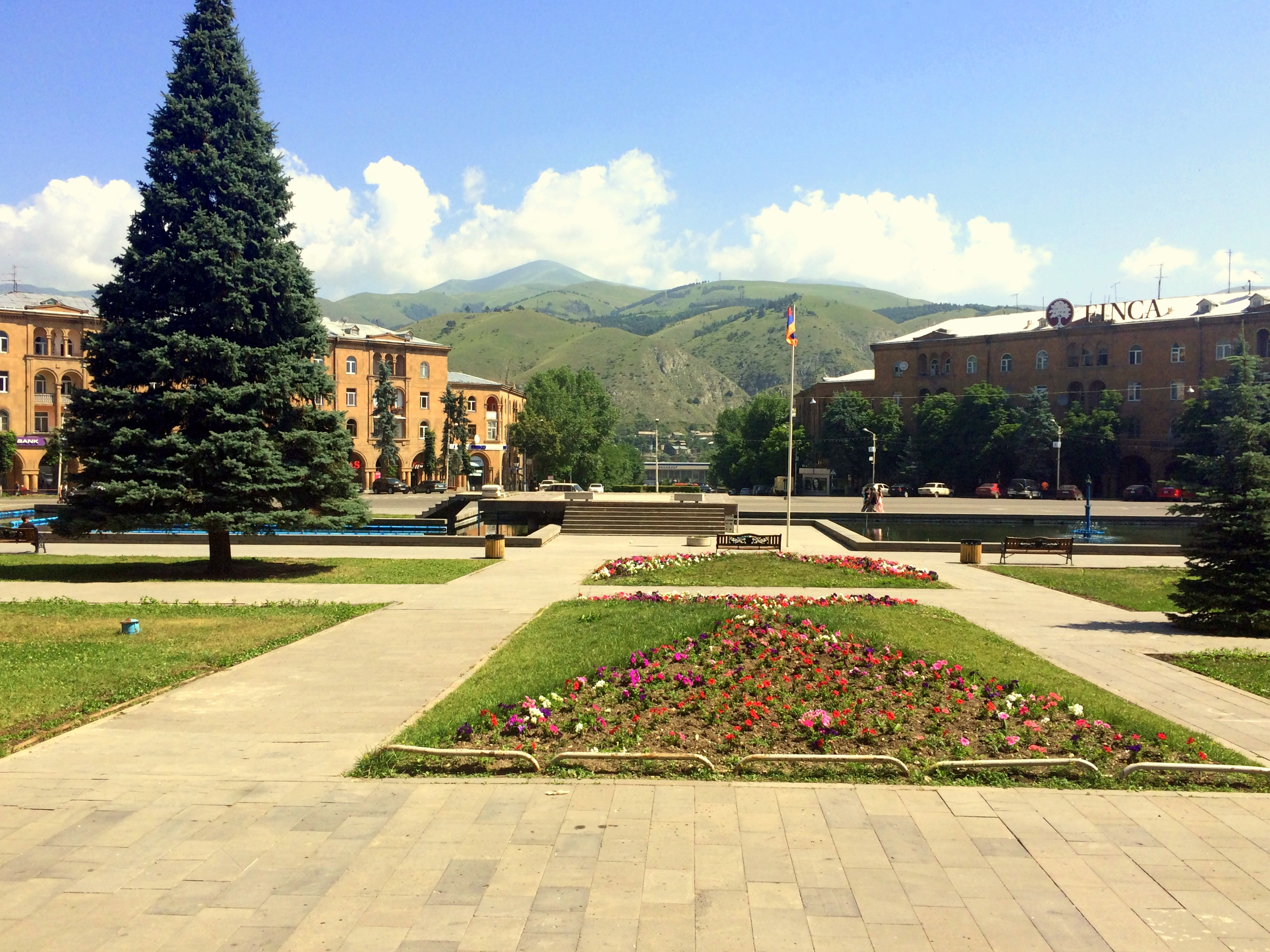
- Hayk Square
- Interactive map of Hayk Square
- Location: Vanadzor, Armenia

History
- Built: 1950s (completed)

Site notes
- Area: 13,000 m^{2} (140,000 sq ft)
- Architectural styles: mix of Armenian, Russian and neoclassical
- Governing body: Vanadzor City Council

Hayk Square (Armenian: Հայքի Հրապարակ Hayki Hraparak), is the large central town square in Vanadzor, Armenia. It is intersected by the Tigran Mets Avenue from the southeast the northwest, and the Movses Khorenatsi Street from the northeast.

The square was opened during the 1950s, based on the original plan designed by architects Baghdasar Arzoumanian and Hovhannes Margarian. During the Soviet period, the square was known as Kirov Square (Armenian: Կիրովի Հրապարակ), named after the Bolshevik leader Sergey Kirov. Kirov's statue was standing at the centre of the square until the independence of Armenia. It is envisaged to erect the statues of Hayk Nahapet and Tigranes the Great at the square.

== Description ==
Hayk square is decorated with several fountains at its central part. It is surrounded with notable buildings:

- The Lori Province administration building, occupying the southern part
- The Vanadzor City Hall - designed by Baghdasar Arzoumanian - occupying the eastern part
- Gugark Hotel - designed by Baghdasar Arzoumanian-, occupying the western part

== Gallery ==
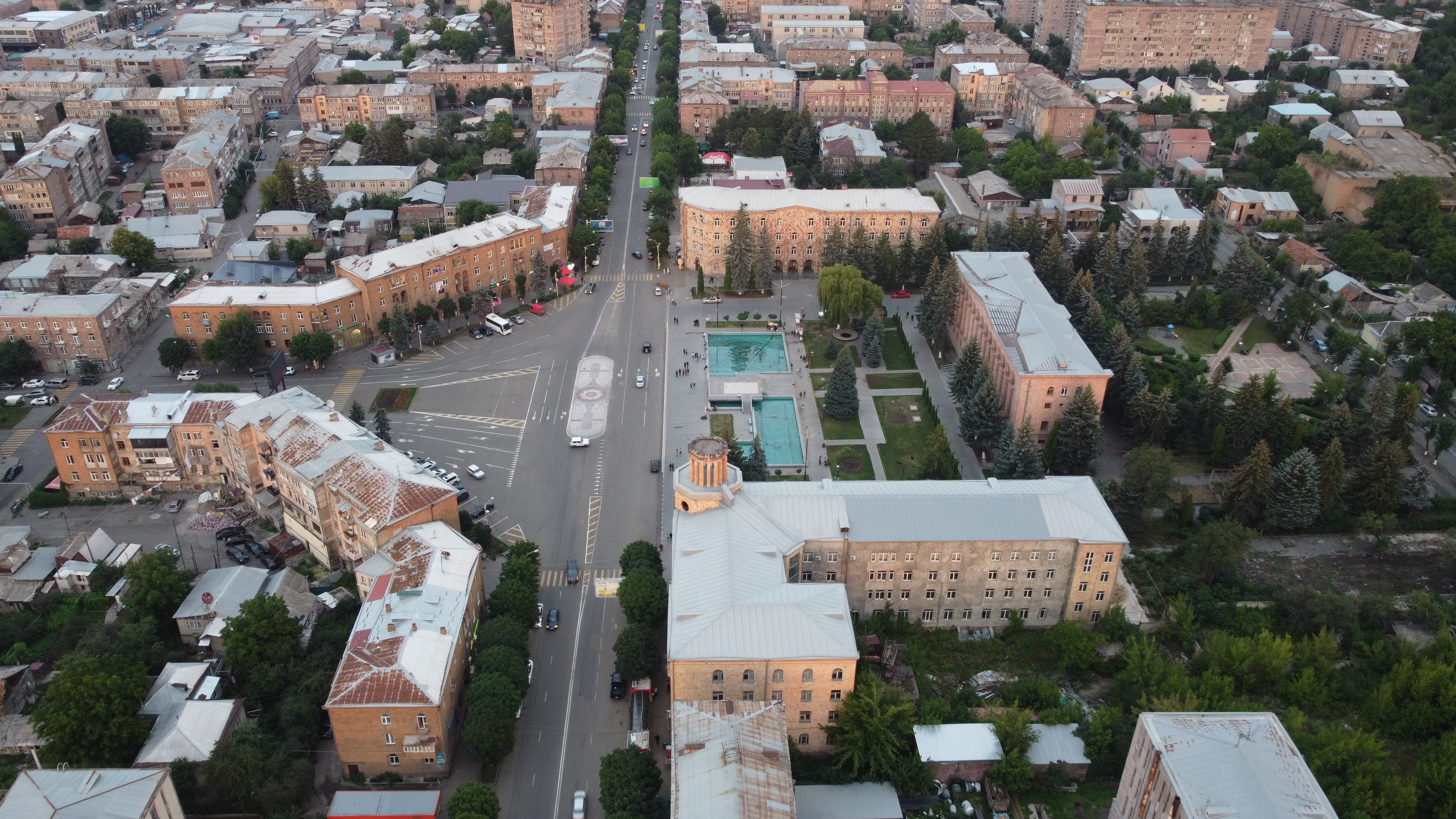
Hayk Square from above

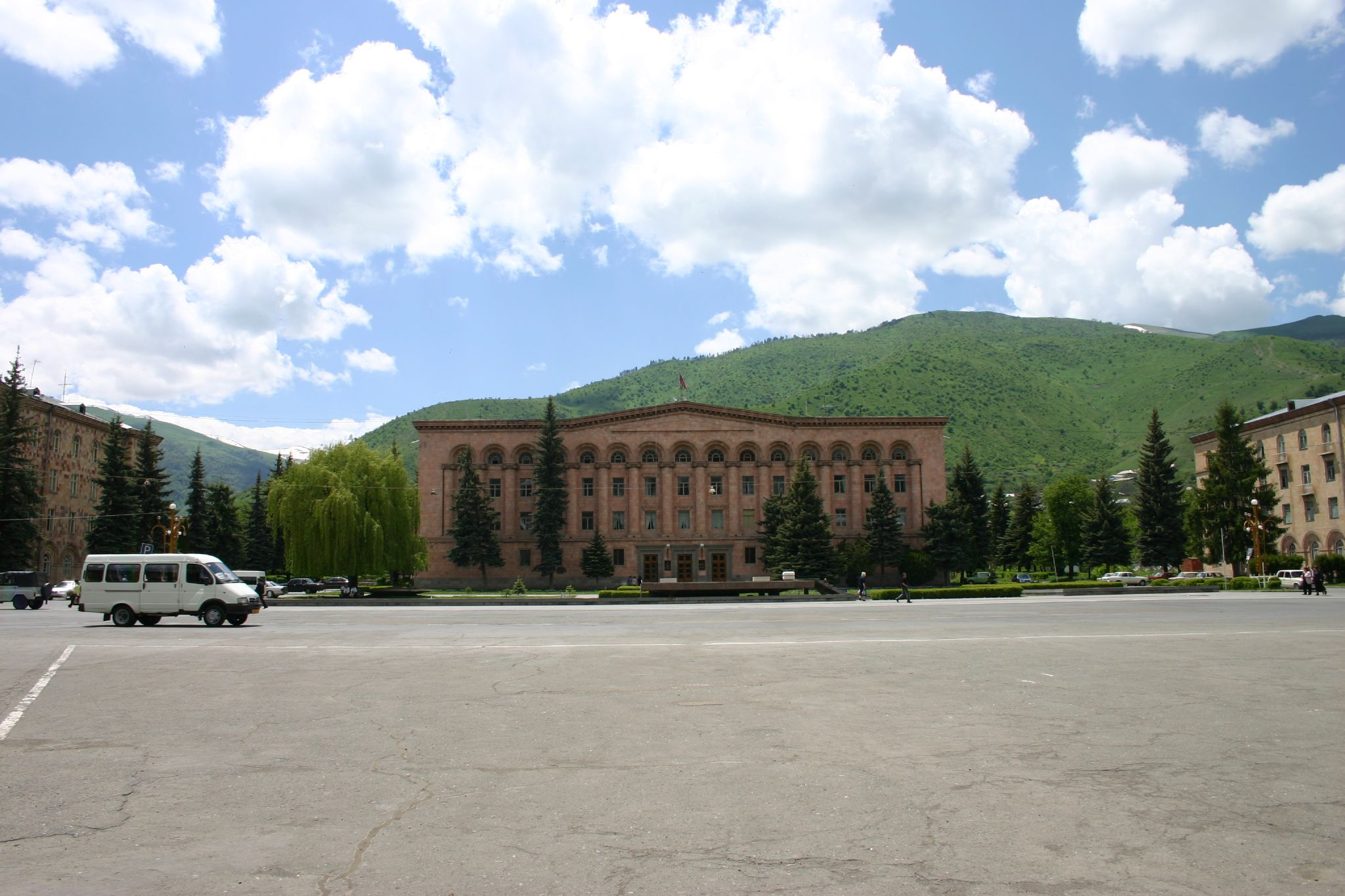
Lori province's administration

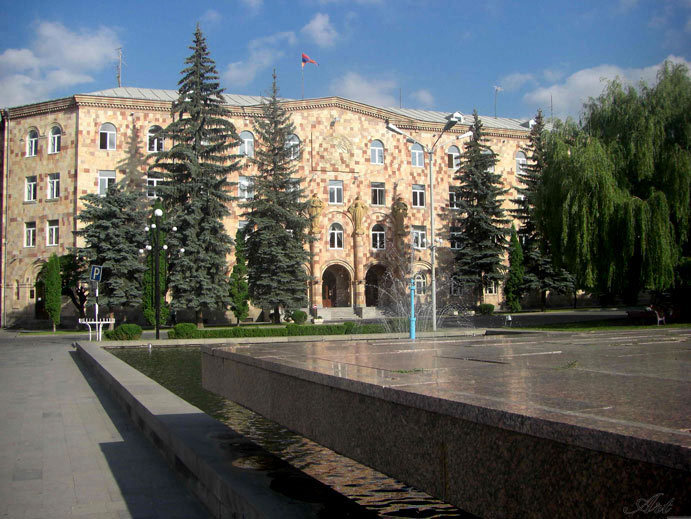
The city hall

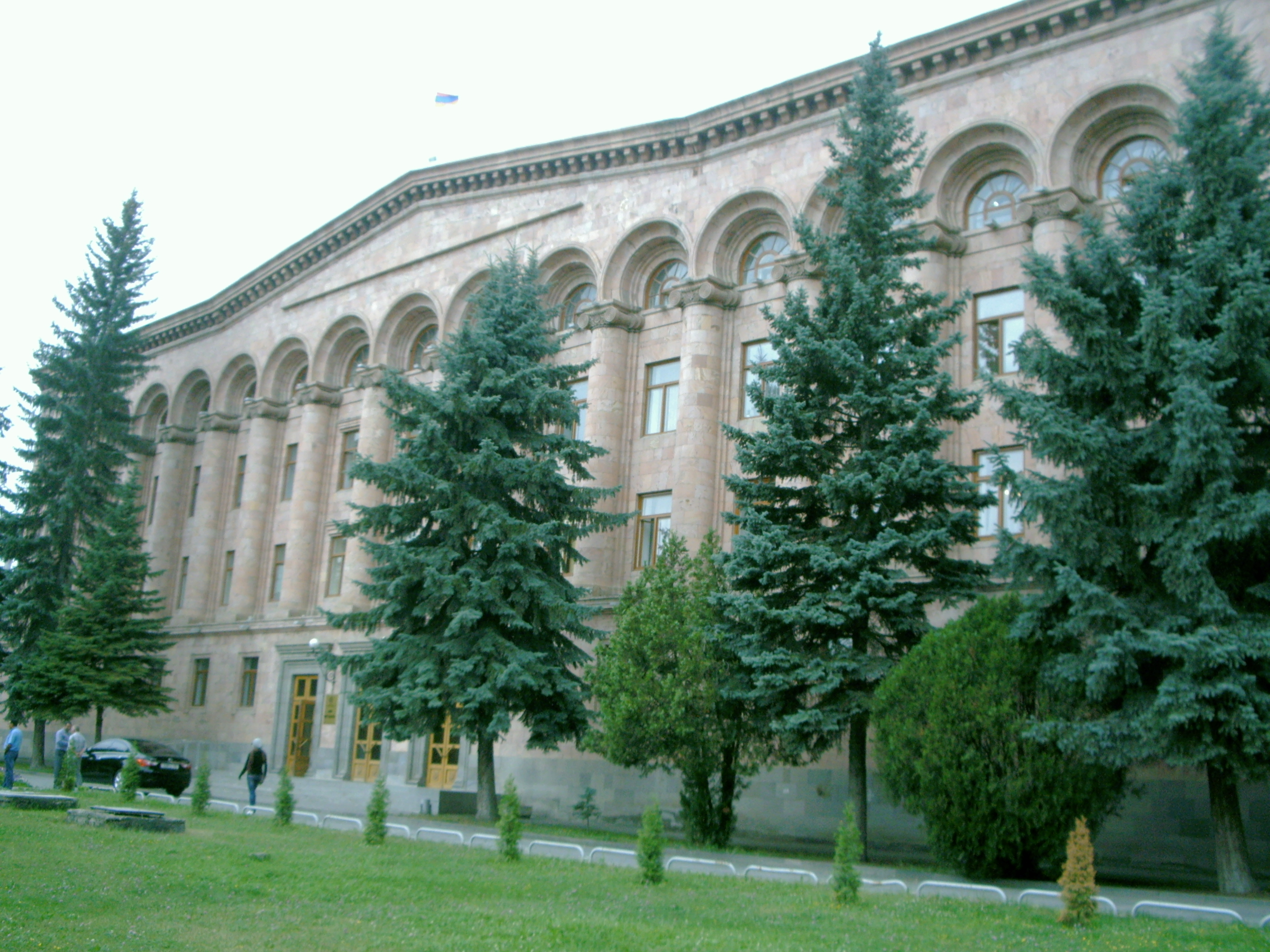
Lori Province administration

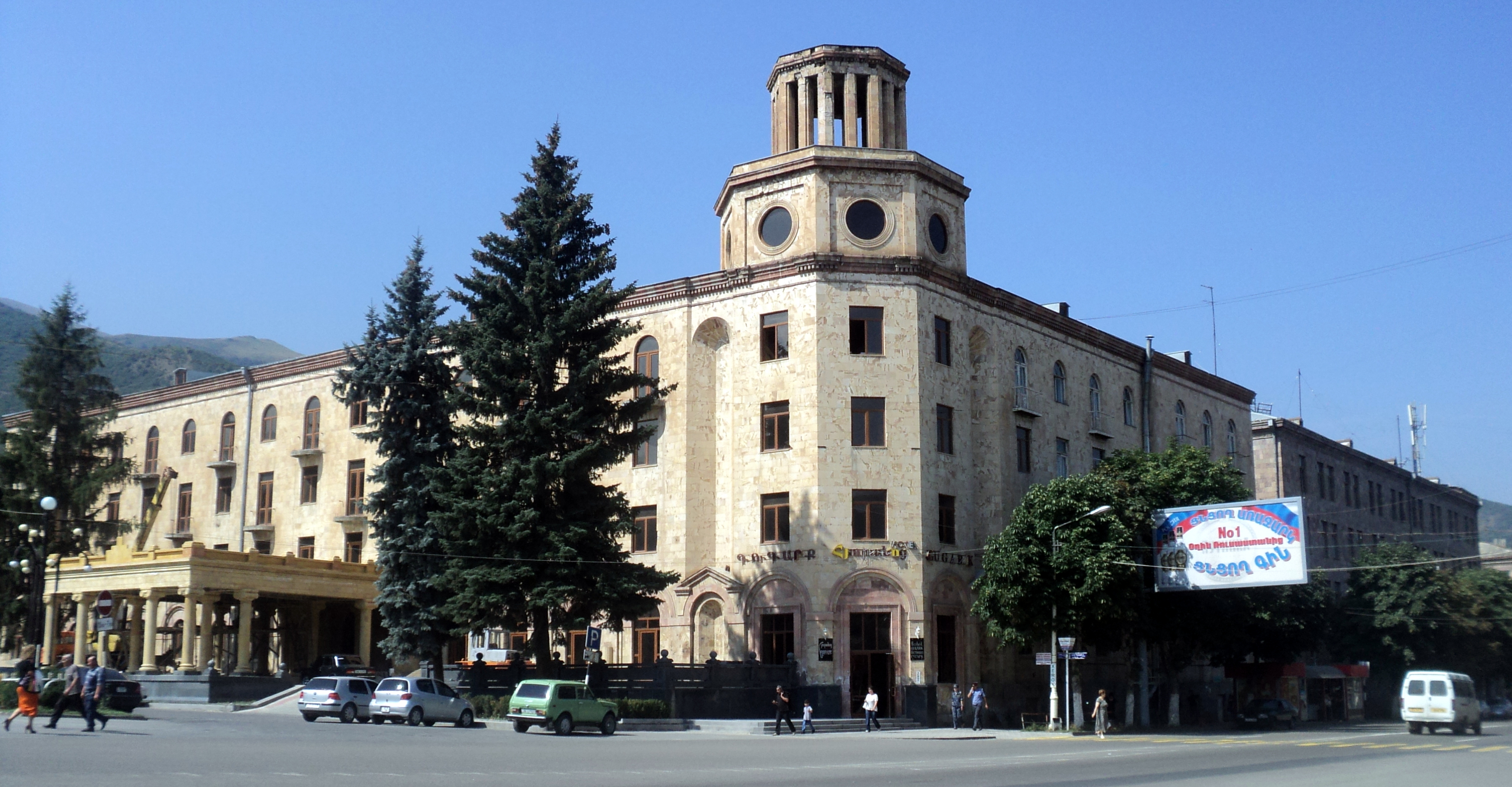
Gugark Hotel

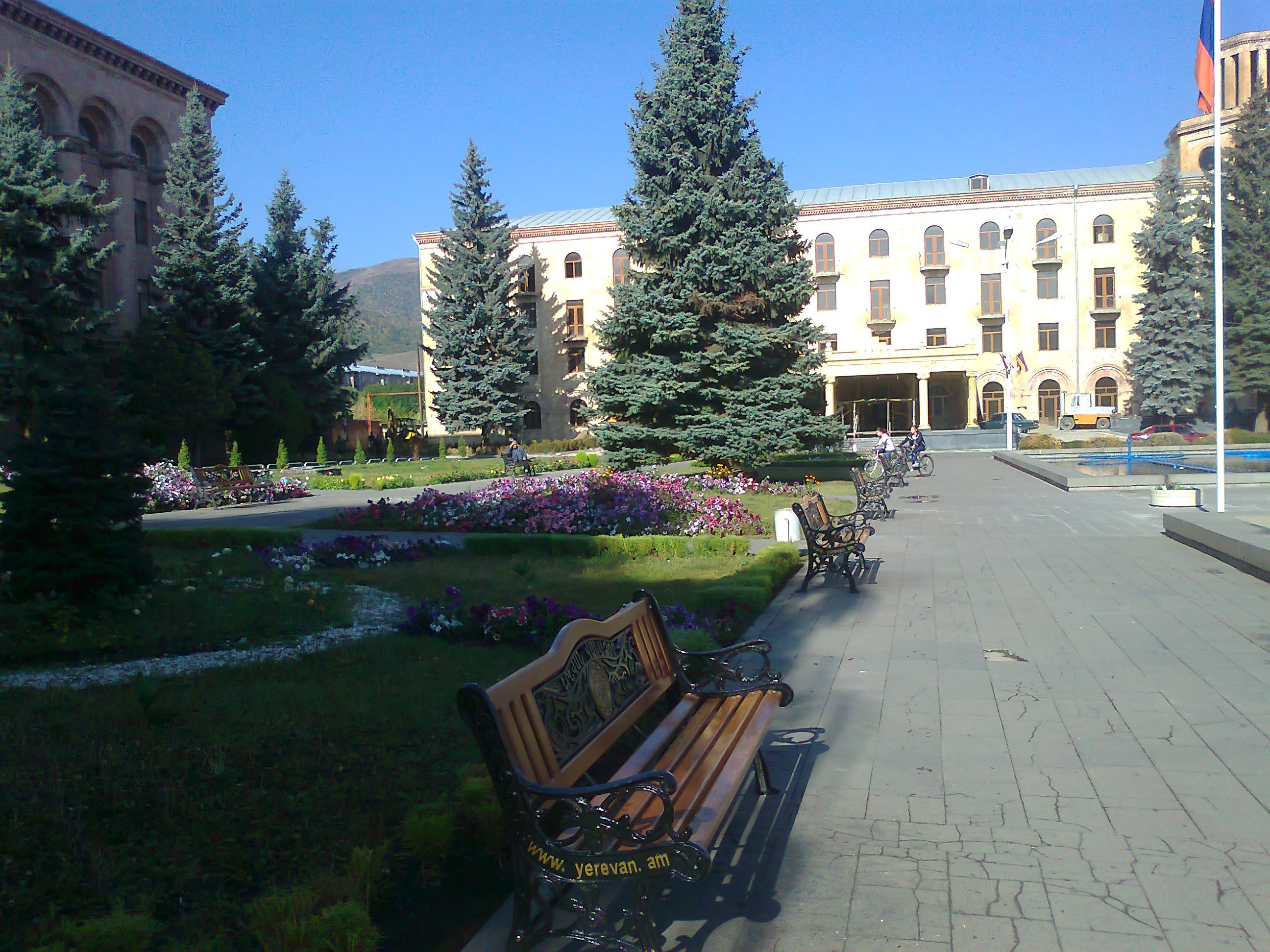
View of the Hayk Square
