= Baghdasar Arzoumanian =

Armenian architect (1916–2001)

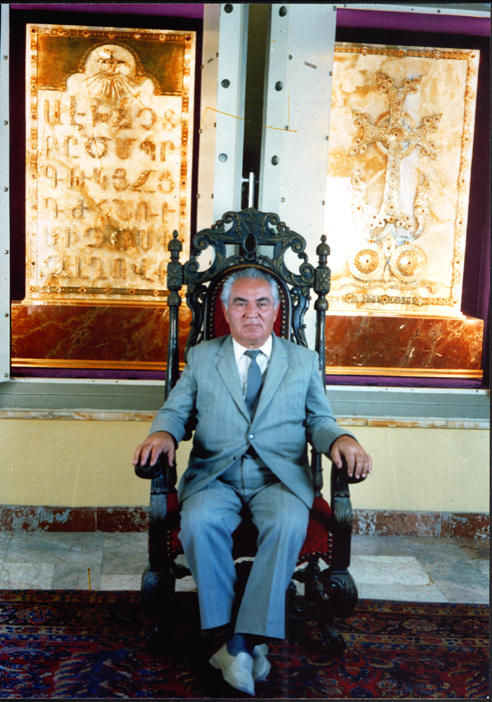
- Born: January 1, 1916 v. Bardzravan (currently Mutsk); Russian Empire
- Died: November 19, 2001 (aged 85); Yerevan, Armenia
- Occupation: Architect
- Awards: "St. Gregory the Illuminator" medal, Golden Medal of the Academy of Arts of the USSR (1991)
- Buildings: Alex and Marie Manoogian Treasury Museum, Holy Trinity Church in Yerevan
- Design: Golden Alphabet, Golden Cross

Baghdasar Arzoumanian (Armenian: Բաղդասար Արզումանյան; January 1, 1916 – November 19, 2001) (Note: also Bagdasar, Paghtasar, Paghtassar, Baghdik, Bagdik, Arzumanian, Arzoumanyan, Arzumanyan) was an Armenian architect and designer based in Yerevan, Armenia. He designed a large body of civil and religious buildings as well as many smaller works.

== Education and background ==
Arzoumanian was born in Mutsk, Syunik Province, Armenia. From 1928 to 1936 he studied at the Technical School. In 1938 he was admitted to the Constructions Department of the Institute for Polytechnical Sciences of Yerevan. In 1942 he entered the Soviet army and took part in World War II. He served in the army until 1946 when he returned to Yerevan to continue his studies. He graduated from the Institute in 1949.

During his professional career he worked with the Yerevan Project Institute and the Armenian Church headquarters in Etchmiadzin.

He died on November 19, 2001, in Yerevan.

== Civil buildings ==
Arzoumanian is the architect of many civil buildings in Armenia. Below are some of his most important buildings:

- City hall of Vanadzor and Hotel Gougark in the Hayk Square (then known as Kirov Square) of the city of Vanadzor, completed during the 1950s (co-architect: Hovhannes Margarian).
- Erebuni Museum (1968, co-architect: Shmavon Azatian).
- Museum dedicated to 2450th anniversary of establishment of Samarkand, Uzbekistan (now the Samarkand Museum of History)
- Metro Station "David of Sasoun", Armenian: Սասունցի Դավիթ (co-architects: Sargis Nersisian and Areg Israyelian).
- Degustation Hall of the Yerevan Brandy Factory (co-architects: Sargis Nersisian and Hasmik Alexanian).
- Yerevan Cable-way Station.
City hall of Vanadzor

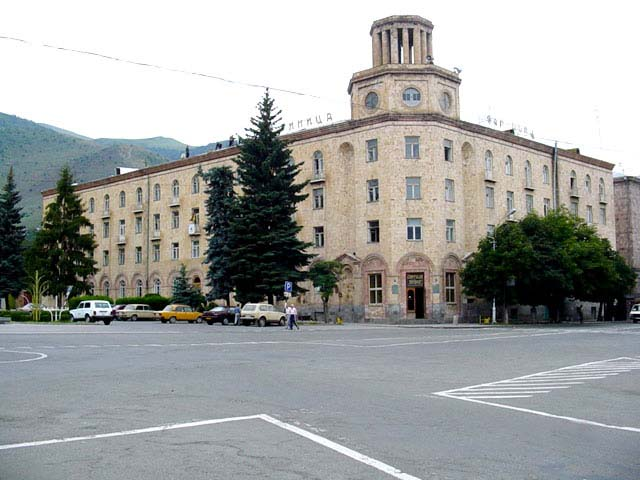
Hotel Gougark in Vanadzor

Arzoumanian is architect or co-architect of the RA Police building in Yerevan, various apartment buildings, reconstruction of Moscow Cinema in Yerevan. He is the architect of memorials to the victory in World War II in various parts of Armenia.

== Etchmiadzin (1956–2001) ==
=== Early works ===
- Vanatoon (Monastic Residence) – 1978
- Alex and Marie Manoogian Museum – 1982
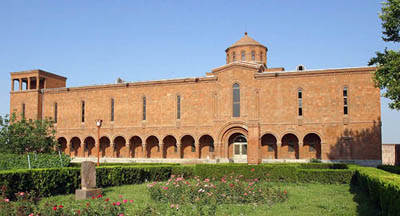
Alex and Marie Manoogian Museum at the Mother See.

=== Design works ===
==== Khachkars and memorials ====
Arzoumanian designed many khachkars (Armenian stone crosses) and memorials. Many of them are in Etchmiadzin (i.e. the Motherland-Diaspora Memorial). He is also the architect of a memorial in the monastery of Geghard, and a memorial and khachkars next to the Prelacy of the Araratian Patriarchal Diocese.

Khachkar next to the Prelacy of the Araratian Patriarchal Diocese

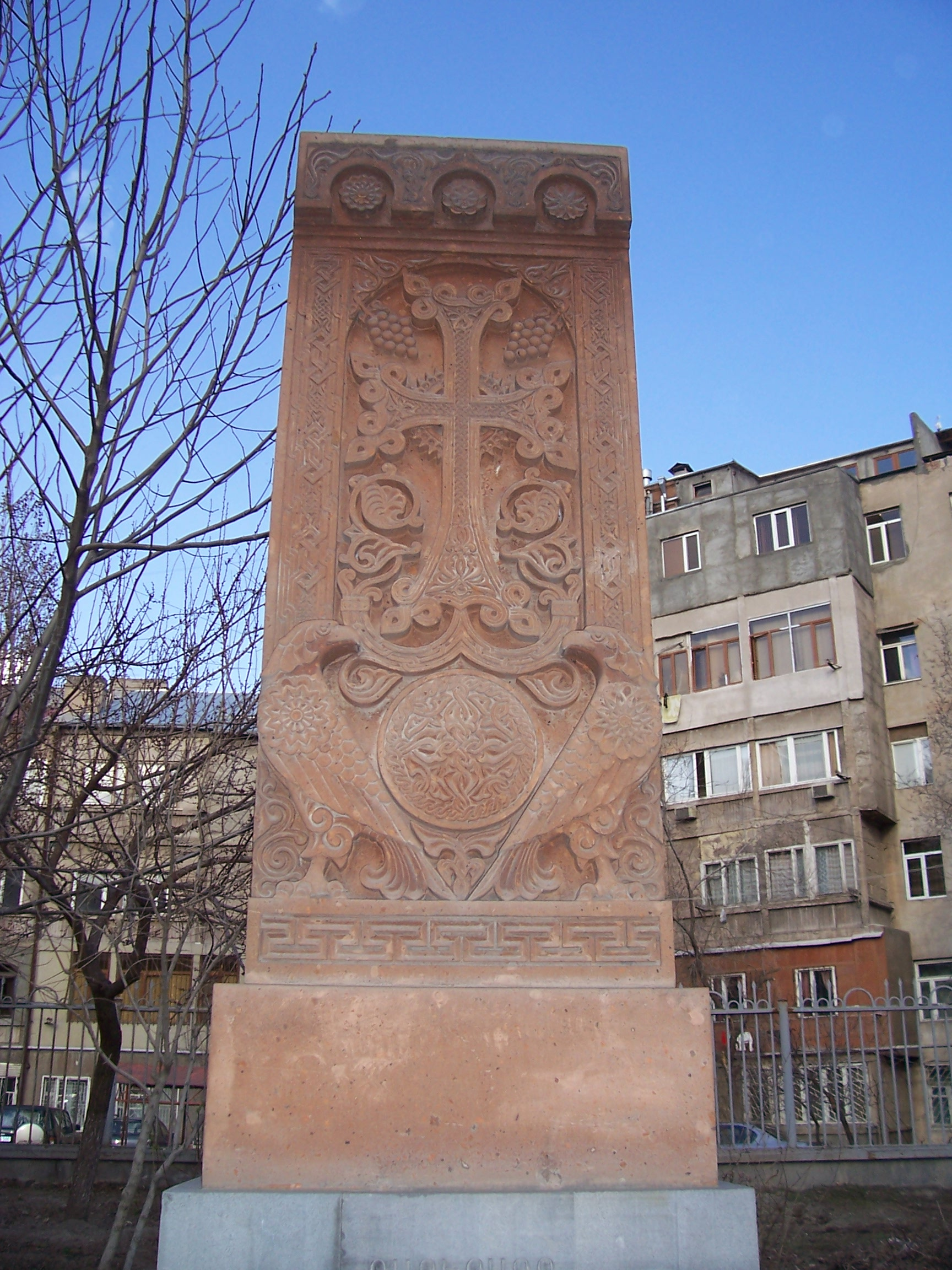
Khachkar next to the Prelacy of the Araratian Patriarchal Diocese

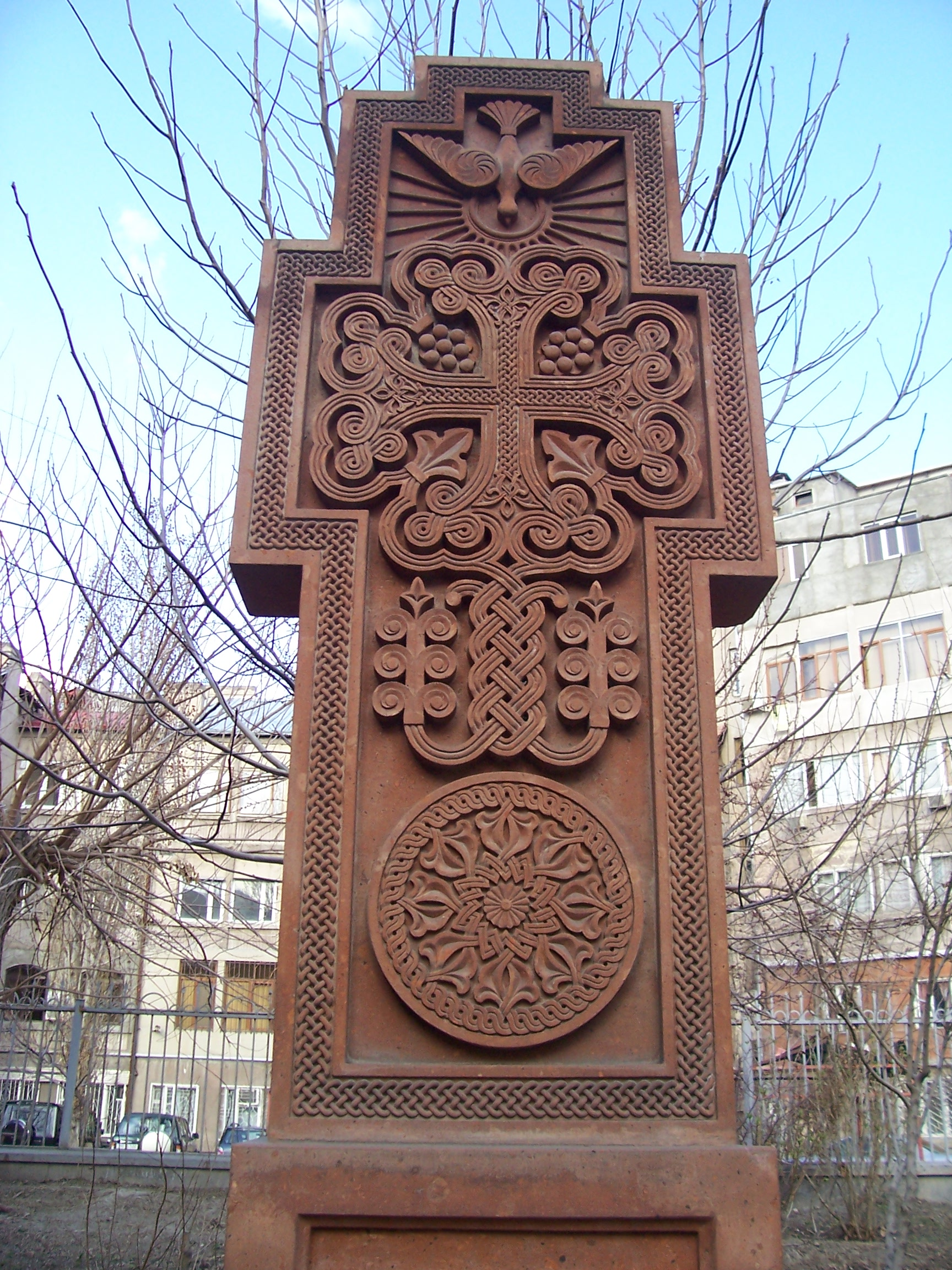
Khachkar next to the Prelacy of the Araratian Patriarchal Diocese

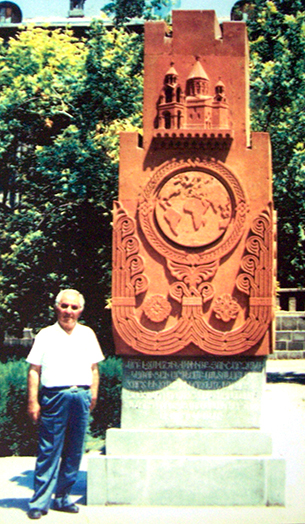
Arzoumanian at the Motherland-Diaspora Memorial in Etchmiadzin

==== Jewellery works ====
His Golden Alphabet (1976) and Golden Cross (1979) are kept in the Pontifical Residence of the Catholicos of All Armenians. Among his other works are:

- State Emblem of the Soviet Armenia (1981)
- Souvenir dedicated to the 30th anniversary of service of Vasken I, Catholicos of All Armenians (1985)

The list also includes various crosiers, rings, the liturgical dressing of the Catholicos of All Armenians. Arzoumanian is the designer of catholicosal medals St. Gregory the Illuminator, St. Sahak – St. Mesrop, and St. Nerses Shnorhali (Nerses the Gracious).

Golden Alphabet of Baghdasar Arzoumanian

Golden Cross of Baghdasar Arzoumanian

Chalice of the Catholicos of All Armenians (1965)

Crosier (Armenian: ասան) of the Catholicos of All Armenians (1962)

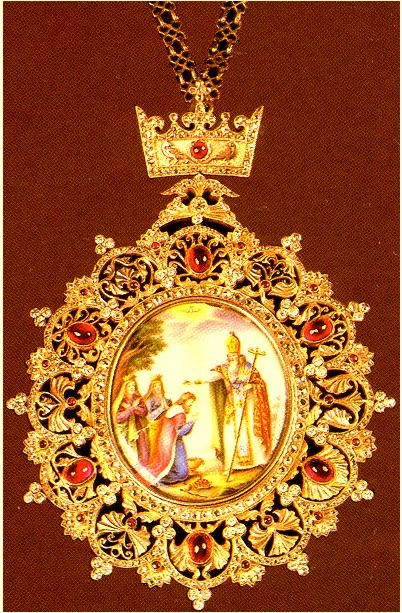
Patriarchal Panagia

St. Gregory the Illuminator Medal of the Mother See of Holy Etchmiadzin

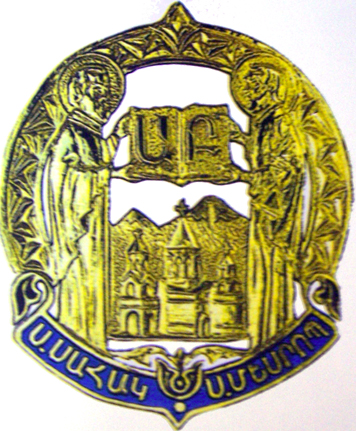
St. Sahak – St. Mesrop Medal of the Mother See of Holy Etchmiadzin

St. Nerses Shnorhali Medal of the Mother See of Holy Etchmiadzin

==== Interior design ====
Throne Hall of the Catholicos of All Armenians

Baghdasar Arzoumanian is the author of the Throne Hall of the Catholicos of All Armenians.

===== Iconostases =====
Besides iconostases of the churches of his own design, Arzoumanian is the author of the iconostases of following churches:

- St. Sarkis Vicarial Church of Yerevan, Armenia (authors of renovation: Rafayel Israyelian and Artsrun Galikyan),
- St. Catherine Armenian Church of Saint Petersburg, Russia.

==== Graphical works ====
Arzoumanian also designed graphics which include the design of Etchmiadzin Monthly, Catholicosal Decrees, and book designs. He is the graphical designer and the author of the text of the book "Armenian Churches".

==== Tombstones ====
Baghdasar Arzoumanian designed the tombstones of:

- Vazgen I, Catholicos of All Armenians,
- Karekin I, Catholicos of All Armenians,
- Saint Mesrob Mashtots.
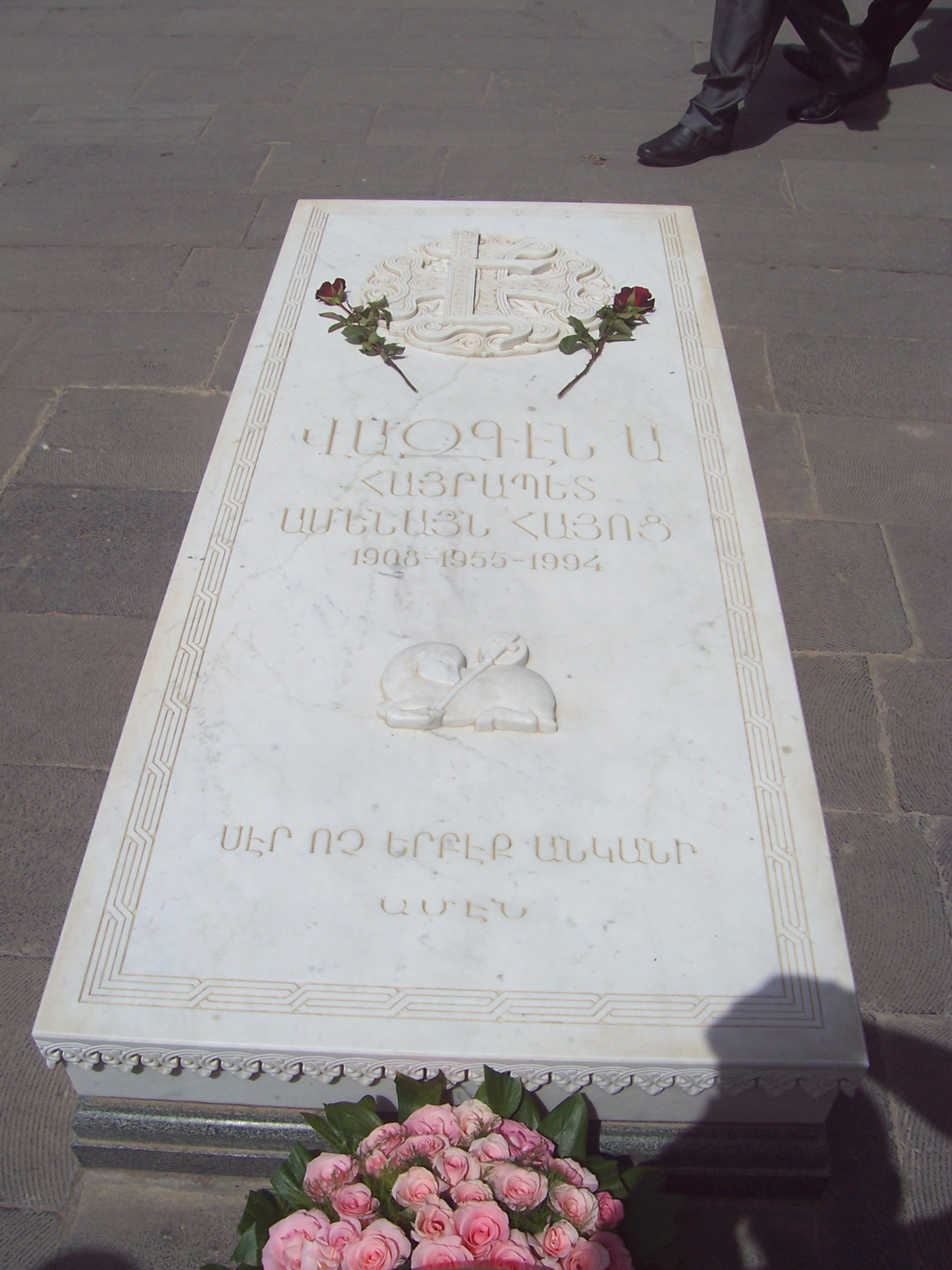
Tombstone of Vazgen I

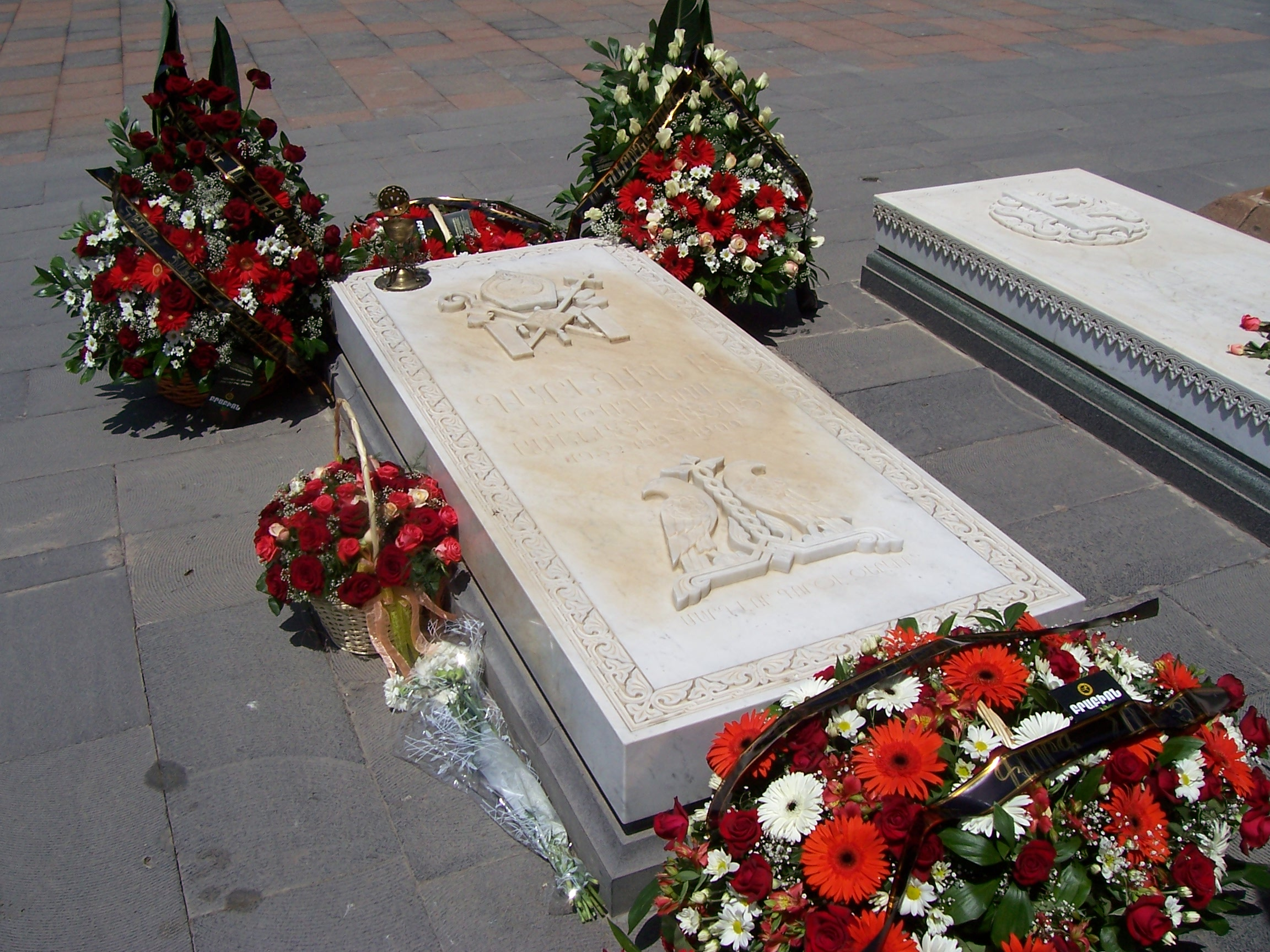
Tombstone of Karekin I

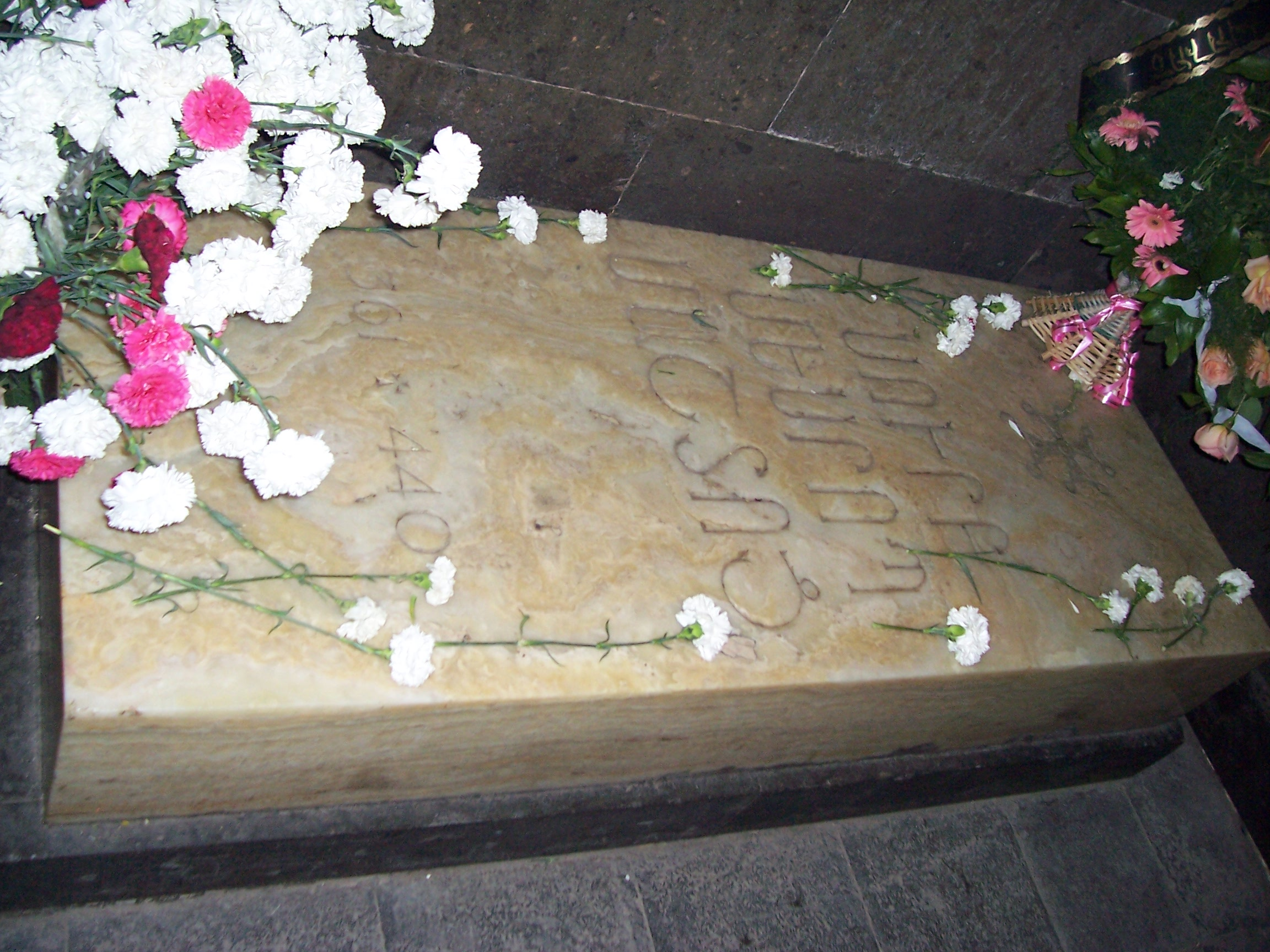
Tombstone of St. Mesrop Mashtots

==== Other works ====
Baghdasar Arzoumanian is the author of the "Dpratoun" building in Oshakan, Armenia. He is also the designer of the entrance door of the Residence of the Catholicos of All Armenians.

=== Churches ===
Baghdasar Arzoumanian is the architect of 8 Armenian churches and 2 renovation projects.

==== Renovation projects ====
Arzoumanian is the author of renovation of the following churches:

- St. John the Baptist Church of Yerevan (entire renovation and the bell-tower),
- St. Gregory the Illuminator Church of the Kinali Island, Turkey.
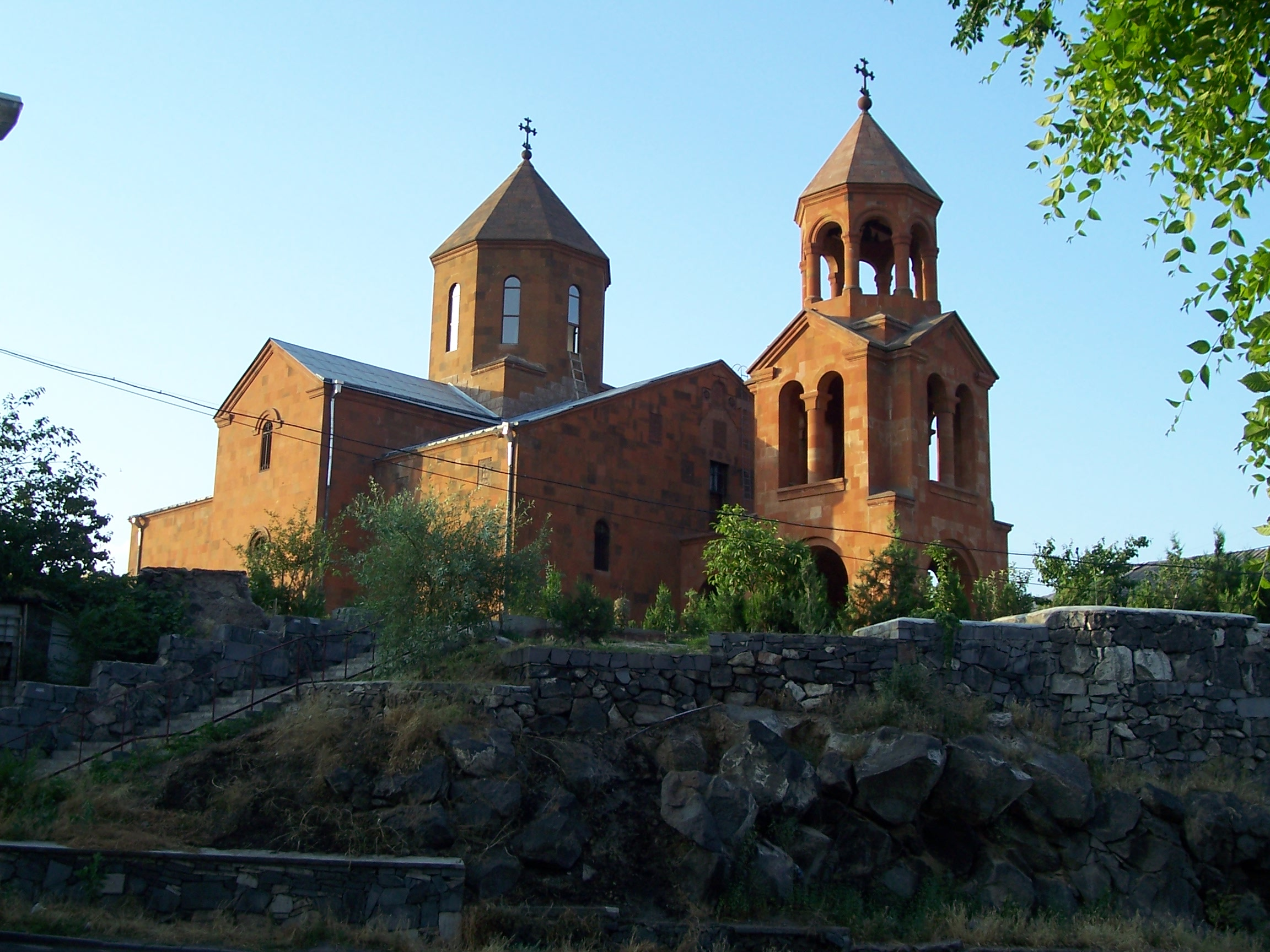
St. John the Baptist Church of Yerevan.

==== New churches ====
Arzoumanian is the architect of the following churches:

- St. Gregory the Illuminator Armenian Church in Odesa, Ukraine (1995),
- St. Sarkis Church of Nork District of Yerevan, Armenia (1999),
- Holy Resurrection Church of Nerkin Dvin, Armenia,
- Holy Resurrection Church of Spitak, Armenia (1999),
- Holy Martyrs Church of Kashatagh, Nagorno-Karabakh Republic (2002, the church was consecrated after his death),
- St. Hakob (James) Church of Gyumri, Armenia (2002, the church was consecrated after his death),
- St. Hakob (James) Church of the Vaskenian Theological Academy near Sevan, Armenia
- Holy Trinity Church of Yerevan, Armenia (2005, the church was consecrated after his death).
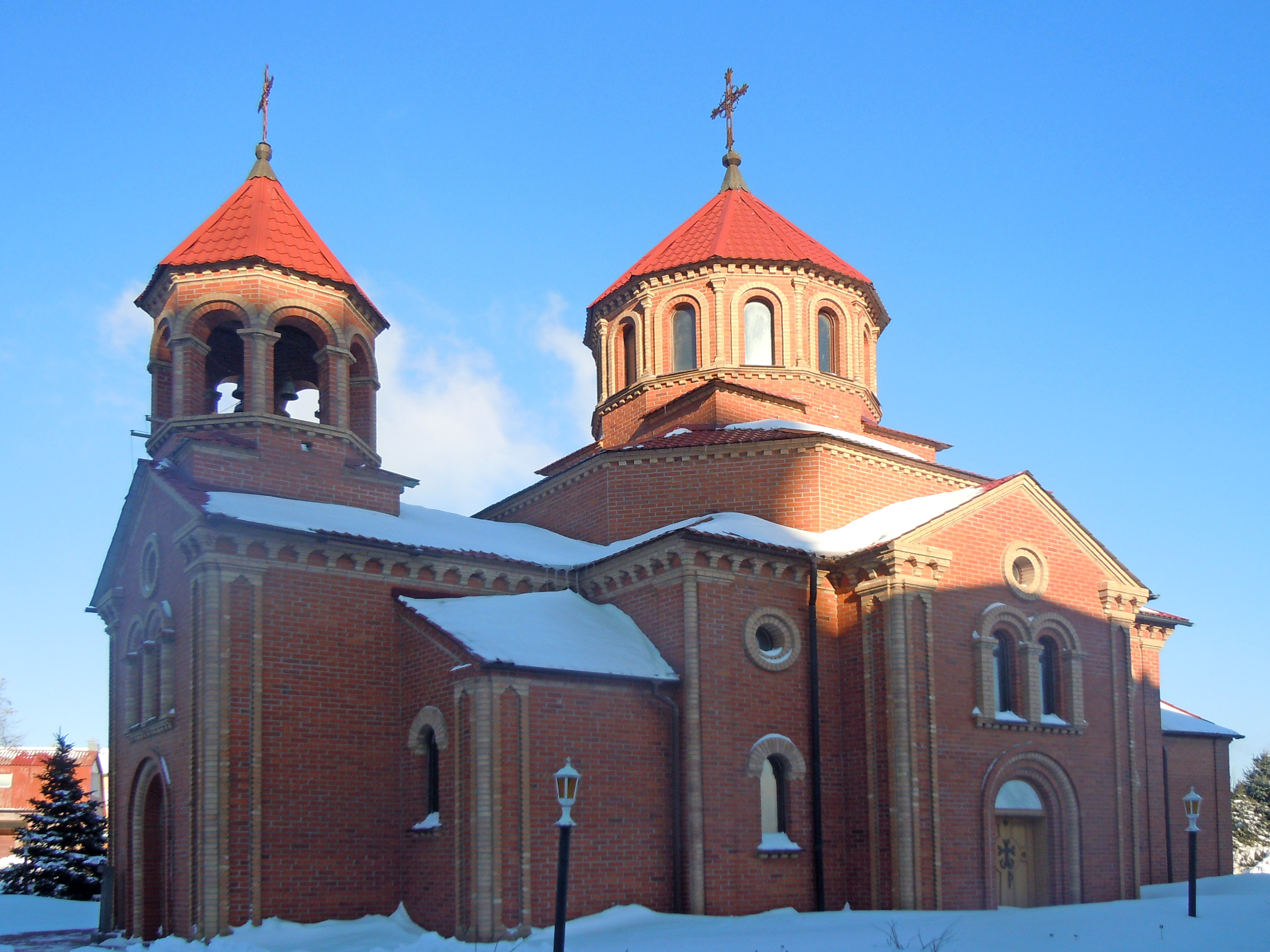
St. Gregory the Illuminator Armenian Church in Odesa

St. Sarkis Church of Nork District of Yerevan

Holy Martyrs Church of Kashatagh

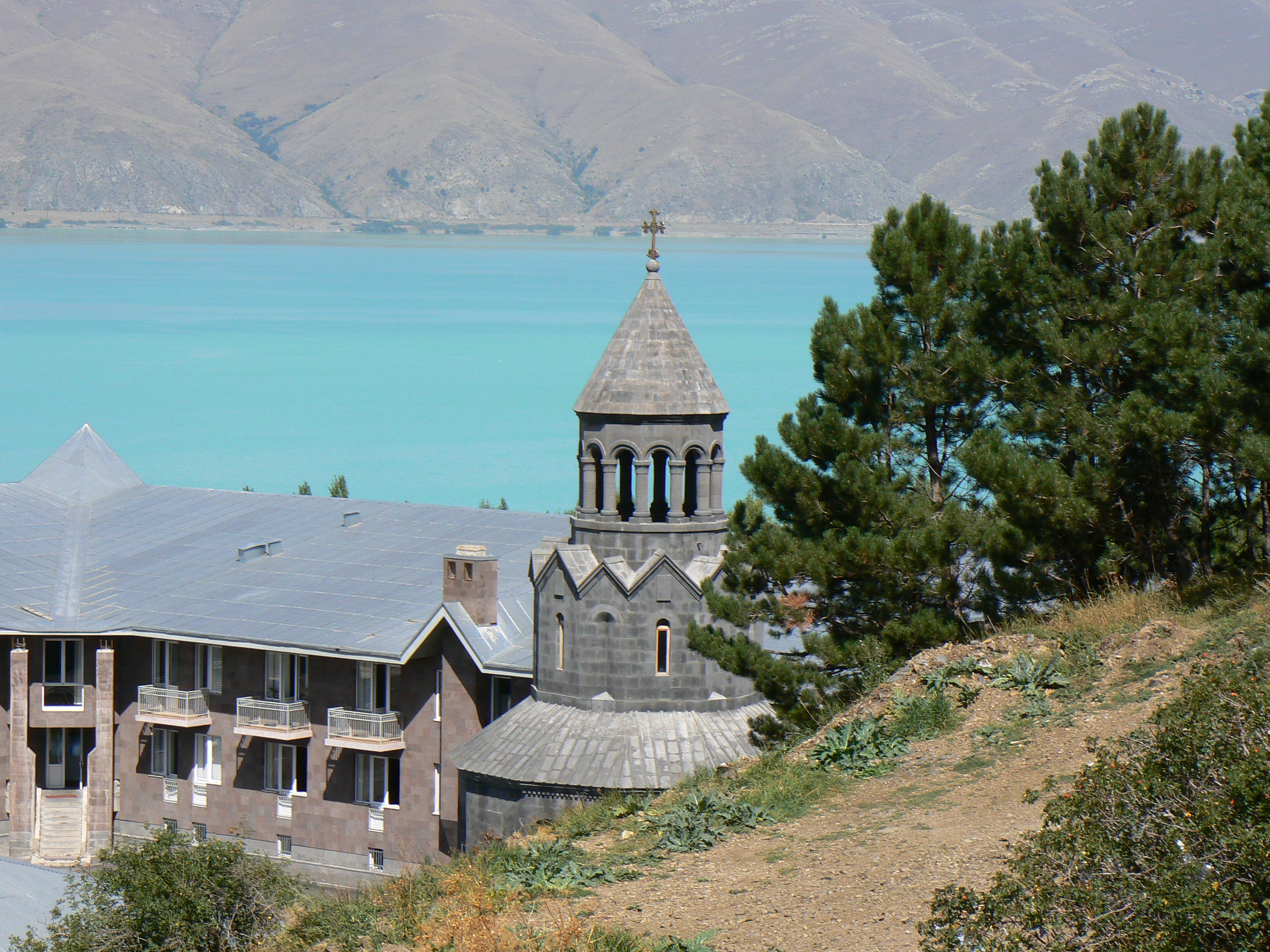
St. Hakob (James) Church of the Vaskenian Theological Academy near Sevan

== Medals and awards ==
- St. Gregory the Illuminator Medal
- Golden Medal of the Academy of Arts of the USSR (1991)
- Title of Merited Constructor of Armenia (1966)

Arzoumanian also holds medals for his military career during World War II (2nd Order Medal of the Patriotic War, Red Star Medal, Medal of Honour, Medal of Bravery, Medal for Victory against Germany, Medal for Taking Kyoniksberg, Medal of Marshal Baghramian).

== Gallery ==
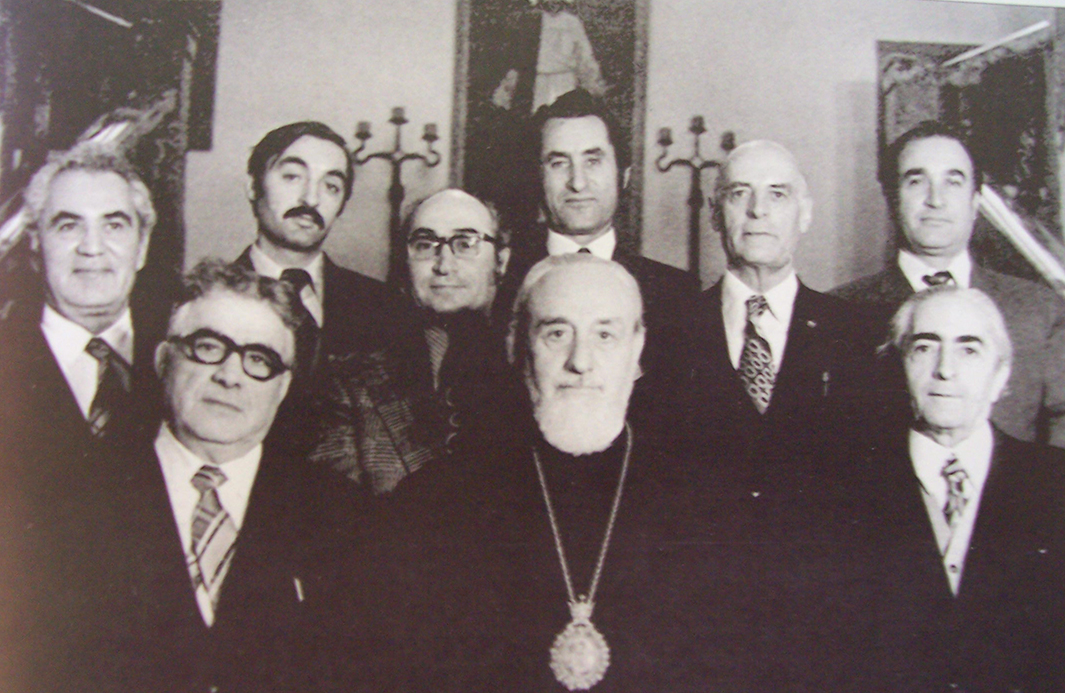
Architectural Commission of the Mother See of Holy Etchmiadzin (1970–1988).
First row from left: Varazdat Harutyunyan, Vazgen I, K. Altunyan
Second row from left: Arzoumanian, H. Babakhanian, Grigor Khanjyan, A. Galikyan, M. Hovhannisyan

Entrance door of the Catholicos's residence (Arzoumanian and Vazgen I are at left)

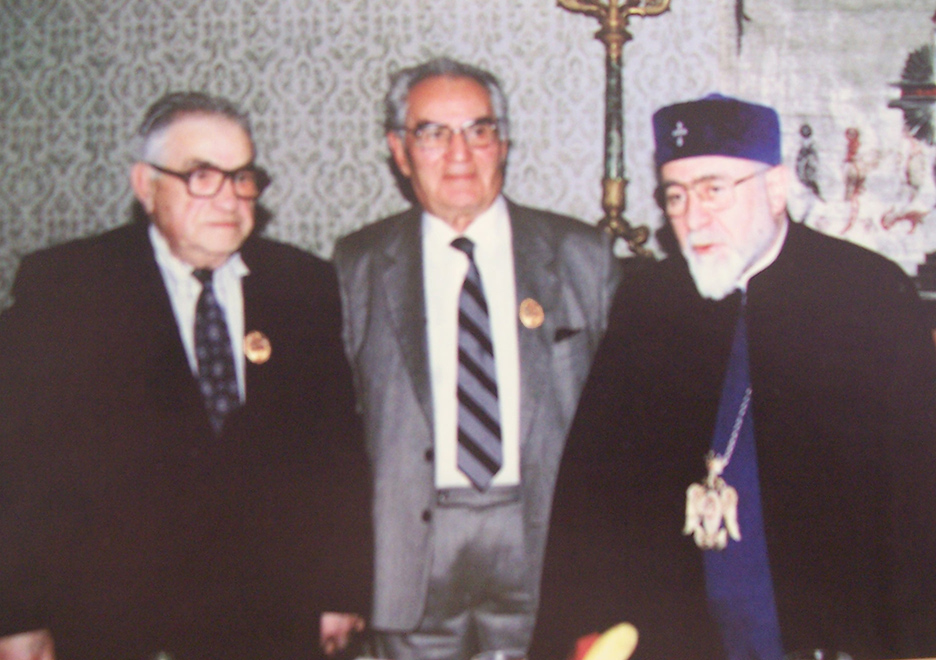
Arzoumanian and Varazdat Harutyunyan after receiving the St. Gregory the Illuminator Medal from Karekin I

Arzoumanian

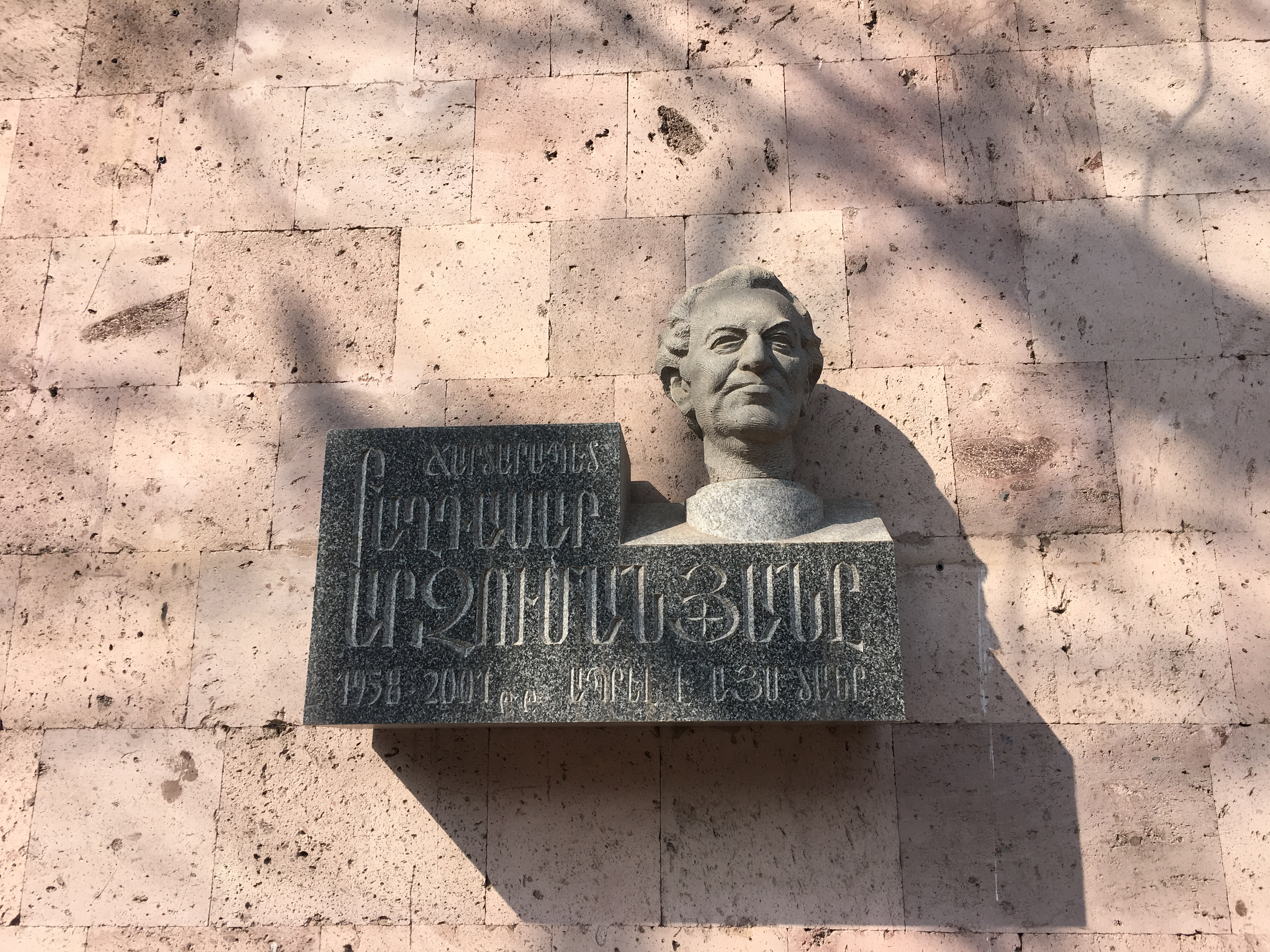
Memorial on the wall of the building where he lived from 1958-2001 (designed by Getik Baghdasaryan)

== Bibliography ==
- There are 30 bibliographical references in the book of Varazdat Harutyunyan devoted to Baghdasar Arzoumanian: Հարությունյան, Վարազդատ (2004). Նորօրյա Ոսկեձեռիկը. ճարտարապետ Բաղդասար Արզումանյանի կյանքն ու ստեղծագործական վաստակը (in Armenian). Holy Etchmiadzin: Mother See of Holy Etchmiadzin. p. 100. ISBN 99930-75-23-X..
- Harutyunyan, Varazdat (1996). Ճարտարապետ Բաղդասար Արզումանյանի ծննդյան 80-ամյակի առթիվ [For the Occasion of 80th Birthday Anniversary of Baghdasar Arzoumanian] (in Armenian). Etchmiadzin Monthly. Archived from the original on August 11, 2011.
- АВАКЯН, Светлана (August 27, 2011). ЧЕЛОВЕК КАМНЯ. Golos Armenii (in Russian). Archived from the original on March 17, 2012., Google Translation.

== Films ==
- Tadevosyan, Anahit (Author); Tatintsyan, Arpine (Director) (2006). The Skillful (Armenian: Ոսկեձեռիկը). Yerevan, Armenia: Public Television of Armenia.
- Mikayelyan, Martin; Martirosyan, Sahak (2000). The Architect (Armenian: Ճարտարապետը). Yerevan, Armenia.

== See also ==
- Academic and Architect Varazdat Harutyunyan speaking about Baghdasar Arzoumanian on YouTube (April 2007, in Armenian)
