= Mutsk =

Mutsk Մուցք
- Location within Armenia Location within Syunik Province
- Coordinates: 39°31′55″N 45°54′26″E
- Country: Armenia
- Province: Syunik
- Municipality: Sisian

Area
  - Total: 29.86 km^{2} (11.53 sq mi)

Population (2011)
  - Total: 324
  - Density: 10.9/km^{2} (28.1/sq mi)
- Time zone: UTC+4 (AMT)

Mutsk (Armenian: Մուցք) is a village in the Sisian Municipality of the Syunik Province in Armenia. The Armenian architect, Baghdasar Arzoumanian was born here in 1916.

== Toponymy ==
The village was previously known as Bardzravan and Mazra.

== Demographics ==
The National Statistical Service of the Republic of Armenia (ARMSTAT) reported its population was 375 in 2010, down from 376 at the 2001 census.
