= Norakhpyur =

Village in Shirak, Armenia

- Location within Armenia Location within Shirak
- Coordinates: 40°57′N 43°42′E
- Country: Armenia
- Marz (Province): Shirak
- Time zone: UTC+4 ( )
  - Summer (DST): UTC+5 ( )

Norakhpyur (Armenian: Նորախպյուր) is a village in the Shirak Province of Armenia.
