= Jrarrat =

Jrarrat or Jrarat or Djrarat or Dzhrarat may refer to:

- Jrarat, Armavir, Armenia
- Jrarat, Kotayk, Armenia
- Jrarat, Shirak, Armenia
