= Dashkerpi =

Village in Shirak, Armenia

- Location within Armenia Location within Shirak
- Coordinates: 40°58′N 43°46′E
- Country: Armenia
- Province: Shirak
- Time zone: UTC+4 ( )
  - Summer (DST): UTC+5 ( )

Dashkerpi is a village in the Shirak Province of Armenia.
