= Dzorashen (Maralik) =

Dzorashen Ձորաշեն
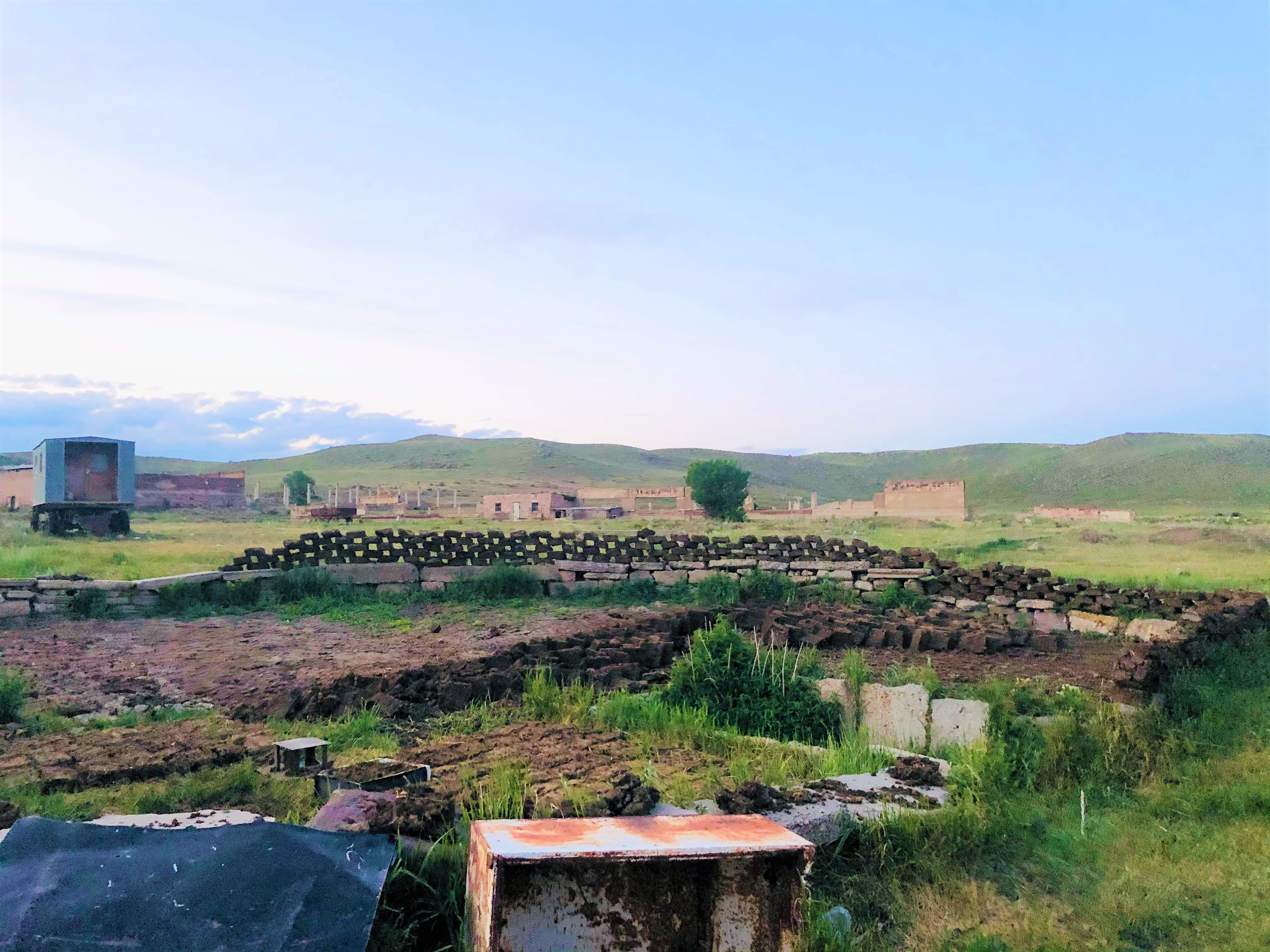

- Location within Armenia Location within Shirak
- Coordinates: 40°34′N 43°47′E
- Country: Armenia
- Marz (Province): Shirak
- Time zone: UTC+4
  - Summer (DST): UTC+5 ( )

Dzorashen (Armenian: Ձորաշեն, also, Krykh Armenian: Ղըռըխ) is a deserted town in the Shirak Province of Armenia.
