= Kapanak =

Village in Shirak, Armenia

- Location within Armenia Location within Shirak
- Coordinates: 40°46′N 43°59′E
- Country: Armenia
- Marz (Province): Shirak
- Time zone: UTC+4 ( )
  - Summer (DST): UTC+5 ( )

Kapanak is a village in the Shirak Province of Armenia.
