= Jajuravan =

Jajuravan Ջաջուռավան
- Location within Armenia Location within Shirak
- Coordinates: 40°52′30″N 43°57′00″E
- Country: Armenia
- Province: Shirak
- Municipality: Akhuryan

Population (2011)
  - Total: 176
- Time zone: UTC+4

Jajuravan (Armenian: Ջաջուռավան) is a village in the Akhuryan Municipality of the Shirak Province of Armenia.

== Demographics ==
Historical population
Year	Pop.	±% p.a.
1897	9	—
1926	46	+5.79%
1939	99	+6.07%
1959	113	+0.66%
1970	422	+12.73%
1979	393	−0.79%
1989	136	−10.07%
2001	307	+7.02%
2011	176	−5.41%
