= Sarapat =

Place in Shirak, Armenia

Sarapat Սարապատ
- Location within Armenia Location within Shirak
- Coordinates: 40°56′17″N 44°02′28″E
- Country: Armenia
- Province: Shirak
- Municipality: Ashotsk

Population (2011)
  - Total: 109
- Time zone: UTC+4
  - Summer (DST): UTC+5

Sarapat (Armenian: Սարապատ) is a village in the Ashotsk Municipality of the Shirak Province of Armenia.

== Demographics ==
Historical population
Year	Pop.	±% p.a.
1873	165	—
1897	282	+2.26%
1926	242	−0.53%
1939	348	+2.83%
1959	158	−3.87%
1970	228	+3.39%
1979	170	−3.21%
1989	67	−8.89%
2001	148	+6.83%
2011	109	−3.01%
