= Saratak =

Village in Shirak, Armenia

Saratak Սարատակ
- Location within Armenia Location within Shirak
- Coordinates: 40°40′12″N 43°51′59″E
- Country: Armenia
- Province: Shirak
- Municipality: Artik

Population (2011)
  - Total: 1,321
- Time zone: UTC+4

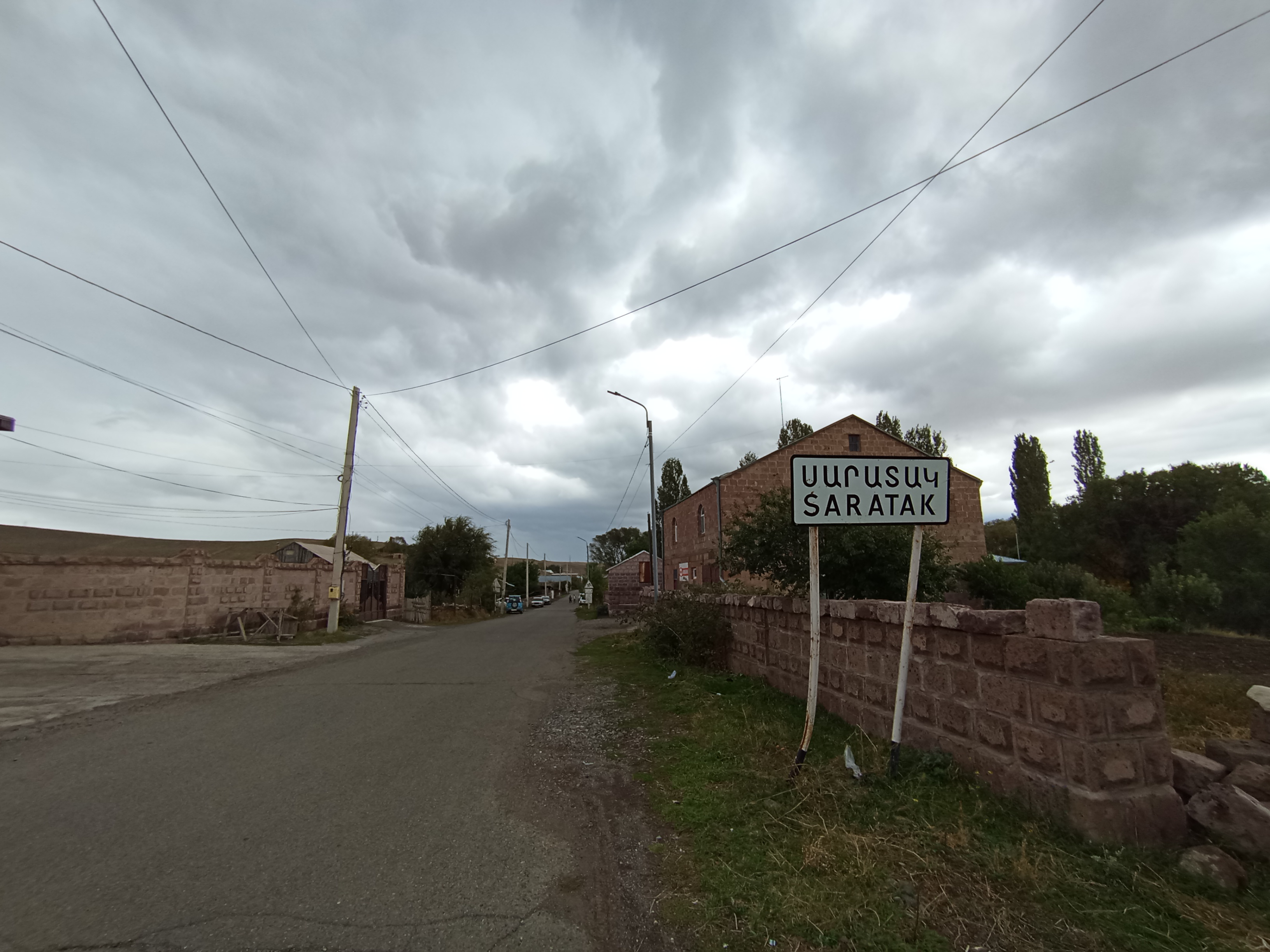
Saratak village in Sirak region

Saratak (Armenian: Սարատակ) is a village in the Artik Municipality of the Shirak Province of Armenia.

== Demographics ==
Historical population
Year	Pop.	±% p.a.
1831	191	—
1873	565	+2.62%
1897	878	+1.85%
1926	923	+0.17%
1939	1,112	+1.44%
1959	1,062	−0.23%
1970	1,181	+0.97%
1979	1,142	−0.37%
1989	1,429	+2.27%
2001	1,274	−0.95%
2011	1,321	+0.36%
