= Haykasar =

Village in Shirak, Armenia

Haykasar Հայկասար
- Location within Armenia Location within Shirak
- Coordinates: 40°36′N 43°53′E
- Country: Armenia
- Province: Shirak
- Municipality: Artik

Population (2011)
  - Total: 220
- Time zone: UTC+4
  - Summer (DST): UTC+5

Haykasar (Armenian: Հայկասար) is a village in the Artik Municipality of the Shirak Province of Armenia.

== Demographics ==
The population of the village since 1831 is as follows:

Historical population
Year	Pop.	±% p.a.
1831	41	—
1897	333	+3.22%
1926	396	+0.60%
1939	343	−1.10%
1959	209	−2.45%
1970	228	+0.79%
1979	199	−1.50%
2001	249	+1.02%
2011	220	−1.23%
