= Aravet =

Aravet Արավետ
- Location within Armenia Location within Shirak
- Coordinates: 41°02′48″N 43°46′37″E
- Country: Armenia
- Province: Shirak
- Municipality: Amasia
- Time zone: UTC+4

Aravet (Armenian: Արավետ) is an abandoned village in the Amasia Municipality of the Shirak Province of Armenia. It was listed as uninhabited in the 2001 census.

== Population ==
The population of the village since 1886 is as follows:

Historical population
| Year | Pop. | ±% p.a. |
|---|---|---|
| 1886 | 137 | — |
| 1897 | 206 | +3.78% |
| 1926 | 160 | −0.87% |
| 1939 | 261 | +3.84% |
| 1959 | 283 | +0.41% |
| 1970 | 507 | +5.44% |
| 1979 | 547 | +0.85% |
| 1989 | 250 | −7.53% |
