= Lernut =

Lernut Լեռնուտ
- Location within Armenia Location within Shirak
- Coordinates: 40°52′N 43°55′E
- Country: Armenia
- Province: Shirak
- Municipality: Akhuryan

Population (2011)
  - Total: 134
- Time zone: UTC+4
  - Summer (DST): UTC+5

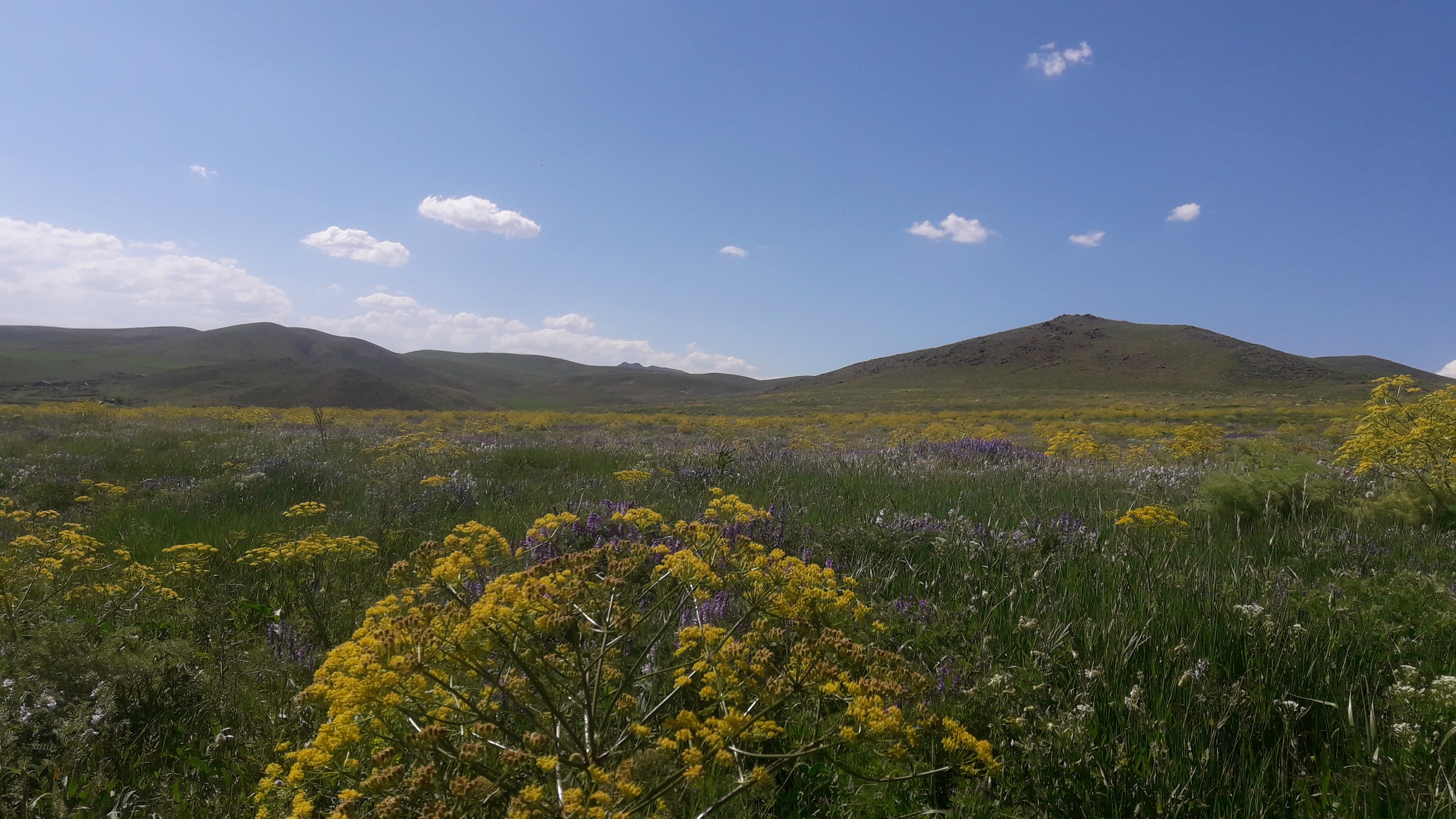
The landscape around Lernut

Lernut (Armenian: Լեռնուտ) is a village in the Akhuryan Municipality of the Shirak Province of Armenia.

== Demographics ==
Historical population
Year	Pop.	±% p.a.
1831	221	—
1897	592	+1.50%
1926	299	−2.33%
1939	374	+1.74%
1959	186	−3.43%
1970	175	−0.55%
1979	113	−4.74%
2001	181	+2.16%
2011	134	−2.96%
