= Dzorashen =

Dzorashen Ձորաշեն
- Location within Armenia Location within Shirak
- Coordinates: 40°55′53″N 44°04′09″E
- Country: Armenia
- Province: Shirak
- Municipality: Ashotsk
- Elevation: 1,970 m (6,460 ft)

Population (2011)
  - Total: 187
- Time zone: UTC+4
  - Summer (DST): UTC+5

Dzorashen (Armenian: Ձորաշեն) is a village in the Ashotsk Municipality of the Shirak Province of Armenia.

== Demographics ==
Historical population
Year	Pop.	±% p.a.
1831	323	—
1897	712	+1.20%
1926	764	+0.24%
1959	295	−2.84%
1970	336	+1.19%
1979	304	−1.11%
2001	256	−0.78%
2011	187	−3.09%
