= Saragyugh =

Saragyugh Սարագյուղ
- Location within Armenia Location within Shirak
- Coordinates: 41°08′41″N 43°50′12″E
- Country: Armenia
- Province: Shirak
- Municipality: Ashotsk

Population (2011)
  - Total: 174
- Time zone: UTC+4
  - Summer (DST): UTC+5

Saragyugh (Armenian: Սարագյուղ) is a village in the Ashotsk Municipality of the Shirak Province of Armenia.

== Demographics ==
The population of the village since 1873 is as follows:

Historical population
Year	Pop.	±% p.a.
1873	135	—
1897	266	+2.87%
1926	378	+1.22%
1931	468	+4.36%
1939	579	+2.70%
1959	320	−2.92%
1979	287	−0.54%
1989	208	−3.17%
2001	192	−0.66%
2011	174	−0.98%
