= Hovtashen, Shirak =

Village in Shirak, Armenia

Hovtashen Հովտաշեն
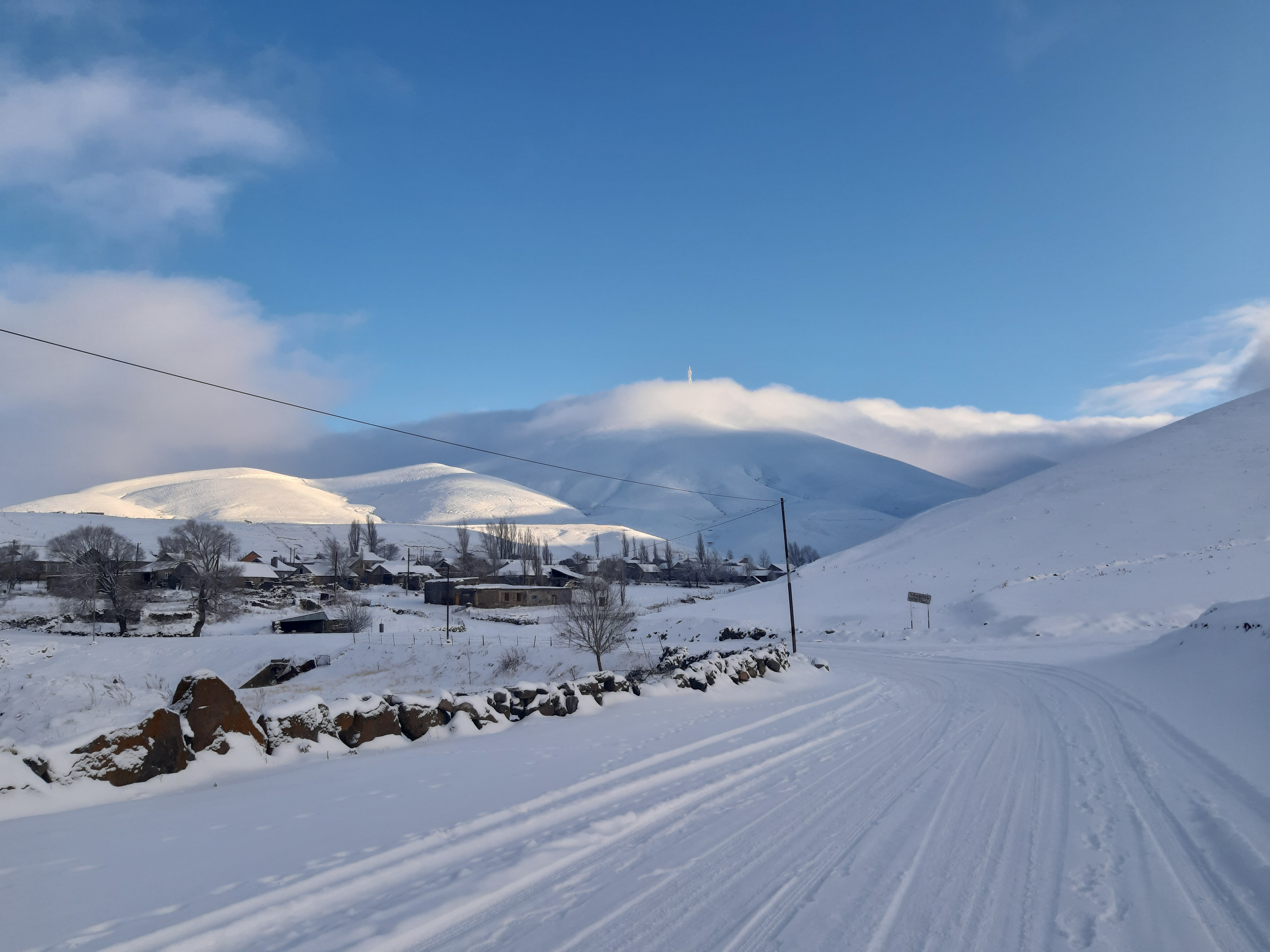

- Location within Armenia Location within Shirak
- Coordinates: 40°40′N 43°54′E
- Country: Armenia
- Province: Shirak
- Municipality: Artik

Population (2011)
  - Total: 294
- Time zone: UTC+4
  - Summer (DST): UTC+5

Hovtashen (Armenian: Հովտաշեն) is a village in the Artik Municipality of the Shirak Province of Armenia.

== Demographics ==
Historical population
Year	Pop.	±% p.a.
1831	37	—
1897	192	+2.53%
1926	255	+0.98%
1939	275	+0.58%
1959	213	−1.27%
1970	251	+1.50%
1979	238	−0.59%
2001	321	+1.37%
2011	294	−0.87%
