= Akhuryan kayaran =

Akhuryan kayaran Ախուրյան կայարանի
- Location within Armenia Location within Shirak
- Coordinates: 40.746111°N 43.796944°E
- Country: Armenia
- Province: Shirak
- Municipality: Akhuryan

Population (2011)
  - Total: 0
- Time zone: UTC+4

Akhuryan kayaran (Armenian: Ախուրյան կայարանի գյուղ) is an abandoned village in the Akhuryan Municipality of the Shirak Province of Armenia.

== Demographics ==
Historical population
| Year | Pop. | ±% p.a. |
|---|---|---|
| 1926 | 17 | — |
| 1939 | 29 | +4.19% |
| 1979 | 28 | −0.09% |
