= Jrarat, Shirak =

Village in Shirak, Armenia

Jrarat Ջրառատ
- Location within Armenia Location within Shirak
- Coordinates: 40°44′46″N 44°05′18″E
- Country: Armenia
- Province: Shirak
- Municipality: Akhuryan

Population (2011)
  - Total: 1,156
- Time zone: UTC+4
  - Summer (DST): UTC+5

Jrarat (Armenian: Ջրառատ) is a village in the Akhuryan Municipality of the Shirak Province of Armenia. The village contains a ruined 6th-century church.

== Demographics ==
Historical population
Year	Pop.	±% p.a.
1831	1,283	—
1897	1,281	−0.00%
1926	1,420	+0.36%
1939	1,424	+0.02%
1959	1,026	−1.63%
1970	1,212	+1.53%
1979	1,061	−1.47%
1989	829	−2.44%
2001	1,147	+2.74%
2011	1,156	+0.08%
