= Shirak Province =

Province of Armenia

Shirak Շիրակ
- Province
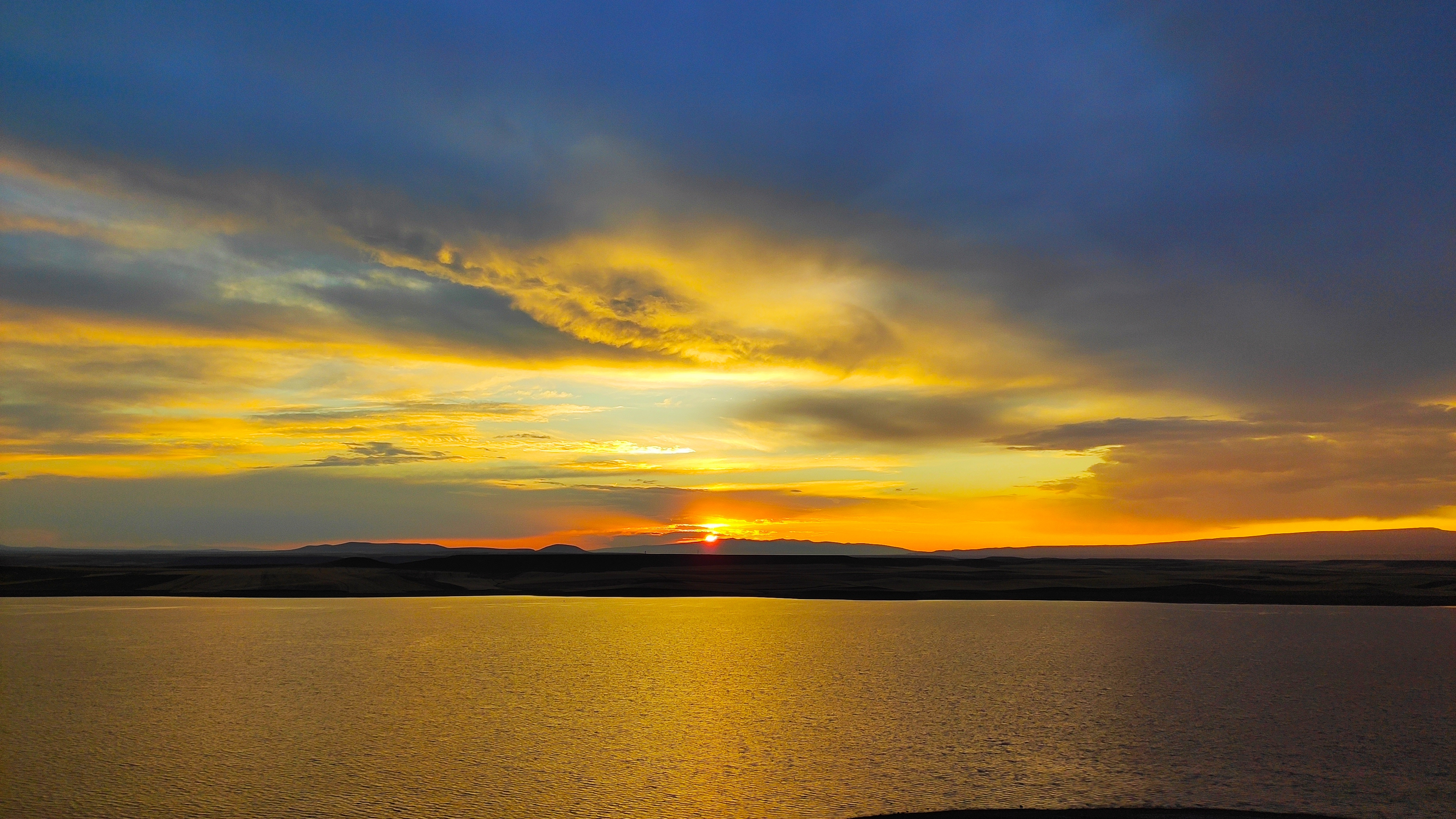
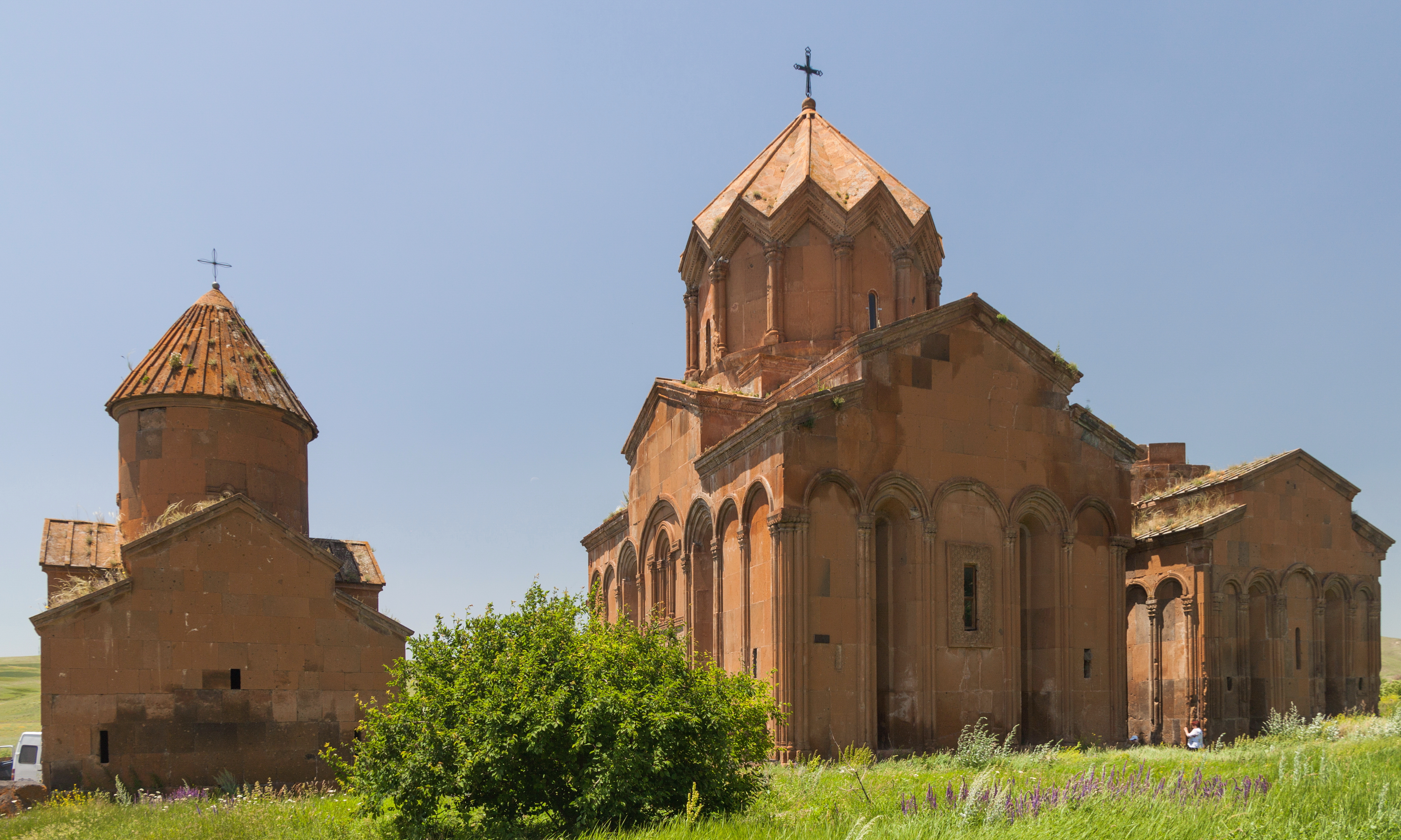
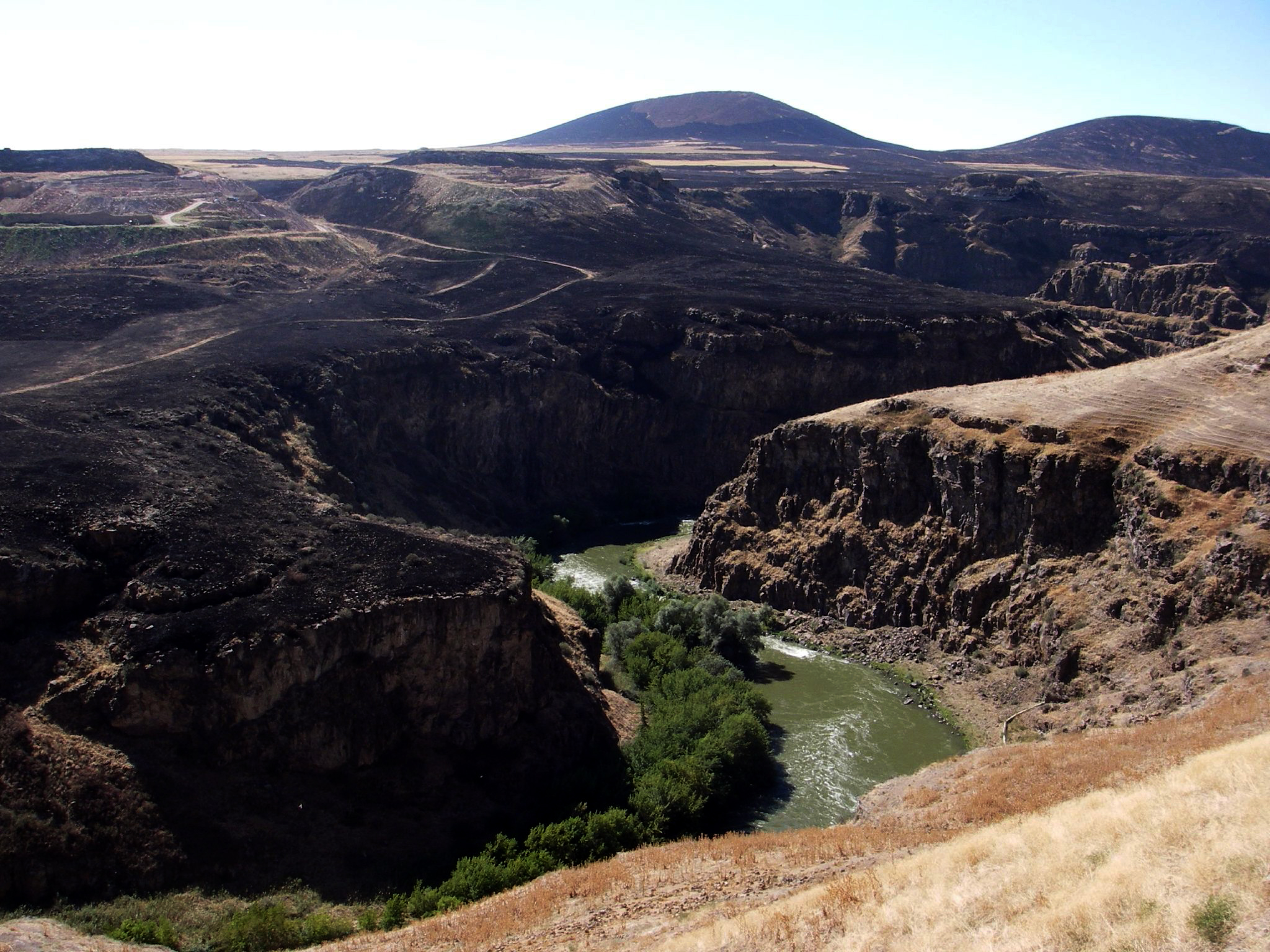
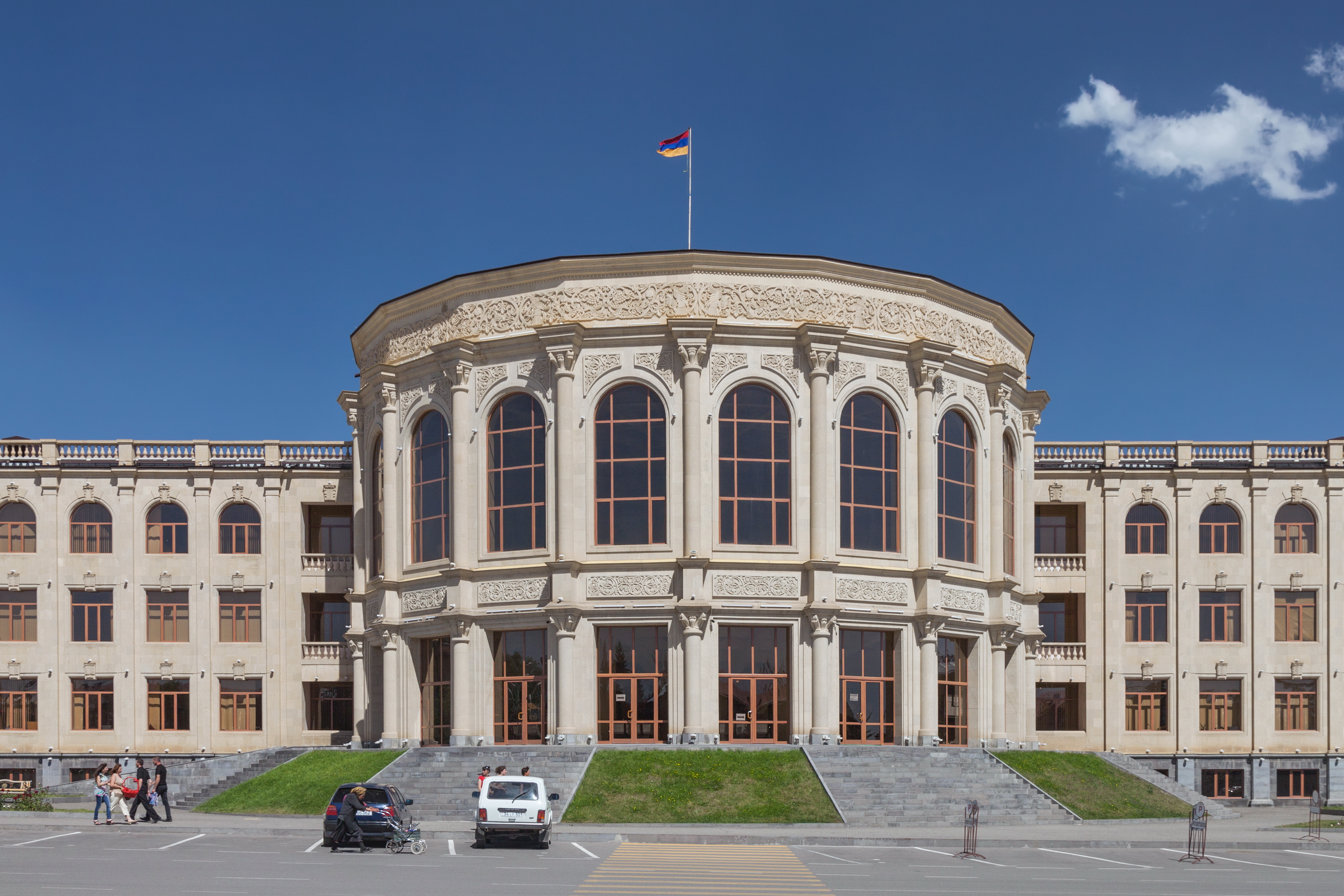
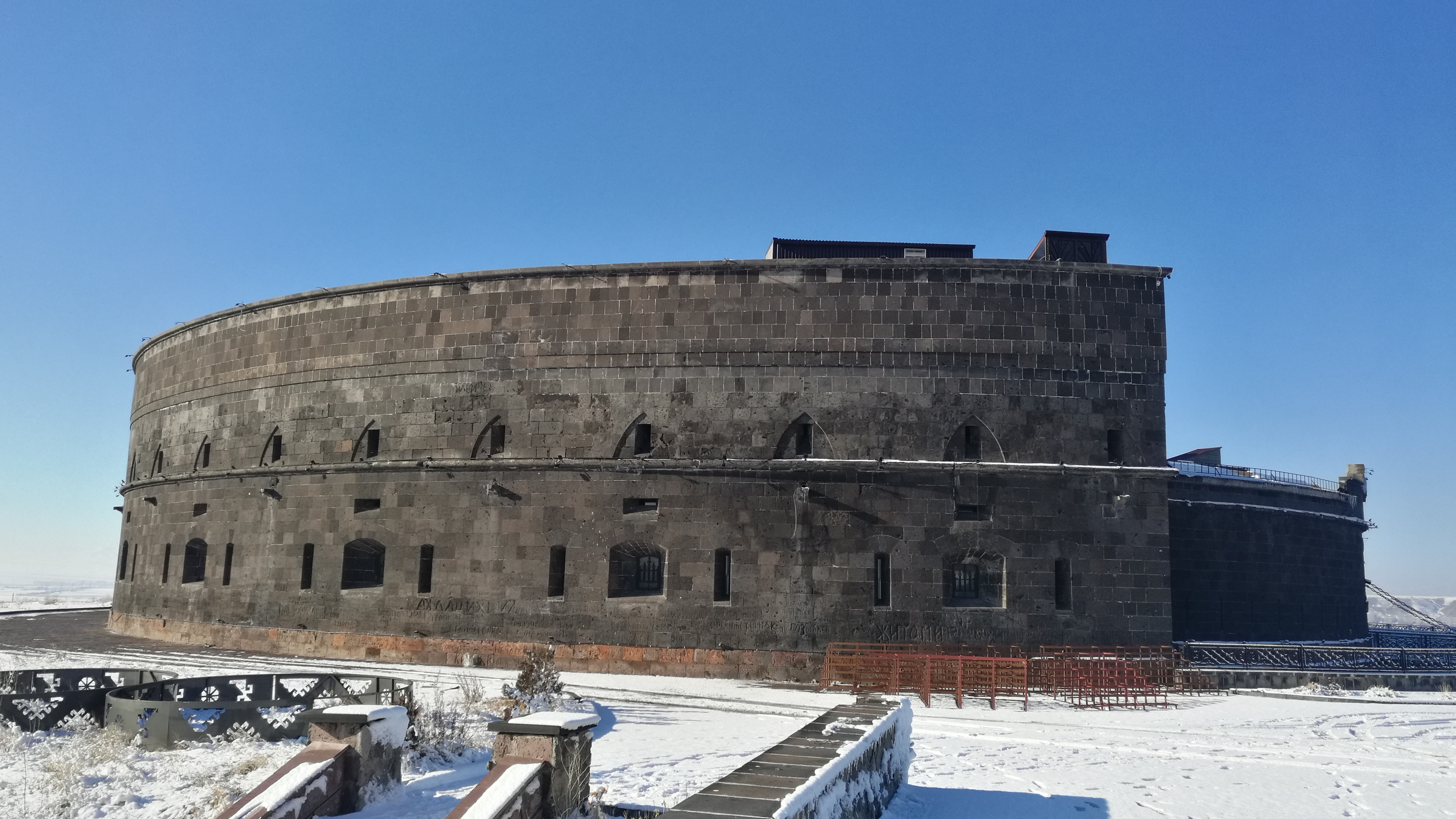
- From the top to bottom-right: Akhurian Reservoir, Marmashen Monastery, Akhuryan River Gorge, Gyumri City Hall, Sev Berd

- Location of Shirak within Armenia
- Coordinates: 40°50′N 43°55′E
- Country: Armenia
- Capital and largest city: Gyumri

Government
  - Governor: Mushegh Muradyan

Area
  - Total: 2,680 km^{2} (1,030 sq mi)
  - Rank: 6th

Population (2022)
  - Total: 235,484
  - Rank: 5th
  - Density: 87.9/km^{2} (228/sq mi)

GDP
  - Total: ֏ 238.001 billion (US$ 493 million)
  - Per capita: ֏ 1,002,954 (US$ 2,079)
- Time zone: AMT (UTC+04)
- Postal code: 2601–3126
- ISO 3166 code: AM-SH
- FIPS 10-4: AM07
- HDI (2022): 0.782 high · 3rd
- Website: Official website

Shirak (Armenian: Շիրակ, Armenian pronunciation: [ʃiˈɾɑk]) is a province (marz) of Armenia. It is located in the north-west of the country, bordering the provinces of Lori to the east and Aragatsotn to the south and southeast, and the countries of Turkey to the west and Georgia to the north. Its capital and largest city is Gyumri, which is the second largest city in Armenia. It is as much semi-desert as it is mountain meadow or high alpine. In the south, the high steppes merge into mountain terrain, being verdant green in the spring, with hues of reddish brown in the summer. The province is served by the Shirak International Airport of Gyumri.

== Etymology ==
Shirak Province is named after the Shirak canton of the historical Ayrarat province of Ancient Armenia. The early medieval Armenian historian Movses Khorenatsi writes that the name Shirak derives from Shara, who was the great-grandson of Hayk, the legendary patriarch and founder of the Armenian nation. Modern scholars connect Shirak with the name of the Siraces (Sirakenoi, Σιρακινοί in greek), a North Caucasian people who may have settled in Shirak and given it its name. According to another view, Shirak derives from Eriakhi/Eriaḫe, which is the name given to the region in a cuneiform inscription of the Urartian king Argishti I.

== Geography ==
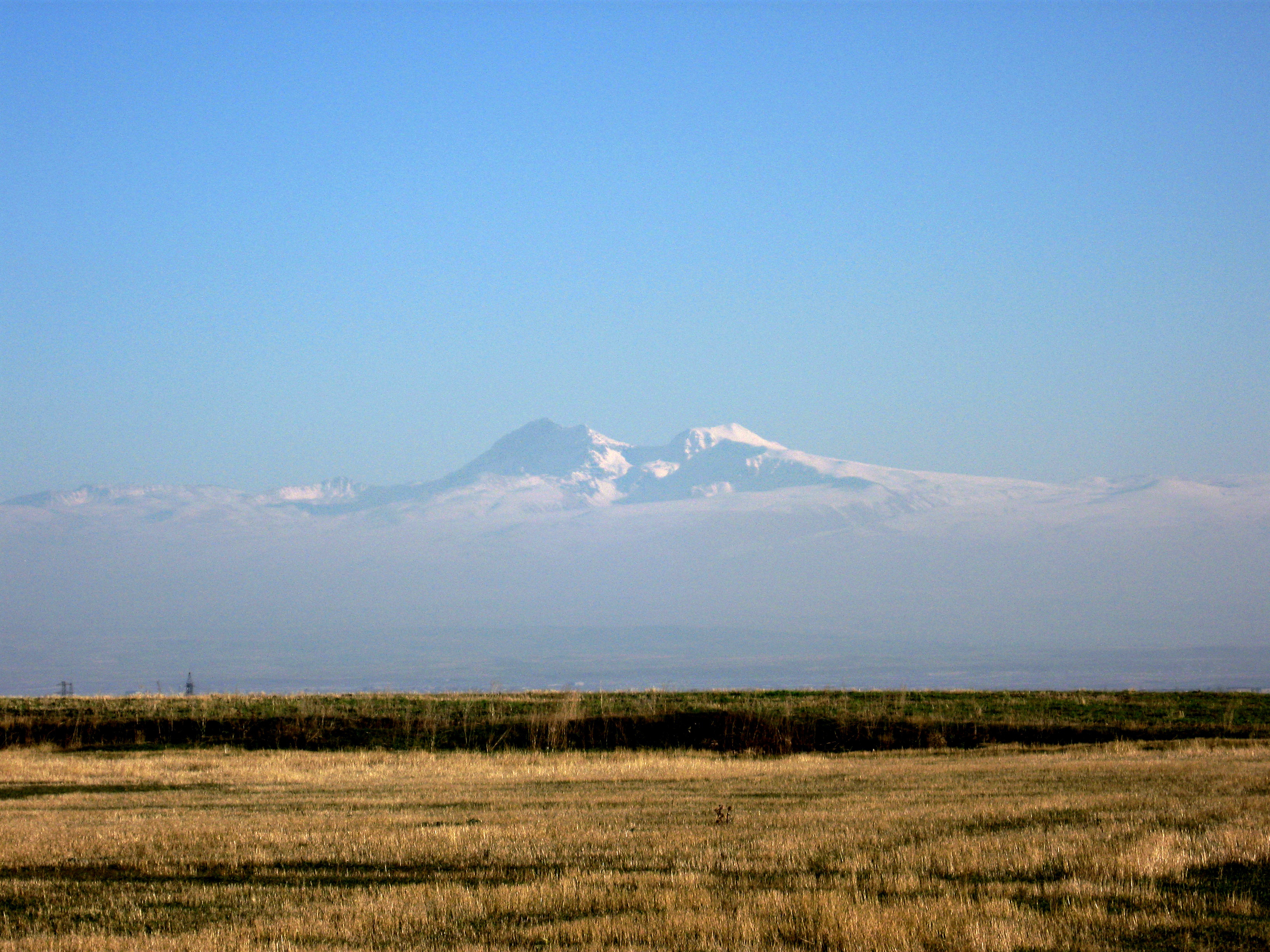
Shirak Plain

Shirak Province is located in the north-west of Armenia and covers an area of 2,680 km^{2} (1,035 sq mi) (9% of the total area of Armenia). It borders Lori Province to the east, Aragatsotn Province to the south, the Kars and Ardahan provinces of Turkey to the west and the Samtskhe-Javakheti and Kvemo Kartli regions of Georgia to the north.

Historically, the current territory of the province mainly occupies the Shirak canton of Ayrarat province of Ancient Armenia.

Shirak is mainly dominated by the Ashotsk Plateau (1900 to 2100 meters height) in the north and the Shirak Plain (1400 to 1800 meters height) in the centre and south of the province. The vast plains of the province are surrounded with the Bazum and Pambak mountains from the east, Javakheti Range and Yeghnakhagh mountains from the north and the Aragats mass from the south. Akhurian River at the east, separates Shirak from the Kars Province of Turkey.

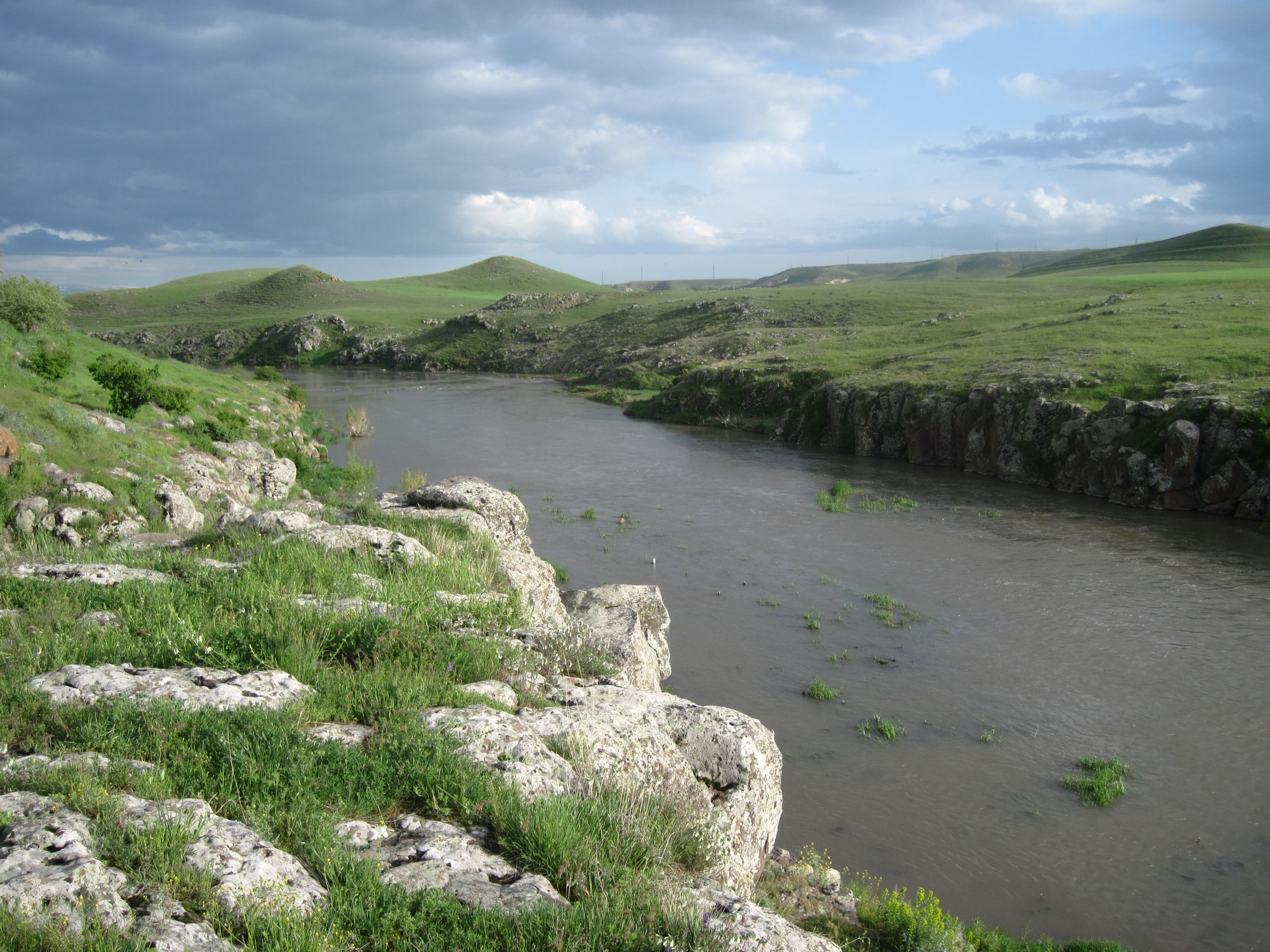
Akhurian River

The Akhurian River with its reservoir is the main water resource in the province. Lake Arpi at the northwest of Shirak is the only lake of the province. The area is protected by the government as the Lake Arpi National Park.

Shirak is rich with tufa, pumice and limestone.

=== Climate ===
Shirak is the coldest province of Armenia, with the air temperature sometimes reaching under -30 °C in the Shirak Plain and -46 °C on the Ashotsk Plateau. The climate is characterized by extremely cold, snowy winters and mild summers. Precipitation is abundant, with the annual precipitation level reaching up to 700 mm (28 in). In the northern part of the province, winters are long (7 to 8 months) and snow coverage can reach up to a meter.

== History ==
=== Classical antiquity and Urartu period ===
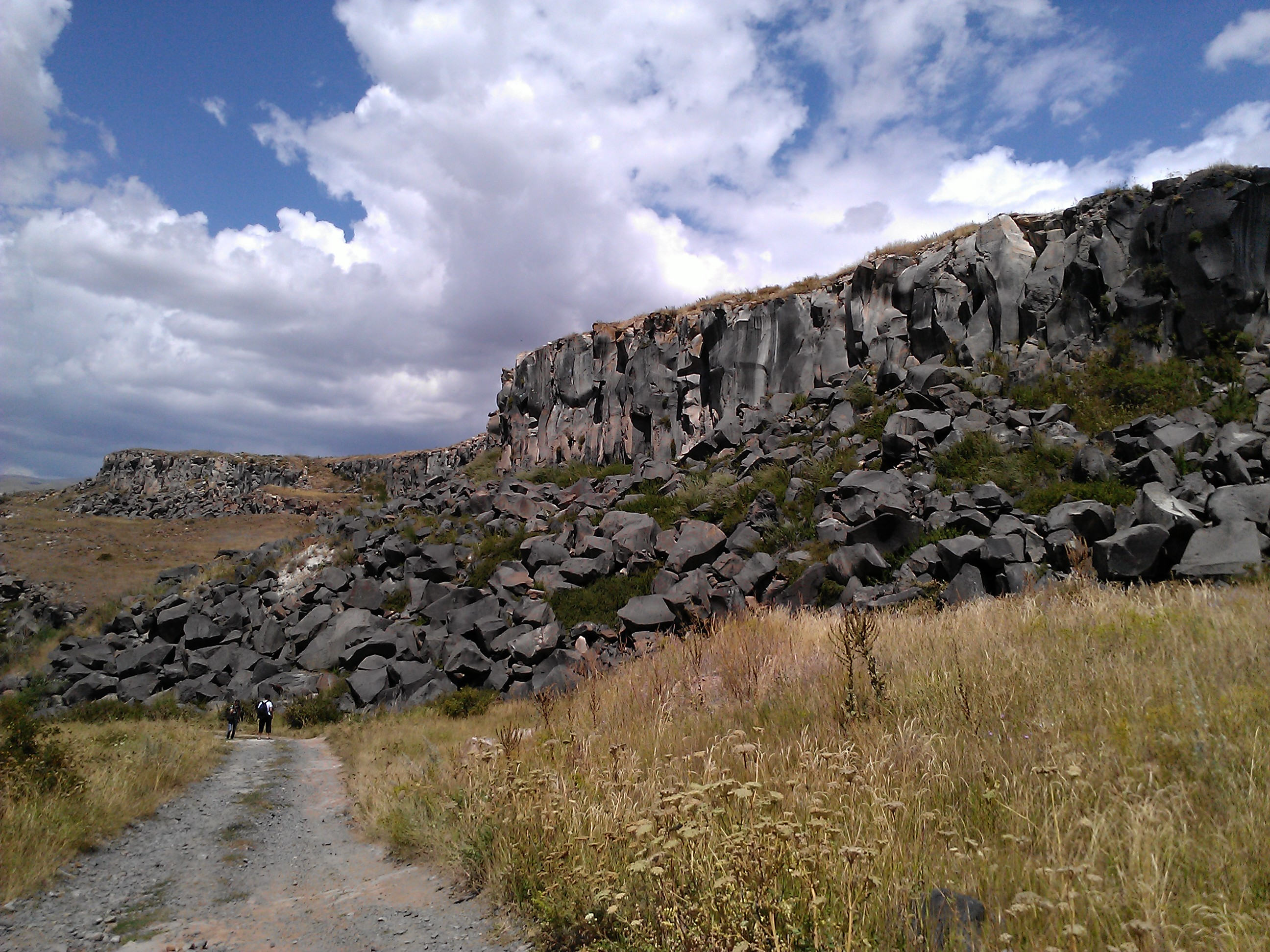
Vahramaberd fortress, 8th c. BC

Many ancient human settlements have been found in the Akhurian valley dating back to around 9000 BC. The territory of Shirak has been settled since the early Stone Age. At the higher areas that are above 2000 meters, many remains have been found from the early Bronze Age. Other remains from the 2nd millennium BC, revealed that a civilization was founded between the 20th and 12th centuries BC. With the start of the Iron Age during the 12th century BC, relations among the various ethnic groups of Armenian Highland were developed. Soon after the establishment of the Urartu Kingdom of Van at the end of the 9th century BC, Shirak became part of the kingdom. Two cuneiform inscriptions have been found in Shirak left by King Argishti I (r. 786 – 764 BC) of Urartu, where he wrote about the invasion of the land of Eriakhi (the name that Shirak is derived from, according to many historians). According to the inscriptions, the region was home to a well developed civilization based on agriculture and cattle-breeding.

in 720 BC, the Cimmerians conquered the region and probably founded the Kumayri settlement (now Gyumri), which bears a phonetic resemblance to the word used by ancient Armenian in reference to Cimmerians. Historians believe that Xenophon passed through the territories of Shirak during his return to the Black Sea, a journey immortalized in his Anabasis.

=== Achaemenids and the ancient Armenian Kingdom ===
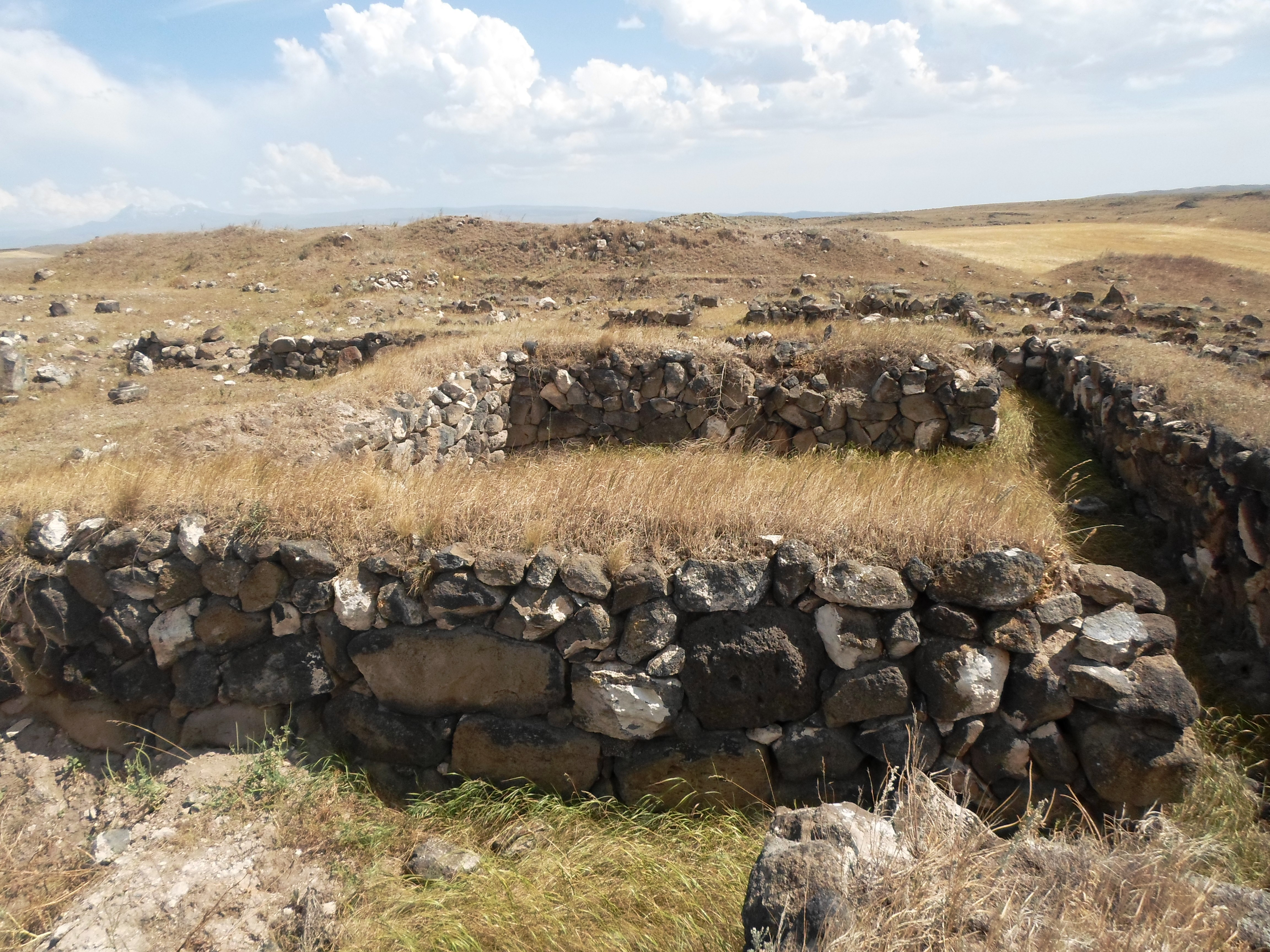
Orontid settlement of the 5th-2nd centuries BC

By the second half of the 6th century BC, Shirak became part of the Achaemenid Empire. The remains of a royal settlement found near the village of Beniamin dating back to the 5th to 2nd centuries BC, are an example of the Achemenid influence in the region. By the beginning of the 5th century BC, Shirak became part of the Satrapy of Armenia under the rule of the Orontids. Later in 331 BC, the entire territory was included in the Ayrarat province of Ancient Armenian Kingdom as part of the Shirak canton.

During the 1st century AD, Shirak was granted to the Kamsarakan family, who ruled the region during the Arsacid Kingdom of Armenia.

=== Sasanians and Bagratid Kingdom of Armenia ===
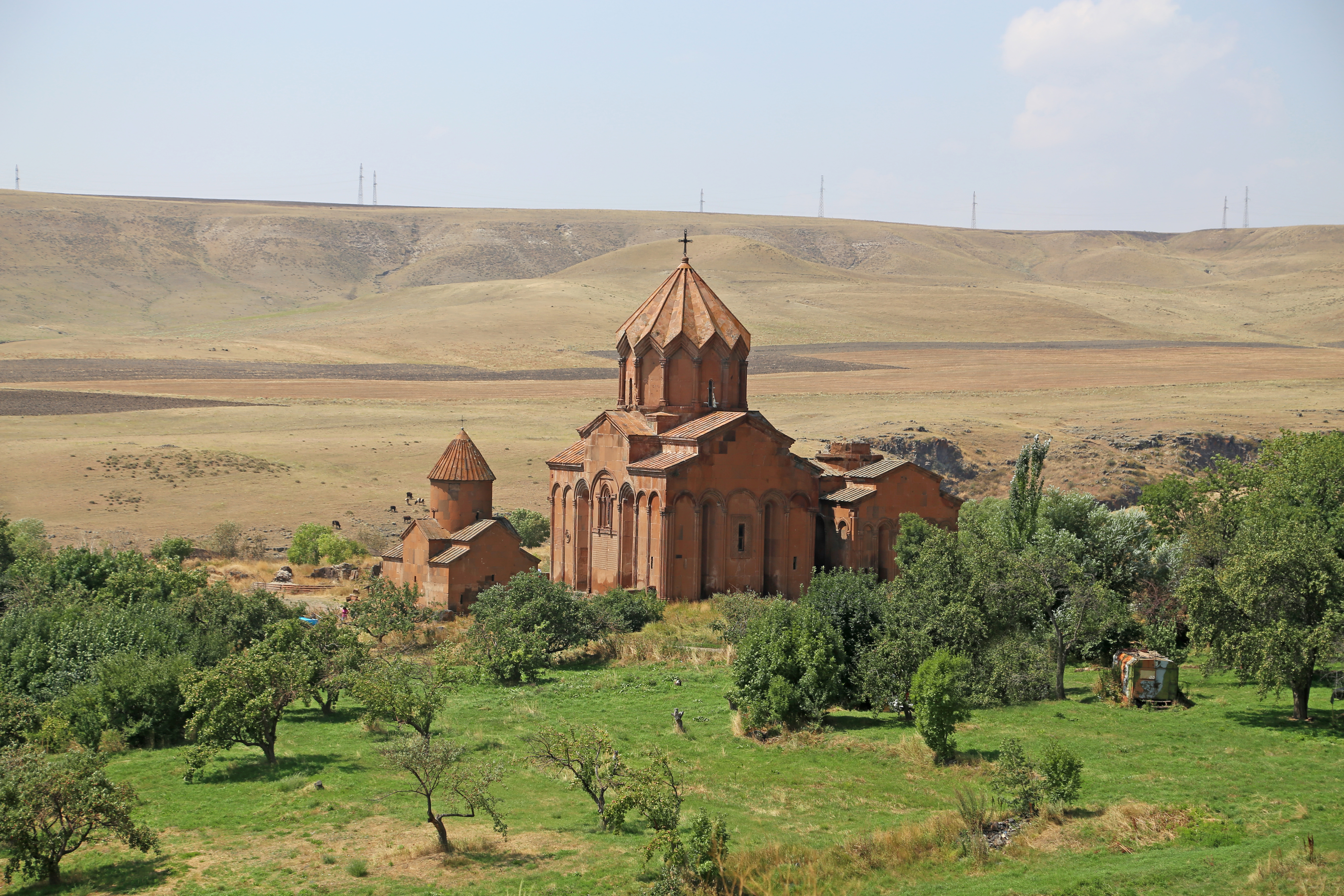
Marmashen Monastery

Following the partition of Armenia in 387 AD between the Byzantines and the Persians, and as a result of the fall of the Arsacid Kingdom of Armenia in 428, the region of Shirak became part of the Sasanian Empire of Persia.

However, Shirak is home to many early examples of the Armenian church architecture dating back to the 5th century, including the Yererouk, the Saint Mariné Church of Artik, and the Hokevank Monastery.

In 658 AD, during the height of the Arab Islamic invasions, Shirak -along with the rest of the Armenian territories- was conquered during the Muslim conquest of Persia, as it was part of Persian-ruled Armenia. It became part of the Emirate of Armenia under the Umayyad Caliphate. However, the Kamsarakan family continued to rule the region under the Arab Islamic rule of Armenia.

By the foundation of the Bagratid Kingdom of Armenia in 885, Shirak entered a new era of growth and progress, particularly when the city of Ani of Shirak became the capital of the kingdom in 961. By the second half of the 10th century, Shirak was under the influence of the Armenian Pahlavuni family, who were descendants of the Kamsarakans. The Pahlavunis had a great contribution in the progress of Shirak with the foundation of many fortresses, monastic complexes, educational institutions, etc. The monasteries of Khtzkonk, Harichavank, Marmashen and Horomos were among the prominent religious and educational centres of medieval Armenia.

=== Seljuk period, Zakarid Armenia and Turkmen rule ===
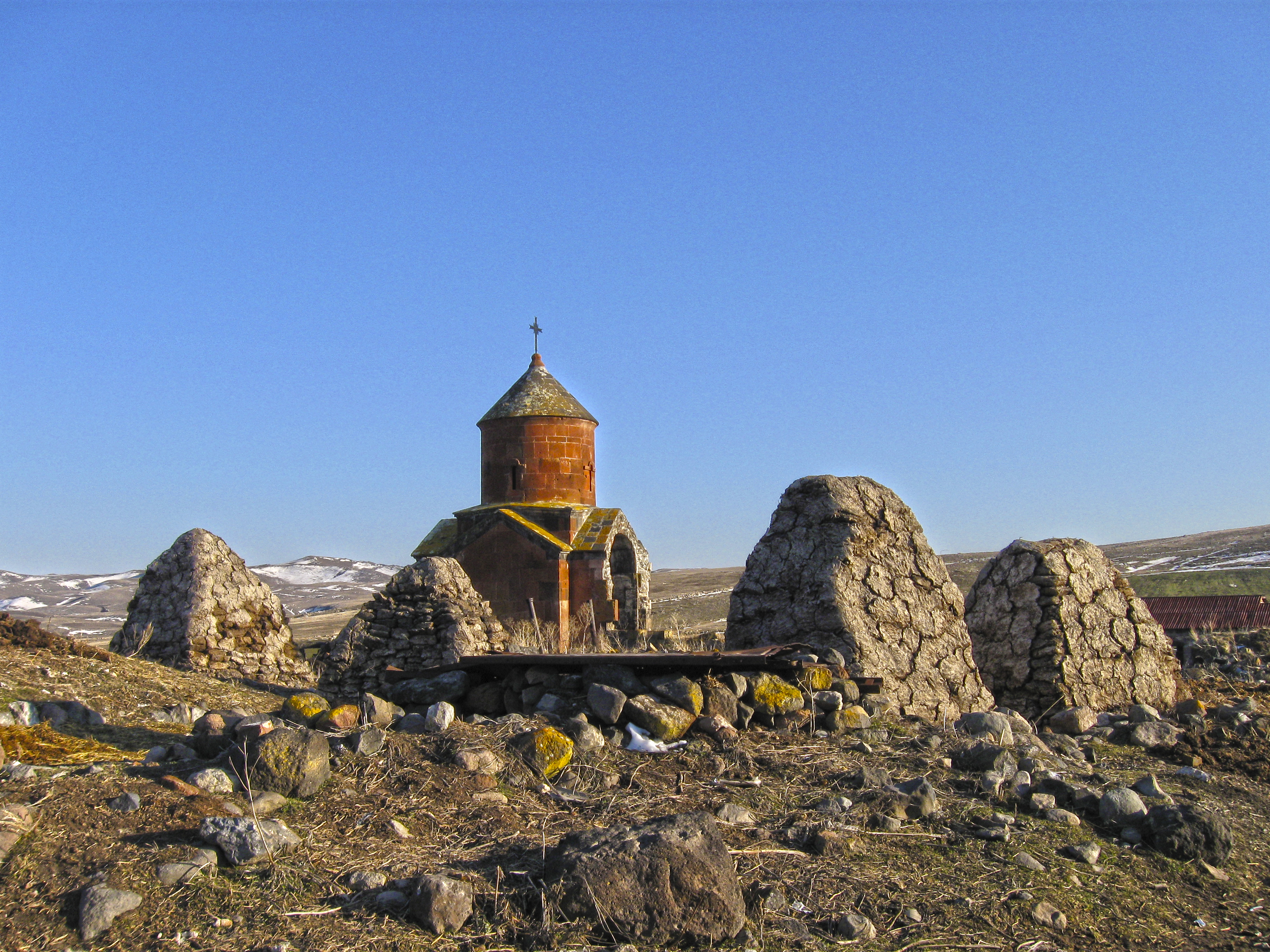
Saint Paul and Peter Church of Bardzrashen, flourished under the Zakarids

After the fall of Armenia to the Byzantine Empire in 1045 and later to the Seljuk invaders in 1064, the region entered an era of decline in all social, educational and cultural aspects.

However, with the establishment of the Zakarid Principality of Armenia in 1201 under the Georgian protectorate, the Eastern Armenian territories, mainly Lori and Shirak, entered a new period of growth and stability, becoming a trade centre between the east and the west. After the Mongols captured Ani in 1236, Armenia turned into a Mongol protectorate as part of the Ilkhanate, and the Zakarids became vassals to the Mongols. After the fall of the Ilkhanate in the mid-14th century, the Zakarid princes ruled over Lori, Shirak and Ararat plain until 1360 when they fell to the invading Turkic tribes.

By the last quarter of the 14th century, the Aq Qoyunlu Sunni Oghuz Turkic tribe took over Armenia, including Shirak. In 1400, Timur invaded Armenia and Georgia, and captured more than 60,000 of the survived local people as slaves. Many districts including Shirak were depopulated. In 1410, Armenia fell under the control of the Kara Koyunlu Shia Oghuz Turkic tribe. According to the Armenian historian Thomas of Metsoph, although the Kara Koyunlu levied heavy taxes against the Armenians, the early years of their rule were relatively peaceful and some reconstruction of towns took place.

=== Iranian and Russian rule ===
In 1501, most of the Eastern Armenian territories including Shirak were conquered by the emerging Safavid dynasty of Iran led by Shah Ismail I. Soon after in 1502, Shirak became part of the newly formed Erivan Beglarbegi, a new administrative territory of Iran formed by the Safavids. During the first half of the 18th century, Kumayri became part of the Erivan Khanate under the rule of the Afsharid dynasty and later under the Qajar dynasty of Persia.

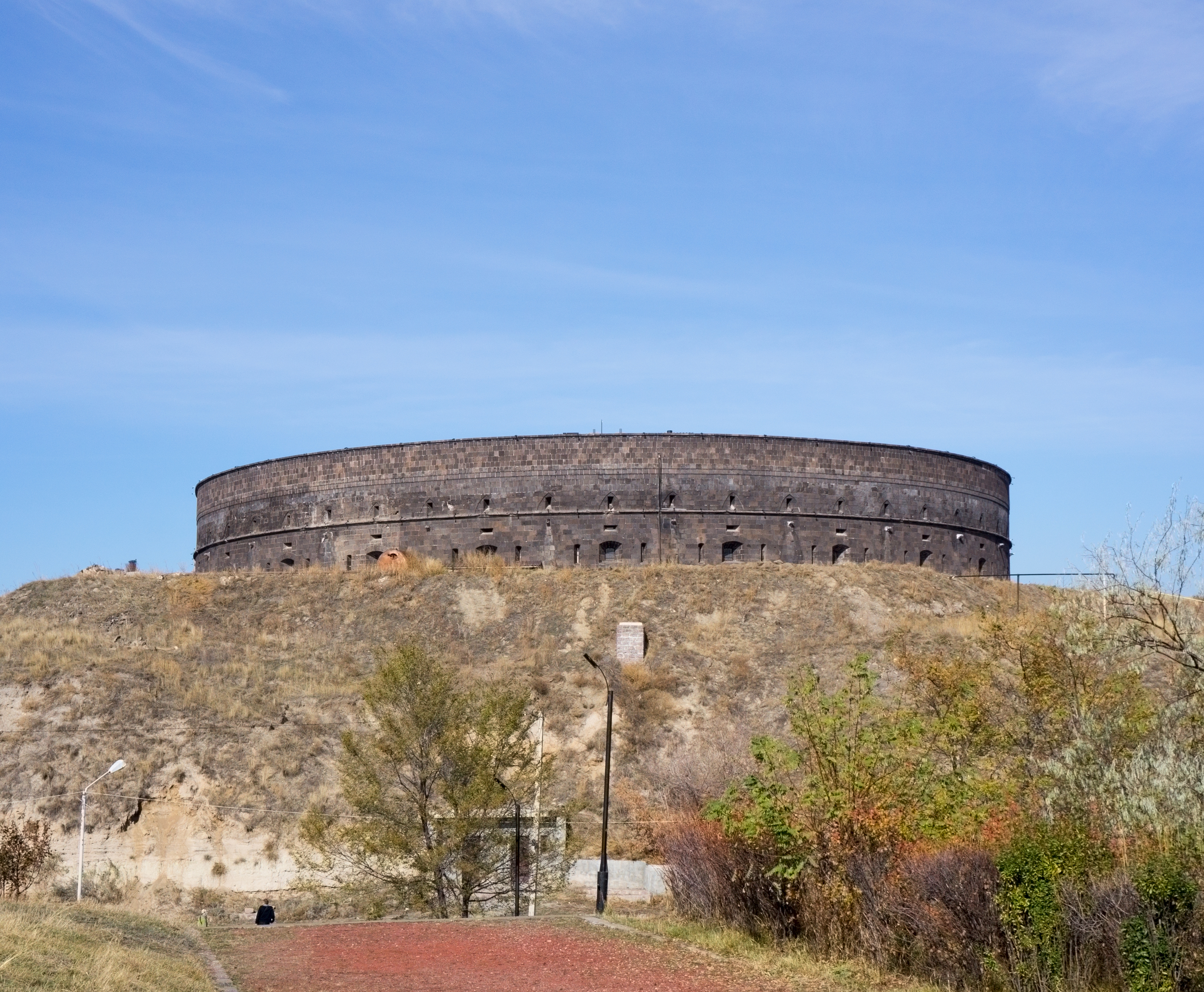
Sev Berd or the Black Fortress near Gyumri, built during the 1830s by the Russians in response to the Russo-Turkish War of 1828–1829

In June 1804, the Russian Empire took control of Shirak region at the beginning of the Russo-Persian War of 1804–1813. The region became officially part of the Russian Empire at the Treaty of Gulistan signed on 1 January 1813. During the period of the Russian rule, the region witnessed a swift growth and the town of Gyumri became one of the developing cities in Transcaucasia. In 1829, in the aftermath of the Russo-Turkish War, there was a big influx of an Armenian population, as around 3,000 families who had migrated from territories in the Ottoman Empire - in particular from the towns of Kars, Erzurum, and Doğubeyazıt- settled in Shirak. The Russian poet Alexander Pushkin visited the region during his journey to the Caucasus and eastern Turkey in 1829.

In 1837 Russian Tsar Nicholas I arrived in Shirak and re-founded the city of Gyumri as Alexandropol. The name was chosen in honour of Tsar Nicholas I's wife, Princess Charlotte of Prussia, who had changed her name to Alexandra Fyodorovna after converting to Orthodox Christianity. A major Russian fortress was built in Alexandropol in 1837. The city was completely rebuilt by 1840 to become the centre of the newly established Alexandropol Uyezd, experiencing rapid growth during its first decade. The Alexandropol Uyezd included the northern Armenian territories of Shirak, Lori and Tavush.

In 1849, the Alexandropol Uyezd became part of the Erivan Governorate, and Shirak became an important outpost for the Imperial Russian armed forces in the Transcaucasus where their military barracks were established.

During the Russo-Turkish War of 1877–78 Shirak became one of the major centres of the Russian troops. After the establishment of the railway station in Alexandropol in 1899, Shirak witnessed a significant growth as centre of trade and industry, becoming the most developed region within eastern Armenia.

=== 20th century ===
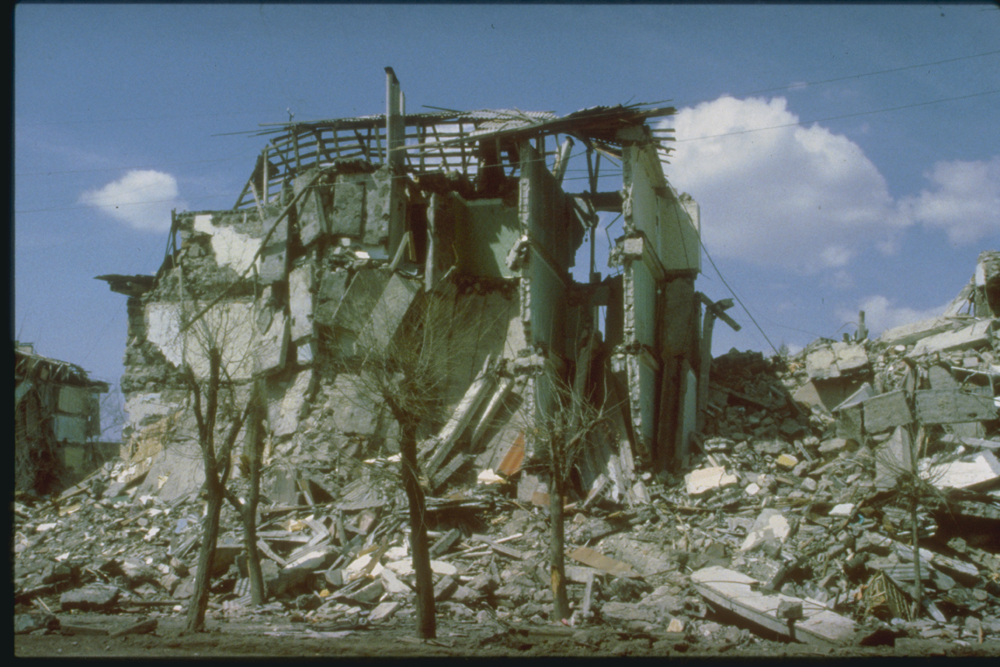
Severe damage in Leninakan as a result of the 1988 earthquake

After the October Revolution of 1917 and the Russian withdrawal from Transcaucasia, the First Republic of Armenia was proclaimed on 28 May 1918, which included Shirak. On 10 May 1920, the local Bolshevik Armenians aided by the Muslim population, attempted a coup d'état in Alexandropol against the Dashnak government of Armenia. The uprising was suppressed by the Armenian government on May 14 and its leaders were executed. However, during another Turkish invasion, Turkish troops again attacked Shirak and occupied Alexandropol on 7 November 1920. Armenia was forced to sign the Treaty of Alexandropol on December 3 to stop the Turkish advance towards Yerevan, however a concurrent Soviet invasion led to the fall of the Armenian government on December 2. The Turkish forces withdrew from Alexandropol after the Treaty of Kars was signed in October 1921 by the unrecognized Soviet and Turkish governments.

Under the Bolsheviks, Alexandropol was renamed Leninakan in 1924, after the deceased Soviet leader Vladimir Lenin. Shirak became a major industrial region within the Armenian Soviet Socialist Republic. Leninakan was the second largest city, after the capital Yerevan. However, Shirak, and particularly Leninakan, suffered major damage during the 1988 Armenian earthquake which devastated many parts of northern Armenia. The earthquake occurred along a known thrust fault with a length of 60 kilometers (37 mi). Its strike was parallel to the Caucasus range and dipped to the north-northeast.

From 1930 until 1995, modern-day Shirak was divided into 5 raions (districts) and 1 city of republican subordination within the Armenian SSR: Amasia, Ghukasyan (Ashotsk), Akhurian, Ani, Artik and the city of Leniankan. With the territorial administration reform of 1995, the 5 raions and the city of Gyumri (Leninakan) were merged to form the Shirak Province.

== Demographics ==
=== Population ===
According to the 1989 Soviet census, the districts that would later make up Shirak Province (the Amasia, Ani, Artik, Akhuryan, and Ashotsk districts) had a population of 261,217, 147,713 or 56.55% of which was urban, distributed in the cities of Artik (25,126) and Leninakan (122,587), and 113,504 or 43.45% were rural, distributed in the districts of Amasia (6,342), Ani (23,877), Artik (33,665), Akhuryan (38,952), and Ashotsk (10,668).

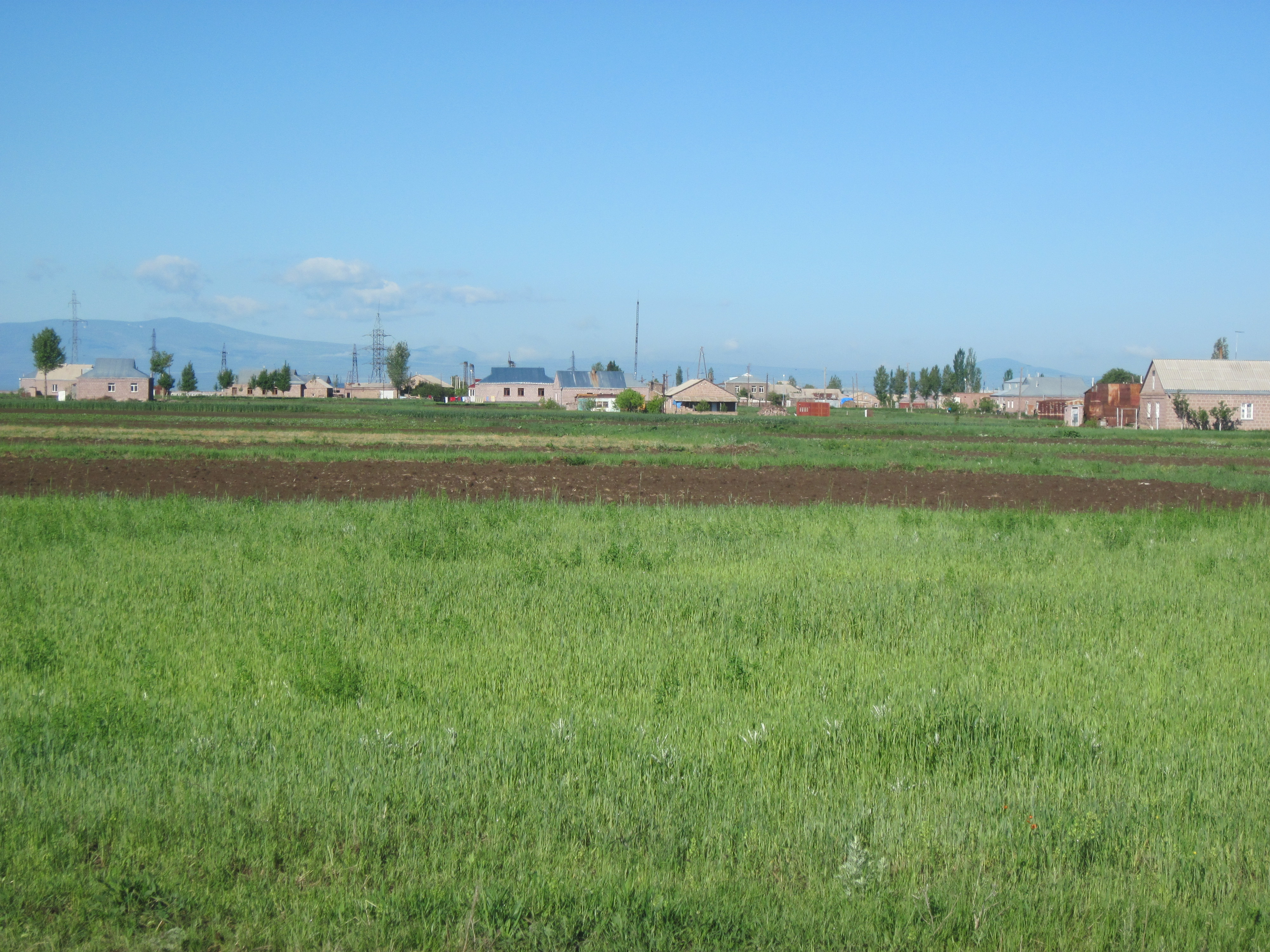
Azatan village

According to the 2011 official census, Shirak had a de jure population of 251,941 (121,615 men and 130,326 women), forming around 8.3% of the entire population of Armenia. The urban population is 146,908 (58.3%) and the rural is 105,033 (41.7%). The province has 3 urban and 116 rural communities. The largest urban community is the provincial centre of Gyumri, with a population of 121,976. The other urban centres of Artik and Maralik have a population of 19,534 and 5,398 respectively. With a population of 4,838, the village of Azatan is the largest rural municipality of Shirak.

The dialect of Armenian spoken in Shirak is a variant of the Karin dialect, closely related to Western Armenian.

=== Ethnic groups and religion ===
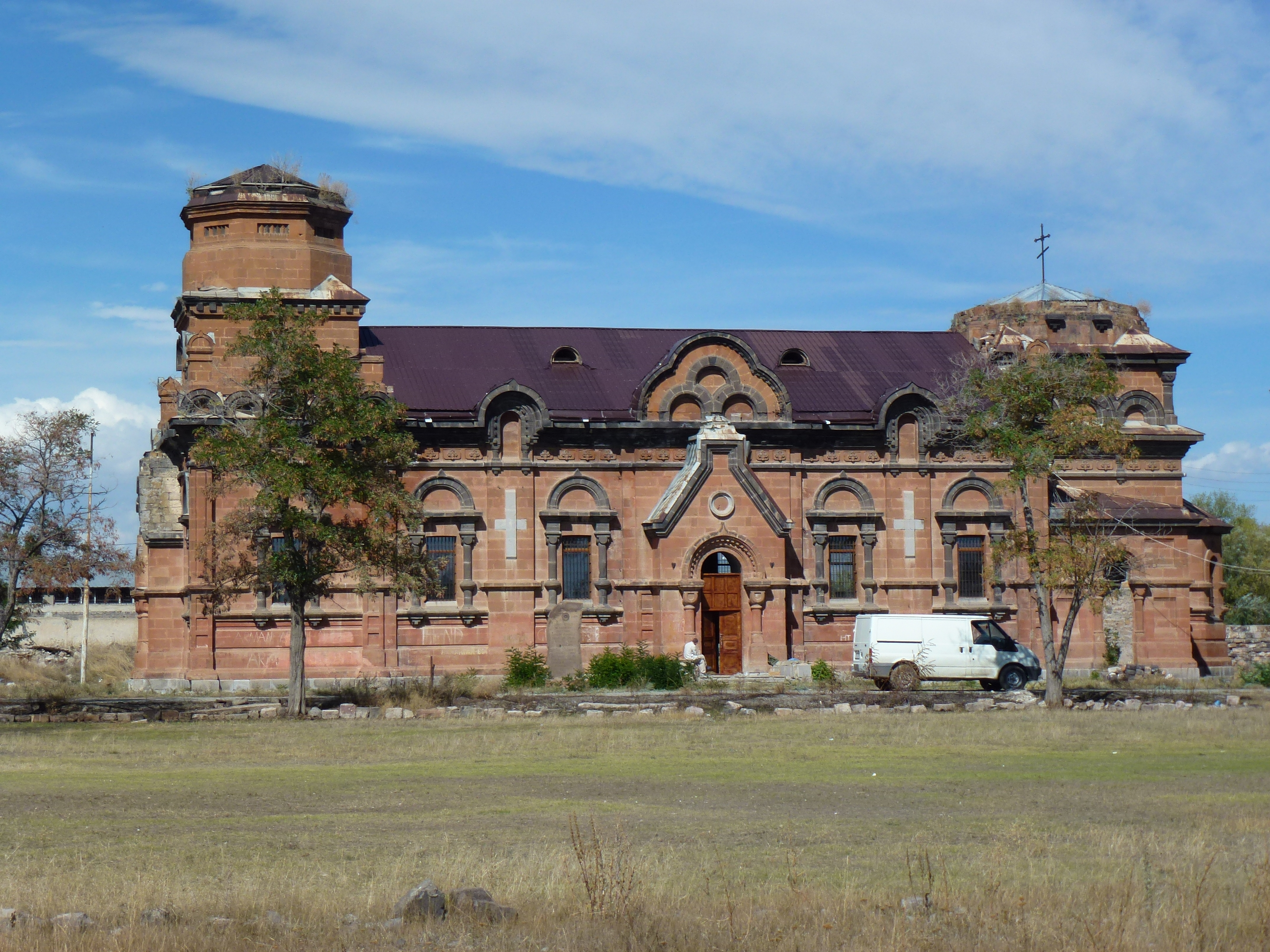
Saint Arsenije Russian Church, Gyumri

The majority of the Shirak Province population are ethnic Armenians who belong to the Armenian Apostolic Church. The northern and middle parts of Shirak are under the jurisdiction of the Diocese of Shirak headed by Bishop Mikayel Ajapahyan of the Cathedral of the Holy Mother of God in Gyumri, while the southern part is under the jurisdiction of the Diocese of Artik headed by Vardapet Narek Avagyan of the Saint Gregory Cathedral in Artik.

There is a significant minority of Armenian Catholics in Shirak. The number of the Catholic population in the province is around 30,000. Gyumri is home to around 20,000, while the rest are found in the surrounding rural settlements. The villages of Arevik, Arpeni, Bavra, Ghazanchi, Marmashen, Mets Sepasar, Panik and Sizavet have a majority of Armenian Catholics, while the village of Azatan has around 1,500 Catholics (30% of village's population). As of 2016, Shirak is home to 9 catholic operating churches. The Cathedral of the Holy Martyrs in Gyumri is the seat of the Armenian Catholic Ordinariate of Eastern Europe headed by Archbishop Raphaël François Minassian.

The presence of the small Russian Orthodox community along with the Russian military base personnel in Gyumri is marked with the Saint Alexandra the Martyr's Church, Saint Michael the Archangel's Church and the church of Saint Arsenije.

The small village of Shirakavan has around 30 Yazidi residents.

Prior to the outbreak of the Nagorno-Karabakh conflict in 1988 and the departure of Azerbaijanis from Armenia, Shirak also had an Azerbaijani minority population, almost entirely concentrated in the former Amasia District, where, in 1972, Azerbaijanis constituted 70% of a population of 19,724 people.

== Administrative divisions ==
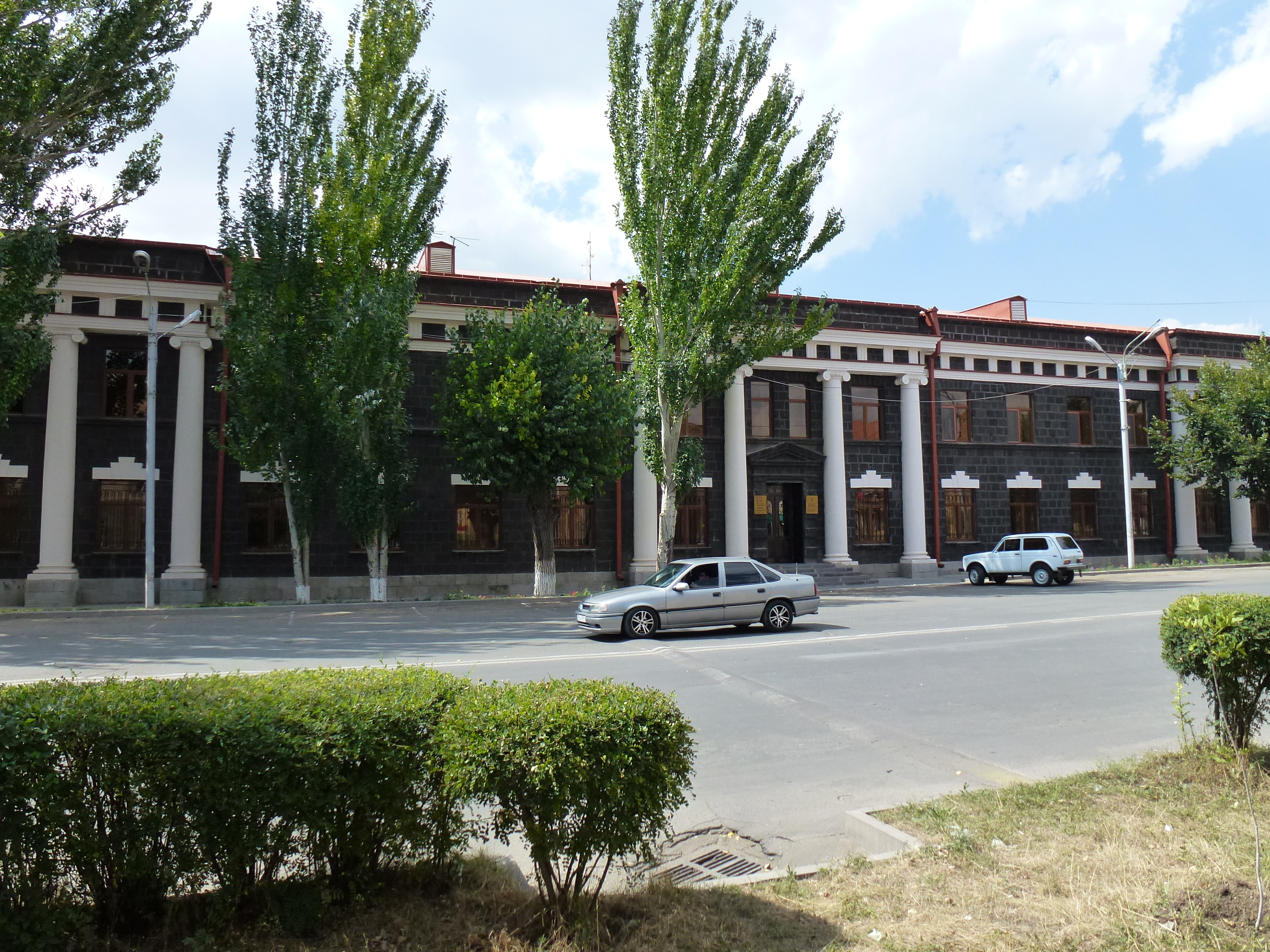
Shirak Province administration in Gyumri

Following the administrative reform of 2021, Shirak Province is divided into six municipalities:

Municipality	Area (km^{2})	Population (2022 census)	Centre	Included villages
Gyumri Municipality		112,301	Gyumri	
Artik Municipality		48,789	Artik	Anushavan, Arevshat, Geghanist, Getap, Lernakert, Lusakert, Haykasar, Hayrenyats, Harich, Horom, Hovtashen, Mets Mantash, Meghrashen, Nahapetavan, Nor Kyank, Pemzashen, Saralanj, Saratak, Spandaryan, Vardakar, Tufashen, Panik, Pokr Mantash
Ani Municipality		19,282	Maralik	Aniavan, Aghin, Aghin Kayaran, Anipemza, Bagravan, Bardzrashen, Dzithankov, Dzorakap, Gusanagyugh, Haykadzor, Isahakyan, Jrapi, Karaberd, Norshen, Lanjik, Lusaghbyur, Sarakap, Sarnaghbyur, Shirakavan
Akhuryan Municipality		39,988	Akhuryan	Akhurik, Akhuryan Kayaran, Arapi, Arevik, Aygabats, Azatan, Basen, Bayandur, Beniamin, Getk, Gharibjanyan, Hatsik, Hatsikavan, Haykavan, Hovit, Hovuni, Jajur, Jajuravan, Jrarat, Kamo, Kaps, Karmrakar, Karnut, Keti, Krashen, Lernut, Marmashen, Mayisyan, Mets Sariar, Pokrashen, Shirak, Vahramaberd, Voskehask, Yerazgavors
Amasia Municipality		5,443	Amasia	Aregnadem, Bandivan, Byurakn, Gtashen, Kamkhut, Hovtun, Voghji, Hoghmik, Meghrashat, Jradzor, Alvar, Aghvorik, Ardenis, Garnarij, Lorasar, Darik, Yeghnajur, Aravet, Zarishat, Tsaghkut, Shaghik, Zorakert, Berdashen, Yerizak, Paghakn
Ashotsk Municipality		9,681	Ashotsk	Arpeni, Bashgyugh, Bavra, Dzorashen, Ghazanchi, Goghovit, Hartashen, Kakavasar, Karmravan, Krasar, Lernagyugh, Mets Sepasar, Musayelyan, Pokr Sariar, Pokr Sepasar, Salut, Saragyugh, Sarapat, Sizavet, Tavshut, Torosgyugh, Tsoghamarg, Vardaghbyur, Zuygaghbyur

In recent years, many rural settlements in Shirak have become abandoned, including the villages of Akhuryan Kayaran, Aravet, Lorasar and Yerizak.

== Culture ==
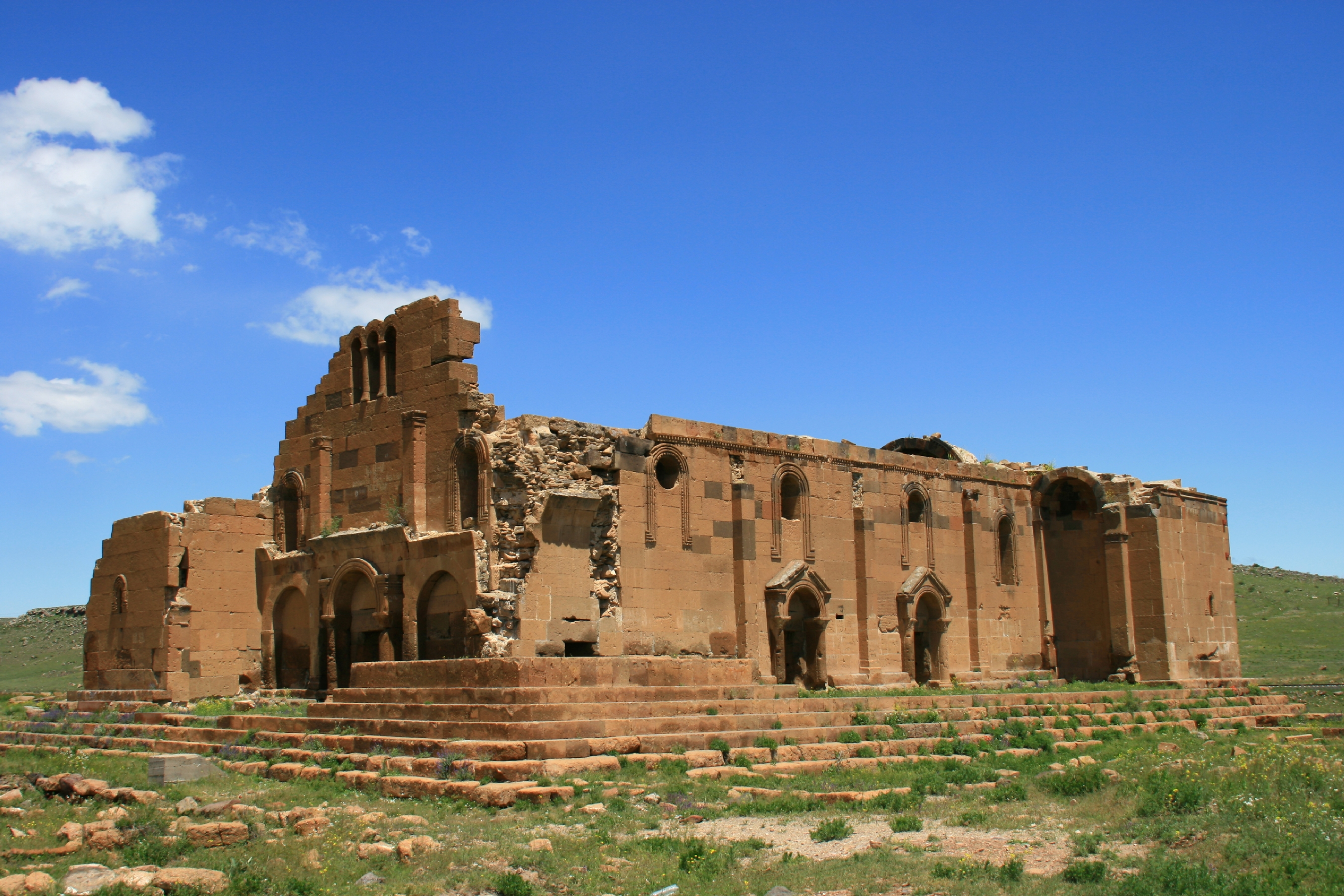
Yererouk Basilica of the 4th-5th centuries, is one of the earliest samples of Armenian church architecture

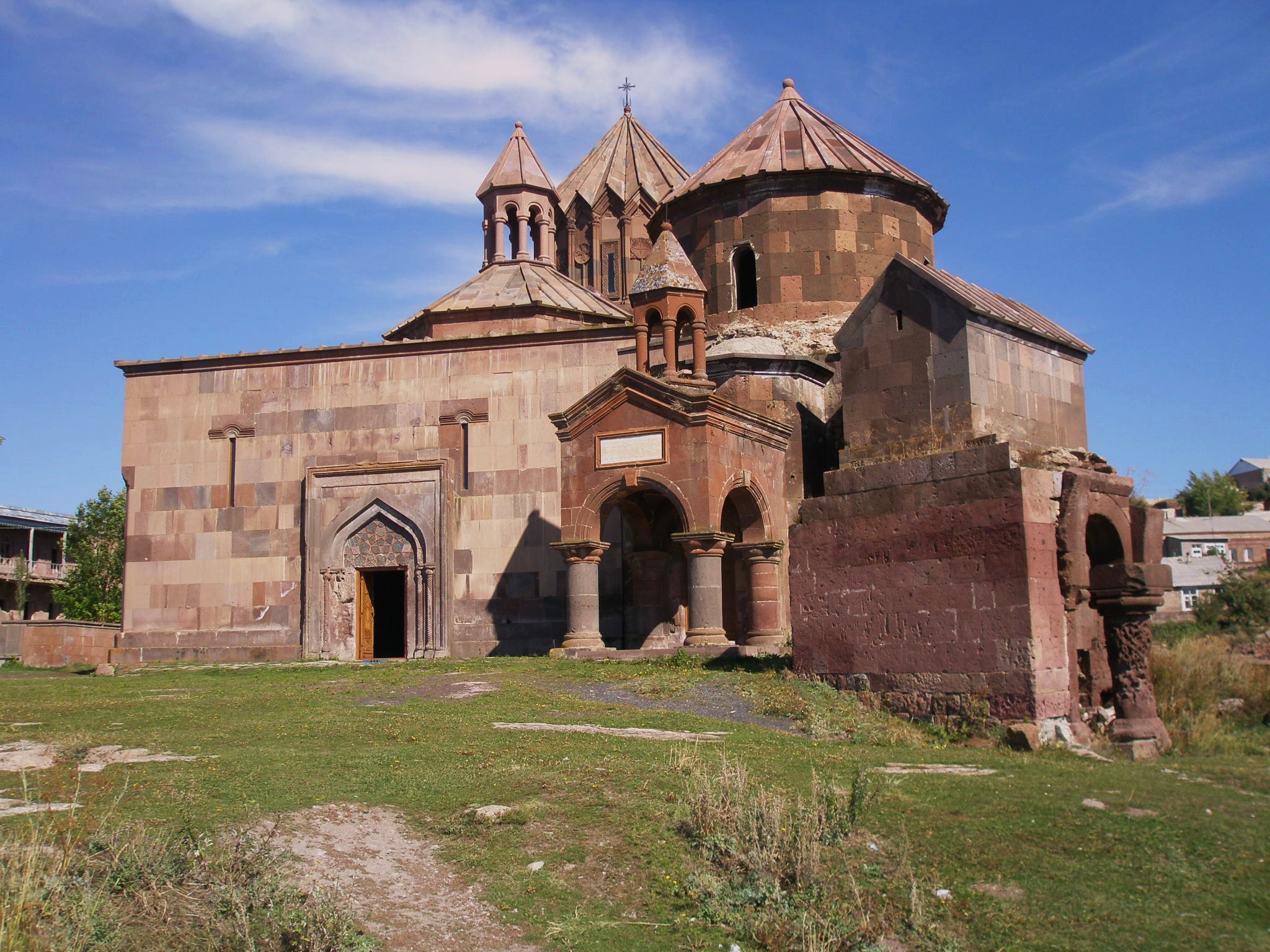
Harichavank Monastery, 8th century

=== Fortresses and archaeological sites ===
- Horom Citadel of the Bronze Age-Urartian eras,
- Vahramaberd Fortress of the Urartian era dating back to 730-714 BC,
- Kumayri historic district of the early 19th century,
- Sev Berd fortress of the 1840s.

=== Churches and monasteries ===
- Yererouk Basilica, 4th-5th centuries,
- Saint Marine Church of Artik of the 5th century,
- Hogevank Monastery of the 5th century,
- Surb Gevorg Church of Artik, 6th-7th th-centuries,
- Tiravor Church of Mayisyan of the 7th century,
- Lmbatavank Church of the 7th century,
- Harichavank Monastery of the 8th century,
- Makaravank Church of Pemzashen of the 10th century,
- Marmashen Monastery of the 10th century,
- Saint Paul and Peter Church of Bardzrashen, 10th-13th centuries,
- Church of the Holy Saviour, Gyumri of 1872,
- Cathedral of the Holy Mother of God, Gyumri of 1884.

=== Media ===
Shirak is home to many TV stations:

- Tsayg TV, based in Gyumri, operating since 1991.
- Shirak Public TV, based in Gyumri, operating since 1992.
- Gala TV, based in Gyumri, operating since 2005.

Shrjapat weekly, published in Gyumri, is a notable local newspaper of Shirak.

== Transportation ==
=== Air transportation ===
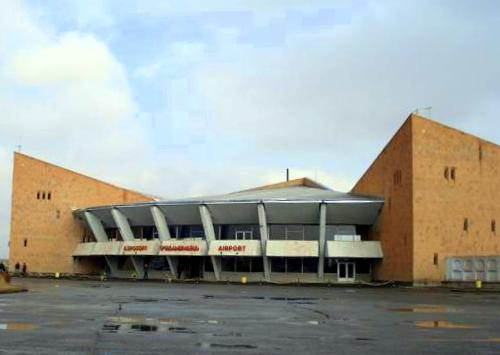
Shirak Airport

Shirak is served by the international Shirak Airport, about 5 kilometres (3.1 miles) to the southeast of the Gyumri city centre. It was inaugurated in 1961 and is the second largest airport in Armenia. It is considered an alternative hub for the Zvartnots International Airport in Yerevan.

At the beginning of 2017, the government of Armenia focused on revitalizing the airport. Multiple new airlines began operating flights to the airport, including Taron Avia, a new Armenian airline based in Gyumri, and Pobeda which is a Russian low-cost airline and a wholly owned subsidiary of Aeroflot. In order to attract more customers, the Ministry of Nature Protection made meteorological services free for all airlines flying to Gyumri, lowering ticket costs. The Gyumri Technology Center also participated in helping revitalize the airport by adding interior design details to improve the airport's look.

=== Railway ===
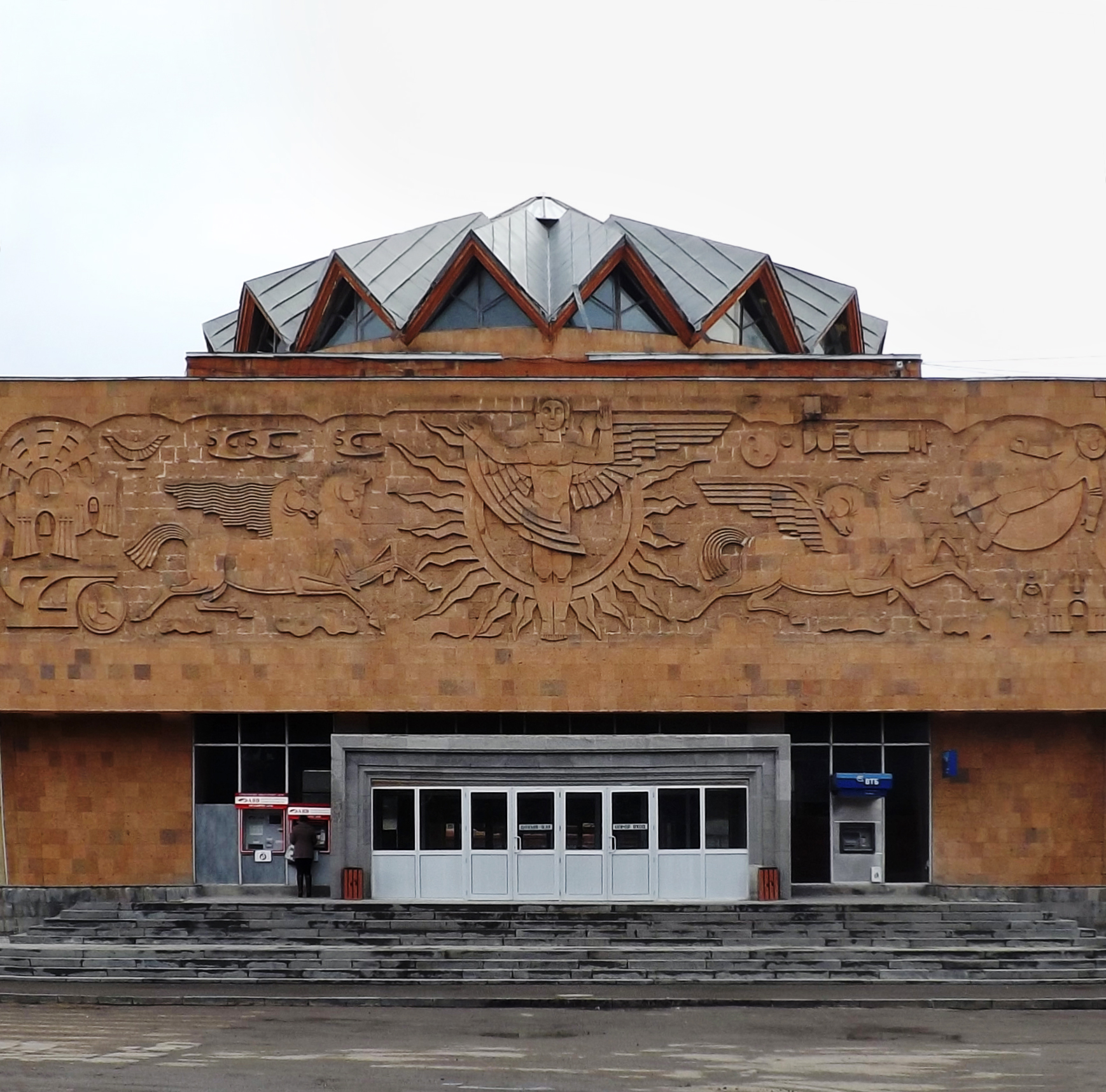
Gyumri Railway Station

The railway junction of Gyumri is the oldest and the largest one in Armenia. It was formed in 1897 and the first railway link to Alexandropol that connected the city with Tiflis was completed in 1899. The rail line was then extended from Alexandropol to Yerevan (in 1902), Kars (in 1902), Jolfa (in 1906), and Tabriz. As a result, Alexandropol became an important rail hub.

As of 2017, the Gyumri Railway Station operates regular trips to Yerevan and Batumi. The South Caucasus Railway CJSC, is the current operator of the railway sector in Armenia. The Gyumri-Yerevan railway trip has many stops in Shirak Province, including the stations of Bayandur, Shirakavan, Isahakyan, Aghin kayaran, Jrapi, Bagravan and Aniavan.

=== Public vans and taxis ===
Public transport is available in the provincial centre Gyumri. It is mainly served by public vans, locally-known as marshrutka. The central station of the city serves as bus terminal for inter-city transport, serving outbound routes towards the villages of Shirak, as well as major cities and towns in Armenia and neighbouring Georgia.

The M-7 Motorway passes across the province from east to west, connecting the city of Gyumri with the rest of Armenia.

== Economy ==
=== Agriculture ===
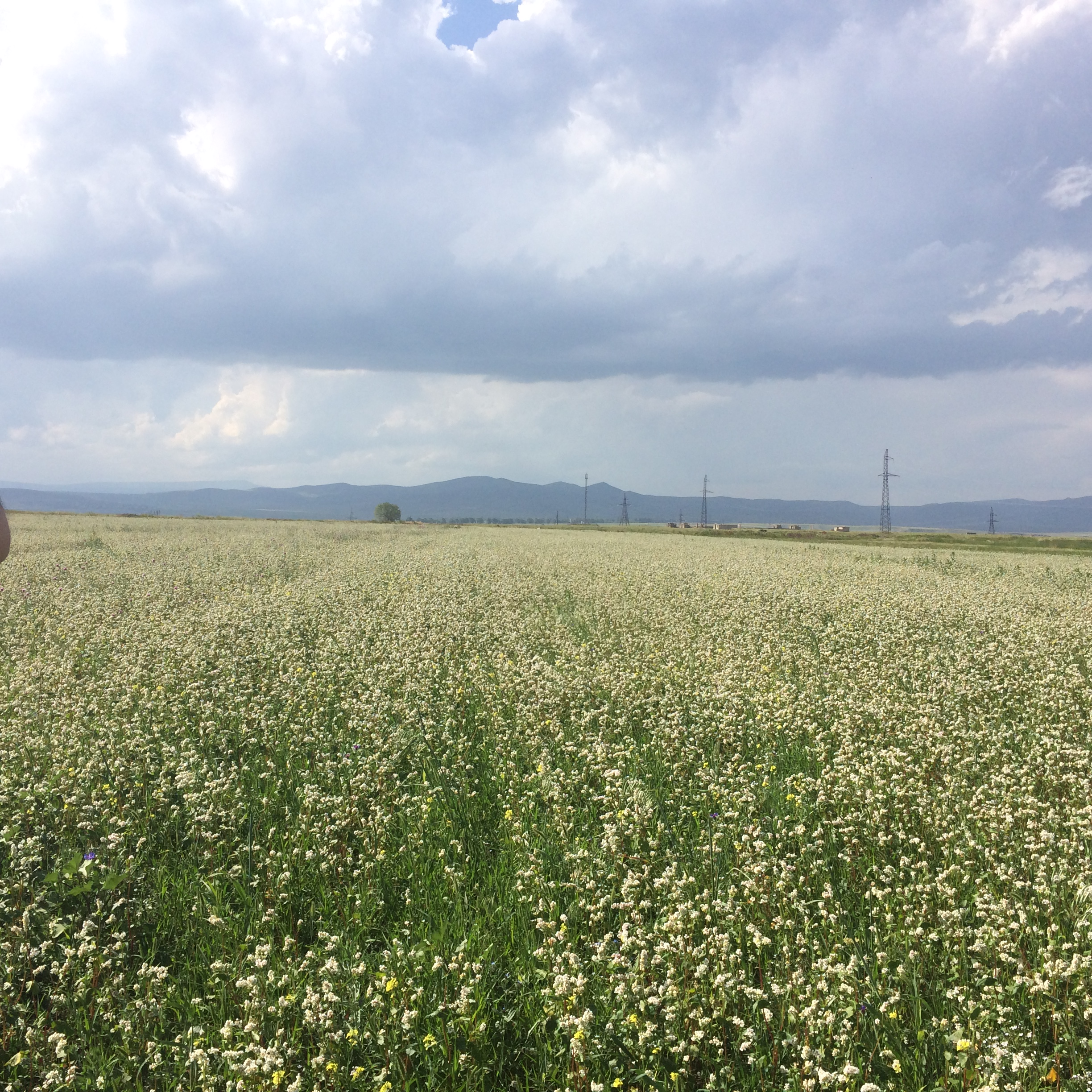
Buckwheat fields in Shirak

The economy of the province is mainly based on agriculture, including farming and cattle-breeding. It has a share of 11.6% in the annual total agricultural product of Armenia. Around 80% (2,145.5 km^{2}) of the total area of the province are arable lands, out of which 36.7% (787 km^{2}) are ploughed.

The fertile Shirak plain is the largest producer of grains and potato in Armenia. The irrigation system in the province is highly developed. 9 water reservoirs of different sizes -with a total capacity of 673,000,000 cubic metres (2.38×10^{10} cu ft) are able to irrigate around 300 km^{2} (116 sq mi) of farmlands.

Shirak is the first among the Armenian provinces in cattle breeding. There are also fish farming ponds near Gyumri and many rural communities.

=== Industry ===
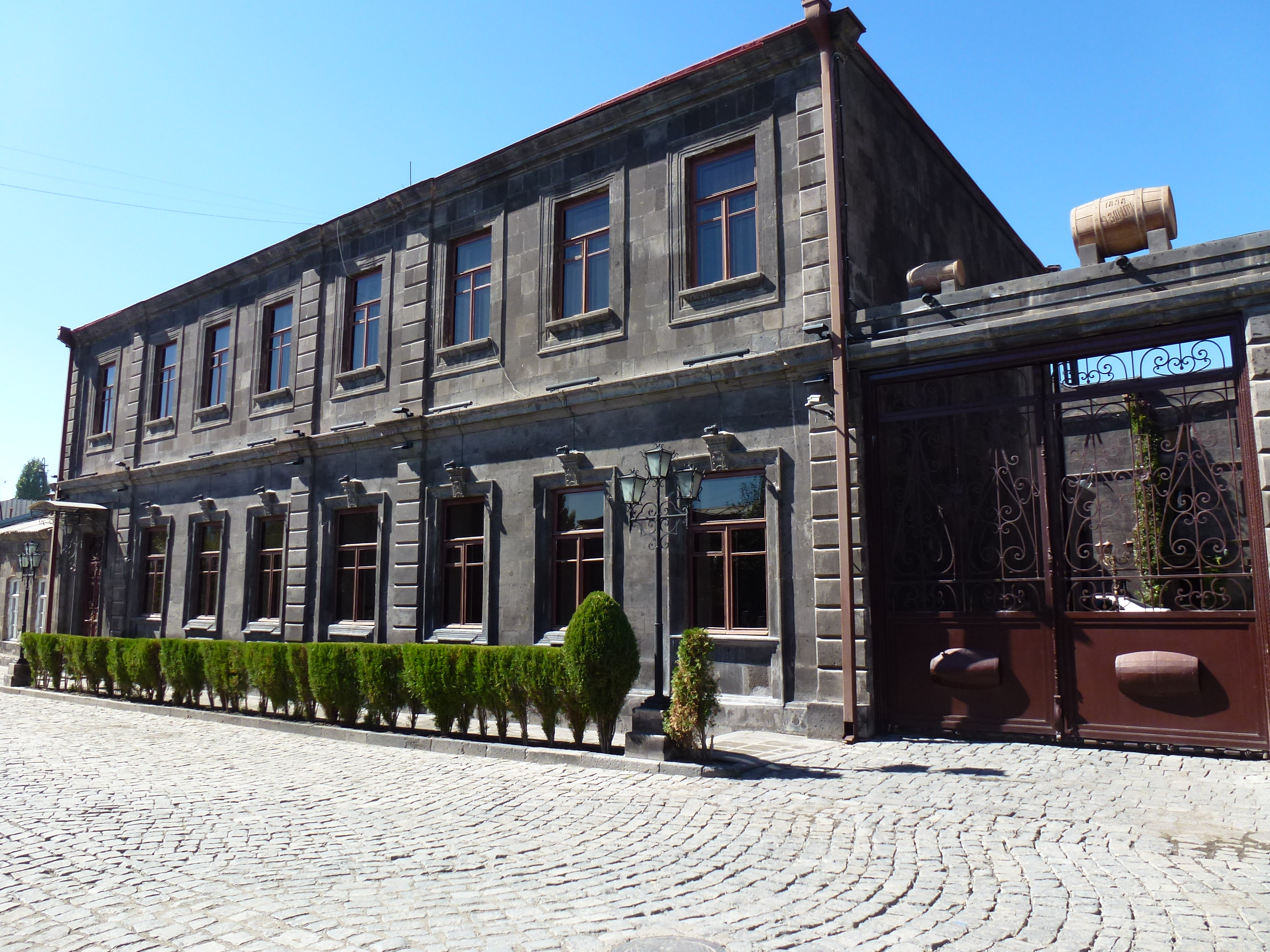
The Gyumri Brewery

During the Soviet period, the region was a major industrial hub within the Armenian SSR. After independence, the industrial sector of the region drastically declined. Currently, the province contributes 3.5% of the annual total industrial product of Armenia. Shirak is the largest producer of building materials in Armenia, mainly tufa stones and pumice.

- The industrial sector in the provincial centre Gyumri includes the production of building materials (tufa and basalt), hosiery and textile manufacturing, food processing and dairy products, alcoholic drinks, electronic machines, etc. The largest industrial plant in Gyumri is the Gyumri-Beer Brewery opened in 1972. The factory produces a variety of lager beer under the brands Gyumri, Ararat and Aleksandrapol. The city is also home to the "Factory of Bending Machinses" opened in 1912, the "Arshaluys" hosiery manufacturing enterprise established in 1926, the "Karhat" machine tools plant opened in 1959, the "Chap Chemical LLC" since 1999, the "Armtex Group" clothing factory since 2000, and the "Lentex" hosiery manufacturing plant is operating since 2001. Other industrial firms of the city include the "Aleqpol" factory for dairy products, the "Anusharan" confectionery plant, and the "Gold Plast" plant for building materials.
- The town of Artik is famous for its tufa stones. It is home to many stone-processing plants that produce travertine, tufa and basalt, including the "ArtikTuf" form established in 1928, the "TufaBlocks Factory" founded in 1997, and the "Karastgh" stone-processing factory operating since 2005. Artik is also home to the "Vartan-Anahit LLC" for metal-plastic products, the Artik Cheese Factory, the "Eliz Group" for dairy products, the "Artik Factory for Vacuum Stoves", and the "Artik Steklomash" metal casting factory.
- During the Soviet period, the town of Maralik had many large industrial firms with a lights and electronics factory and 3 plants for building materials production. Currently, the only surviving plant in the town is the Maralik cotton-spinning factory.
- Factories for dairy products are also found in Shirak, with the largest two firms located in the villages of Azatan (Igit Dairy Factory since 1993) and Musayelyan (Ashotsk Cheese Factory since 1996). The village of Akhuryan is home to the "Lusastgh-Sugar" factory (opened in 2010), the largest sugar producer in the Southern Caucasus region. The village of Shirakavan is home to the "Shirak Wine Factory" opened in 2009.

== Education ==
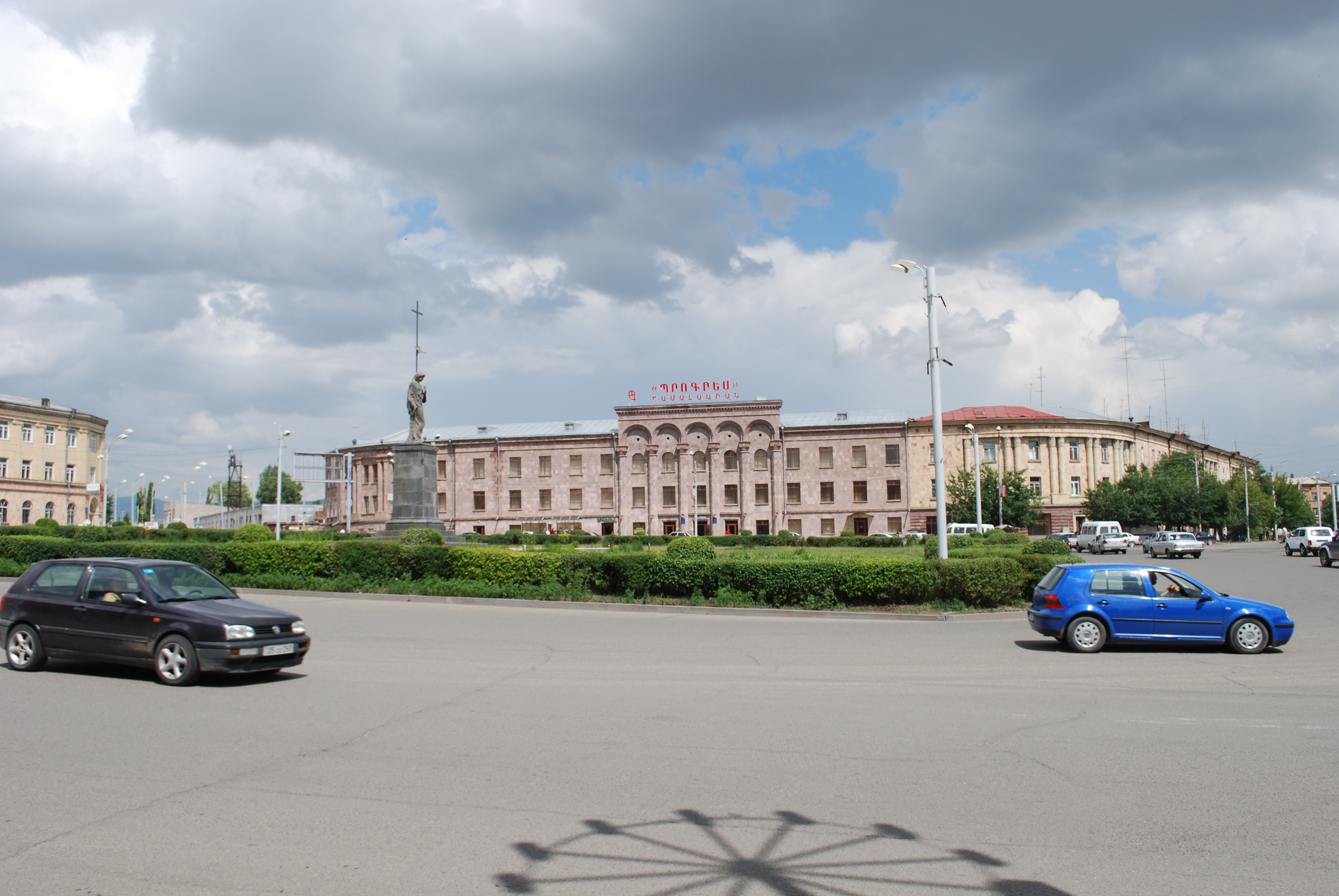
The Progress University in Gyumri

Gyumri is the main educational centre of the province. The city is home to 3 universities:

- Shirak State University named after M. Nalbandian
- Progress University
- Imastaser Anania Shirakatsi University

Branches of the National Polytechnic University of Armenia, Armenian State University of Economics, Yerevan Komitas State Conservatory, Yerevan State Academy of Fine Arts, Yerevan State Institute of Theatre and Cinematography, European Regional Educational Academy and Haybusak University of Yerevan also operate in Gyumri.

As of the 2015-16 educational year, Shirak had 167 schools.

The Turpanjian Theological High School of the Mother See of Holy Etchmiadzin has been operating since 1881 within the Harichavank monastic complex in Shirak.

== Sport ==
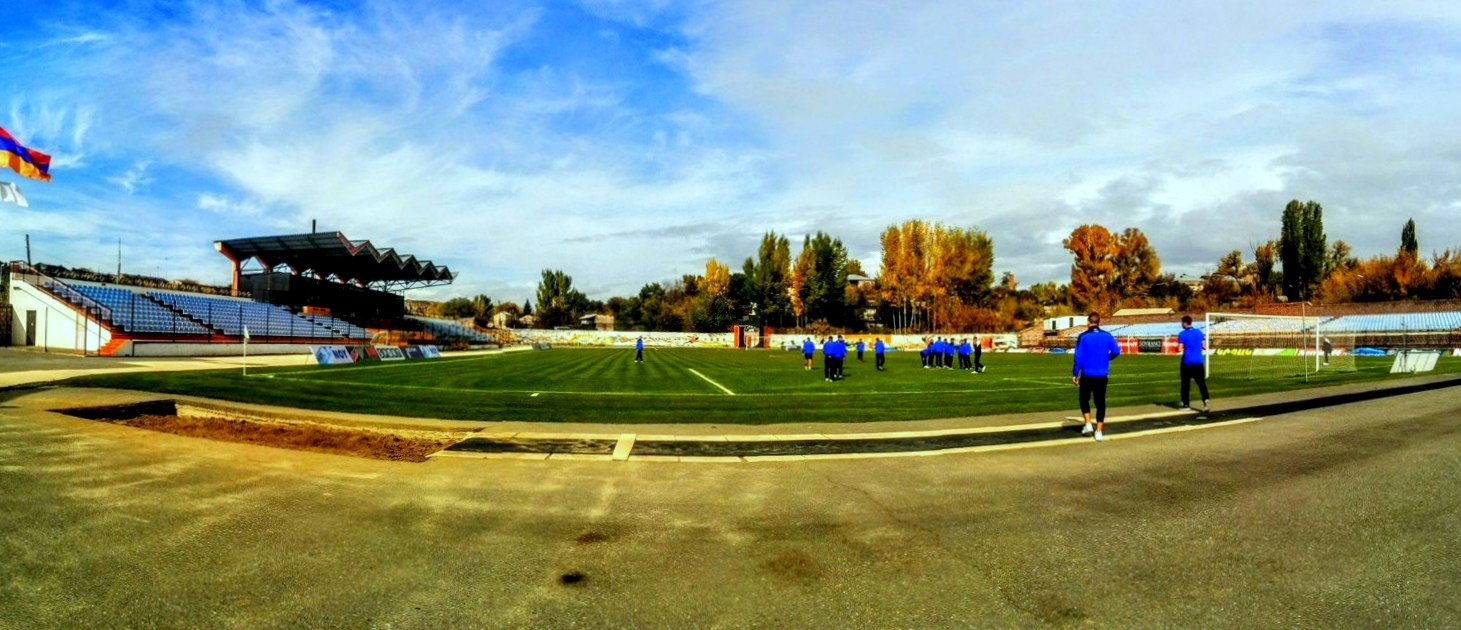
Gyumri City Stadium

Football, basketball and chess are the most popular sports in the province. However, other Olympic sports including wrestling and weightlifting are also popular, mainly in Gyumri. Shirak is home to many former and current World, Olympic and European champions in several types of sports who competed under the flag of Soviet Union and later under the Armenian flag.

The city is represented by the FC Shirak at the Armenian Premier League competition. Aragats FC were the second football club in Gyumri, but they were dissolved in 2002 due to financial difficulties.

FC Tufagorts (dissolved in 1995) and FC Sipan (dissolved in 1993), both from the town of Artik, had also represented the province in the football competitions of Armenia.

The largest sport venue of the province is the Gyumri City Stadium. Gyumri is also home to the FFA Football Academy. The towns of Artik and Maralik have a football stadium each with minor capacities.

Gyumri is also famous for winter sports. The Gyumri school of winter sports, renovated in 2015–16, is named after Ludvig Mnatsakanyan. The area of Ashotsk has a modern skiing trail hosting an international tournament for cross-country skiing.

== Gallery ==
Shirak

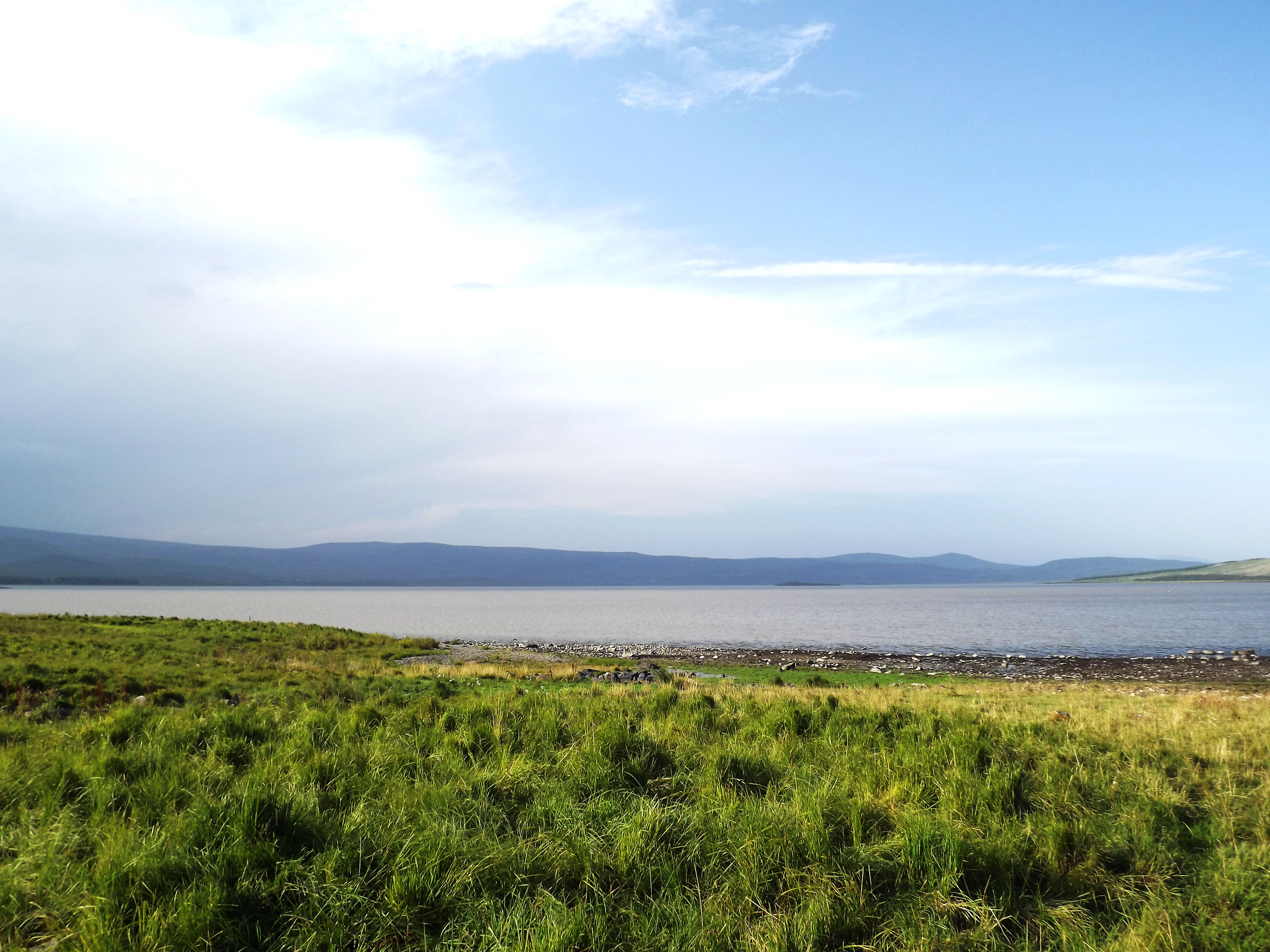
Lake Arpi and its National park

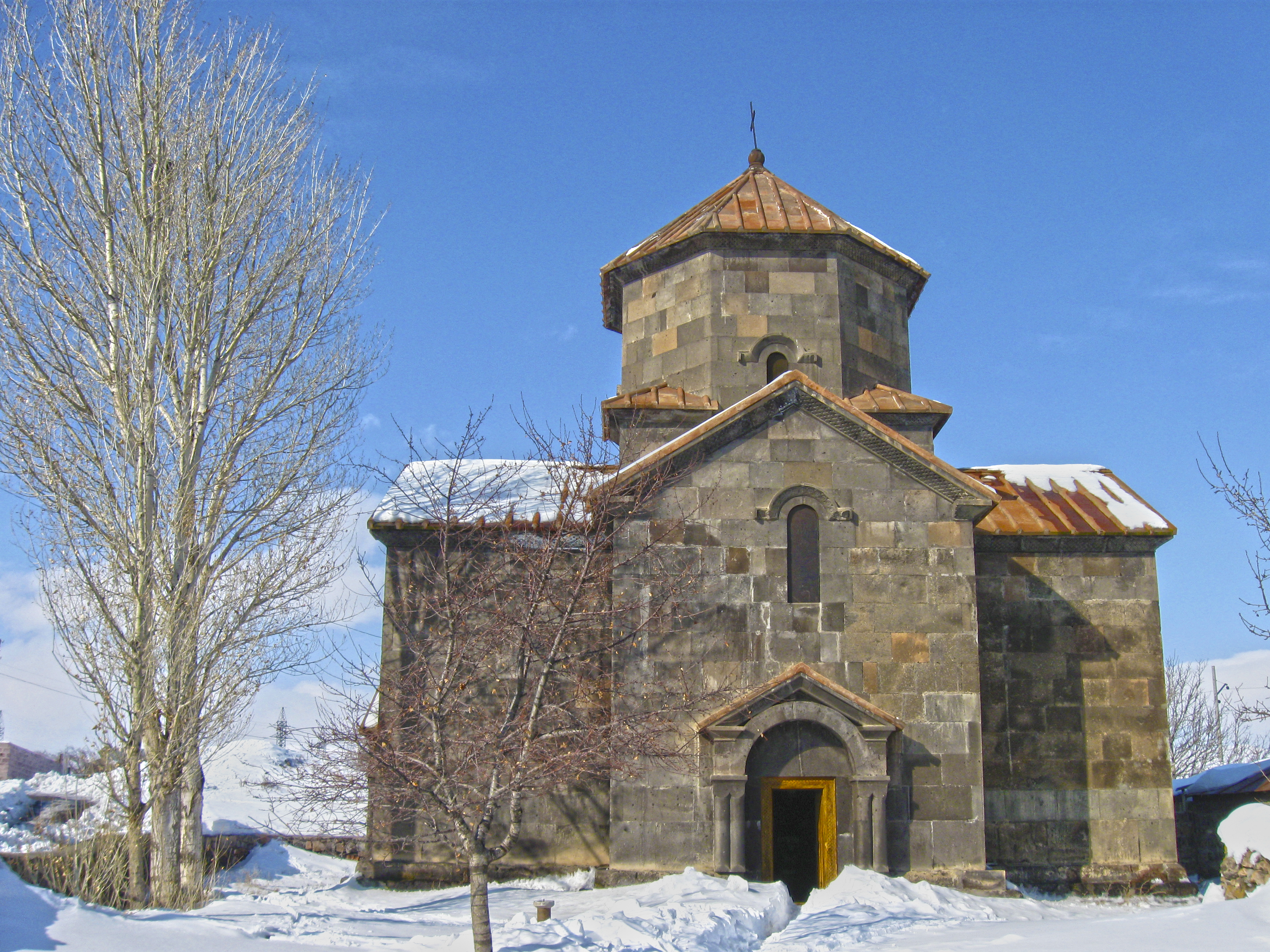
Tiravor Church in Mayisyan, 7th century

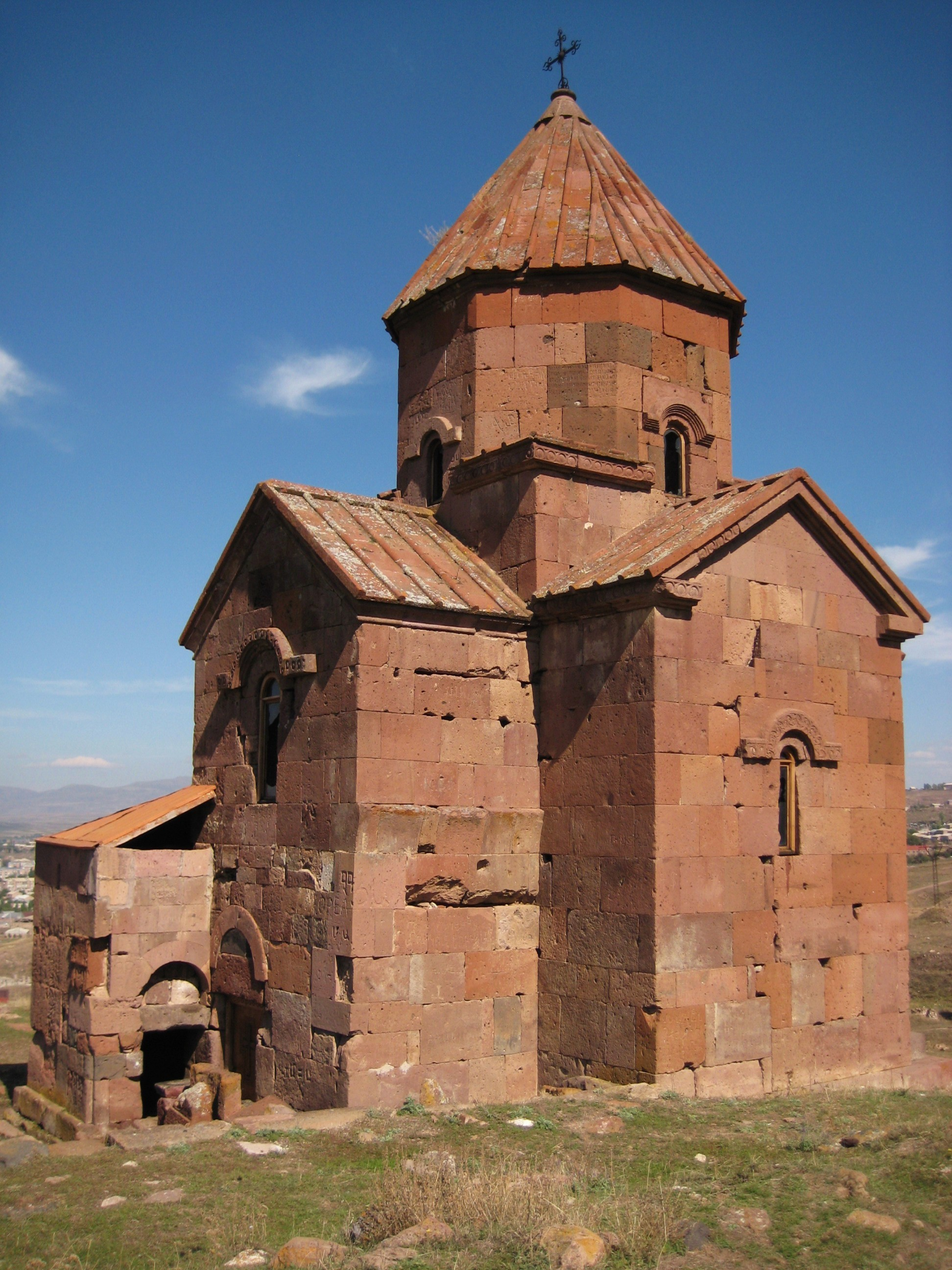
Lmbatavank near Artik, 7th century

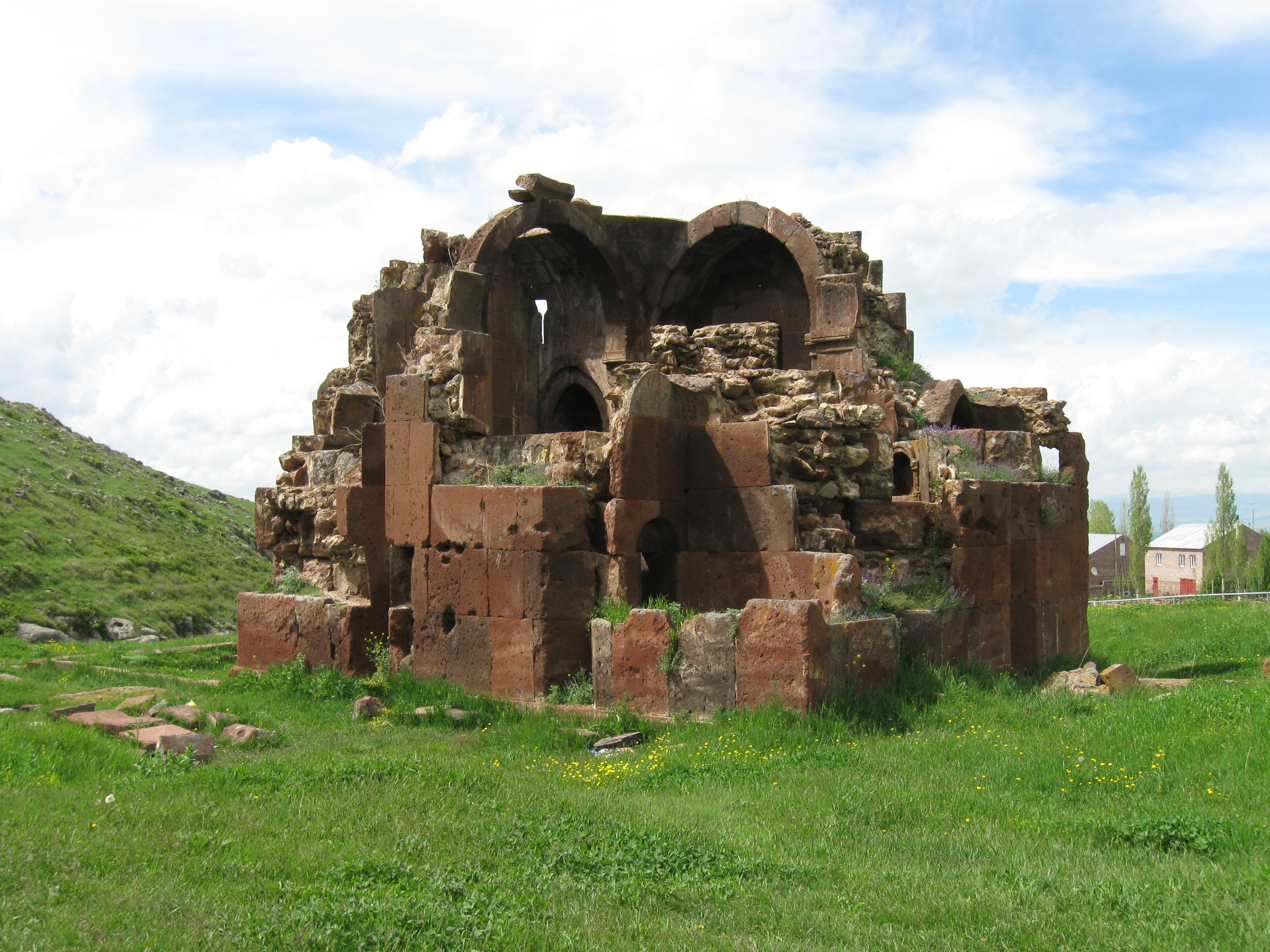
The remains of Makaravank Church of Pemzashen, 10th century

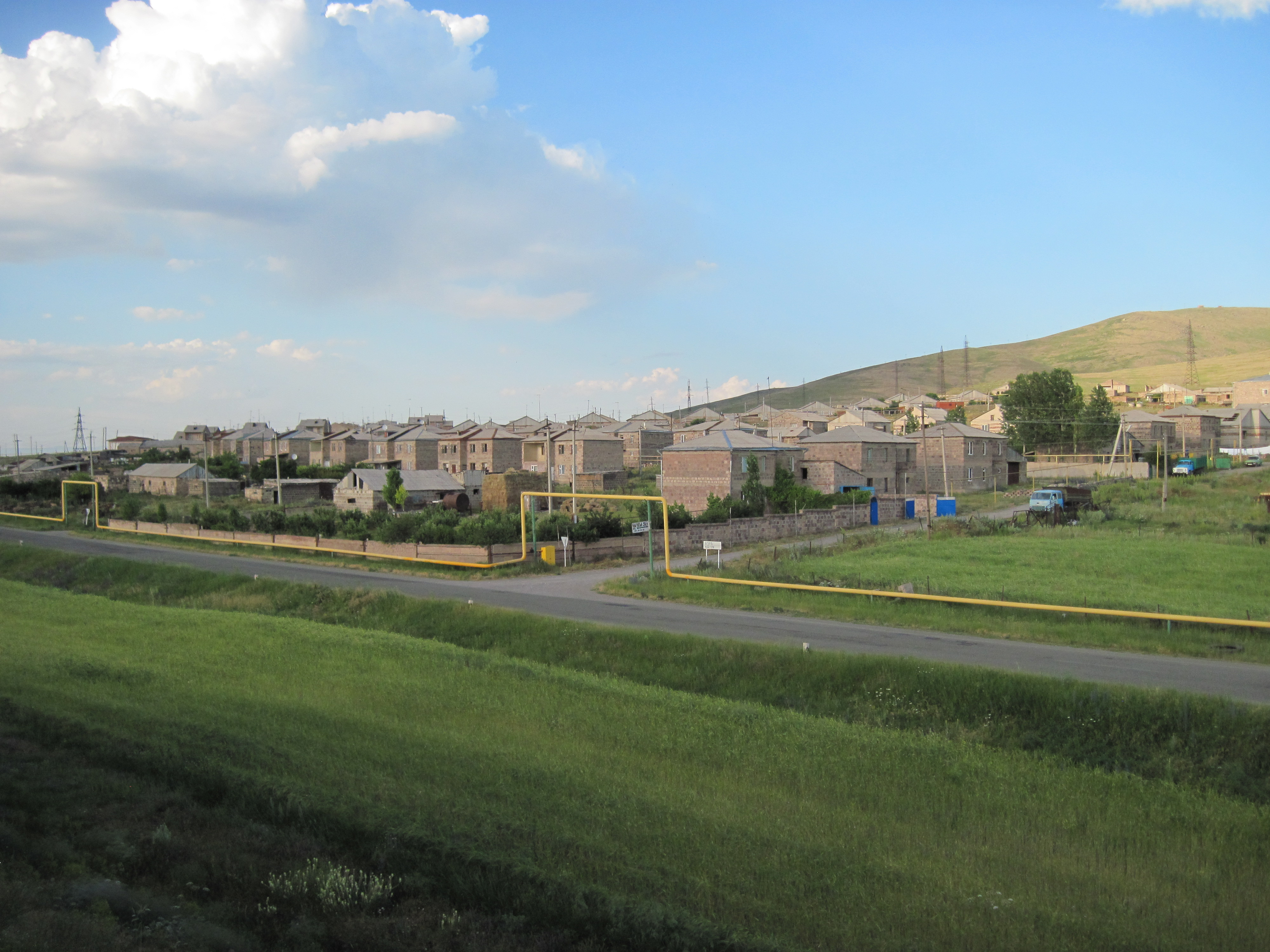
Aghin village

== See also ==
- 1988 Armenian earthquake
- Avetik Isahakyan
- Hovhannes Shiraz
- Frunzik Mkrtchyan
- Gyumri
- Gyumri Technology Center
