= List of settlements in Armenia =

Official list of settlements of the Republic of Armenia

On 1 January 2022, there were 48 urban settlements (Armenian: քաղաքներ, romanized: kʼaġakʼner, lit. 'cities'), excluding the capital city of Yerevan, and 953 villages (գյուղեր, gyuġer), 34 of which were empty, in Armenia. These settlements are organised within 77 municipalities, within 10 provinces (Yerevan is the 11th, special, province); they are listed here by their administrative divisions.

== Yerevan ==
The 12 districts of Yerevan are as follow:

District name	Population (Note: This indicates the permanent population recorded on 1 January 2022.)
Ajapnyak (Աջափնյակ)	110,400
Avan (Ավան)	53,300
Arabkir (Արաբկիր)	115,000
Davtashen (Դավթաշեն)	43,300
Erebuni (Էրեբունի)	130,100
Kentron (Կենտրոն)	125,900
Malatia-Sebastia (Մալաթիա-Սեբաստիա)	141,000
Nor Nork (Նոր Նորք)	134,400
Nork-Marash (Նորք-Մարաշ)	11,900
Nubarashen (Նուբարաշեն)	10,400
Shengavit (Շենգավիթ)	142,100
Kanaker-Zeytun (Քանաքեռ-Զեյթուն)	75,000
Yerevan	1,092,800

== Aragatsotn ==
The 3 urban settlements and 118 villages within the 9 municipalities of the Aragatsotn Province are as follow:

Settlement name	Population
Urban settlements
Ashtarak (Աշտարակ)	16,630
Aparan (Ապարան)	5,873
Talin (Թալին)	4,042
Ashtarak Municipality
Mughni (Մուղնի)	1,063
Agarak (Ագարակ)	2,065
Aghdzk (Աղձք)	1,897
Antarut (Անտառուտ)	393
Avan (Ավան)	940
Aragatsotn (Արագածոտն)	1,171
Aruch (Արուճ)	1,253
Artashavan (Արտաշավան)	724
Bazmaghbyur (Բազմաղբյուր)	1,006
Byurakan (Բյուրական)	4,621
Dprevank (Դպրևանք)	78
Lernarot (Լեռնարոտ)	353
Lusaghbyur (Լուսաղբյուր)	0
Khnusik (Խնուսիկ)	17
Karbi (Կարբի)	5,253
Karin (Կարին)	666
Kosh (Կոշ)	3,437
Ghazaravan (Ղազարավան)	681
Nigatun (Նիգատուն)	0
Nor Amanos (Նոր Ամանոս)	1,439
Nor Yedesia (Նոր Եդեսիա )	1,439
Nor Yerznka (Նոր Երզնկա)	1,885
Voskehat (Ոսկեհատ)	1,163
Voskevaz (Ոսկեվազ)	4,530
Saghmosavan (Սաղմոսավան)	219
Sasunik (Սասունիկ)	2,948
Verin Sasunik (Վերին Սասունիկ)	85
Tegher (Տեղեր)	189
Ushi (Ուշի)	1,725
Ujan (Ուջան)	3,358
Parpi (Փարպի)	2,450
Ohanavan (Օհանավան)	2,697
Oshakan (Օշական)	5,950
Orgov (Օրգով)	534
Aparan Municipality
Aragats (Արագած)	3,402
Arayi (Արայի)	580
Apnagyugh (Ափնագյուղ)	581
Yeghipatrush (Եղիպատրուշ)	711
Yernjatap (Երնջատափ)	563
Ttujur (Թթուջուր)	237
Lusagyugh (Լուսագյուղ)	824
Tsaghkashen (Ծաղկաշեն)	445
Kayk (Կայք)	608
Hartavan (Հարթավան)	1,009
Dzoraglukh (Ձորագլուխ)	262
Nigavan (Նիգավան)	689
Shenavan (Շենավան)	1,532
Shoghakn (Շողակն)	170
Chknagh (Չքնաղ)	259
Jrambar (Ջրամբար)	125
Saralanj (Սարալանջ)	228
Vardenis (Վարդենիս)	729
Vardenut (Վարդենուտ)	1,020
Kuchak (Քուչակ)	2,081
Melikgyugh (Մելիքգյուղ)	1,082
Talin Municipality
Agarakavan (Ագարակավան)	1,065
Akunk (Ակունք)	694
Ashnak (Աշնակ)	1,348
Garnahovit (Գառնահովիտ)	378
Dashtadem (Դաշտադեմ)	556
Davtashen (Դավթաշեն)	758
Dian (Դիան)	114
Yeghnik (Եղնիկ)	481
Zarinja (Զարինջա)	647
Zovasar (Զովասար)	515
Tatul (Թաթուլ)	1,003
Irind (Իրինդ)	868
Tsaghkasar (Ծաղկասար)	91
Katnaghbyur (Կաթնաղբյուր)	1,189
Karmrashen (Կարմրաշեն)	508
Kakavadzor (Կաքավաձոր)	1,222
Hatsashen (Հացաշեն)	243
Dzoragyugh (Ձորագյուղ)	3
Mastara (Մաստարա)	2,582
Nerkin Bazmaberd (Ներքին Բազմաբերդ)	1,631
Nerkin Sasnashen (Ներքին Սասնաշեն)	1,115
Nor Artik (Նոր Արթիկ)	538
Shgharshik (Շղարշիկ)	572
Vosketas (Ոսկեթաս)	485
Partizak (Պարտիզակ)	379
Suser (Սուսեր)	270
Verin Bazmaberd (Վերին Բազմաբերդ)	485
Verin Sasnashen (Վերին Սասնաշեն)	369
Tsamakasar (Ցամաքասար)	420
Alagyaz Municipality
Alagyaz (Ալագյազ)	607
Avshen (Ավշեն)	461
Kaniashir (Կանիաշիր)	416
Charchakis (Ճարճակիս)	395
Mijnatun (Միջնատուն)	177
Mirak (Միրաք)	137
Shenkani (Շենկանի)	308
Jamshlu (Ջամշլու)	327
Rya Taza (Ռյա Թազա)	728
Sadunts (Սադունց)	329
Sipan (Սիփան)	321
Metsadzor Municipality
Metsadzor (Մեծաձոր)	172
Otevan (Օթևան)	247
Aragatsavan Municipality
Aragatsavan (Արագածավան)	6,220
Arteni (Արտենի)	3,710
Getap (Գետափ)	129
Lusakn (Լուսակն)	246
Arevut Municipality
Arevut (Արևուտ)	123
Ddmasar (Դդմասար)	175
Tlik (Թլիկ)	162
Kanch (Կանչ)	138
Hako (Հակո)	189
Sorik (Սորիկ)	117
Tsaghkahovit Municipality
Tsaghkahovit (Ծաղկահովիտ)	2,198
Berkarat (Բերքառատ)	928
Geghadir (Գեղադիր)	608
Geghadzor (Գեղաձոր)	1,253
Gegharot (Գեղարոտ)	470
Lernapar (Լեռնապար)	548
Tsilkar (Ծիլքար)	596
Hnaberd (Հնաբերդ)	2,287
Norashen (Նորաշեն)	1,288
Vardablur (Վարդաբլուր)	292
Shamiram Municipality
Shamiram (Շամիրամ)	2,063

== Ararat ==
The 4 urban settlements and 95 villages within the 5 municipalities of the Ararat Province are as follow:

Settlement name	Population
Urban settlements
Artashat (Արտաշատ)	19,083
Masis (Մասիս)	20,702
Ararat (Արարատ)	20,385
Vedi (Վեդի)	11,799
Artashat Municipality
Abovyan (Աբովյան)	1,422
Azatavan (Ազատավան)	2,873
Aygezard (Այգեզարդ)	2,954
Aygepat (Այգեպատ)	1,465
Aygestan (Այգեստան)	2,439
Araksavan (Արաքսավան)	847
Arevshat (Արևշատ)	2,226
Baghramyan (Բաղրամյան)	1,825
Bardzrashen (Բարձրաշեն)	1,499
Berdik (Բերդիկ)	853
Berkanush (Բերքանուշ)	1,921
Byuravan (Բյուրավան)	1,172
Burastan (Բուրաստան)	2,005
Getazat (Գետազատ)	2,004
Dalar (Դալար)	2,476
Deghdzut (Դեղձուտ)	845
Dimitrov (Դիմիտրով)	1,171
Ditak (Դիտակ)	655
Dvin (Դվին)	2,888
Lanjazat (Լանջազատ)	1,385
Kanachut (Կանաչուտ)	1,341
Kakavaberd (Կաքավաբերդ)	0
Hnaberd (Հնաբերդ)	610
Hovtashen (Հովտաշեն)	1,097
Masis (Մասիս)	1,505
Mkhchyan (Մխչյան)	4,955
Mrganush (Մրգանուշ)	1,040
Mrgavan (Մրգավան)	1,809
Mrgavet (Մրգավետ)	2,482
Narek (Նարեկ)	1,201
Nshavan (Նշավան)	1,505
Norashen (Նորաշեն)	3,471
Shahumyan (Շահումյան)	4,168
Vostan (Ոստան)	3,107
Jrashen (Ջրաշեն)	1,717
Vardashen (Վարդաշեն)	555
Verin Artashat (Վերին Արտաշատ)	3,897
Kaghtsrashen (Քաղցրաշեն)	2,926
Ararat Municipality
Ararat (Արարատ)	8,230
Avshar (Ավշար)	5,185
Armash (Արմաշ)	2,551
Yeraskh (Երասխ)	905
Zangakatun (Զանգակատուն)	1,160
Lanjar (Լանջառ)	222
Noyakert (Նոյակերտ)	1,969
Urtsalanj (Ուրցալանջ)	158
Paruyr Sevak (Պարույր Սևակ)	526
Surenavan (Սուրենավան)	2,606
Vardashat (Վարդաշատ)	198
Tigranashen (Տիգրանաշեն)	140 (Note: Occupied territory of Azerbaijan.)
Masis Municipality
Ayntap (Այնթափ)	9,835
Azatashen (Ազատաշեն)	760
Arbat (Արբաթ)	1,830
Argavand (Արգավանդ)	1,904
Arevabuyr (Արևաբույր)	1,317
Geghanist (Գեղանիստ)	3,096
Getapnya (Գետափնյա)	1,499
Dashtavan (Դաշտավան)	2,194
Darakert (Դարակերտ)	2,752
Darbnik (Դարբնիկ)	1,187
Zorak (Զորակ)	2,060
Khachpar (Խաչփառ)	2,108
Hayanist (Հայանիստ)	2,510
Hovtashat (Հովտաշատ)	4,054
Ghukasavan (Ղուկասավան)	2,120
Marmarashen (Մարմարաշեն)	3,546
Nizami (Նիզամի)	1,236
Nor Kharberd (Նոր Խարբերդ)	7,890
Nor Kyurin (Նոր Կյուրին)	1,148
Norabats (Նորաբաց)	2,515
Noramarg (Նորամարգ)	2,146
Jrahovit (Ջրահովիտ)	1,008
Ranchpar (Ռանչպար)	1,239
Sayat-Nova (Սայաթ-Նովա)	2,188
Sis (Սիս)	1,515
Sipanik (Սիփանիկ)	579
Vedi Municipality
Aygavan (Այգավան)	4,349
Aralez (Արալեզ)	2,536
Ginevet (Գինեվետ)	677
Goravan (Գոռավան)	2,658
Dashtakar (Դաշտաքար)	573
Yeghegnavan (Եղեգնավան)	1,463
Lanjanist (Լանջանիստ)	143
Lusashogh (Լուսաշող)	648
Lusarat (Լուսառատ)	2,716
Nor Kyank (Նոր Կյանք)	2,674
Nor Ughi (Նոր Ուղի)	868
Shaghap (Շաղափ)	926
Vosketap (Ոսկետափ)	5,048
Sisavan (Սիսավան)	2,227
Vanashen (Վանաշեն)	2,615
Taperakan (Տափերական)	4,042
Urtsadzor (Ուրցաձոր)	3,226
Pokr Vedi (Փոքր Վեդի)	3,322
Verin Dvin Municipality
Verin Dvin (Վերին Դվին)	1,820

== Armavir ==
The 3 urban settlements and 95 villages within the 8 municipalities of the Armavir Province are as follow:

Settlement name	Population
Urban settlements
Vagharshapat (Վաղարշապատ)	46,356
Armavir (Արմավիր)	27,713
Metsamor (Մեծամոր)	8,453
Armavir Municipality
Aygevan (Այգեվան)	1,553
Araks (Արաքս)	1,966
Lenughi (Լենուղի)	1,672
Lukashin (Լուկաշին)	2,169
Khanjyan (Խանջյան)	2,013
Hatsik (Հացիկ)	2,453
Mayisyan (Մայիսյան)	1,917
Myasnikyan (Մյասնիկյան)	4,423
Noravan (Նորավան)	1,233
Sardarapat (Սարդարապատ)	6,413
Vagharshapat Municipality
Voskehat (Ոսկեհատ)	3,402
Metsamor Municipality
Alashkert (Ալաշկերտ)	2,075
Aknalich (Ակնալիճ)	3,209
Amasia (Ամասիա)	995
Aygeshat (Այգեշատ)	1,843
Arazap (Արազափ)	1,747
Argavand (Արգավանդ)	2,541
Arevik (Արևիկ)	3,010
Armavir (Արմավիր)	3,406
Artashar (Արտաշար)	1,331
Bambakashat (Բամբակաշատ)	3,543
Berkashat (Բերքաշատ)	638
Getashen (Գետաշեն)	2,449
Yeghegnut (Եղեգնուտ)	2,132
Yeraskhahun (Երասխահուն)	1,879
Zartonk (Զարթոնք)	2,217
Haykavan (Հայկավան)	1,514
Margara (Մարգարա)	1,319
Mrgashat (Մրգաշատ)	5,865
Nalbandyan (Նալբանդյան)	4,417
Nor Armavir (Նոր Արմավիր)	1,998
Nor Artagers (Նոր Արտագերս)	1,381
Nor Kesaria (Նոր Կեսարիա)	1,394
Norapat (Նորապատ)	2,386
Shenavan (Շենավան)	1,820
Janfida (Ջանֆիդա)	3,684
Jrashen (Ջրաշեն)	980
Vardanashen (Վարդանաշեն)	1,148
Tandzut (Տանձուտ)	2,046
Taronik (Տարոնիկ)	2,406
Pshatavan (Փշատավան)	2,397
Baghramyan Municipality
Baghramyan (Բաղրամյան)	1,024
Argina (Արգինա)	520
Arevadasht (Արևադաշտ)	452
Artamet (Արտամետ)	228
Bagaran (Բագարան)	727
Dalarik (Դալարիկ)	3,770
Yervandashat (Երվանդաշատ)	705
Lernagog (Լեռնագոգ)	2,464
Koghbavan (Կողբավան)	148
Hushakert (Հուշակերտ)	927
Shenik (Շենիկ)	1,003
Vanand (Վանանդ)	1,108
Talvorik (Տալվորիկ)	202
Karakert (Քարակերտ)	4,433
Araks Municipality
Gay (Գայ)	3,758
Aknashen (Ակնաշեն)	1,637
Apaga (Ապագա)	1,981
Aratashen (Առատաշեն)	2,995
Araks (Արաքս)	1,744
Artimet (Արտիմետ)	1,923
Griboyedov (Գրիբոյեդով)	2,041
Lusagyugh (Լուսագյուղ)	1,033
Khoronk (Խորոնք)	3,048
Haykashen (Հայկաշեն)	1,291
Metsamor (Մեծամոր)	1,398
Jrarat (Ջրառատ)	3,052
Jrarbi (Ջրարբի)	1,678
Khoy Municipality
Geghakert (Գեղակերտ)	2,764
Aghavnatun (Աղավնատուն)	3,594
Amberd (Ամբերդ)	1,661
Aygeshat (Այգեշատ)	2,190
Aragats (Արագած)	2,882
Arshaluys (Արշալույս)	4,028
Dasht (Դաշտ)	1,033
Doghs (Դողս)	1,503
Lernamerdz (Լեռնամերձ)	525
Tsaghkalanj (Ծաղկալանջ)	1,815
Tsaghkunk (Ծաղկունք)	1,388
Tsiatsan (Ծիածան)	1,360
Haytagh (Հայթաղ)	2,958
Hovtamej (Հովտամեջ)	1,477
Monteavan (Մոնթեավան)	873
Mrgastan (Մրգաստան)	1,027
Shahumyan (Շահումյան)	1,643
Parakar Municipality
Parakar (Փարաքար)	6,556
Tairov (Թաիրով)	3,752
Aygek (Այգեկ)	1,539
Arevashat (Արևաշատ)	1,857
Baghramyan (Բաղրամյան)	3,016
Merdzavan (Մերձավան)	3,856
Musaler (Մուսալեռ)	3,102
Norakert (Նորակերտ)	3,264
Ptghunk (Պտղունք)	2,011
Ferik Municipality
Ferik (Ֆերիկ)	383

== Gegharkunik ==
The 5 urban settlements and 93 villages within the 6 municipalities of the Gegharkunik Province are as follow:

Settlement name	Population
Urban settlements
Gavar (Գավառ)	17,830
Sevan (Սևան)	18,870
Martuni (Մարտունի)	11,399
Vardenis (Վարդենիս)	12,322
Chambarak (Ճամբարակ)	5,495
Gavar Municipality
Berdkunk (Բերդկունք)	293
Gandzak (Գանձակ)	4,338
Gegharkunik (Գեղարքունիք)	1,848
Lanjaghbyur (Լանջաղբյուր)	2,640
Lchap (Լճափ)	1,182
Tsaghkashen (Ծաղկաշեն)	538
Tsovazard (Ծովազարդ)	2,185
Karmirgyugh (Կարմիրգյուղ)	6,033
Hayravank (Հայրավանք)	797
Noratus (Նորատուս)	6,165
Sarukhan (Սարուխան)	7,466
Chambarak Municipality
Aygut (Այգուտ)	808
Antaramej (Անտառամեջ)	165
Artsvashen (Արծվաշեն)	– (Note: Occupied by Azerbaijan.)
Barepat (Բարեպատ)	48
Getik (Գետիկ)	430
Dprabak (Դպրաբակ)	557
Ttujur (Թթուջուր)	990
Kalavan (Կալավան)	100
Dzoravank (Ձորավանք)	148
Chapkut (Ճապկուտ)	0
Martuni (Մարտունի)	543
Vahan (Վահան)	1,028
Martuni Municipality
Astghadzor (Աստղաձոր)	4,439
Artsvanist (Արծվանիստ)	3,070
Geghhovit (Գեղհովիտ)	6,190
Yeranos (Երանոս)	5,454
Zolakar (Զոլաքար)	6,828
Lernakert (Լեռնակերտ)	292
Lichk (Լիճք)	5,282
Tsakkar (Ծակքար)	2,885
Tsovasar (Ծովասար)	2,956
Tsovinar (Ծովինար)	4,583
Dzoragyugh (Ձորագյուղ)	4,800
Madina (Մադինա)	1,135
Nerkin Getashen (Ներքին Գետաշեն)	9,231
Nshkhark (Նշխարք)	0
Vaghashen (Վաղաշեն)	4,123
Vardadzor (Վարդաձոր)	2,825
Vardenik (Վարդենիկ)	8,212
Verin Getashen (Վերին Գետաշեն)	4,595
Sevan Municipality
Gagarin (Գագարին)	1,753
Geghamavan (Գեղամավան)	1,798
Ddmashen (Դդմաշեն)	2,626
Zovaber (Զովաբեր)	1,469
Lchashen (Լճաշեն)	4,356
Tsaghkunk (Ծաղկունք)	1,025
Tsovagyugh (Ծովագյուղ)	4,410
Norashen (Նորաշեն)	463
Chkalovka (Չկալովկա)	531
Semyonovka (Սեմյոնովկա)	231
Varser (Վարսեր)	1,913
Vardenis Municipality
Ayrk (Այրք)	235
Nerkin Shorzha (Ներքին Շորժա)	38
Verin Shorzha (Վերին Շորժա)	78
Azat (Ազատ)	72
Akhpradzor (Ախպրաձոր)	333
Akunk (Ակունք)	3,928
Avazan (Ավազան)	211
Areguni (Արեգունի)	256
Arpunk (Արփունք)	455
Geghamabak (Գեղամաբակ)	120
Geghamasar (Գեղամասար)	1,008
Geghakar (Գեղաքար)	144
Daranak (Դարանակ)	169
Zariver (Զառիվեր)	0
Lchavan (Լճավան)	553
Lusakunk (Լուսակունք)	1,472
Khachaghbyur (Խաչաղբյուր)	1,150
Tsovak (Ծովակ)	2,349
Kakhakn (Կախակն)	409
Karchaghbyur (Կարճաղբյուր)	2,163
Kut (Կութ)	150
Kutakan (Կուտական)	226
Makenis (Մաքենիս)	438
Mets Masrik (Մեծ Մասրիկ)	2,510
Norabak (Նորաբակ)	240
Norakert (Նորակերտ)	801
Shatjrek (Շատջրեք)	454
Shatvan (Շատվան)	398
Jaghatsadzor (Ջաղացաձոր)	119
Sotk (Սոթք)	936
Vanevan (Վանևան)	358
Torfavan (Տորֆավան)	474
Tretuk (Տրետուք)	218
Pambak (Փամբակ)	312
Pokr Masrik (Փոքր Մասրիկ)	653
Shoghakat Municipality
Shoghakat (Շողակաթ)	565
Artanish (Արտանիշ)	607
Aghberk (Աղբերք)	266
Drakhtik (Դրախտիկ)	915
Tsapatagh (Ծափաթաղ)	256
Jil (Ջիլ)	696

== Kotayk ==
The 7 urban settlements and 61 villages within the 11 municipalities of the Kotayk Province are as follow:

Settlement name	Population
Urban settlements
Hrazdan (Հրազդան)	39,957
Abovyan (Աբովյան)	45,025
Charentsavan (Չարենցավան)	20,368
Yeghvard (Եղվարդ)	12,106
Byureghavan (Բյուրեղավան)	9,142
Nor Hachn (Նոր Հաճն)	9,197
Tsaghkadzor (Ծաղկաձոր)	1,165
Hrazdan Municipality
Lernanist (Լեռնանիստ)	2,927
Jrarat (Ջրառատ)	491
Solak (Սոլակ)	2,439
Kaghsi (Քաղսի)	2,541
Abovyan Municipality
Arinj (Առինջ)	6,638
Aramus (Արամուս)	3,906
Balahovit (Բալահովիտ)	3,652
Geghashen (Գեղաշեն)	4,384
Getargel (Գետարգել)	823
Katnaghbyur (Կաթնաղբյուր)	651
Kamaris (Կամարիս)	2,313
Mayakovski (Մայակովսկի)	2,215
Ptghni (Պտղնի)	1,756
Verin Ptghni (Վերին Պտղնի)	820
Byureghavan Municipality
Jraber (Ջրաբեր)	464
Nurnus (Նուռնուս)	697
Nairi Municipality
Aragyugh (Արագյուղ)	1,114
Buzhakan (Բուժական)	1,615
Zovuni (Զովունի)	6,503
Zoravan (Զորավան)	1,673
Saralanj (Սարալանջ)	321
Proshyan (Պռոշյան)	5,588
Kasakh (Քասախ)	6,158
Tsaghkadzor Municipality
Aghavnadzor (Աղավնաձոր)	1,214
Artavaz (Արտավազ)	517
Gorgoch (Գոռգոչ)	17
Hankavan (Հանքավան)	61
Marmarik (Մարմարիկ)	727
Meghradzor (Մեղրաձոր)	2,587
Pyunik (Փյունիկ)	338
Nor Hachn Municipality
Argel (Արգել)	3,101
Getamej (Գետամեջ)	821
Teghenik (Թեղենիք)	518
Mrgashen (Մրգաշեն)	2,221
Nor Artamet (Նոր Արտամետ)	1,013
Nor Geghi (Նոր Գեղի)	6,630
Kanakeravan (Քանաքեռավան)	3,862
Karashamb (Քարաշամբ)	713
Charentsavan Municipality
Alapars (Ալափարս)	1,980
Arzakan (Արզական)	2,692
Bjni (Բջնի)	2,786
Karenis (Կարենիս)	738
Fantan (Ֆանտան)	890
Akunk Municipality
Akunk (Ակունք)	2,249
Zar (Զառ)	1,420
Zovashen (Զովաշեն)	168
Kaputan (Կապուտան)	1,357
Kotayk (Կոտայք)	1,808
Hatis (Հատիս)	313
Nor Gyugh (Նոր Գյուղ)	1,586
Sevaberd (Սևաբերդ)	234
Arzni Municipality
Arzni (Արզնի)	2,764
Garni Municipality
Garni (Գառնի)	8,015
Geghadir (Գեղադիր)	714
Geghard (Գեղարդ)	257
Goght (Գողթ)	2,079
Hatsavan (Հացավան)	580
Voghjaberd (Ողջաբերդ)	947
Jrvezh Municipality
Jrvezh (Ջրվեժ)	6,206
Zovk (Զովք)	846
Dzoraghbyur (Ձորաղբյուր)	2,446

== Lori ==
The 8 urban settlements and 120 villages within the 16 municipalities of the Lori Province are as follow:

Settlement name	Population
Urban settlements
Vanadzor (Վանաձոր)	76,220
Alaverdi (Ալավերդի)	12,238
Stepanavan (Ստեփանավան)	12,151
Spitak (Սպիտակ)	12,662
Tashir (Տաշիր)	7,232
Akhtala (Ախթալա)	1,931
Tumanyan (Թումանյան)	1,442
Shamlugh (Շամլուղ)	594
Vanadzor Municipality
Gugark (Գուգարք)	5,758
Darpas (Դարպաս)	1,747
Shahumyan (Շահումյան)	2,508
Alaverdi Municipality
Akner (Ակներ)	542
Akori (Աքորի)	2,549
Tsaghkashat (Ծաղկաշատ)	152
Kachachkut (Կաճաճկուտ)	268
Haghpat (Հաղպատ)	765
Jiliza (Ջիլիզա)	100
Akhtala Municipality
Akhtala (Ախթալա)	5
Aroghjaranin kits (Առողջարանին կից)	17
Bendik (Բենդիկ)	66
Chochkan (Ճոճկան)	1,962
Mets Ayrum (Մեծ Այրում)	620
Neghots (Նեղոց)	246
Pokr Ayrum (Փոքր Այրում)	214
Tumanyan Municipality
Marts (Մարց)	426
Karinj (Քարինջ)	604
Lorut (Լորուտ)	784
Shamut (Շամուտ)	236
Atan (Աթան)	204
Ahnidzor (Ահնիձոր)	195
Kobayr (Քոբայր)	15
Dsegh (Դսեղ)	2,043
Chkalov (Չկալով)	158
Spitak Municipality
Arjhovit (Արջհովիտ)	575
Arevashogh (Արևաշող)	2,512
Geghasar (Գեղասար)	899
Gogaran (Գոգարան)	1,265
Lernantsk (Լեռնանցք)	1,436
Lernavan (Լեռնավան)	1,678
Lusaghbyur (Լուսաղբյուր)	1,177
Khnkoyan (Խնկոյան)	293
Tsaghkaber (Ծաղկաբեր)	1,245
Katnajur (Կաթնաջուր)	1,961
Hartagyugh (Հարթագյուղ)	1,180
Mets Parni (Մեծ Պարնի)	2,195
Nor Khachakap (Նոր Խաչակապ)	597
Shenavan (Շենավան)	510
Shirakamut (Շիրակամուտ)	2,270
Jrashen (Ջրաշեն)	3,609
Saralanj (Սարալանջ)	197
Sarahart (Սարահարթ)	1,542
Saramej (Սարամեջ)	1,713
Karadzor (Քարաձոր)	467
Stepanavan Municipality
Armanis (Արմանիս)	259
Katnaghbyur (Կաթնաղբյուր)	629
Urasar (Ուրասար)	309
Tashir Municipality
Blagodarnoye (Բլագոդարնոյե)	212
Dashtadem (Դաշտադեմ)	86
Lernahovit (Լեռնահովիտ)	1,001
Katnarat (Կաթնառատ)	1,001
Medovka (Մեդովկա)	296
Kruglaya shishka (Կրուգլայա շիշկա)	87
Meghvahovit (Մեղվահովիտ)	94
Noramut (Նորամուտ)	36
Novoseltsovo (Նովոսելցովո)	185
Saratovka (Սարատովկա)	341
Getavan (Գետավան)	64
Gyulagarak Municipality
Gyulagarak (Գյուլագարակ)	2,280
Amrakits (Ամրակից)	495
Gargar (Գարգառ)	1,312
Kurtan (Կուրթան)	1,604
Hobardzi (Հոբարձի)	626
Pushkino (Պուշկինո)	330
Vardablur (Վարդաբլուր)	1,326
Lermontovo Municipality
Lermontovo (Լերմոնտովո)	876
Antarashen (Անտառաշեն)	241
Lori berd Municipality
Lori berd (Լոռի բերդ)	400
Agarak (Ագարակ)	1,195
Bovadzor (Բովաձոր)	252
Lejan (Լեջան)	693
Koghes (Կողես)	350
Hovnanadzor (Հովնանաձոր)	36
Yaghdan (Յաղդան)	319
Sverdlov (Սվերդլով)	927
Urut (Ուռուտ)	816
Metsavan Municipality
Metsavan (Մեծավան)	5,776
Dzyunashogh (Ձյունաշող)	114
Mikhayelovka (Միխայելովկա)	895
Paghaghbyur (Պաղաղբյուր)	96
Shnogh Municipality
Shnogh (Շնող)	2,941
Teghut (Թեղուտ)	793
Karkop (Քարկոփ)	377
Sarchapet Municipality
Sarchapet (Սարչապետ)	1,271
Apaven (Ապավեն)	87
Artsni (Արծնի)	427
Dzoramut (Ձորամուտ)	303
Gogavan (Գոգավան)	61
Petrovka (Պետրովկա)	177
Privolnoye (Պրիվոլնոյե)	886
Norashen (Նորաշեն)	893
Pambak Municipality
Pambak (Փամբակ)	365
Aznvadzor (Ազնվաձոր)	420
Antaramut (Անտառամուտ)	267
Arjut (Արջուտ)	1,230
Bazum (Բազում)	1,429
Gushar (Գուշար)	0
Debet (Դեբետ)	869
Yeghegnut (Եղեգնուտ)	814
Zhamatun (Ժամատուն)	0
Lernapat (Լեռնապատ)	1,966
Lernajur (Լեռնաջուր)	85
Tsaghkots (Ծաղկոց)	11
Margahovit (Մարգահովիտ)	3,569
Dzoraget (Ձորագետ)	243
Dzoragyugh (Ձորագյուղ)	252
Vahagnadzor (Վահագնաձոր)	323
Vahagni (Վահագնի)	1,006
Karaberd (Քարաբերդ)	60
Odzun Municipality
Odzun (Օձուն)	4,707
Amoj (Ամոջ)	134
Aygehat (Այգեհատ)	184
Ardvi (Արդվի)	145
Arevatsag (Արևածագ)	811
Tsater (Ծաթեր)	319
Karmir Aghek (Կարմիր Աղեկ)	129
Hagvi (Հագվի)	367
Mghart (Մղարթ)	301
Fioletovo Municipality
Fioletovo (Ֆիոլետովո)	1,258

== Shirak ==
The 3 urban settlements and 127 villages within the 5 municipalities of the Shirak Province are as follow:

Settlement name	Population
Urban settlements
Gyumri (Գյումրի)	111,138
Artik (Արթիկ)	17,601
Maralik (Մարալիկ)	5,335
Artik Municipality
Anushavan (Անուշավան)	2,143
Arevshat (Արևշատ)	1,916
Geghanist (Գեղանիստ)	1,393
Getap (Գետափ)	909
Lernakert (Լեռնակերտ)	1,404
Lusakert (Լուսակերտ)	649
Haykasar (Հայկասար)	220
Hayrenyats (Հայրենյաց)	755
Harich (Հառիճ)	1,160
Horom (Հոռոմ)	2,064
Hovtashen (Հովտաշեն)	299
Mets Mantash (Մեծ Մանթաշ)	2,455
Meghrashen (Մեղրաշեն)	1,248
Nahapetavan (Նահապետավան)	797
Nor Kyank (Նոր Կյանք)	1,547
Pemzashen (Պեմզաշեն)	3,388
Saralanj (Սարալանջ)	1,295
Saratak (Սարատակ)	1,375
Spandaryan (Սպանդարյան)	1,615
Vardakar (Վարդաքար)	696
Tufashen (Տուֆաշեն)	420
Panik (Փանիկ)	3,165
Pokr Mantash (Փոքր Մանթաշ)	2,984
Ani Municipality
Aghin (Աղին)	561
Aniavan (Անիավան)	194
Anipemza (Անիպեմզա)	299
Bagravan (Բագրավան)	810
Bardzrashen (Բարձրաշեն)	0
Gusanagyugh (Գուսանագյուղ)	914
Isahakyan (Իսահակյան)	1,083
Lanjik (Լանջիկ)	967
Lusaghbyur (Լուսաղբյուր)	657
Haykadzor (Հայկաձոր)	505
Dzithankov (Ձիթհանքով)	1,428
Dzorakap (Ձորակապ)	1,244
Shirakavan (Շիրակավան)	796
Norshen (Նորշեն)	0
Jrapi (Ջրափի)	845
Sarnaghbyur (Սառնաղբյուր)	3,526
Sarakap (Սարակապ)	597
Karaberd (Քարաբերդ)	1,174
Akhuryan Municipality
Akhuryan (Ախուրյան)	9,194
Aygabats (Այգաբաց)	756
Arevik (Արևիկ)	1,895
Basen (Բասեն)	1,250
Kamo (Կամո)	1,488
Karnut (Կառնուտ)	1,143
Hovit (Հովիտ)	562
Jrarat (Ջրառատ)	971
Azatan (Ազատան)	5,841
Akhurik (Ախուրիկ)	1,124
Akhuryan kayaran (Ախուրյան կայարան)	17
Arapi (Առափի)	1,697
Bayandur (Բայանդուր)	717
Beniamin (Բենիամին)	602
Getk (Գետք)	633
Yerazgavors (Երազգավորս)	1,300
Lernut (Լեռնուտ)	147
Kaps (Կապս)	640
Karmrakar (Կարմրաքար)	42
Krashen (Կրաշեն)	211
Haykavan (Հայկավան)	1,270
Hatsik (Հացիկ)	882
Hatsikavan (Հացիկավան)	56
Hovuni (Հովունի)	651
Gharibjanyan (Ղարիբջանյան)	995
Mayisyan (Մայիսյան)	1,332
Marmashen (Մարմաշեն)	1,770
Mets Sariar (Մեծ Սարիար)	315
Shirak (Շիրակ)	906
Voskehask (Ոսկեհասկ)	2,006
Jajur (Ջաջուռ)	656
Jajuravan (Ջաջուռավան)	173
Vahramaberd (Վահրամաբերդ)	904
Pokrashen (Փոքրաշեն)	198
Keti (Քեթի)	1,030
Amasia Municipality
Amasia (Ամասիա)	1,611
Aregnadem (Արեգնադեմ)	480
Bandivan (Բանդիվան)	224
Byurakn (Բյուրակն)	654
Gtashen (Գտաշեն)	209
Kamkhut (Կամխուտ)	11
Hovtun (Հովտուն)	159
Meghrashat (Մեղրաշատ)	363
Voghji (Ողջի)	378
Jradzor (Ջրաձոր)	238
Alvar (Ալվար)	126
Aghvorik (Աղվորիկ)	114
Aravet (Արավետ)	0
Ardenis (Արդենիս)	175
Berdashen (Բերդաշեն)	219
Garnarich (Գառնառիճ)	212
Darik (Դարիկ)	12
Yeghnajur (Եղնաջուր)	30
Yerizak (Երիզակ)	0
Zarishat (Զարիշատ)	78
Zorakert (Զորակերտ)	130
Lorasar (Լորասար)	0
Tsaghkut (Ծաղկուտ)	144
Hoghmik (Հողմիկ)	349
Shaghik (Շաղիկ)	82
Paghakn (Պաղակն)	84
Ashotsk Municipality
Ashotsk (Աշոցք)	2,725
Bavra (Բավրա)	664
Zuygaghbyur (Զույգաղբյուր)	510
Tavshut (Թավշուտ)	372
Karmravan (Կարմրավան)	229
Krasar (Կրասար)	513
Ghazanchi (Ղազանչի)	630
Mets Sepasar (Մեծ Սեպասար)	900
Saragyugh (Սարագյուղ)	248
Sizavet (Սիզավետ)	395
Pokr Sepasar (Փոքր Սեպասար)	195
Arpeni (Արփենի)	364
Bashgyugh (Բաշգյուղ)	56
Goghovit (Գոգհովիտ)	412
Torosgyugh (Թորոսգյուղ)	365
Lernagyugh (Լեռնագյուղ)	26
Kakavasar (Կաքավասար)	133
Hartashen (Հարթաշեն)	102
Dzorashen (Ձորաշեն)	219
Musayelyan (Մուսայելյան)	314
Salut (Սալուտ)	102
Sarapat (Սարապատ)	122
Vardaghbyur (Վարդաղբյուր)	141
Tsoghamarg (Ցողամարգ)	577
Pokr Sariar (Փոքր Սարիար)	234

== Syunik ==
The 7 urban settlements and 132 villages within the 8 municipalities of the Syunik Province are as follow:

Settlement name	Population
Urban settlements
Kapan (Կապան)	41,512
Goris (Գորիս)	19,664
Sisian (Սիսիան)	14,297
Kajaran (Քաջարան)	6,810
Meghri (Մեղրի)	4,193
Agarak (Ագարակ)	3,952
Dastakert (Դաստակերտ)	267
Kapan Municipality
Agarak (Ագարակ)	168
Aghvani (Աղվանի)	55
Achanan (Աճանան)	177
Antarashat (Անտառաշատ)	98
Arajadzor (Առաջաձոր)	105
Artsvanik (Արծվանիկ)	568
Bargushat (Բարգուշատ)	50
Geghanush (Գեղանուշ)	280
Gomaran (Գոմարան)	42
Davit Bek (Դավիթ Բեկ)	646
Ditsmayri (Դիցմայրի)	45
Yegheg (Եղեգ)	70
Yeghvard (Եղվարդ)	261
Khdrants (Խդրանց)	51
Khordzor (Խորձոր)	5
Tsav (Ծավ)	311
Kaghnut (Կաղնուտ)	87
Dzorastan (Ձորաստան)	60
Chakaten (Ճակատեն)	167
Nerkin Khotanan (Ներքին Խոտանան)	71
Nerkin Hand (Ներքին Հանդ)	94
Norashenik (Նորաշենիկ)	94
Shikahogh (Շիկահող)	213
Shishkert (Շիշկերտ)	37
Shrvenants (Շրվենանց)	63
Chapni (Չափնի)	105
Sznak (Սզնակ)	99
Syunik (Սյունիք)	587
Srashen (Սրաշեն)	88
Sevakar (Սևաքար)	157
Vanek (Վանեք)	54
Vardavank (Վարդավանք)	91
Verin Khotanan (Վերին Խոտանան)	206
Tandzaver (Տանձավեր)	159
Tavrus (Տավրուս)	84
Uzhanis (Ուժանիս)	94
Okhtar (Օխտար)	74
Erkenants (Ըրկենանց)	0
Goris Municipality
Akner (Ակներ)	1,119
Aghbulagh (Աղբուլաղ)	0
Bardzravan (Բարձրավան)	89
Khndzoresk (Խնձորեսկ)	2,145
Hartashen (Հարթաշեն)	682
Dzorak (Ձորակ)	0
Nerkin Khndzoresk (Ներքին Խնձորեսկ)	233
Shurnukh (Շուռնուխ)	146
Vorotan (Որոտան)	286
Vanand (Վանանդ)	0
Verishen (Վերիշեն)	2,080
Karahunj (Քարահունջ)	1,357
Meghri Municipality
Alvank (Ալվանք)	223
Aygedzor (Այգեձոր)	0
Gudemnis (Գուդեմնիս)	14
Tkhkut (Թխկուտ)	32
Lehvaz (Լեհվազ)	523
Lichk (Լիճք)	94
Karchevan (Կարճևան)	217
Kuris (Կուրիս)	29
Nrnadzor (Նռնաձոր)	120
Shvanidzor (Շվանիձոր)	254
Vahravar (Վահրավար)	17
Vardanidzor (Վարդանիձոր)	192
Tashtun (Տաշտուն)	104
Sisian Municipality
Akhlatyan (Ախլաթյան)	541
Aghitu (Աղիտու)	337
Angeghakot (Անգեղակոթ)	1,546
Ashotavan (Աշոտավան)	417
Arevis (Արևիս)	45
Balak (Բալաք)	146
Bnunis (Բնունիս)	111
Brnakot (Բռնակոթ)	1,748
Getatagh (Գետաթաղ)	143
Darbas (Դարբաս)	492
Tanahat (Թանահատ)	12
Tasik (Թասիկ)	255
Ishkhanasar (Իշխանասար)	195
Ltsen (Լծեն)	51
Lor (Լոր)	292
Hatsavan (Հացավան)	228
Mutsk (Մուցք)	150
Nzhdeh (Նժդեհ)	61
Noravan (Նորավան)	348
Shaghat (Շաղատ)	762
Shamb (Շամբ)	413
Shaki (Շաքի)	1,114
Shenatagh (Շենաթաղ)	310
Vorotnavan (Որոտնավան)	250
Salvard (Սալվարդ)	204
Vaghatin (Վաղատին)	457
Tolors (Տոլորս)	397
Torunik (Տորունիք)	83
Tsghuni (Ցղունի)	30
Uyts (Ույծ)	412
Kajaran Municipality
Andokavan (Անդոկավան)	91
Ajabaj (Աջաբաջ)	12
Babikavan (Բաբիկավան)	215
Geghavank (Գեղավանք)	3
Geghi (Գեղի)	119
Getishen (Գետիշեն)	60
Lernadzor (Լեռնաձոր)	333
Katnarat (Կաթնառատ)	19
Kavchut (Կավճուտ)	55
Kard (Կարդ)	0
Kitsk (Կիցք)	0
Dzagikavan (Ձագիկավան)	53
Nerkin Giratagh (Ներքին Գիրաթաղ)	0
Nor Astghaberd (Նոր Աստղաբերդ)	37
Vocheti (Ոչեթի)	0
Verin Geghavank (Վերին Գեղավանք)	0
Verin Giratagh (Վերին Գիրաթաղ)	0
Pukhrut (Փուխրուտ)	12
Kajaran (Քաջարան)	196
Karut (Քարուտ)	0
Gorayk Municipality
Gorayk (Գորայք)	432
Tsghuk (Ծղուկ)	290
Sarnakunk (Սառնակունք)	461
Spandaryan (Սպանդարյան)	267
Tatev Municipality
Shinuhayr (Շինուհայր)	2,579
Tatev (Տաթև)	814
Halidzor (Հալիձոր)	612
Harzhis (Հարժիս)	727
Svarants (Սվարանց)	254
Khot (Խոտ)	919
Tandzatap (Տանձատափ)	80
Kashuni (Քաշունի)	11
Tegh Municipality
Tegh (Տեղ)	2,206
Aravus (Արավուս)	167
Khnatsakh (Խնածախ)	734
Khoznavar (Խոզնավար)	357
Kornidzor (Կոռնիձոր)	1,041
Vaghatur (Վաղատուր)	408
Karashen (Քարաշեն)	480

== Tavush ==
The 5 urban settlements and 60 villages within the 4 municipalities of the Tavush Province are as follow:

Settlement name	Population
Urban settlements
Ijevan (Իջևան)	19,773
Dilijan (Դիլիջան)	17,045
Berd (Բերդ)	6,990
Noyemberyan (Նոյեմբերյան)	4,373
Ayrum (Այրում)	1,746
Ijevan Municipality
Azatamut (Ազատամուտ)	2,862
Aknaghbyur (Ակնաղբյուր)	501
Acharkut (Աճարկուտ)	172
Aygehovit (Այգեհովիտ)	3,191
Achajur (Աչաջուր)	4,195
Berkaber (Բերքաբեր)	377
Gandzakar (Գանձաքար)	3,519
Getahovit (Գետահովիտ)	2,093
Ditavan (Դիտավան)	371
Yenokavan (Ենոքավան)	501
Lusahovit (Լուսահովիտ)	316
Lusadzor (Լուսաձոր)	657
Khashtarak (Խաշթառակ)	1,813
Tsaghkavan (Ծաղկավան)	506
Kayan (Կայան)	290
Kirants (Կիրանց)	315
Sarigyugh (Սարիգյուղ)	1,227
Sevkar (Սևքար)	2,108
Vazashen (Վազաշեն)	870
Berd Municipality
Aygedzor (Այգեձոր)	1,638
Aygepar (Այգեպար)	385
Artsvaberd (Արծվաբերդ)	2,824
Itsakar (Իծաքար)	274
Verin Tsaghkavan (Վերին Ծաղկավան)	780
Movses (Մովսես)	1,443
Navur (Նավուր)	1,039
Nerkin Karmiraghbyur (Ներքին Կարմիրաղբյուր)	789
Norashen (Նորաշեն)	1,371
Chinari (Չինարի)	813
Chinchin (Չինչին)	387
Choratan (Չորաթան)	708
Paravakar (Պառավաքար)	1,532
Varagavan (Վարագավան)	491
Verin Karmiraghbyur (Վերին Կարմիրաղբյուր)	1,507
Tavush (Տավուշ)	1,470
Dilijan Municipality
Haghartsin (Հաղարծին)	3,499
Teghut (Թեղուտ)	1,440
Gosh (Գոշ)	1,096
Aghavnavank (Աղավնավանք)	237
Hovk (Հովք)	428
Khachardzan (Խաչարձան)	352
Chermakavan (Ճերմակավան)	0
Geghatap (Գեղատափ)	0
Noyemberyan Municipality
Baghanis (Բաղանիս)	841
Barekamavan (Բարեկամավան)	163
Berdavan (Բերդավան)	3,247
Dovegh (Դովեղ)	550
Koti (Կոթի)	1,930
Voskepar (Ոսկեպար)	723
Voskevan (Ոսկեվան)	1,343
Jujevan (Ջուջևան)	465
Archis (Արճիս)	1,060
Bagratashen (Բագրատաշեն)	2,842
Debedavan (Դեբեդավան)	553
Deghdzavan (Դեղձավան)	297
Zorakan (Զորական)	818
Lchkadzor (Լճկաձոր)	404
Koghb (Կողբ)	4,601
Haghtanak (Հաղթանակ)	1,140
Ptghavan (Պտղավան)	781

== Vayots Dzor ==
The 3 urban settlements and 52 villages within the 5 municipalities of the Vayots Dzor Province are as follow:

Settlement name	Population
Urban settlements
Yeghegnadzor (Եղեգնաձոր)	7,040
Vayk (Վայք)	5,349
Jermuk (Ջերմուկ)	3,902
Yeghegnadzor Municipality
Getap (Գետափ)	2,239
Gladzor (Գլաձոր)	2,441
Malishka (Մալիշկա)	5,005
Vernashen (Վերնաշեն)	1,102
Jermuk Municipality
Gndevaz (Գնդեվազ)	715
Kechut (Կեչուտ)	885
Vayk Municipality
Azatek (Ազատեկ)	527
Arin (Արին)	273
Zedea (Զեդեա)	136
Horadis (Հորադիս)	0
Por (Փոռ)	111
Akhta (Ախտա)	0
Artavan (Արտավան)	256
Bardzruni (Բարձրունի)	351
Gomk (Գոմք)	153
Zaritap (Զառիթափ)	1,365
Khndzorut (Խնձորուտ)	465
Kapuyt (Կապույտ)	27
Karmrashen (Կարմրաշեն)	192
Herher (Հերհեր)	610
Martiros (Մարտիրոս)	568
Nor Aznaberd (Նոր Ազնաբերդ)	106
Saravan (Սարավան)	223
Sers (Սերս)	190
Ughedzor (Ուղեձոր)	0
Areni Municipality
Areni (Արենի)	1,964
Agarakadzor (Ագարակաձոր)	1,339
Aghavnadzor (Աղավնաձոր)	1,936
Arpi (Արփի)	1,101
Amaghu (Ամաղու)	0
Gnishik (Գնիշիկ)	61
Yelpin (Ելփին)	1,231
Khachik (Խաչիկ)	938
Mozrov (Մոզրով)	90
Chiva (Չիվա)	800
Rind (Ռինդ)	1,480
Yeghegis Municipality
Shatin (Շատին)	1,780
Aghnjadzor (Աղնջաձոր)	457
Arates (Արատես)	0
Artabuynk (Արտաբույնք)	1,084
Getikvank (Գետիկվանք)	0
Goghtanik (Գողթանիկ)	137
Yeghegis (Եղեգիս)	364
Taratumb (Թառաթումբ)	431
Kalasar (Կալասար)	0
Hermon (Հերմոն)	188
Horbategh (Հորբատեղ)	251
Hors (Հորս)	214
Salli (Սալլի)	243
Sevazhayr (Սևաժայռ)	28
Vardahovit (Վարդահովիտ)	199
Karaglukh (Քարագլուխ)	774

== Bibliography ==
- "ՄԱՅՐԱՔԱՂԱՔ ԵՐԵՎԱՆ" [Capital city – Yerevan]. ՀՀ ՄԱՐԶԵՐԻ ԵՎ ԵՐԵՎԱՆ ՔԱՂԱՔԻ ՍՈՑԻԱԼ-ՏՆՏԵՍԱԿԱՆ ԲՆՈՒԹԱԳՐԵՐԸ [Socio-economic characteristics of the provinces of the Republic of Armenia and the city of Yerevan] (PDF). Yerevan: Statistical Committee of Armenia. 15 November 2022. Archived (PDF) from the original on 9 February 2023.
- "ԱՐԱԳԱԾՈՏՆԻ ՄԱՐԶ" [Aragatsotn Province]. ՀՀ ՄԱՐԶԵՐԻ ԵՎ ԵՐԵՎԱՆ ՔԱՂԱՔԻ ՍՈՑԻԱԼ-ՏՆՏԵՍԱԿԱՆ ԲՆՈՒԹԱԳՐԵՐԸ [Socio-economic characteristics of the provinces of the Republic of Armenia and the city of Yerevan] (PDF). Yerevan: Statistical Committee of Armenia. 15 November 2022. Archived (PDF) from the original on 9 February 2023.
- "ԱՐԱՐԱՏԻ ՄԱՐԶ" [Ararat Province]. ՀՀ ՄԱՐԶԵՐԻ ԵՎ ԵՐԵՎԱՆ ՔԱՂԱՔԻ ՍՈՑԻԱԼ-ՏՆՏԵՍԱԿԱՆ ԲՆՈՒԹԱԳՐԵՐԸ [Socio-economic characteristics of the provinces of the Republic of Armenia and the city of Yerevan] (PDF). Yerevan: Statistical Committee of Armenia. 15 November 2022. Archived (PDF) from the original on 9 February 2023.
- "ԱՐՄԱՎԻՐԻ ՄԱՐԶ" [Armavir Province]. ՀՀ ՄԱՐԶԵՐԻ ԵՎ ԵՐԵՎԱՆ ՔԱՂԱՔԻ ՍՈՑԻԱԼ-ՏՆՏԵՍԱԿԱՆ ԲՆՈՒԹԱԳՐԵՐԸ [Socio-economic characteristics of the provinces of the Republic of Armenia and the city of Yerevan] (PDF). Yerevan: Statistical Committee of Armenia. 15 November 2022. Archived (PDF) from the original on 9 February 2023.
- "ԳԵՂԱՐՔՈՒՆԻՔԻ ՄԱՐԶ" [Gegharkunik Province]. ՀՀ ՄԱՐԶԵՐԻ ԵՎ ԵՐԵՎԱՆ ՔԱՂԱՔԻ ՍՈՑԻԱԼ-ՏՆՏԵՍԱԿԱՆ ԲՆՈՒԹԱԳՐԵՐԸ [Socio-economic characteristics of the provinces of the Republic of Armenia and the city of Yerevan] (PDF). Yerevan: Statistical Committee of Armenia. 15 November 2022. Archived (PDF) from the original on 9 February 2023.
- "ԼՈՌՈՒ ՄԱՐԶ" [Lori Province]. ՀՀ ՄԱՐԶԵՐԻ ԵՎ ԵՐԵՎԱՆ ՔԱՂԱՔԻ ՍՈՑԻԱԼ-ՏՆՏԵՍԱԿԱՆ ԲՆՈՒԹԱԳՐԵՐԸ [Socio-economic characteristics of the provinces of the Republic of Armenia and the city of Yerevan] (PDF). Yerevan: Statistical Committee of Armenia. 15 November 2022. Archived (PDF) from the original on 9 February 2023.
- "ԿՈՏԱՅՔԻ ՄԱՐԶ" [Kotayk Province]. ՀՀ ՄԱՐԶԵՐԻ ԵՎ ԵՐԵՎԱՆ ՔԱՂԱՔԻ ՍՈՑԻԱԼ-ՏՆՏԵՍԱԿԱՆ ԲՆՈՒԹԱԳՐԵՐԸ [Socio-economic characteristics of the provinces of the Republic of Armenia and the city of Yerevan] (PDF). Yerevan: Statistical Committee of Armenia. 15 November 2022. Archived (PDF) from the original on 9 February 2023.
- "ՇԻՐԱԿԻ ՄԱՐԶ" [Shirak Province]. ՀՀ ՄԱՐԶԵՐԻ ԵՎ ԵՐԵՎԱՆ ՔԱՂԱՔԻ ՍՈՑԻԱԼ-ՏՆՏԵՍԱԿԱՆ ԲՆՈՒԹԱԳՐԵՐԸ [Socio-economic characteristics of the provinces of the Republic of Armenia and the city of Yerevan] (PDF). Yerevan: Statistical Committee of Armenia. 15 November 2022. Archived (PDF) from the original on 9 February 2023.
- "ՍՅՈՒՆԻՔԻ ՄԱՐԶ" [Syunik Province]. ՀՀ ՄԱՐԶԵՐԻ ԵՎ ԵՐԵՎԱՆ ՔԱՂԱՔԻ ՍՈՑԻԱԼ-ՏՆՏԵՍԱԿԱՆ ԲՆՈՒԹԱԳՐԵՐԸ [Socio-economic characteristics of the provinces of the Republic of Armenia and the city of Yerevan] (PDF). Yerevan: Statistical Committee of Armenia. 15 November 2022. Archived (PDF) from the original on 9 February 2023.
- "ՎԱՅՈՑ ՁՈՐԻ ՄԱՐԶ" [Vayots Dzor Province]. ՀՀ ՄԱՐԶԵՐԻ ԵՎ ԵՐԵՎԱՆ ՔԱՂԱՔԻ ՍՈՑԻԱԼ-ՏՆՏԵՍԱԿԱՆ ԲՆՈՒԹԱԳՐԵՐԸ [Socio-economic characteristics of the provinces of the Republic of Armenia and the city of Yerevan] (PDF). Yerevan: Statistical Committee of Armenia. 15 November 2022. Archived (PDF) from the original on 9 February 2023.
- "ՏԱՎՈՒՇԻ ՄԱՐԶ" [Tavush Province]. ՀՀ ՄԱՐԶԵՐԻ ԵՎ ԵՐԵՎԱՆ ՔԱՂԱՔԻ ՍՈՑԻԱԼ-ՏՆՏԵՍԱԿԱՆ ԲՆՈՒԹԱԳՐԵՐԸ [Socio-economic characteristics of the provinces of the Republic of Armenia and the city of Yerevan] (PDF). Yerevan: Statistical Committee of Armenia. 15 November 2022. Archived (PDF) from the original on 9 February 2023.
