= Lernagyugh =

Lernagyugh Լեռնագյուղ
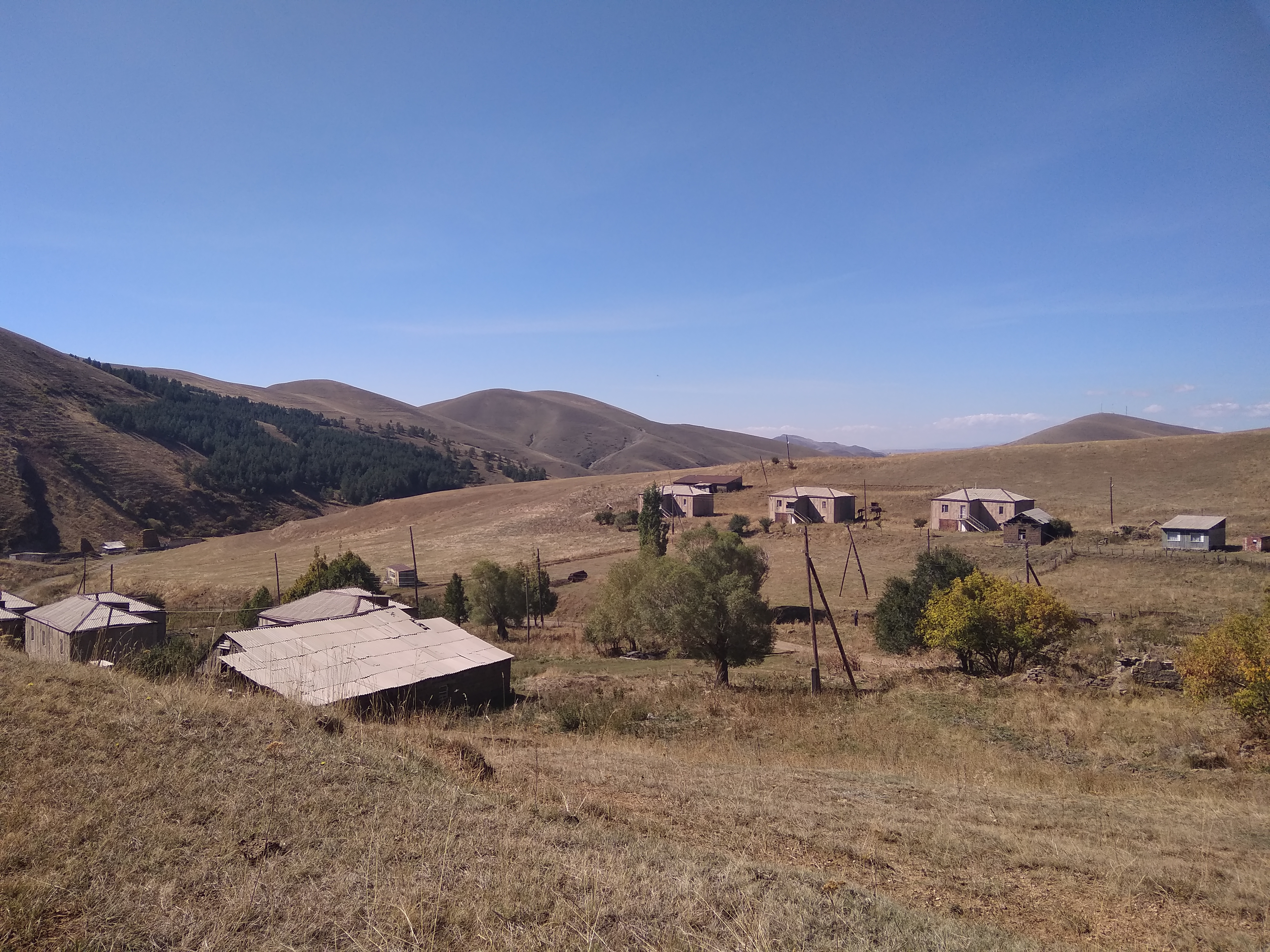
- Լեռնագյուղ

- Location within Armenia Location within Shirak
- Coordinates: 40°57′N 43°55′E
- Country: Armenia
- Province: Shirak
- Municipality: Ashotsk

Population (2011)
  - Total: 25
- Time zone: UTC+4
  - Summer (DST): UTC+5

Lernagyugh (Armenian: Լեռնագյուղ) is a village in the Ashotsk Municipality of the Shirak Province of Armenia.

== Demographics ==
Historical population
Year	Pop.	±% p.a.
1831	28	—
1897	520	+4.53%
1926	366	−1.20%
1939	539	+3.02%
1959	135	−6.69%
1979	66	−3.51%
2001	42	−2.03%
2011	25	−5.06%
