= Koghes =

Koghes Կողես
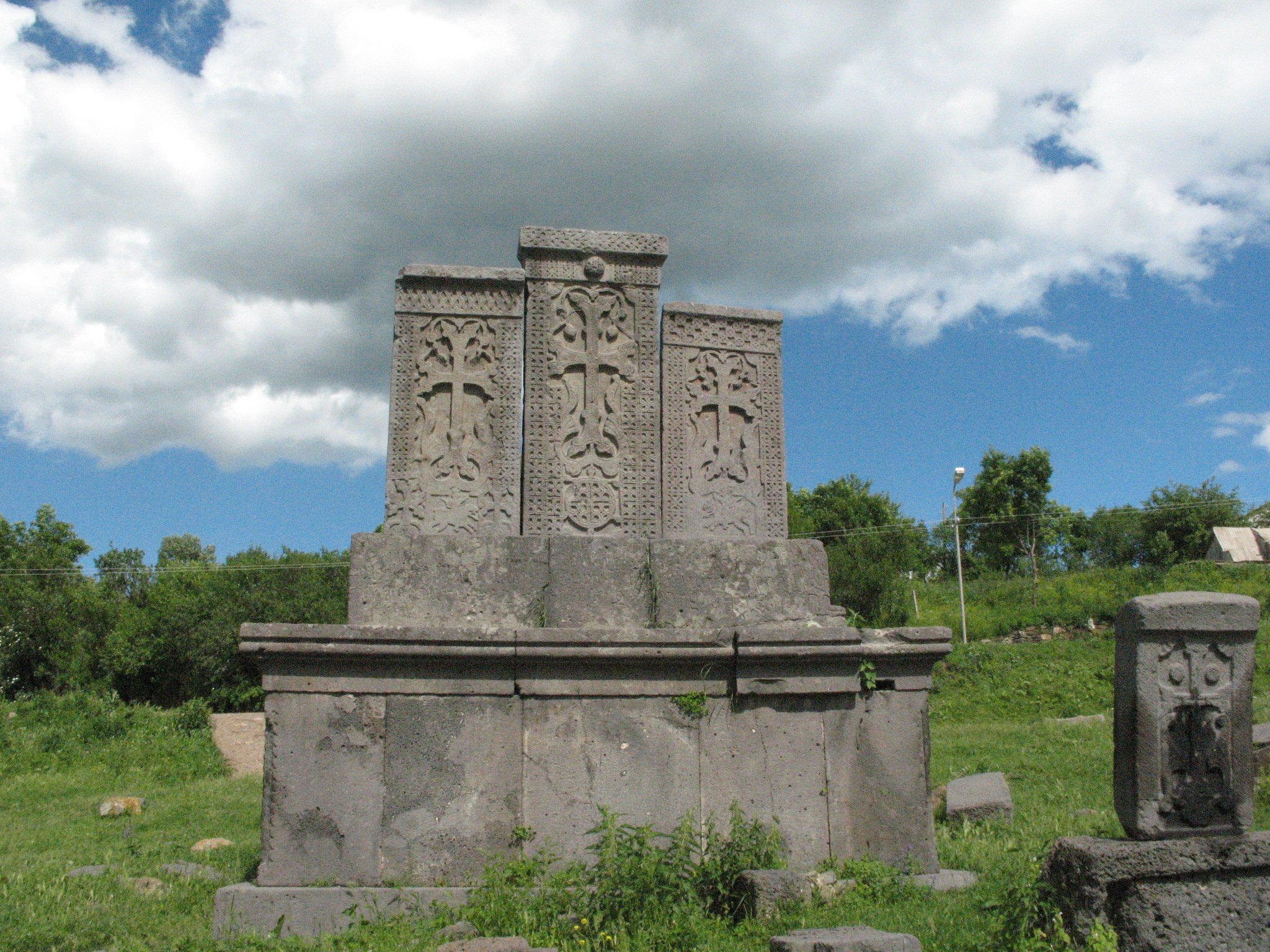

- Location within Armenia
- Coordinates: 40°59′15″N 44°32′05″E
- Country: Armenia
- Province: Lori
- Elevation: 1,310 m (4,300 ft)

Population (2011)
  - Total: 381
- Time zone: UTC+4 (AMT)

Koghes (Armenian: Կողես) is a village in the Lori Province of Armenia.

== Toponymy ==
The village was previously known as Karmir Aghek (Armenian: Կարմիր Աղեկ).

== History ==
The village was previously populated by Pontic Greeks.

== Gallery ==
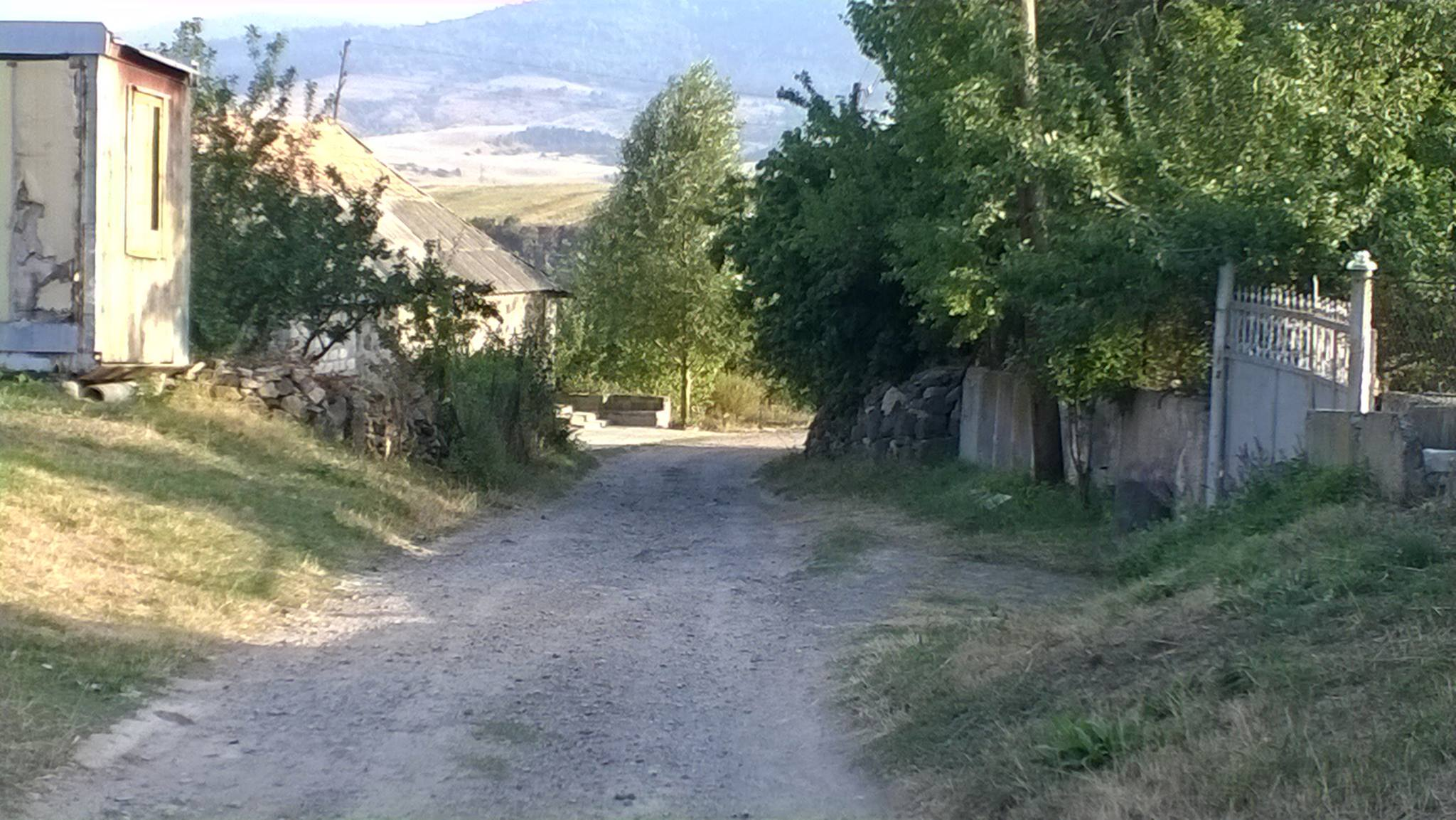
