= Arevashogh =

Arevashogh Արևաշող
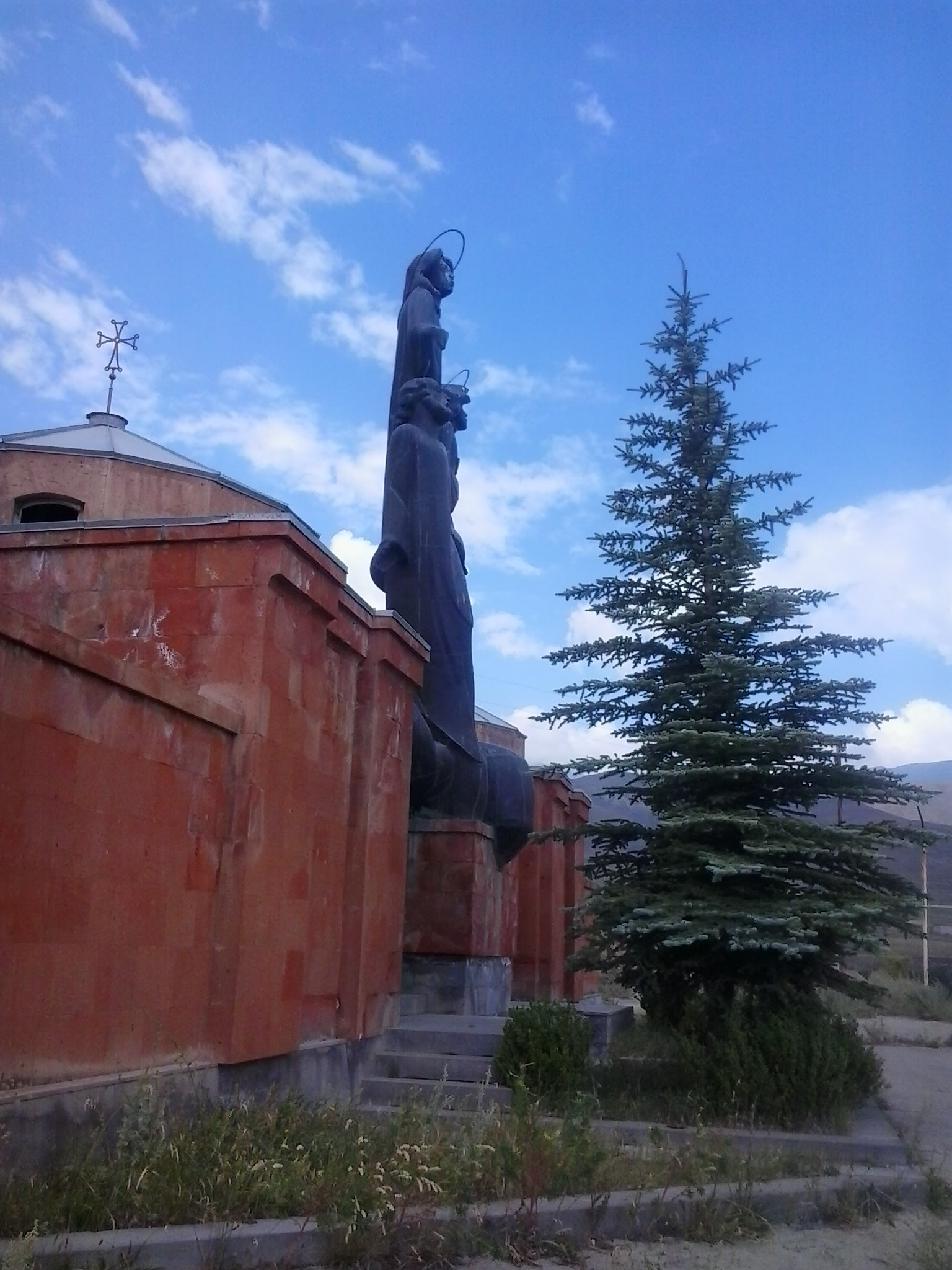
- Arevashogh

- Location within Armenia
- Coordinates: 40°51′41″N 44°16′22″E
- Country: Armenia
- Province: Lori
- Elevation: 1,930 m (6,330 ft)

Population (2011)
  - Total: 2,515
- Time zone: UTC+4
  - Summer (DST): UTC+5

Arevashogh (Armenian: Արևաշող, also Romanized as Arevashokh) is a town in the Lori Province of Armenia.
