= Hovuni =

Hovuni Հովունի
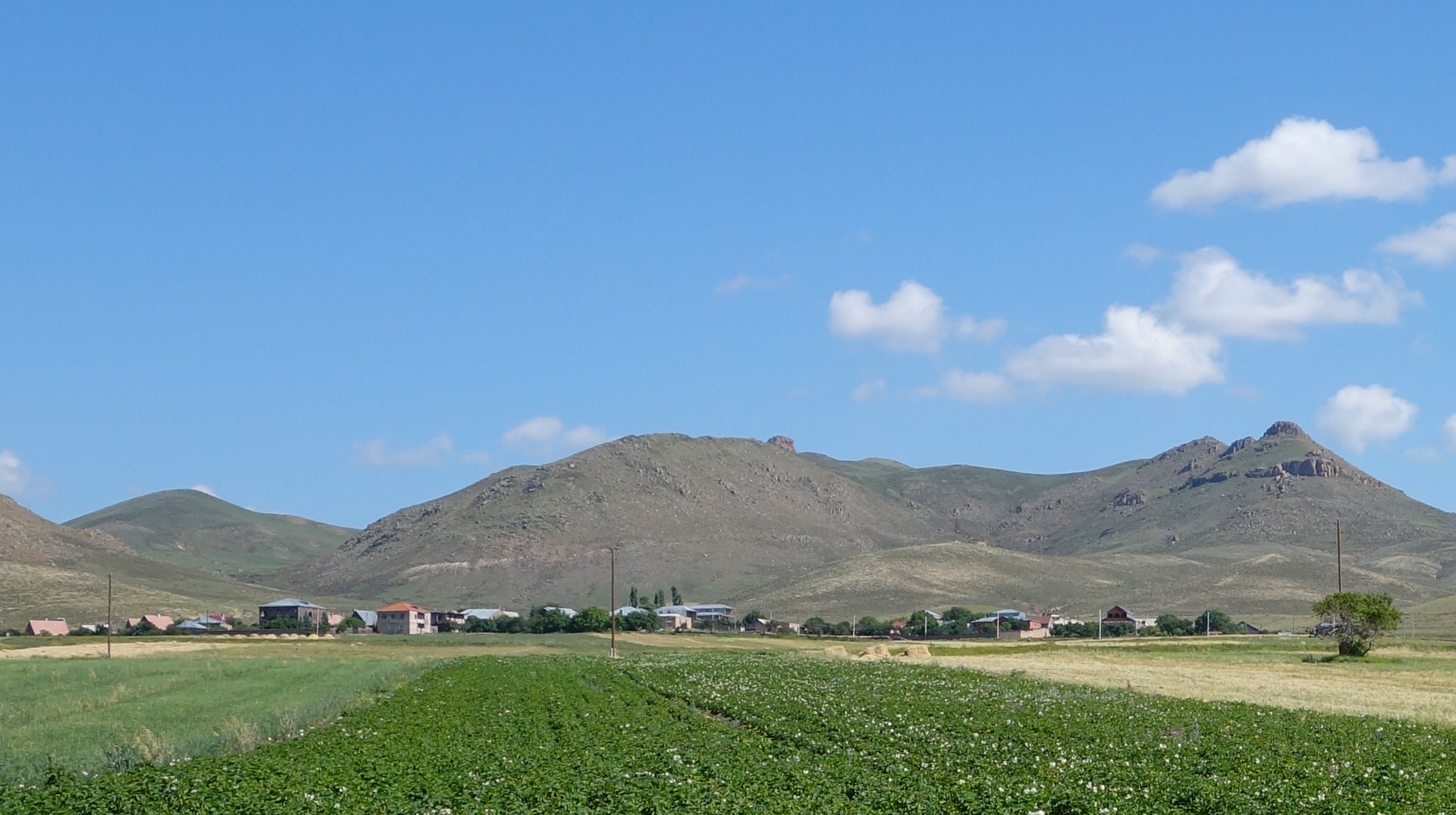

- Location within Armenia Location within Shirak
- Coordinates: 40°52′N 43°48′E
- Country: Armenia
- Province: Shirak
- Municipality: Akhuryan

Population (2011)
  - Total: 620
- Time zone: UTC+4

Hovuni (Armenian: Հովունի) is a village in the Akhuryan Municipality of the Shirak Province of Armenia.

== Demographics ==
The population of the village since 1831 is as follows:

Historical population
Year	Pop.	±% p.a.
1831	332	—
1926	165	−0.73%
1939	331	+5.50%
1959	412	+1.10%
1970	455	+0.91%
1979	475	+0.48%
1989	688	+3.77%
2001	687	−0.01%
2011	620	−1.02%
