= Neghots =

Neghots Նեղոց
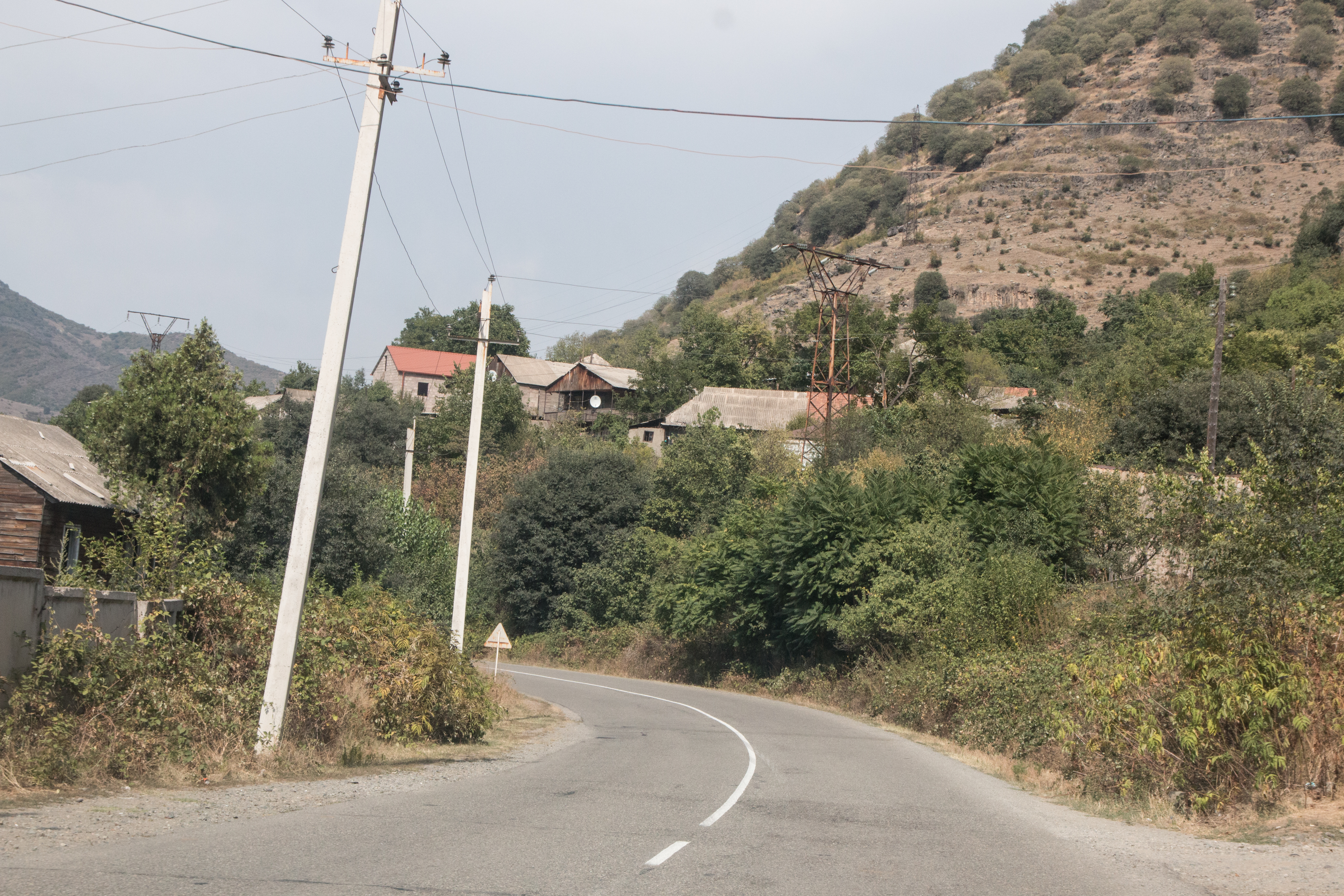

- Location within Armenia
- Coordinates: 41°08′N 44°47′E
- Country: Armenia
- Province: Lori
- Elevation: 550 m (1,800 ft)

Population (2011)
  - Total: 292
- Time zone: UTC+4 (AMT)

Neghots (Armenian: Նեղոց) is a village in the Lori Province of Armenia.

== Gallery ==
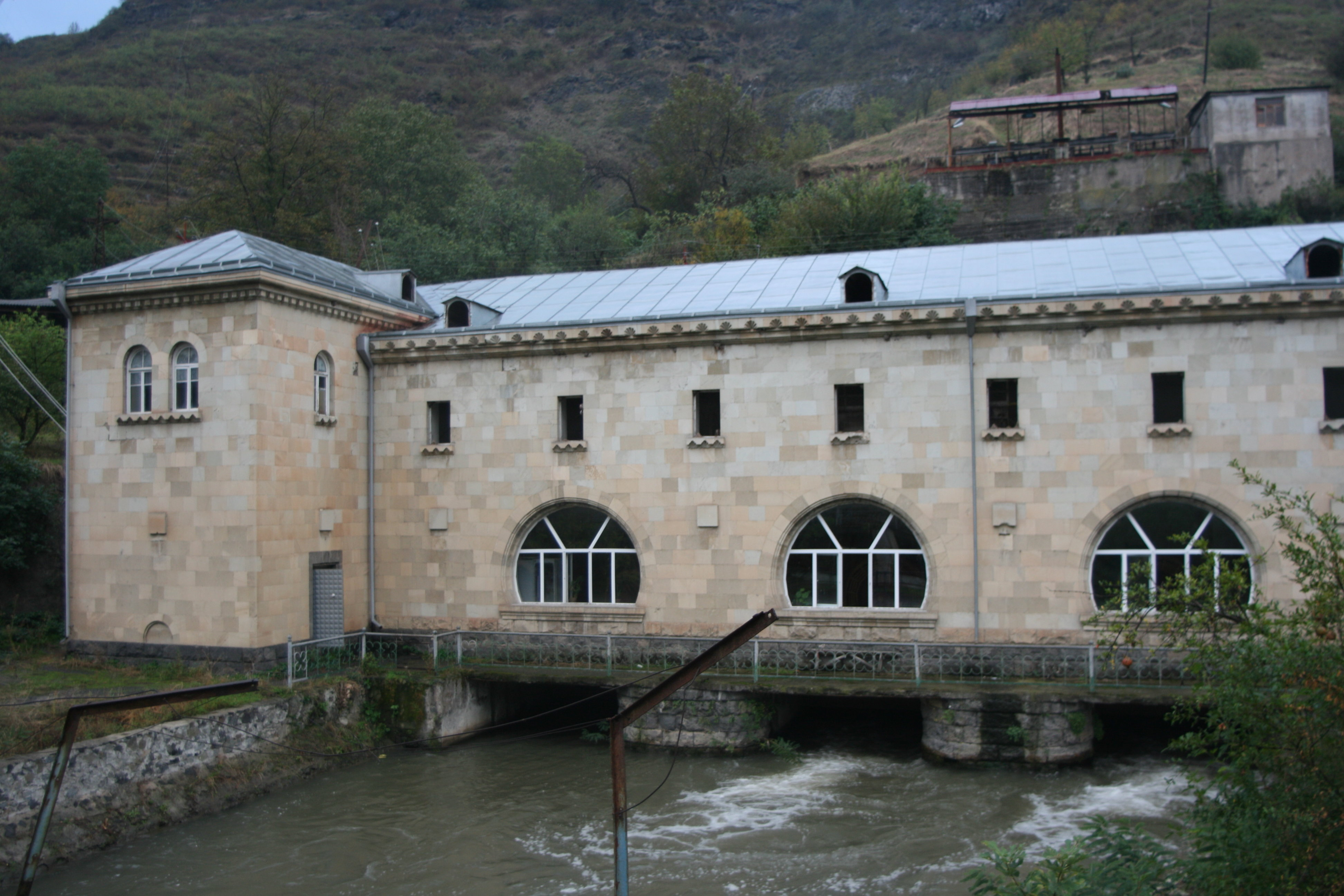
