= Hatsikavan =

Hatsikavan Հացիկավան
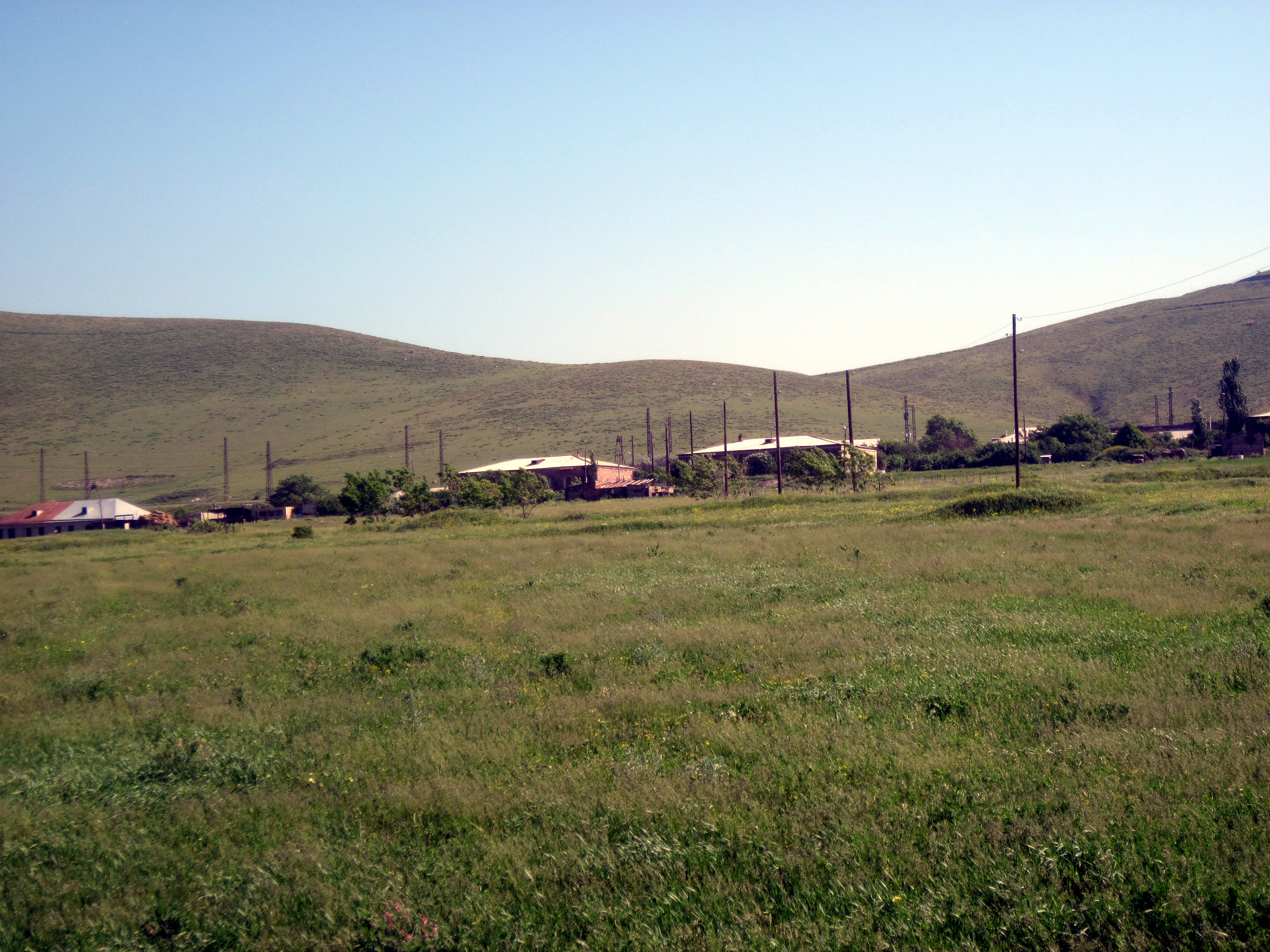
- Hatsikavan

- Location within Armenia Location within Shirak
- Coordinates: 40°51′9″N 43°51′40″E
- Country: Armenia
- Province: Shirak
- Municipality: Akhuryan

Population (2011)
  - Total: 71
- Time zone: UTC+4

Hatsikavan (Armenian: Հացիկավան) is a village in the Akhuryan Municipality of the Shirak Province of Armenia. It located 2 km northwest from Hatsik village.

== Demographics ==
The population of the village since 1926 is as follows:

Historical population
Year	Pop.	±% p.a.
1926	40	—
1939	40	+0.00%
1959	98	+4.58%
1979	33	−5.30%
2001	63	+2.98%
2011	71	+1.20%
