= Salut, Armenia =

Village in Shirak, Armenia

Salut Սալուտ
- Location within Armenia Location within Shirak
- Coordinates: 40°58′N 43°56′E
- Country: Armenia
- Province: Shirak
- Municipality: Ashotsk

Population (2011)
  - Total: 91
- Time zone: UTC+4
  - Summer (DST): UTC+5

Salut (Armenian: Սալուտ) is a village in the Ashotsk Municipality of the Shirak Province of Armenia.

== Demographics ==
The population of the village since 1897 is as follows:

Historical population
Year	Pop.	±% p.a.
1897	110	—
1908	160	+3.46%
1926	125	−1.36%
1931	167	+5.96%
1939	212	+3.03%
1959	87	−4.36%
1970	86	−0.11%
1979	79	−0.94%
1989	67	−1.63%
2001	94	+2.86%
2011	91	−0.32%
