= Sizavet =

Sizavet Սիզավետ
- Location within Armenia Location within Shirak
- Coordinates: 41°06′18″N 43°50′28″E
- Country: Armenia
- Province: Shirak
- Municipality: Ashotsk

Population (2011)
  - Total: 334
- Time zone: UTC+4
  - Summer (DST): UTC+5

Sizavet (Armenian: Սիզավետ) is a village in the Ashotsk Municipality of the Shirak Province of Armenia.

== Demographics ==
The population of the village since 1873 is as follows:

Historical population
Year	Pop.	±% p.a.
1873	294	—
1897	729	+3.86%
1926	1,031	+1.20%
1931	481	−14.14%
1939	1,300	+13.23%
1959	345	−6.42%
1970	321	−0.65%
1979	303	−0.64%
1989	375	+2.15%
2001	318	−1.36%
2011	334	+0.49%
