= Kakavasar =

Kakavasar Կաքավասար
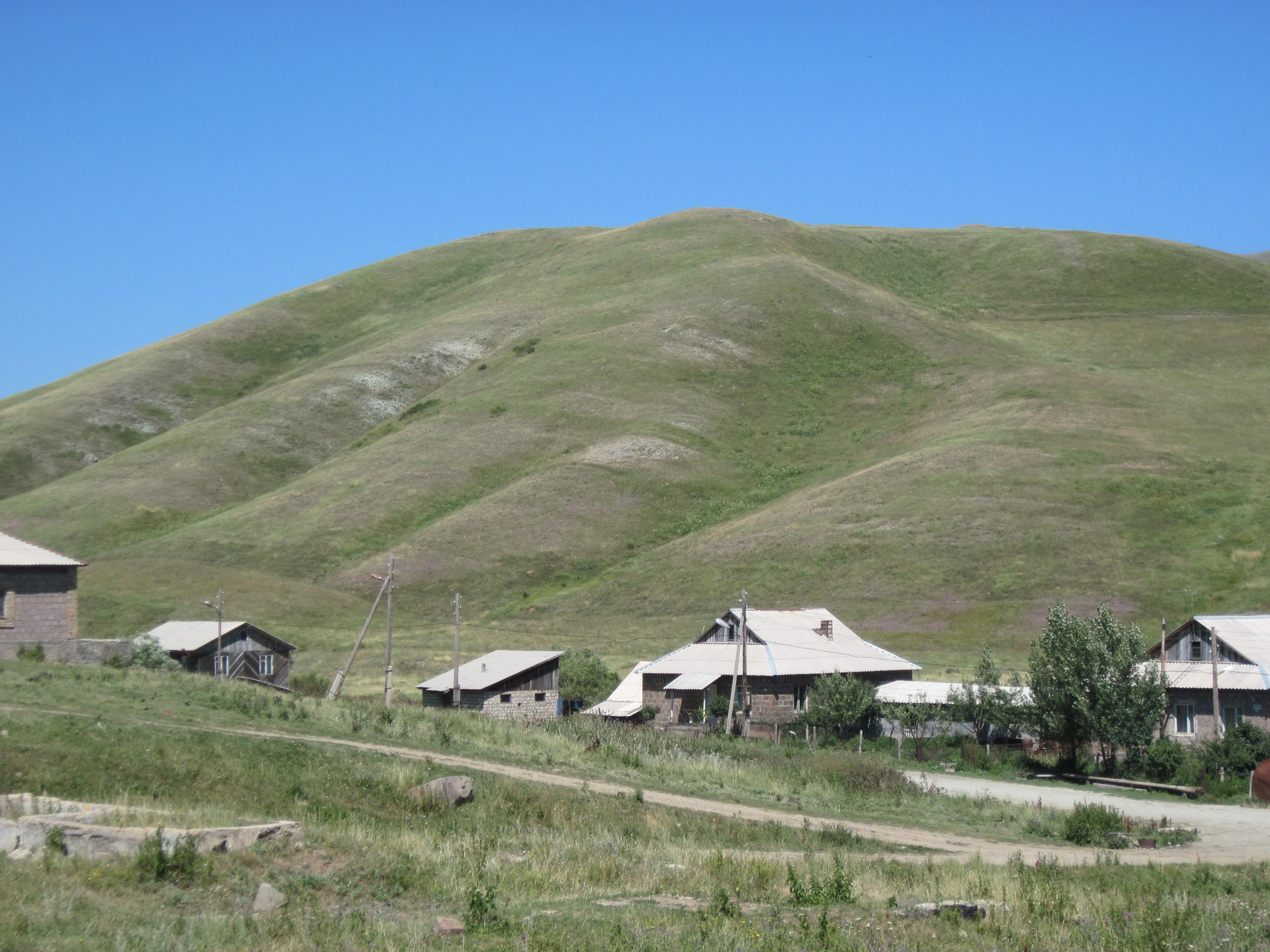

- Location within Armenia Location within Shirak
- Coordinates: 40°55′N 44°02′E
- Country: Armenia
- Province: Shirak
- Municipality: Ashotsk

Population (2011)
  - Total: 128
- Time zone: UTC+4

Kakavasar (Armenian: Կաքավասար) is a village in the Ashotsk Municipality of the Shirak Province of Armenia.

== Demographics ==
The population of the village since 1873 is as follows:

Historical population
Year	Pop.	±% p.a.
1873	206	—
1897	287	+1.39%
1926	281	−0.07%
1939	414	+3.03%
1959	217	−3.18%
1970	232	+0.61%
1979	176	−3.02%
2001	151	−0.69%
2011	128	−1.64%
