= Lejan =

Lejan Լեջան
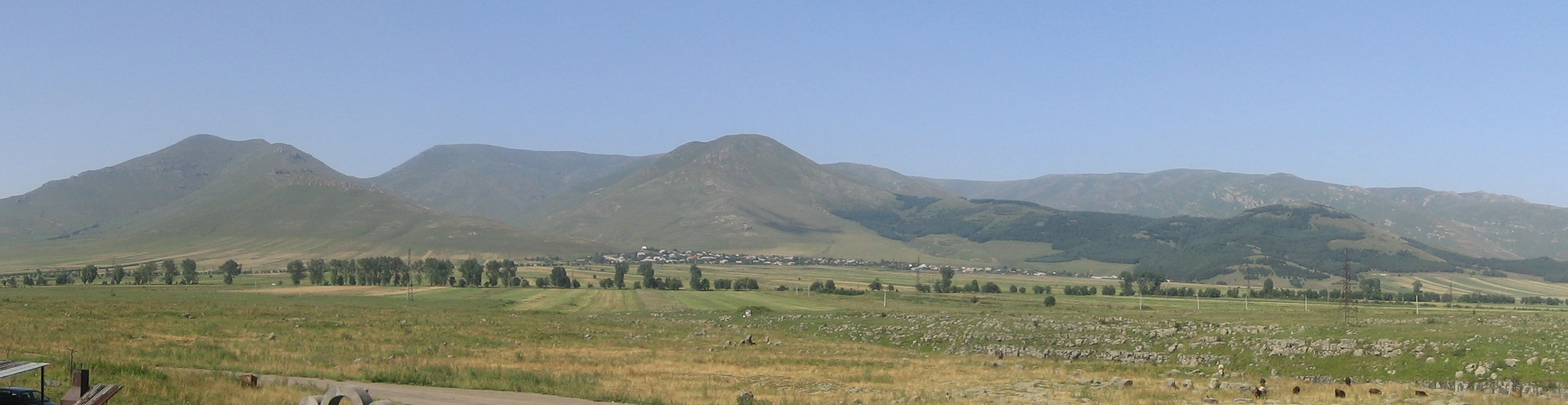
- Lejan as seen from the medieval fortress at Lori Berd

- Location within Armenia
- Coordinates: 41°01′49″N 44°26′31″E
- Country: Armenia
- Province: Lori
- Elevation: 1,470 m (4,820 ft)

Population (2011)
  - Total: 837
- Time zone: UTC+4 (AMT)

Lejan (Armenian: Լեջան) is a village in the Lori Province of Armenia.

== Gallery ==
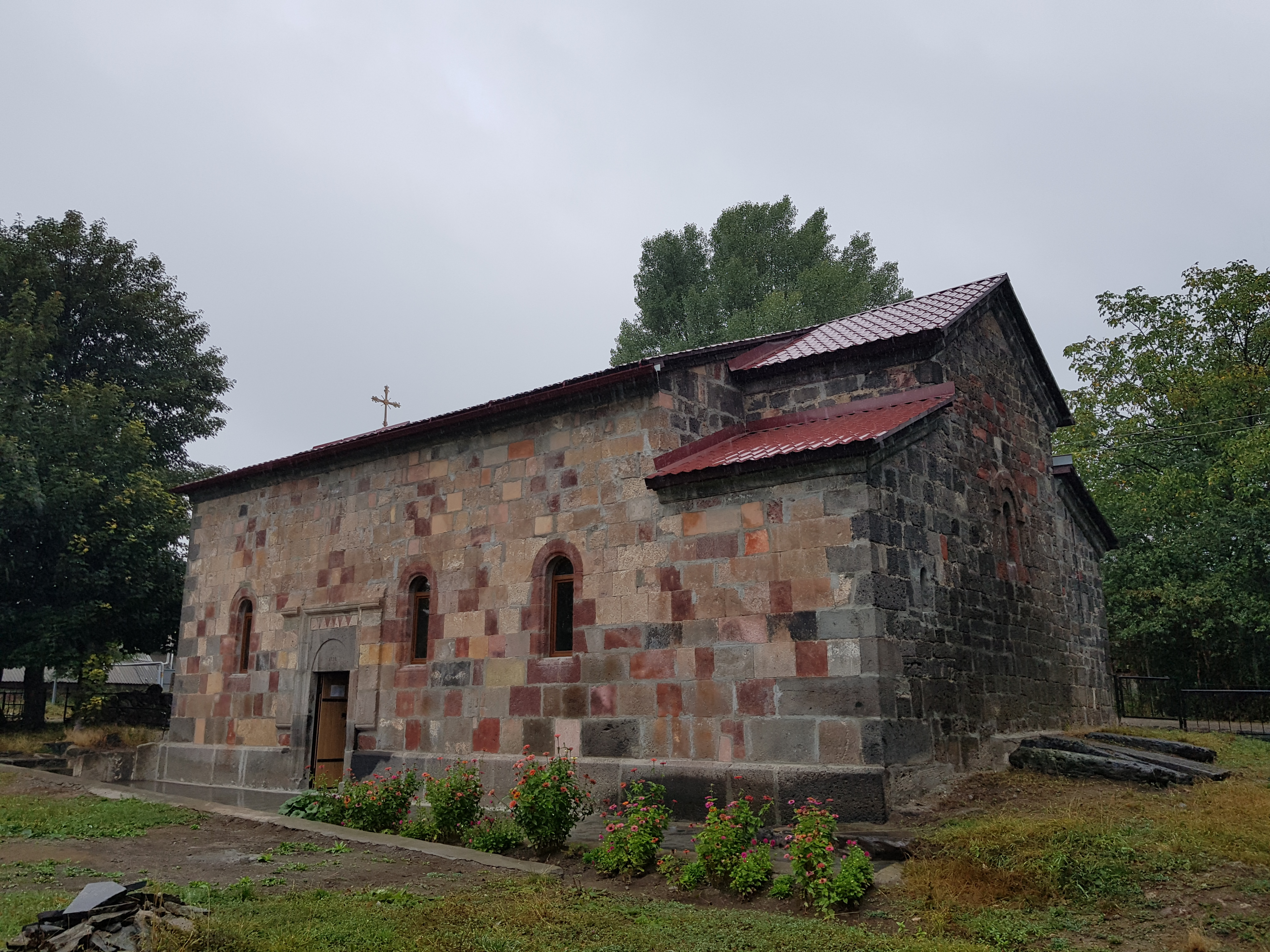

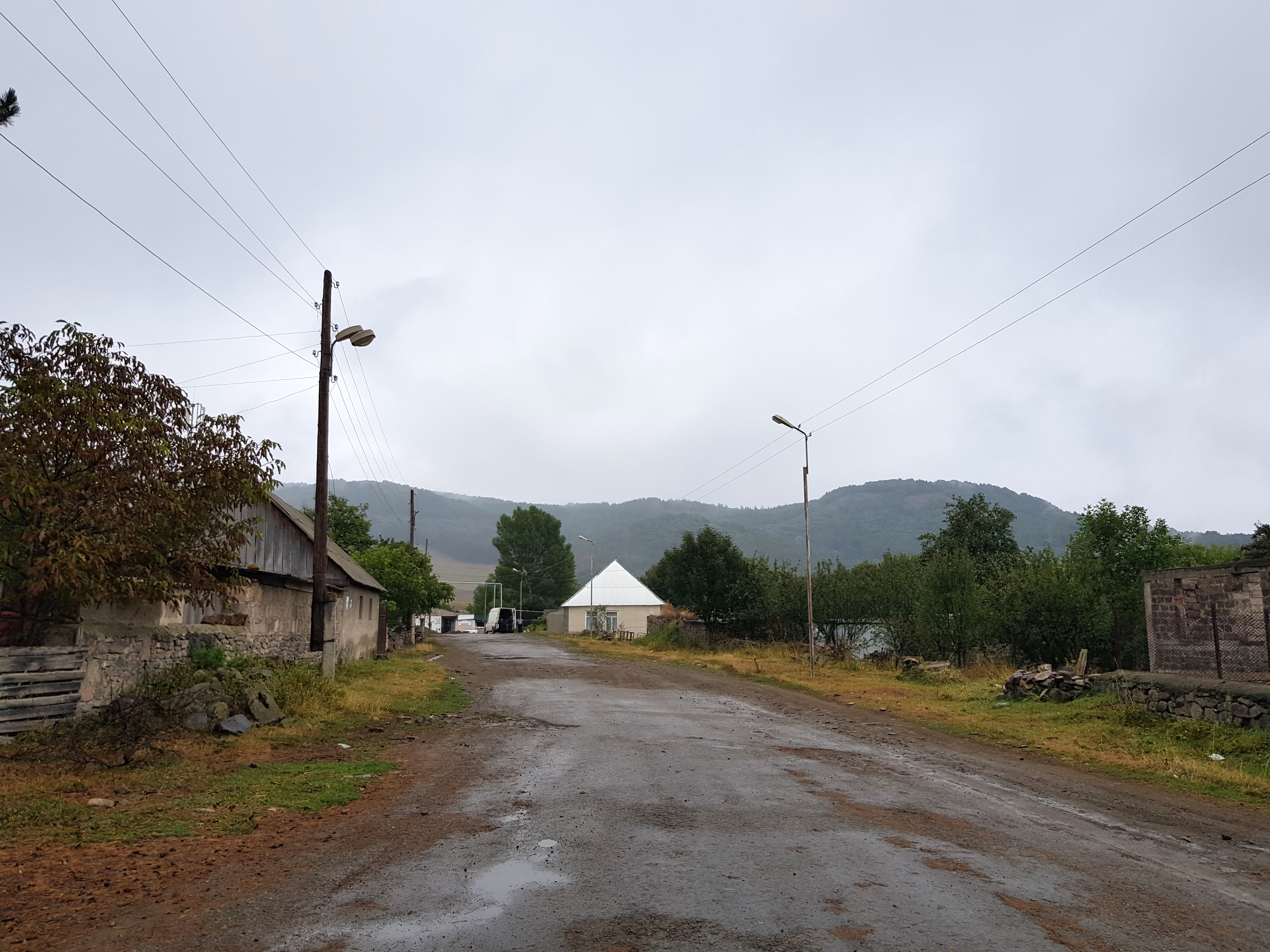

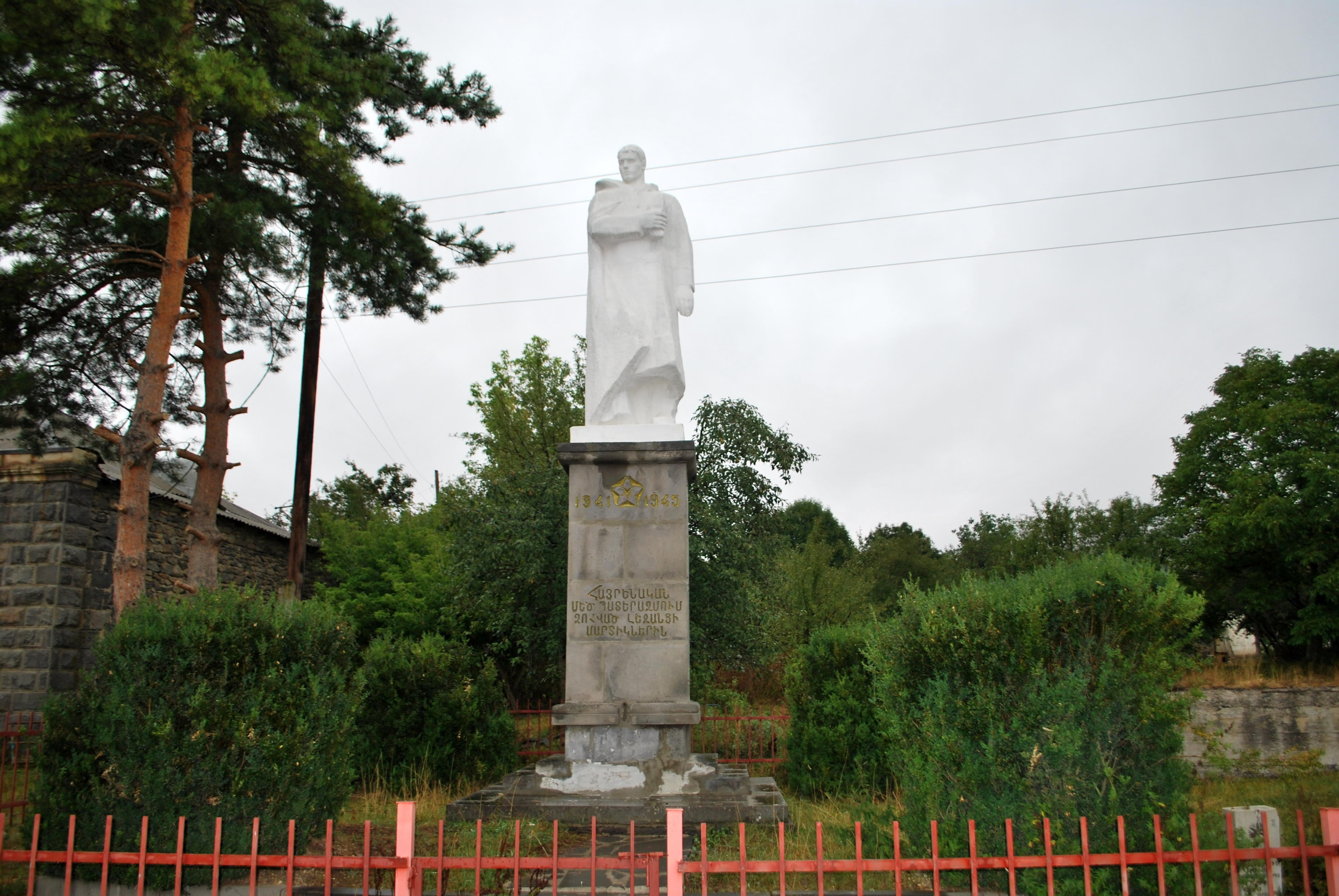

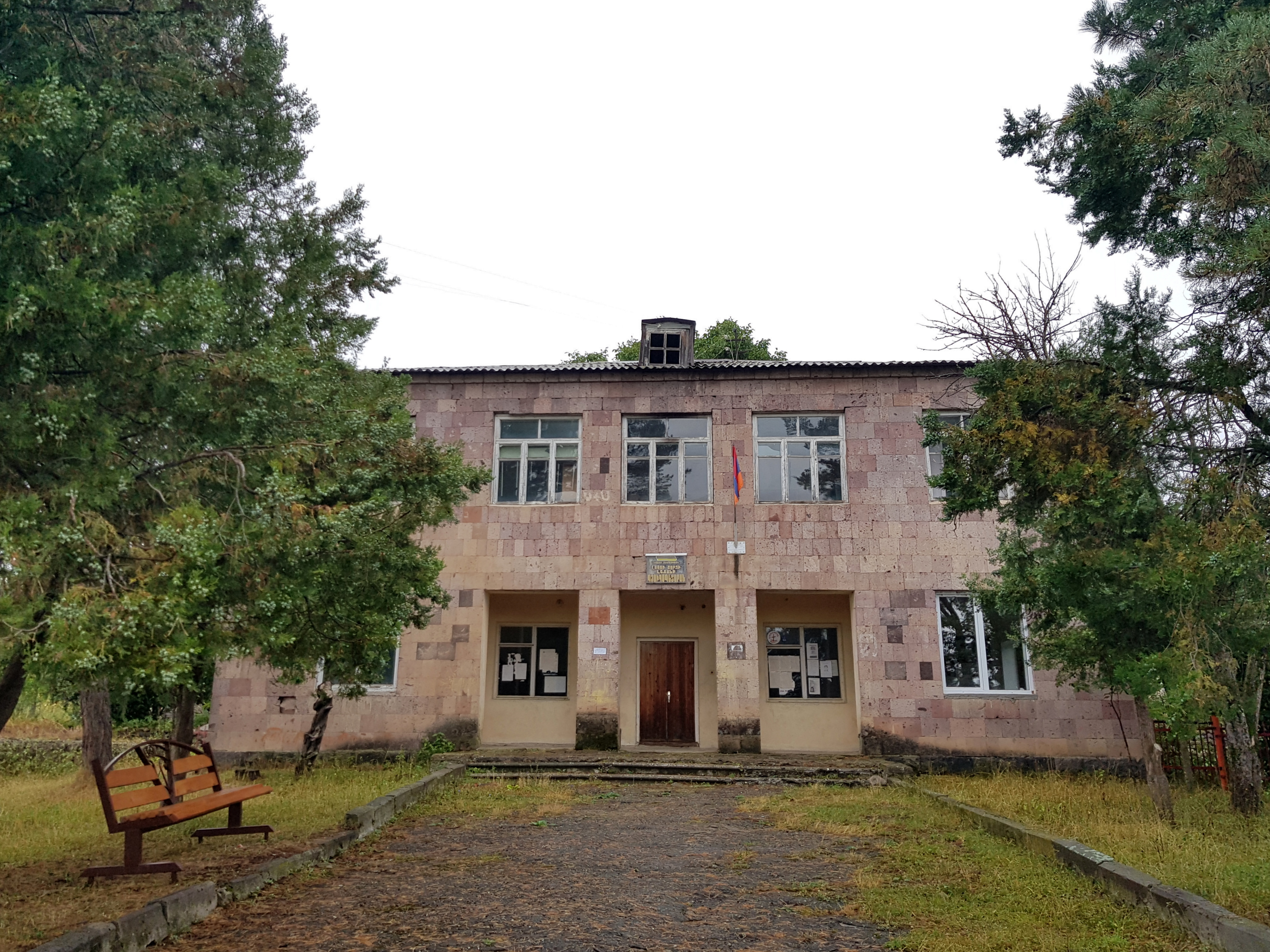

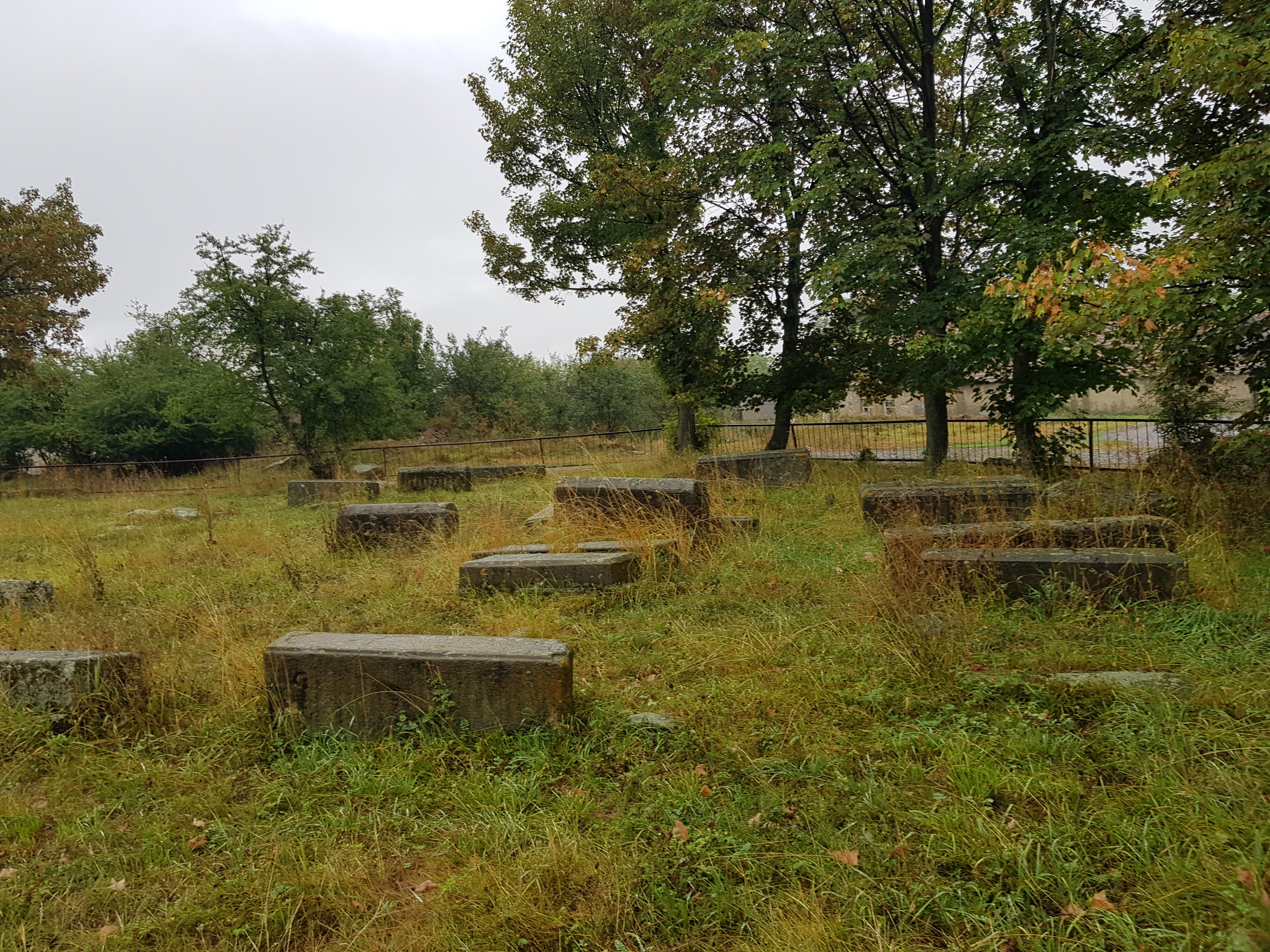
