= Hovtamej =

Village in Armavir, Armenia

Hovtamej Հովտամեջ
- Location within Armenia
- Coordinates: 40°11′01″N 44°15′26″E
- Country: Armenia
- Marz (Province): Armavir

Population (2011)
  - Total: 1,044
- Time zone: UTC+4 ( )
  - Summer (DST): UTC+5 ( )

Hovtamej (Armenian: Հովտամեջ, also Romanized as Ovtamech and Hovtamech; formerly, Mughan and Mughanjik) is a town in the Armavir Province of Armenia. The town's church dates from the 19th century.

== See also ==
- Armavir Province
