= Goghovit =

Goghovit Գոգհովիտ
- Location within Armenia Location within Shirak
- Coordinates: 40°56′N 43°50′E
- Country: Armenia
- Province: Shirak
- Municipality: Ashotsk
- Elevation: 1,840 m (6,040 ft)

Population (2011)
  - Total: 390
- Time zone: UTC+4
  - Summer (DST): UTC+5

Goghovit (Armenian: Գոգհովիտ) is a village in the Ashotsk Municipality of the Shirak Province of Armenia. The town's church dates from 1860. The Statistical Committee of Armenia reported its population was 389 in 2010, down from 396 at the 2001 census.

== Demographics ==
The population of the village since 1831 is as follows:

Historical population
Year	Pop.	±% p.a.
1831	153	—
1922	393	+1.04%
1970	438	+0.23%
1979	359	−2.19%
2001	396	+0.45%
2011	390	−0.15%
