= Ptghunk =

Ptghunk Պտղունք
- Location within Armenia
- Coordinates: 40°09′52″N 44°21′49″E
- Country: Armenia
- Marz (Province): Armavir

Population (2011)
  - Total: 1,795
- Time zone: UTC+4 ( )
  - Summer (DST): UTC+5 ( )

Ptghunk (Armenian: Պտղունք, also Romanized as Ptghunk’, Ptghounq, and Ptkhunk) is a village in the Armenian province of Armavir. The village is about 10 miles from Yerevan on the road to Komitas, and is close to the Zvartnots airport. According to the 2011 census, the population of Ptghunk is 1,795.

== See also ==
- Armavir Province
