= Hayrenyats =

Hayrenyats Հայրենյաց
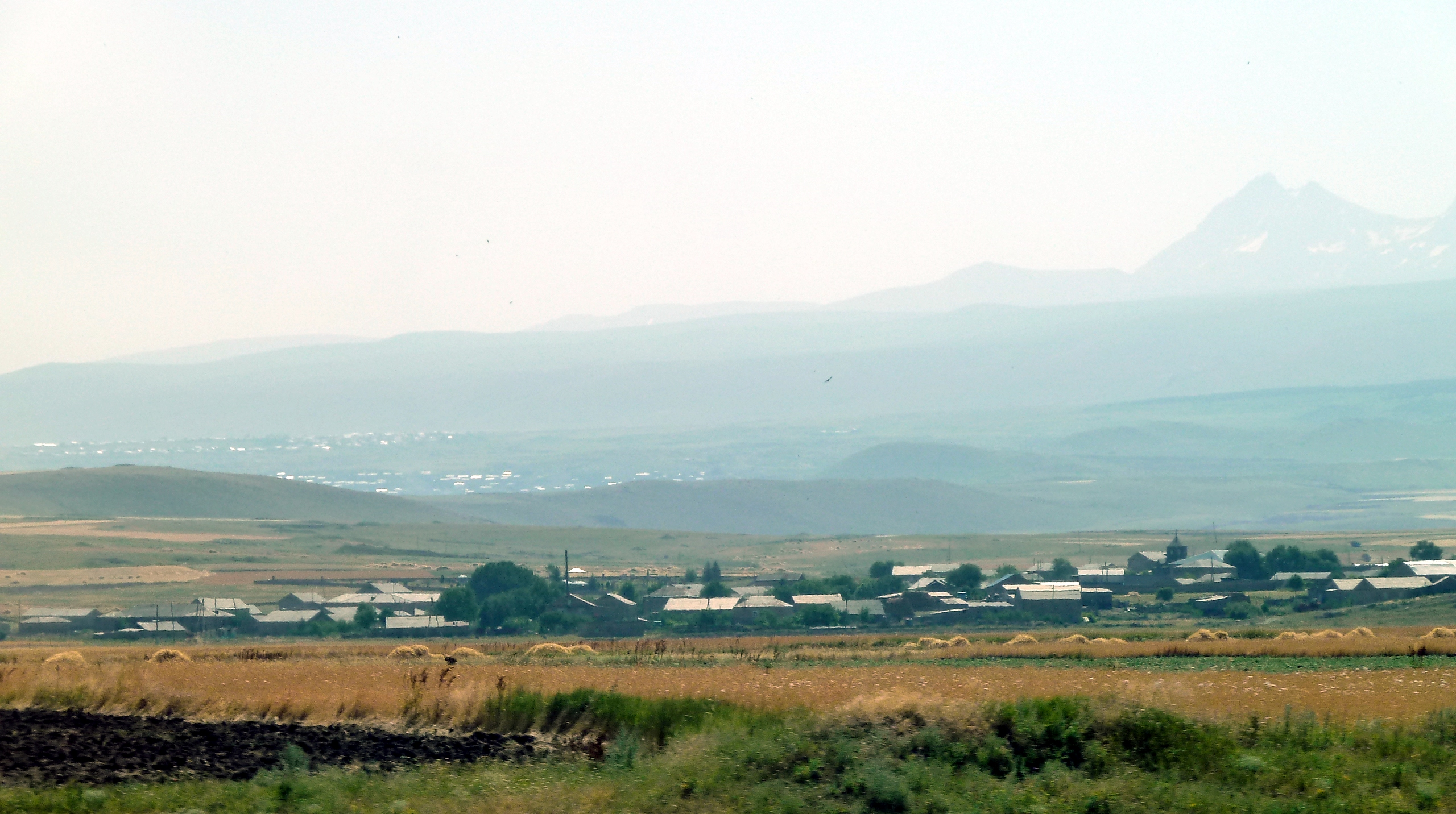
- Hayrenyats

- Location within Armenia Location within Shirak
- Coordinates: 40°37′58″N 43°52′14″E
- Country: Armenia
- Province: Shirak
- Municipality: Artik

Population (2011)
  - Total: 856
- Time zone: UTC+4

Hayrenyats (Armenian: Հայրենյաց) is a village in the Artik Municipality of the Shirak Province of Armenia.

The climate is cold and temperate: with an average annual temperature of 6.3 degrees Celsius and an average annual rainfall of 472mm.

== Demographics ==
The population of the village since 1831 is as follows:

Historical population
Year	Pop.	±% p.a.
1831	88	—
1897	772	+3.35%
1926	745	−0.12%
1939	772	+0.27%
1959	539	−1.78%
1970	582	+0.70%
1979	534	−0.95%
2001	729	+1.42%
2011	856	+1.62%
