= Getk =

Village in Shirak, Armenia

Getk Գետք
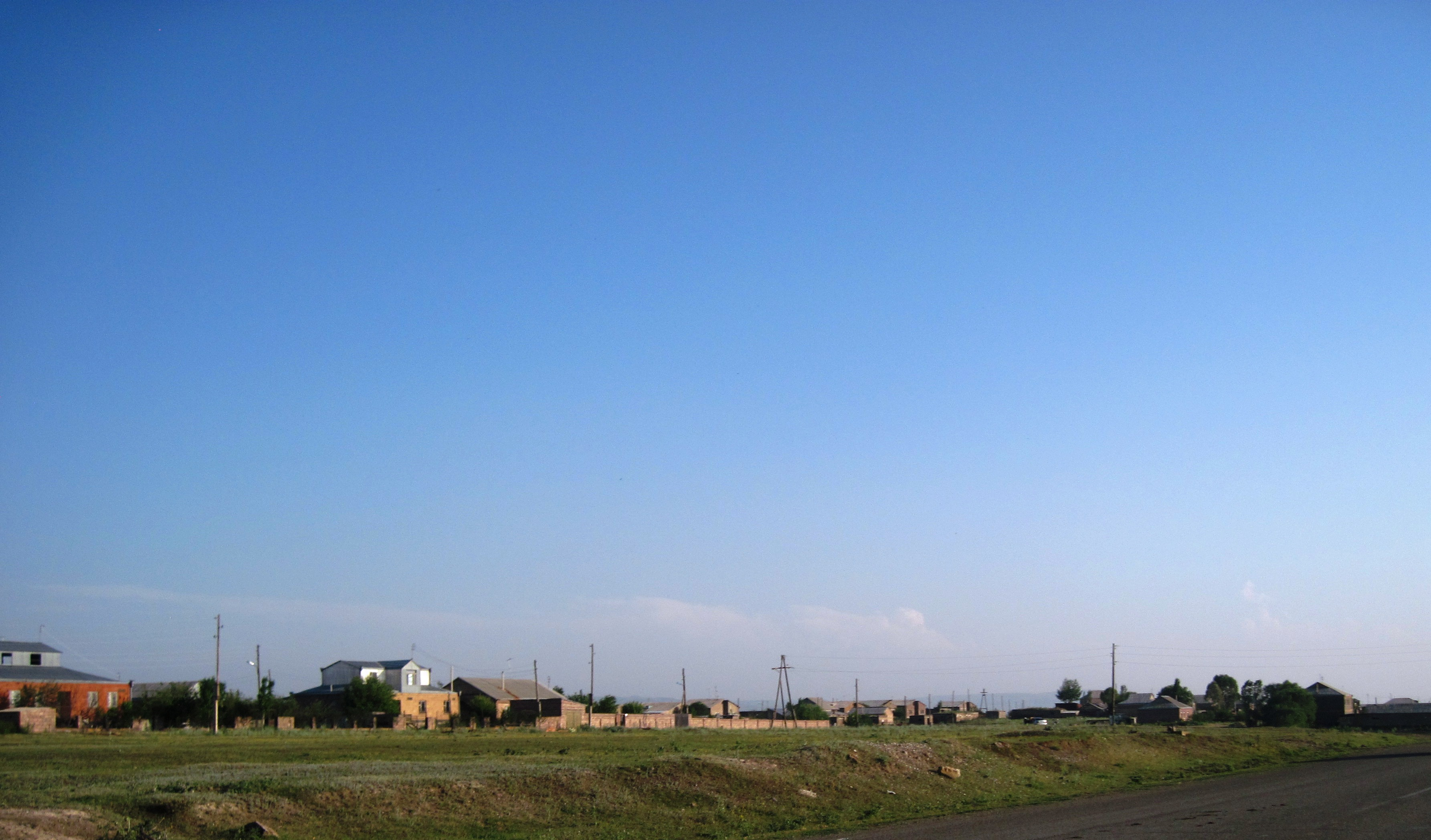

- Location within Armenia Location within Shirak
- Coordinates: 40°44′N 43°47′E
- Country: Armenia
- Province: Shirak
- Municipality: Akhuryan
- Elevation: 1,460 m (4,790 ft)

Population (2011)
  - Total: 545
- Time zone: UTC+4
  - Summer (DST): UTC+5

Getk (Armenian: Գետք) is a village in the Akhuryan Municipality of the Shirak Province of Armenia. Statistical Committee of Armenia reported its population was 601 in 2010, up from 574 at the 2001 census.

== Demographics ==
The population of the village since 1897 is as follows:

Historical population
Year	Pop.	±% p.a.
1897	711	—
1926	475	−1.38%
1939	673	+2.72%
1959	589	−0.66%
1970	477	−1.90%
1979	441	−0.87%
1989	1,204	+10.57%
2001	574	−5.99%
2011	545	−0.52%
