= Pokrashen =

Pokrashen Փոքրաշեն
- Location within Armenia Location within Shirak
- Coordinates: 40°54′N 43°53′E
- Country: Armenia
- Province: Shirak
- Municipality: Akhuryan

Population (2011)
  - Total: 203
- Time zone: UTC+4

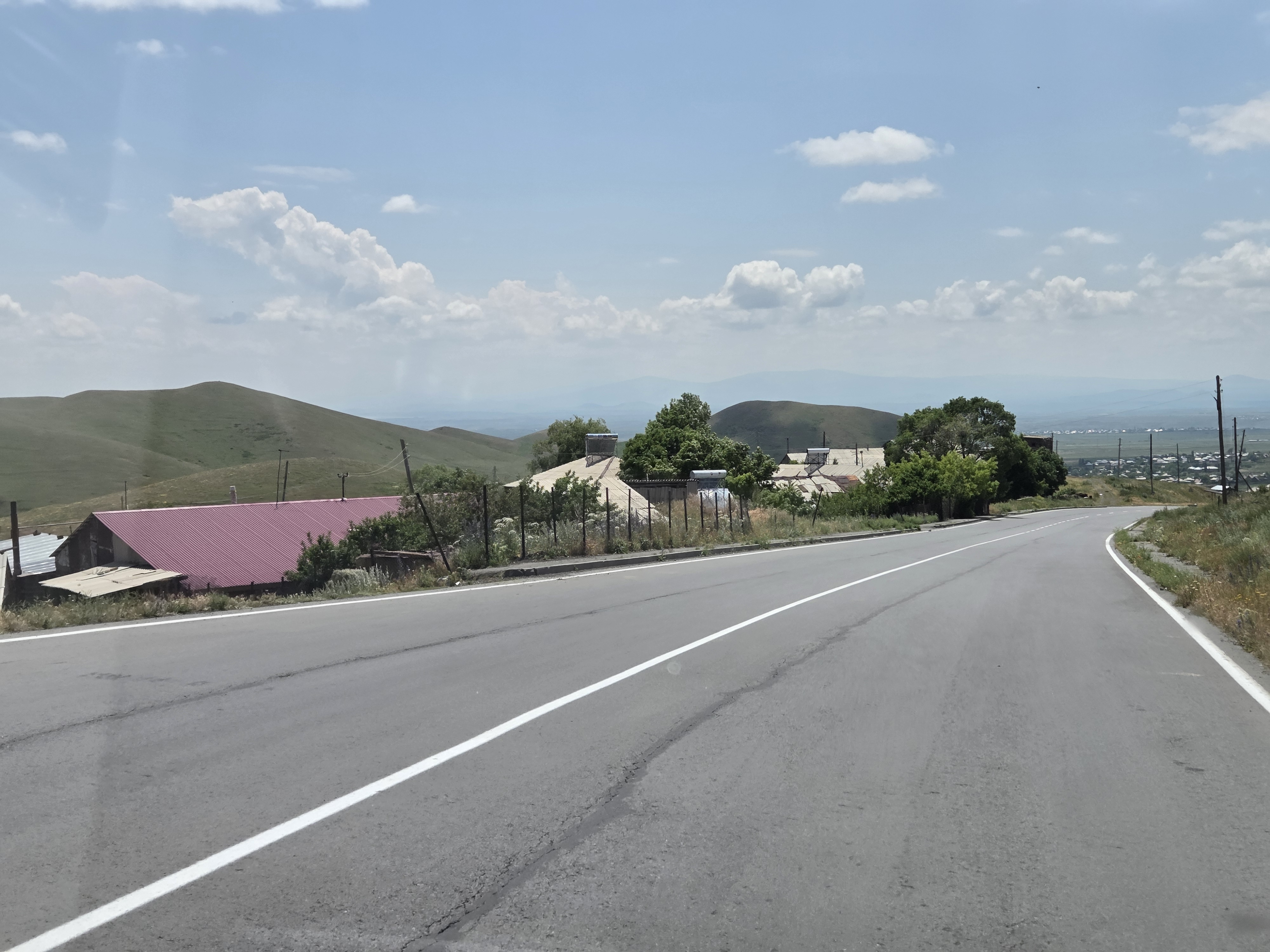

Pokrashen (Armenian: Փոքրաշեն) is a village in Akhuryan Municipality of the Shirak Province, Armenia.

== Demographics ==
Historical population
Year	Pop.	±% p.a.
1831	121	—
1897	388	+1.78%
1926	218	−1.97%
1939	369	+4.13%
1959	309	−0.88%
1970	196	−4.05%
1979	212	+0.88%
1989	193	−0.93%
2001	205	+0.50%
2011	203	−0.10%
