= Aygabats =

Village in Shirak, Armenia

Aygabats Այգաբաց
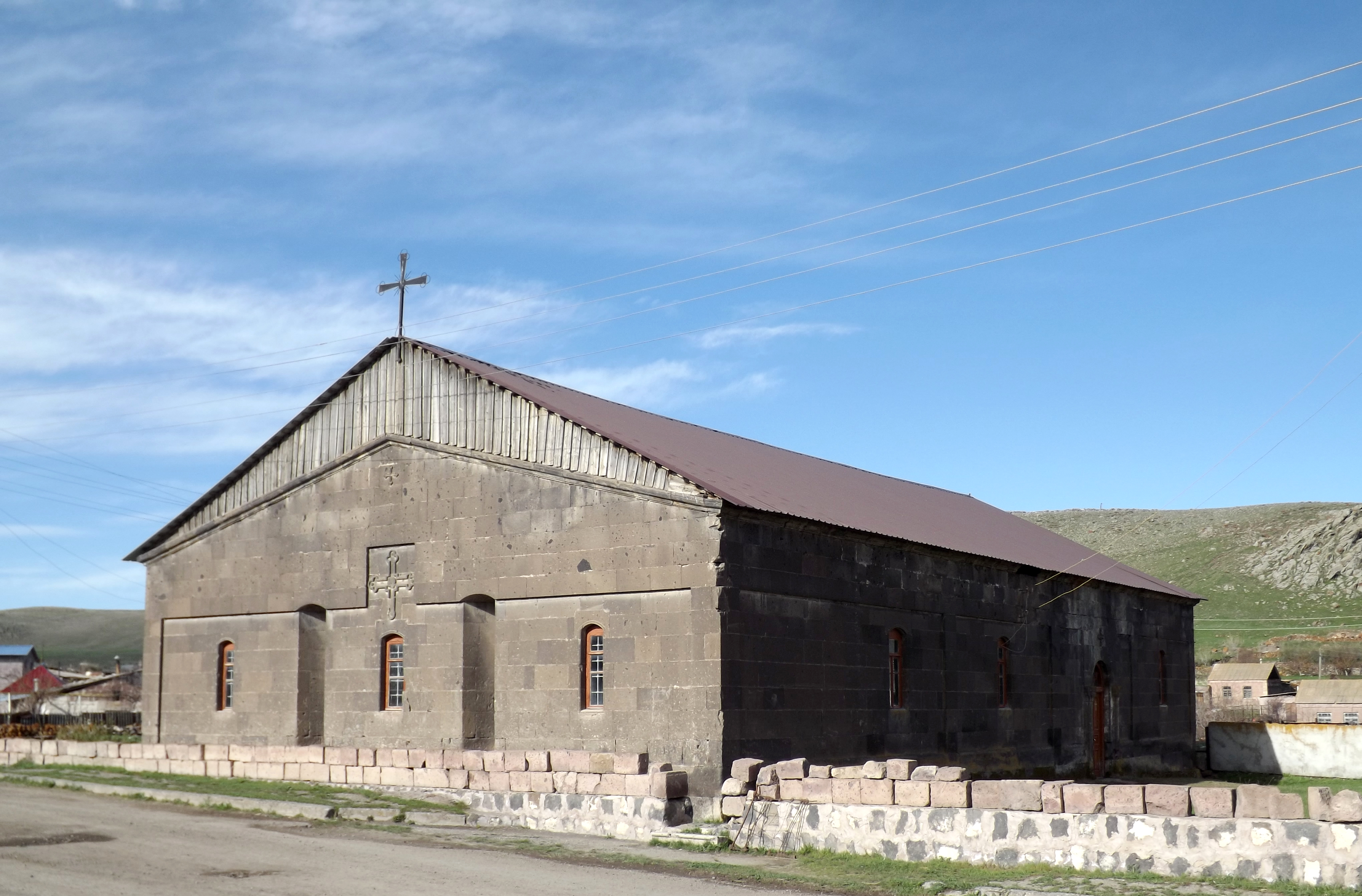
- Church in Aygabats

- Location within Armenia Location within Shirak
- Coordinates: 40°42′N 43°54′E
- Country: Armenia
- Province: Shirak
- Municipality: Akhuryan
- Elevation: 1,600 m (5,200 ft)

Population (2011)
  - Total: 701
- Time zone: UTC+4
  - Summer (DST): UTC+5

Aygabats (Armenian: Այգաբաց) is a village in the Akhuryan Municipality of the Shirak Province of Armenia. The Statistical Committee of Armenia reported its population was 766 in 2010, up from 757 at the 2001 census.

== Demographics ==
Historical population
Year	Pop.	±% p.a.
1831	434	—
1873	900	+1.75%
1914	2,050	+2.03%
1919	2,170	+1.14%
1959	1,089	−1.71%
1979	617	−2.80%
1989	691	+1.14%
2001	757	+0.76%
2004	722	−1.57%
2011	701	−0.42%
