= Nor Kyank, Shirak =

Nor Kyank Նոր Կյանք
- Location within Armenia Location within Shirak
- Coordinates: 40°39′01″N 43°58′30″E
- Country: Armenia
- Province: Shirak
- Municipality: Artik

Population (2011)
  - Total: 1,701
- Time zone: UTC+4
  - Summer (DST): UTC+5

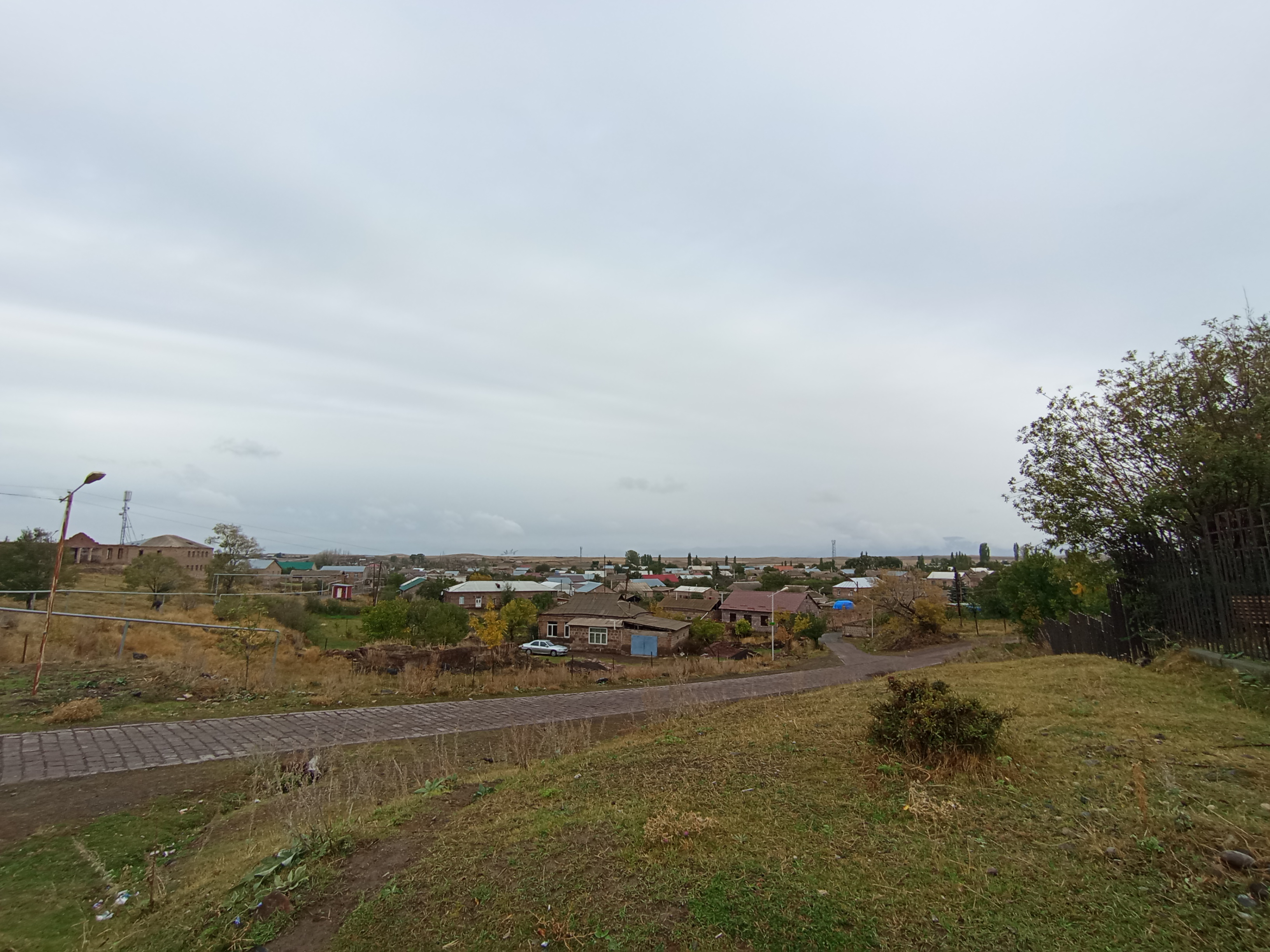
New Life village of Artik region

Nor Kyank (Armenian: Նոր Կյանք) is a village in the Artik Municipality of the Shirak Province of Armenia.

== Demographics ==
Historical population
Year	Pop.	±% p.a.
1831	271	—
1897	1,131	+2.19%
1926	1,136	+0.02%
1939	1,174	+0.25%
1959	1,138	−0.16%
1970	1,370	+1.70%
1979	1,246	−1.05%
1989	1,690	+3.09%
2001	1,464	−1.19%
2011	1,701	+1.51%
