= Zuygaghbyur =

Village in Shirak, Armenia

Zuygaghbyur Զույգաղբյուր
- Location within Armenia Location within Shirak
- Coordinates: 41°01′16″N 43°54′13″E
- Country: Armenia
- Province: Shirak
- Municipality: Ashotsk

Population (2011)
  - Total: 411
- Time zone: UTC+4
  - Summer (DST): UTC+5

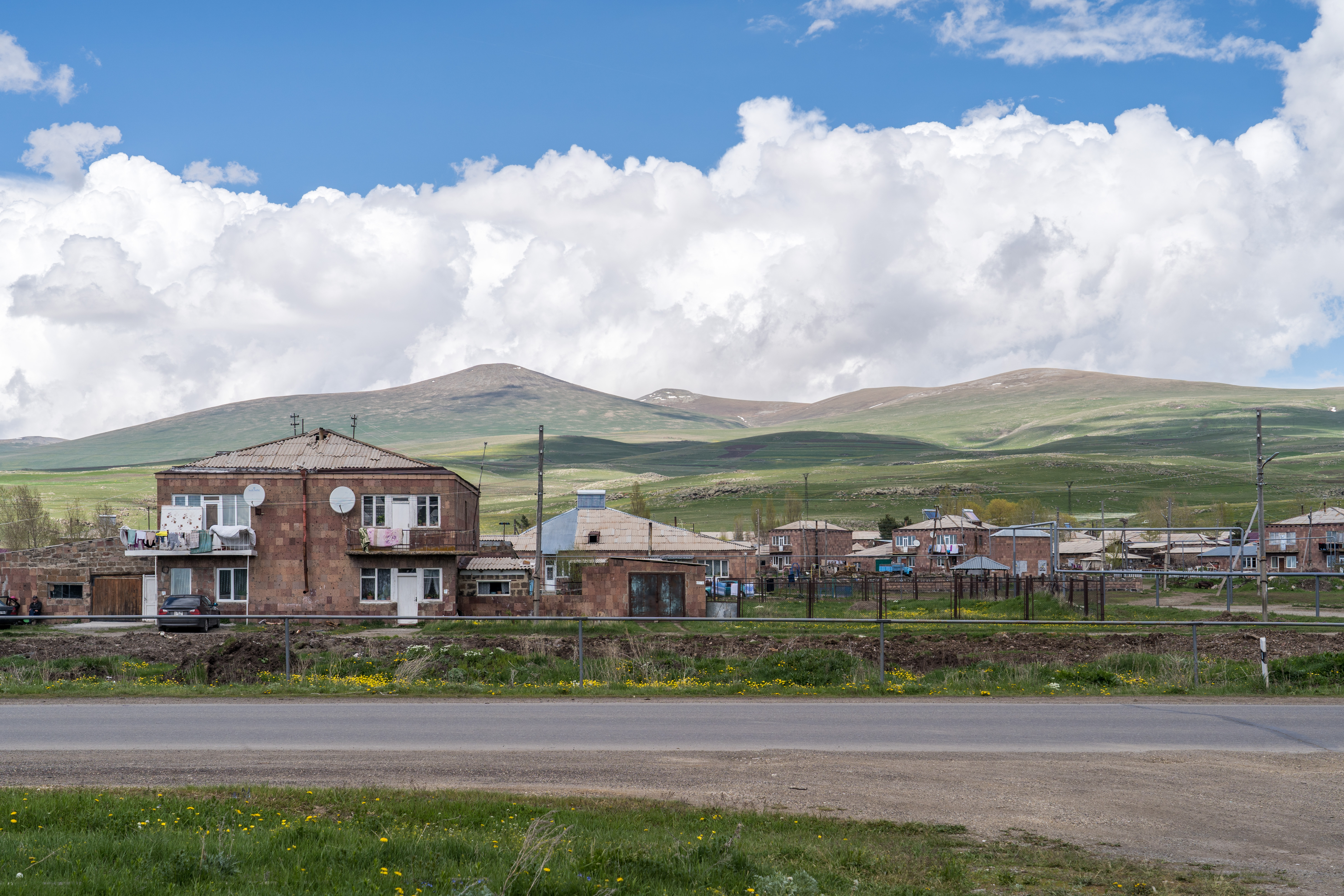
Zuygaghbyur

Zuygaghbyur (Armenian: Զույգաղբյուր) is a village in the Ashotsk Municipality of the Shirak Province of Armenia.

== Demographics ==
The population of the village since 1873 is as follows:

Historical population
Year	Pop.	±% p.a.
1873	311	—
1897	549	+2.40%
1926	499	−0.33%
1939	709	+2.74%
1959	500	−1.73%
1970	365	−2.82%
1979	330	−1.11%
2001	417	+1.07%
2011	411	−0.14%

|1979 |330 |- |2001 |417 |- |2004 |419 |}
