= Kaghsi =

Kaghsi Քաղսի
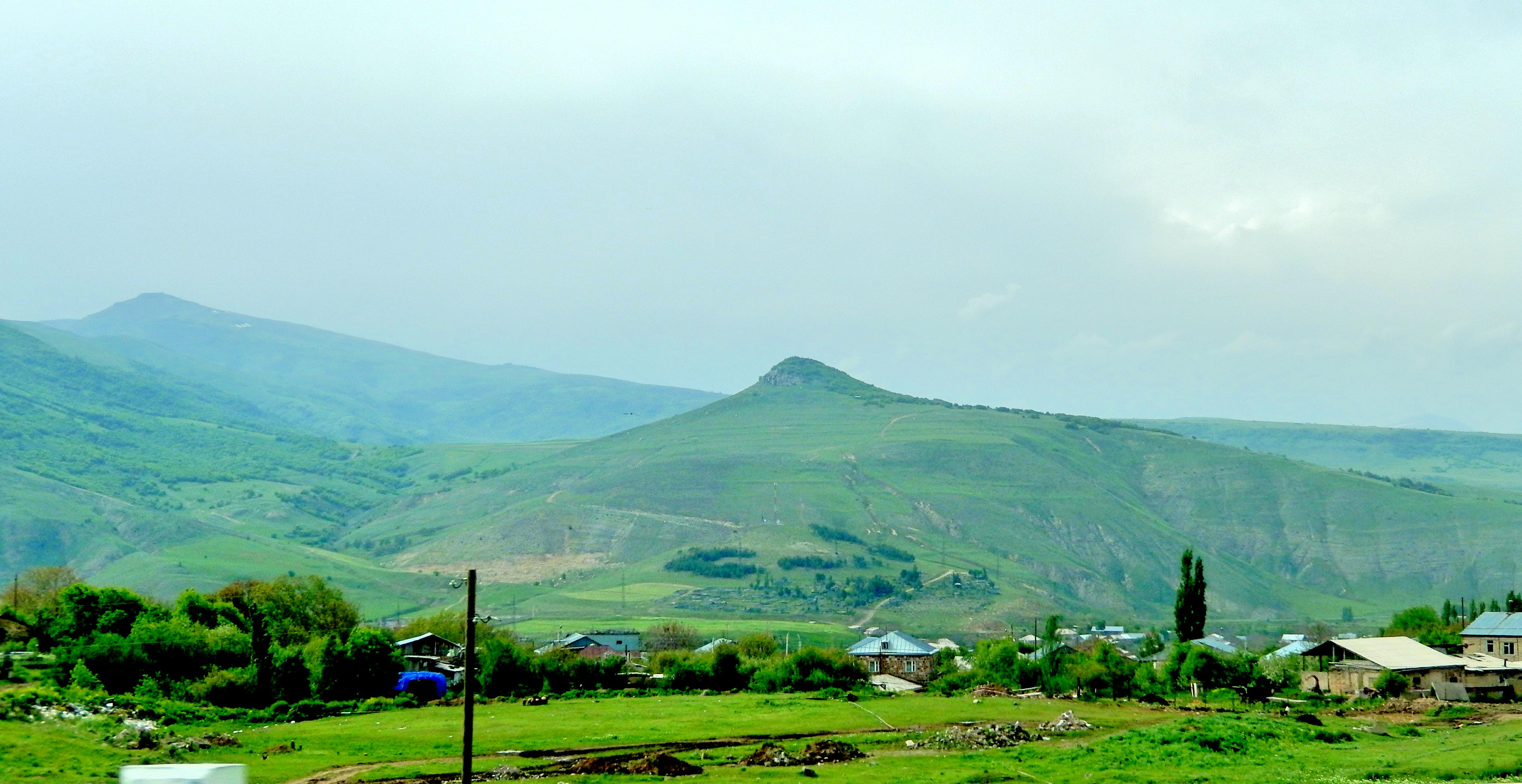
- Kaghsi

- Location within Armenia
- Coordinates: 40°28′50″N 44°44′28″E
- Country: Armenia
- Province: Kotayk

Population (2011)
  - Total: 2,200
- Time zone: UTC+4 ( )

Kaghsi (Armenian: Քաղսի) is a village in the Kotayk Province of Armenia.

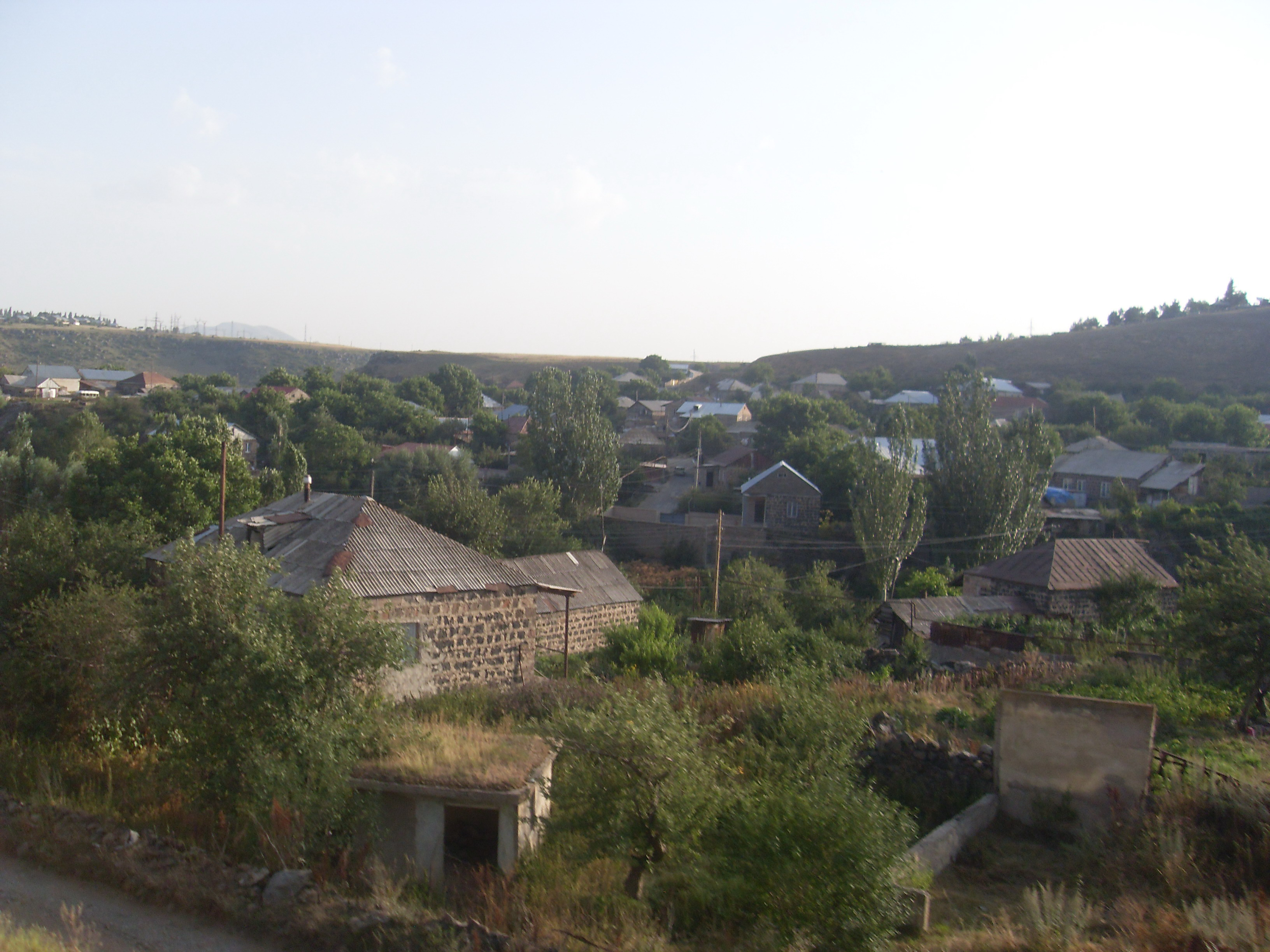

== See also ==
- Kotayk Province
