= Amasia, Shirak =

Amasia Ամասիա
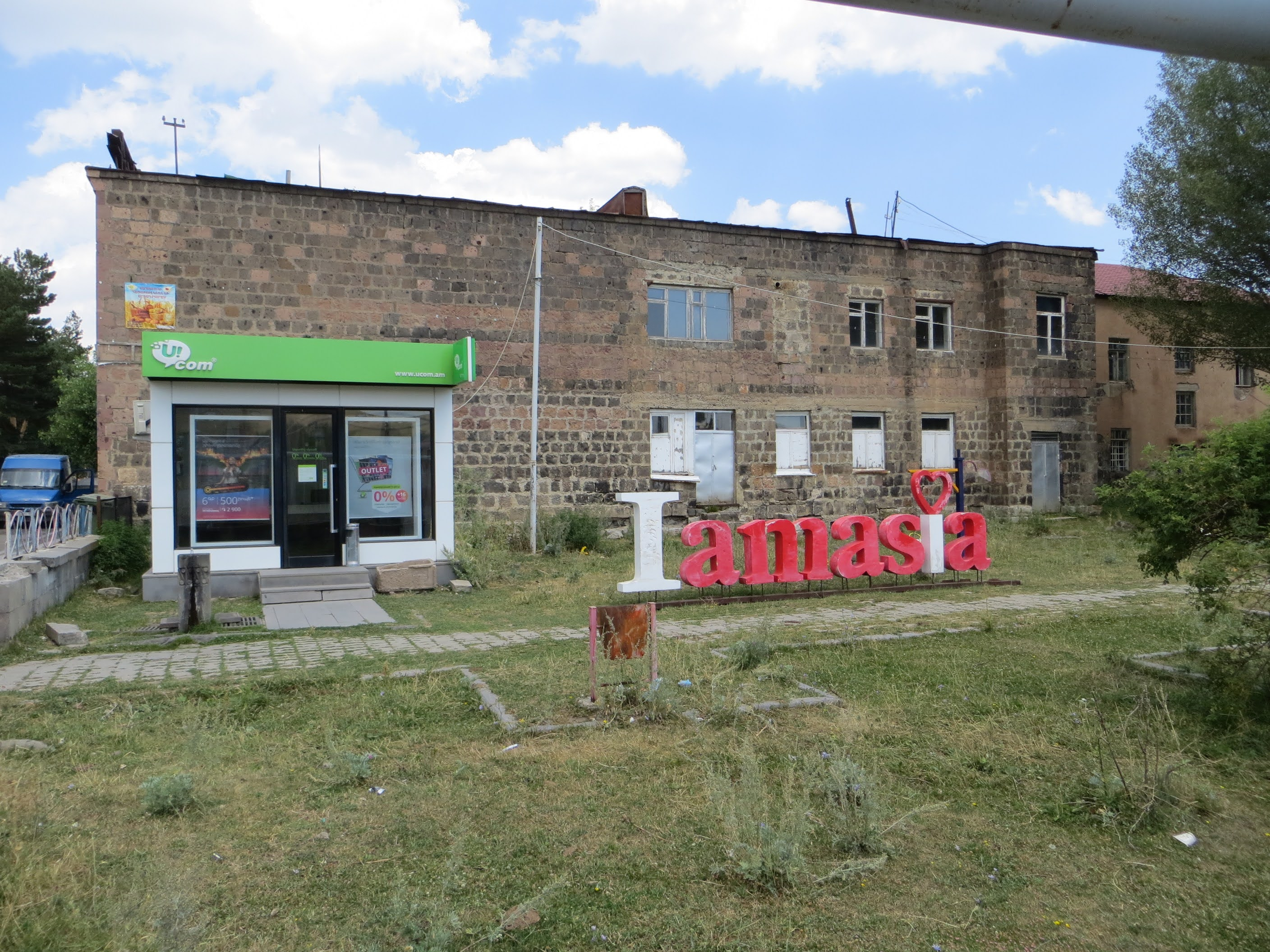

- Location within Armenia Location within Shirak
- Coordinates: 40°56′48″N 43°46′53″E
- Country: Armenia
- Province: Shirak
- Municipality: Amasia
- Elevation: 1,870 m (6,140 ft)

Population (2011)
  - Total: 1,532
- Time zone: UTC+4

Amasia (Armenian: Ամասիա), previously known as Hamasia, is a village in the Amasia Municipality of the Shirak Province of Armenia. It is located on the right bank of the Akhuryan River.

== Name ==
Amasia's name is traditionally connected with the name of Amasia Haykazuni, a great-grandson of Hayk, the legendary progenitor of the Armenians.

== History ==
Historically, the area that Amasia is located in was a part of the canton of Ashotsk of the province of Gugark of the ancient Kingdom of Armenia. Approximately two kilometers to the northwest of the village is a ruined ancient fortress built in Cyclopean style that the villagers refer to as Chatin Dara, dated to approximately the 3–2 millennia BCE. Two kilometers to the west of the village is an abandoned settlement that the villagers call Kharabalar (from Turkish Harabeler, or "Ruins") which according to folk tradition was inhabited by Greeks. There are also a number of medieval Armenian churches in the area around the village. Most of the current inhabitants of Amasia and the nearby villages are descended from Armenians who came from Basen and Kars and other parts of Western Armenia starting from 1829, when Eastern Armenia was conquered by the Russian Empire. Until the 1920s the core village of Amasia was populated almost entirely by Turkic-speaking Sunni Muslims (Qarapapaqs). According to the 1912 edition of the Caucasian Calendar reference book, 528 people, mainly Qarapapaqs, lived in Amasia, then located in the Kars Okrug of the Kars Oblast of the Russian Empire. By 1931, Armenians outnumbered the Turkic population, and eventually the village became exclusively Armenian-populated.

In 1893, the British explorer and author of a two volume work on Armenia, H. F. B. Lynch, visited the village. During Soviet times, Amasia was the capital of the Amasia District of Soviet Armenia. From 1951–1956 the village was officially known as Ghukasyan (or Ghukasyan Nerkin to distinguish it from Ashotsk, then also called Ghukasyan), after the Armenian Young Communist Ghukas Ghukasyan who died during the May Uprising.

== Government ==
Amasia is the center of the municipality (enlarged rural community) of Amasia, which, as of 2023, encompasses 25 other villages: Aregnadem, Bandivan, Byurakn, Gtashen, Kamkhut, Hovtun, Voghji, Hoghmik, Meghrashat, Jradzor, Alvar, Aghvorik, Ardenis, Garnarij, Lorasar, Darik, Yeghnajur, Aravet, Zarishat, Tsaghkut, Shaghik, Zorakert, Berdashen, Yerizak, and Paghakn.

== Climate ==
Climate data for Amasia, Shirak (1991–2020, extremes 1981-2020)
Month	Jan	Feb	Mar	Apr	May	Jun	Jul	Aug	Sep	Oct	Nov	Dec	Year
Record high °C (°F)	6.3 (43.3)	10.5 (50.9)	16.9 (62.4)	22.6 (72.7)	24.9 (76.8)	29.5 (85.1)	33.3 (91.9)	34.6 (94.3)	31.5 (88.7)	24.0 (75.2)	16.7 (62.1)	12.9 (55.2)	34.6 (94.3)
Mean daily maximum °C (°F)	1.8 (35.2)	3.7 (38.7)	9.3 (48.7)	17.2 (63.0)	21.4 (70.5)	25.7 (78.3)	29.4 (84.9)	29.7 (85.5)	26.5 (79.7)	20.2 (68.4)	12.6 (54.7)	4.8 (40.6)	16.9 (62.4)
Daily mean °C (°F)	−8.0 (17.6)	−6.8 (19.8)	−1.8 (28.8)	4.5 (40.1)	9.4 (48.9)	13.8 (56.8)	16.9 (62.4)	17.4 (63.3)	13.2 (55.8)	7.6 (45.7)	0.6 (33.1)	−5.4 (22.3)	5.1 (41.2)
Mean daily minimum °C (°F)	−20.6 (−5.1)	−20.1 (−4.2)	−15.4 (4.3)	−7.7 (18.1)	−0.6 (30.9)	3.4 (38.1)	6.8 (44.2)	7.0 (44.6)	1.4 (34.5)	−3.7 (25.3)	−10.8 (12.6)	−17.5 (0.5)	−6.5 (20.3)
Record low °C (°F)	−26.2 (−15.2)	−28.4 (−19.1)	−25.9 (−14.6)	−15.5 (4.1)	−6.0 (21.2)	−2.3 (27.9)	1.9 (35.4)	2.6 (36.7)	−5.4 (22.3)	−7.7 (18.1)	−21.4 (−6.5)	−24.7 (−12.5)	−28.4 (−19.1)
Average precipitation mm (inches)	40.0 (1.57)	34.2 (1.35)	45.5 (1.79)	76.4 (3.01)	110.5 (4.35)	86.7 (3.41)	53.1 (2.09)	46.3 (1.82)	32.2 (1.27)	49.0 (1.93)	32.5 (1.28)	41.0 (1.61)	647.4 (25.48)
Average precipitation days (≥ 1.0 mm)	7.5	6.7	8.6	11.8	15.8	11.3	8.8	7.8	6	7.5	6.3	7.2	105.3
Average relative humidity (%)	84.8	83.5	81.6	78.9	80.2	77.7	76.6	74.5	75.2	79.9	83.2	86.2	80.2
Mean monthly sunshine hours	89.9	113.0	158.1	171.0	223.2	306.0	347.2	328.6	276.0	195.3	150.0	93.0	2,451.3
Mean daily sunshine hours	2.9	4.0	5.1	5.7	7.2	10.2	11.2	10.6	9.2	6.3	5.0	3.0	6.7
Source 1: NOAA
Source 2: DWD(sun 2005-2019)

== Population ==
The population of the village since 1886 is as follows:

Historical population
Year	Pop.	±% p.a.
1886	274	—
1908	507	+2.84%
1914	564	+1.79%
1931	645	+0.79%
1939	1,031	+6.04%
1959	1,527	+1.98%
1970	2,773	+5.57%
1980	3,175	+1.36%
2001	1,878	−2.47%
2011	1,532	−2.02%

In 1908, the majority of the population of the town was mainly Karapapakhs and in 1931, the population included 568 Armenians, 424 Karapapakh, 33 Russians and 6 others.
