= Gtashen =

Village in Shirak, Armenia

Gtashen Գտաշեն
- Location within Armenia Location within Shirak
- Coordinates: 40°55′08″N 43°43′01″E
- Country: Armenia
- Province: Shirak
- Municipality: Amasia
- Elevation: 1,860 m (6,100 ft)

Population (2011)
  - Total: 271
- Time zone: UTC+4

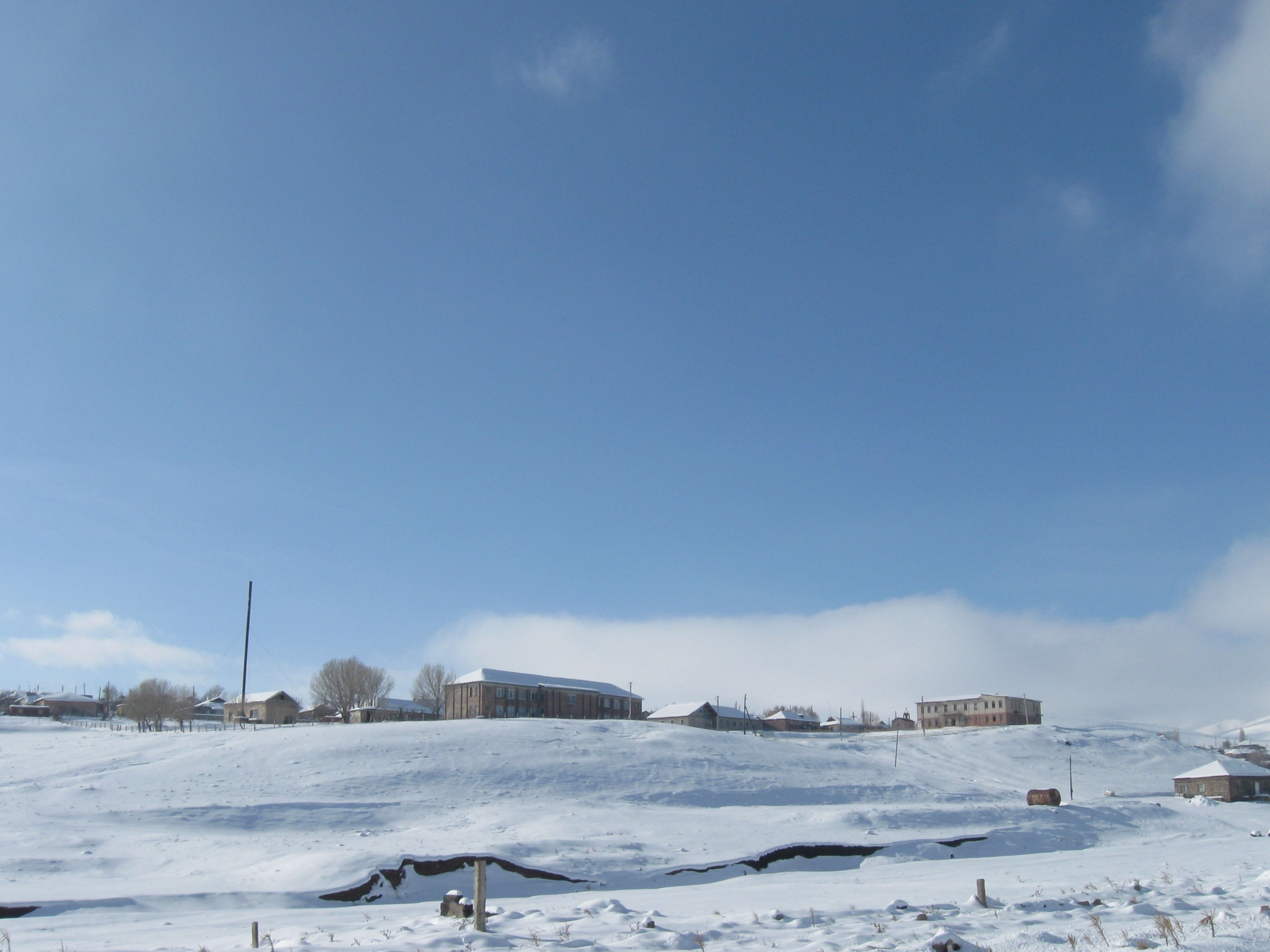
An image of Gtashen

Gtashen (Armenian: Գտաշեն) is a village in the Amasia Municipality of the Shirak Province of Armenia.

== History ==
Armenians and Azeris once lived in the village, as well as Greeks, who even had a church, of which a half-ruined wall remains in the center of the village. In 1988-1989 Armenians from Akhalkalaki, Gyumri, Talin, Amasia and Nagorno-Karabakh settled in the village.

== Demographics ==
According to 1912 publication of Kavkazskiy kalendar, 495 people, mainly Karapapakhs lived in village Magaradjik of Kars Okrug of Kars Oblast.

The community of Gtashen consists of the villages of Gtashen and Kamkhut. The Statistical Committee of Armenia reported that the community's population was 258 in 2010, down from 378 at the 2001 census.

The population of the village since 1886 is as follows:

Historical population
Year	Pop.	±% p.a.
1886	309	—
1908	480	+2.02%
1922	312	−3.03%
1959	557	+1.58%
1970	983	+5.30%
1979	925	−0.67%
1989	139	−17.27%
2001	378	+8.69%
2011	356	−0.60%
