= Amasiya, Armenia =

Amasiya, Armenia may refer to:

- Amasiya, Armavir
- Amasiya, Shirak

== See also ==
- Amasia (disambiguation)
