= Muslim uprisings in Kars and Sharur–Nakhichevan =

1919–20 rebellions in Armenia

- Part of the Armenian–Azerbaijani war and the Eastern Front of the Turkish War of Independence
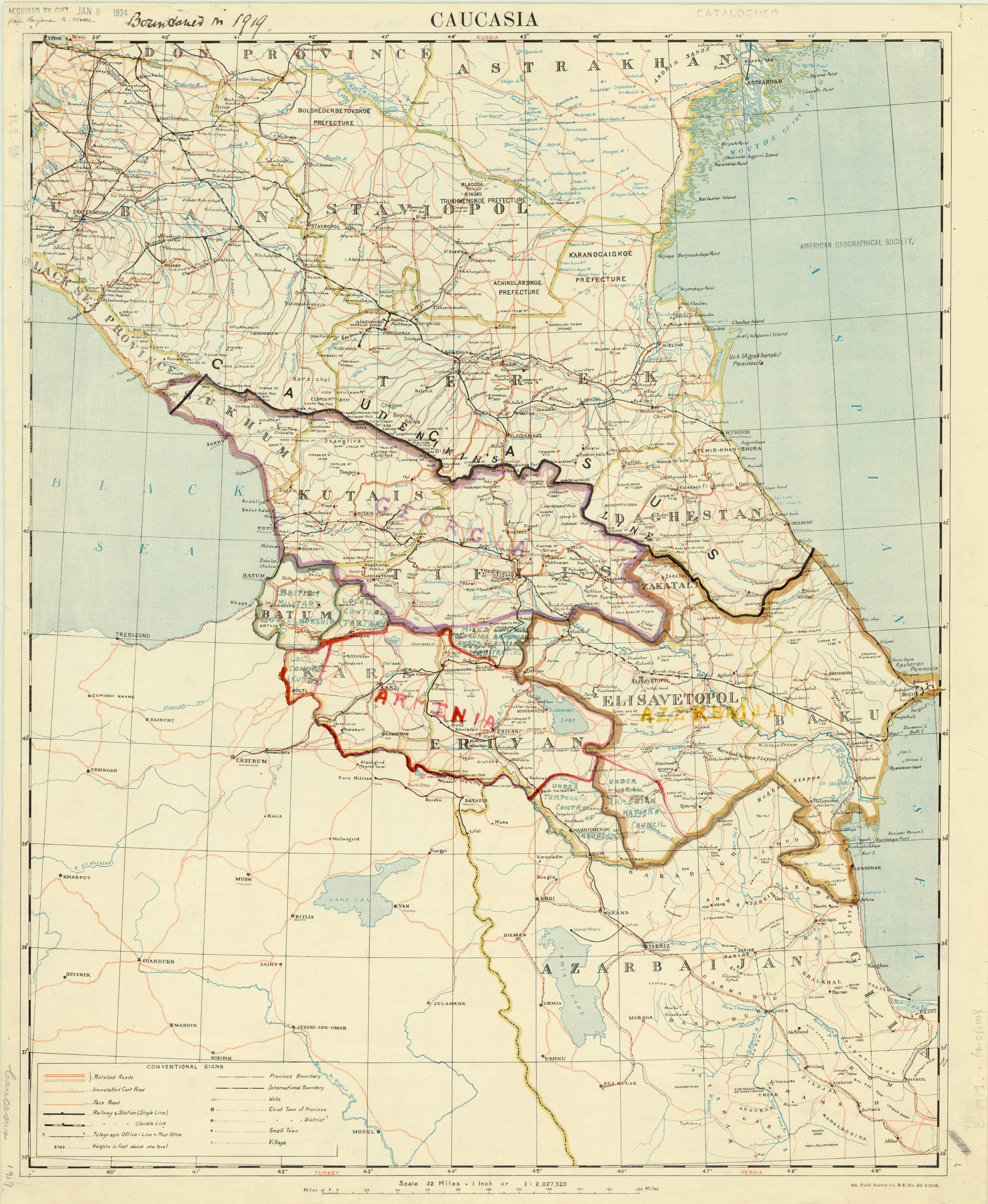
- A 1918 political map of the Caucasus by the British Army showing the de facto states of Armenia, Azerbaijan, Georgia, as well as the regions "under temporary control of insurgents".
Date	1 July 1919 – 28 July 1920 (1 year, 3 weeks and 6 days)
Location	First Republic of Armenia; Violence primarily focused in Ararat, Ardahan, Iğdır, Kars, and Nakhchivan
Result	Armenian victory

Belligerents
(Armenia) Armenian army: Armenian Revolutionary Federation; Armed Forces of South Russia (arms shipments)	Muslims: Azerbaijanis; Turks; Kurds; Azerbaijan (arms shipments, instructors, officers); (Turkey) Turkish revolutionaries (arms shipments, instructors, officers)

Commanders and leaders
(Armenia) Drastamat Kanayan; (Armenia) Hovhannes Hakhverdyan; (Armenia) Sebouh Nersesian; (Armenia) Hovhannes Mazmanyan; (Armenia) Colonel Shaghrutyan; (United Kingdom) K. M. Davie	Halil Sami Bey; Jafargulu Khan Nakhchivanski; (Kurdistan Region) Shamil bey Airumlinsky; (Kurdistan Region) Omar Agha; (Kurdistan Region) Hasan Bey

Strength
(First Republic of Armenia) 18,000	In Sharur–Nakhichevan: 6,000–10,000 In Vedibasar: 1,500

Casualties and losses
In Sharur–Nakhichevan: 6,000–12,000 Armenian civilians In Vedibasar: 4,000 Armenian soldiers	Unknown

The Muslim uprisings in Kars and Sharur–Nakhichevan were a series of insurgencies by local Muslims against the administration of the First Republic of Armenia, beginning on 1 July 1919 and ending 28 July 1920. The areas of uprising were persuaded into insurrection by the sedition of Turkish and Azerbaijani agents who were trying to destabilise Armenia in order to form a pan-Turkic corridor between their nations.

Following the withdrawal of the Ottoman army from the South Caucasus, local Muslims in the formerly occupied areas (Note: In the internationally unrecognized Treaty of Batum, the Ottoman Empire occupied southwestern parts of the Russian Caucasus containing 197,000 Muslims.) were armed and assisted in establishing political states with the aim of resisting reincorporation into Armenia. In the spring of 1919, the British command in the Caucasus assisted Armenia in defeating these statelets; however, some months later due to the efforts of Turkish and Azerbaijani emissaries, Armenian administration collapsed and the region fell under local control again until the Armenian counteroffensive in the summer of 1920. The Armenian campaign to reabsorb the Nakhichevan region was halted by the forces of Soviet Russia who had invaded Azerbaijan earlier in the year. The Kars region was briefly reincorporated into Armenian governance until it was conquered by Turkish forces by the end of the Turkish–Armenian war in December 1920.

Investigations conducted by American relief workers confirmed the reports of large-scale massacres of the local Armenians in the Sharur–Nakhichevan region. Armenia was assisted only by the forces of Anton Denikin who dispatched ammunition to replenish the enervated Armenian army.

== Background ==
On 4 June 1918, in the aftermath of the October Revolution and the collapse of Russian authority in the South Caucasus, the newly independent First Republic of Armenia was forced to relinquish extensive territories to the Ottoman Empire through the Treaty of Batum. The districts surrendered consisted of Kars and western parts of the Erivan Governorate including most of the counties (Russian: уезды, romanized: uezdy) of Surmalu and Nakhichevan (present-day Iğdır Province and Nakhchivan, respectively).

Following the Armistice of Mudros, the Ottoman army was forced to withdraw from the formerly-Russian territories it had seized. The withdrawal which occurred throughout 1918–1919 left Muslim puppet states in the wake of the retreat to hinder the westward expansion of the fledgling Armenian and Georgian republics.

The Provisional National Government of the Southwestern Caucasus and the Republic of Aras existed for some months until their capitulation by Armenian and British forces in April 1919. Despite the apparent defeat of the Ottoman Empire, Turkish agitators, invigorated by the British withdrawal from the South Caucasus, were reportedly encouraging sedition amongst Muslim villagers in Armenia—the subversive activities culminating in a series of anti-Armenian uprisings in the summer of 1919.

A contemporary source writes: "By the summer of 1919, the question of repatriation was completely overshadowed by widespread Muslim uprisings. The issues at stake had transformed the repatriation question into a matter of Armenian survival." In 1921, C. E. Bechhofer Roberts wrote: "[On] the Igdir front ... General Sebo was holding the Kurds at bay ... [T]owards Ararat ... was the Kamarloo front. There the enemy was the Tartar, supported, of course, by Turkish auxiliaries and excited by their agents. Far away in the East is the way to Nahichevan, which was in the possession of the enemy."

Vahakn Dadrian, professor of sociology, describes Turkey’s collusion with Azeris as a deceitful "Ittihadist pattern of genocide," citing statements from Turkish General Karabakeir who wrote "under the pretext of protecting the rights of Muslim minorities, there is ground for constant intervention" and "arming the Turks of the area little by little, toward the goal of linking up east and west in the area, and molding Azerbaijan into an independent Turkish government through the creation of a national force structure."

== Azerbaijani uprisings ==
=== Zangibasar ===
Named for the Zangi (present-day Hrazdan) river passing through the territory, Zangibasar, which was located in northwest of the contemporary Ararat Province of Armenia, consisted of 30,000 Muslims in 26 villages some 9 kilometres (5.6 miles) southwest of Armenia's capital Yerevan—the principal town of the district was also named Zangibasar and now forms part of the town Masis. Despite Armenia appointing a local Azerbaijani official in the region, the latter's authority did not effectively extend from their post in Ulukhanlu (now also part of Masis) as it was undermined by the presence of Turkish and Azerbaijani envoys who were encouraging locals to sabotage infrastructure and to raid nearby Armenian villages—which many did with the help of Turkish soldiery.

=== Vedibasar ===
The district of Vedibasar constituted the south of the Ararat Province and was predominantly Azerbaijani-populated, with its key town in Boyuk Vedi (present-day Vedi). On 1 July 1919, raiders from Boyuk Vedi attacked the railway town of Davalu (present-day Ararat), killing several Armenian soldiers and civilians. 3 days later, a detachment of 400 soldiers of the Armenian army issued an ultimatum to Boyuk Vedi to surrender the raiders and the stolen belongings of the murdered, however, the rebels answered with machine-gun fire which scattered the detachment and caused a least 160 casualties. In the following 10 days, the Armenian army attempted to storm the village, though were unsuccessful due to the defenders being bolstered by Turkish officers. On 10 August 1919, General Drastamat Kanayan launched a counteroffensive which recaptured 5 rebelling villages and reached the heights of Boyuk Vedi, however, the town would not be retaken until the following year.

On 14 July 1919, the Azerbaijani envoy to Armenia Mahammad khan Takinski who played a "great role in the successful resistance of Muslims" dispatched the following note to the foreign minister of Azerbaijan:

The situation in Boyuk-Vedi is serious – Armenia is concentrating all of its forces and has announced military mobilisation. The local Muslims can be freed through Azerbaijan's armed intervention. ... The stubborn resistance of the Muslims has infuriated the English, however, the fight continues. In response to the Muslims' request for help, I announced that Azerbaijan cannot help with troops for now, but all of their losses and damages will immediately be compensated by Azerbaijan. Major events are planned in the entirety of the Sharur–Nakhichevan–Ordubad and Kars regions. Send large sums of money to military organisations without delay.

— Mahammad khan Takinski

Three days earlier, Takinski had apprised the Azerbaijani government of the unsuccessful Armenian counterattack at Boyuk Vedi which resulted in 200 casualties and led to the locals seizing "two artillery pieces and eight machine guns". Though the Armenians attributed their failure to the presence of Turkish soldiery, historian Jamil Hasanli writes that it was determined that there was "not a single Turkish soldier in these villages".

=== Sharur–Nakhichevan ===
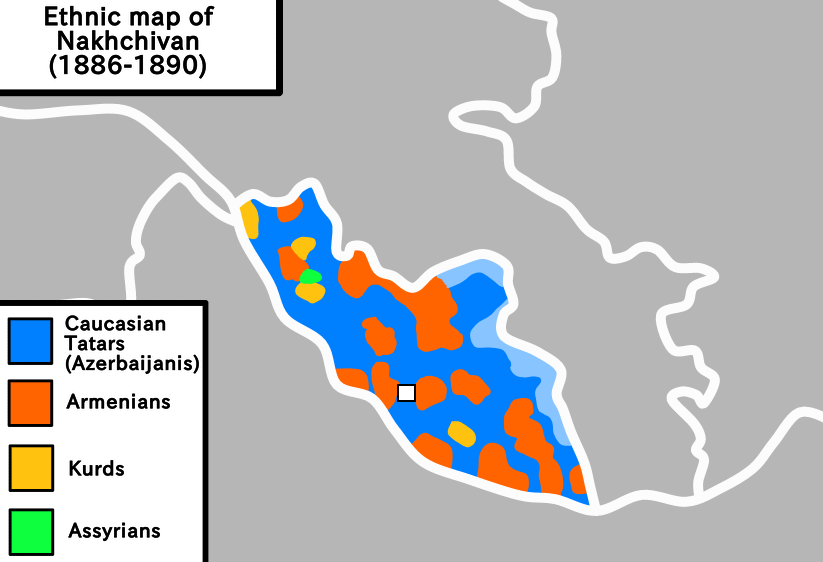
Ethnic map of Sharur–Nakhichevan

Encouraged by the uprisings near Yerevan, on 18 July 1919, Halil Sami Bey crossed the border from Doğubayazıt into Sharur to lead a local cavalry unit. The British command later received word that the Armenian authorities in Nakhichevan had become "powerless", as indicated by the inter-ethnic clashes that erupted over the following days. The city of Nakhchivan shortly thereafter became the center of an Armenian pogrom, thus the republic's administration over the region was shattered. On 21 July, Takinski reported to his government that Armenian governance had been ousted from Sharur. As the uprising spread throughout the Nakhichevan uezd, Armenians in Jugha (present-day Gülüstan) were forced to escape across the Aras river into Iran. Some 6,000 Armenians from Nakhichevan living in the Ararat Valley managed to escape to Daralayaz, the Nor Bayazet uezd, and the Zangezur uezd (present-day Vayots Dzor, Gegharkunik, and Syunik provinces, respectively). As a result of the uprising, Halil Sami Bey was responsible for the destruction of 45 Armenian villages and the massacre of 10,000 of their inhabitants in Sharur–Nakhichevan, including the destruction of the large Armenian-populated town of Verin Agulis (present-day Yuxarı Əylis) and its 1,400 inhabitants. Later in the year, Azerbaijani general Samed bey Mehmandarov complained to his government about the presence of Iranian agents trying to entice Muslim refugees in Sharur–Nakhichevan to seek refuge in Iran.

=== Suppression ===
On 18 June 1920, some months after the Red Army invasion of Azerbaijan in April, Armenia issued an ultimatum to the rebels of Zangibasar some 15 kilometres (9.3 miles) southwest of Yerevan to submit to Armenian rule. Having no expectation that the ultimatum would be answered, the Armenian army launched an offensive to recapture the rebelling villages on the following day. In the fight for Zangibasar, Lieutenant Aram Kajaznuni, the son of the first prime minister of Armenia was killed, however, the Armenians were victorious on 21 June and had secured the peripheries of Yerevan, however, the locals (mainly Tatars, later known as Azerbaijanis) fled into the neighboring Surmalu uezd to Aralık to avoid retribution. After the battle, volunteer detachments consisting of Armenian refugees from the Aresh and Nukha uezds of Azerbaijan looted the abandoned homes.

The voices of the militaristic factions in the Armenian government were strengthened by the successes in Zangibasar and Olty, therefore, the army prepared to retake the districts of Vedibasar and Sharur–Nakhichevan; the advance into the former began on 11 July and by the next day, Armenian forces had recaptured the district and Boyuk Vedi, reaching the boundary of the Erivan and Sharur-Daralayaz uezds at the mountain pass known as the Volchi vorota (Волчьи ворота, 'Wolf gate')—this again caused the local Muslims to flee, now southward to Sharur.

On 14 July, the Armenian advance continued through the Volchi vorota into the Sharur district, capturing it 2 days later whilst the locals fled across the Aras river into Iran. Before the Armenians could advance into the Nakhchevan uezd proper, the national council (Azerbaijani: milli şura) of Nakhichevan appealed for peace, however, the negotiations only served in delaying Armenia's advance, after which the town of Şahtaxtı some 40 kilometres (25 miles) northwest of Nakhichevan was captured. By this time, the 11th Army of Soviet Russia which had previously invaded Azerbaijan reached southern Nakhichevan to form a link with Nationalist Turkey. Colonel Tarkhov, the commander of the "united troops of the Soviet Russia and Red Turkey in Nakhichevan" in addressing the Armenians in Şahtaxtı proclaimed Soviet rule over the rest of Nakhichevan, thereby ending the Armenian campaign.

During the campaign, the Persian ministry of foreign affairs tried to delay the Armenian advance for a few days, stating that "the inhabitants of Nakhichevan were petitioning for protection through the sardar of Maku and the authorities at Tabriz" and that as the rebels were "former Persian subjects and overwhelmingly Shia", the government "could not remain indifferent to their appeal."

== Turko-Kurdish uprisings ==
=== Surmalu ===
The Surmalu uezd was the site of large-scale inter-ethnic clashes between Armenians and Muslims in early 1918, during the Ottoman advance—following the latter's withdrawal from the county, Armenians from Van and Sasun provided for the repatriation of Armenians in Surmalu. The following year, whilst the uprisings in the Erivan uezd raged, partisans in Aralikh led by a Turkish officer from Erzurum attacked the Armenian army to relieve pressure on rebelling Boyuk Vedi. In early August, Kurdish tribesmen led by Shamil bey Airumlinsky ousted the thinly stretched Armenian garrison from the peripheries of Surmalu, forcing hundreds of Armenian and Yazidi civilians to flee to Iğdır, later causing many to flee across the Aras river into the neighboring Etchmiadzin uezd (present-day Armavir and Aragatsotn provinces) to escape the raids. Thereafter, Armenian rule was limited to the plains of the Surmalu uezd around the administrative center Iğdır. The Kurdish raids continuing into September were answered by Turkish-Armenian detachments, during which rebelling Kurdish villages were burned.

=== Kağızman ===
On 17 August 1919, more than a thousand Kurdish tribesmen led by Omar Agha and Hasan Bey fought the Armenian garrison commanded by Colonel Shaghrutyan near Kağızman in the Kagizman Okrug, demanding that the Armenians withdraw from the region. The following day, the Armenians successfully pushed the Kurds away from the town, two days later pushing the Kurds to the hills. Clashes continued on 28–30 August when a Kurdish attempt to encircle Armenian forces in Sarıkamış was thwarted, causing the former to retreat to the heights of Başköy and Verishan (present-day Gürbüzler). Two days later, the Armenians captured the peak Gümrüdağı, forcing the tribesmen to retreat to Barduz (present-day Gaziler). As a result of roads and railway being severed by Kurdish and Turkish partisans, 6,000 Armenian and Greek peasants fled from Sarıkamış. In early September the Armenian army regained control over the republic's former borders in Kars and repatriated the Armenian, Greek, and Russian peasants who had fled the insurgents. The raiders in their retreat were accompanied by Turkish and Kurdish refugees and civilians fleeing from the areas recaptured by Armenia.

=== Ardahan–Kars ===
Since its annexation of the Kars Oblast, the Armenian administration had delegated authority to local Muslim officials in the subdistricts Çıldır (consisting of 40 Muslim villages), Aghbaba (present-day Amasia, consisting of 42 Muslim villages), and Zarushad (present-day Arpaçay, consisting of 45 Muslim and 20 Russian sectarian villages) to ensure their loyalty—these subdistricts laid within the districts (округы, okrugy) of Ardahan and Kars. Despite the presence of Turkish and Azerbaijani provocateurs carrying large sums of money in the region, Armenia did not attempt to disarm the local population. The provocateurs on 12 January 1920 intended to train a local militia from the population of the villages to occupy the railway passing the Armenian-populated town of Kizil-Chakhchakh (present-day Akyaka). On 24 January, the Armenian administration was completely ousted from Chaldyr, Aghbaba, and Zarushad—the following day, martial law was declared in the district. The Armenian army led by Colonel Hovhannes Mazmanyan on 28 January unsuccessfully utilised the local "coldly neutral" Russian Molokans of Zarushad as representatives to demand that the rebelling Muslims submit to Armenia. Shortly thereafter, on 1 February, the Armenian army shelled, set fire to, and occupied a number of rebelling villages, effectively routing the rebels of Zarushad. Nine days later, Zarushad's leaders officially accepted Armenian authority, and later confirmed it in-person to the provincial administration in Kars. Chaldyr later submitted on 14 March, however, the Armenian army continued to shell their settlements. The uprising and subsequent countermeasures had resulted in the displacement of up to 10,000 inhabitants of 20 villages, many of whom sought refuge in Azerbaijan.

=== Penek ===
Occurring simultaneously with the Armenian counteroffensive against the rebels of Zangibasar, an attempt was made to seize the coal reserves in Penek in the Kurdish-controlled Olti Okrug (present-day eastern Erzurum Province). Armenian policy towards integration of Muslim areas was divided between peaceful civilian incorporation with local autonomy, and military invasion and threats, ultimately, the latter policy prevailed in the case of Olty, to the chagrin of the governor-general of Kars. Armenian and Turkish reports confirmed the presence of Turkish soldiers operating in the district; despite this, the Armenian offensive to capture the western half of the okrug began on 19 June 1920. By 22 June, the Armenian army had converged on Penek and ousted its Turko-Kurdish defenders, setting the new Armenian–Turkish frontier at the Oltu river

== Allied reaction ==
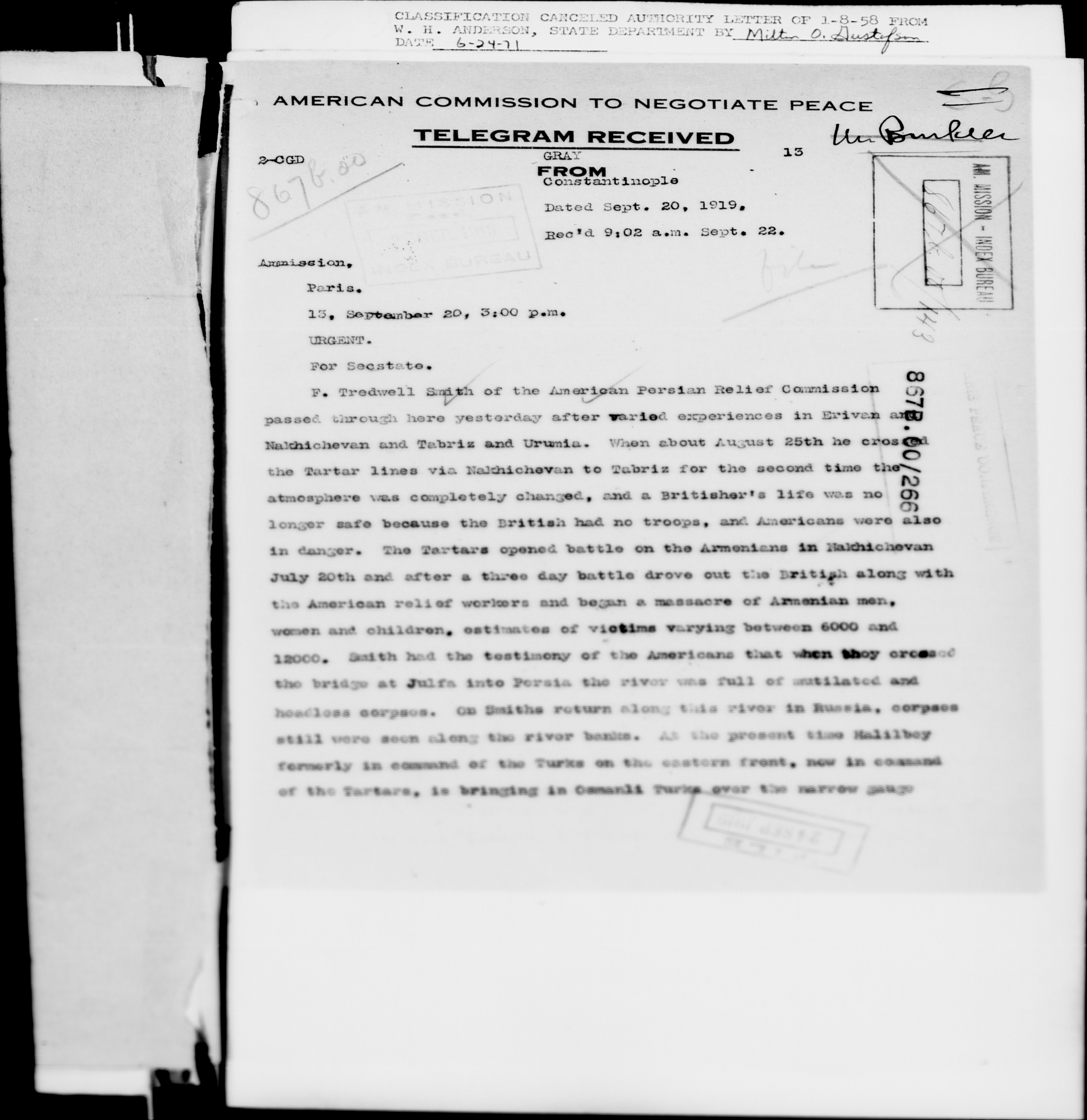
American Commission to Negotiate Peace telegram describing massacres around Nakhichevan

=== Proposed neutral zone ===
William N. Haskell, the Allied High Commissioner for Armenia, only a week after the subjugation of the Karabakh Council to Azerbaijan suggested the creation of a neutral zone in the south of Erivan Governorate including the rebelling districts of Sharur–Nakhichevan. On 29 August 1919, Fatali Khan Khoyski, the Prime Minister of Azerbaijan, agreed to the arrangement with modifications, such as the inclusion of the Armenian-controlled Daralayaz region in the neutral zone, also providing that Azerbaijan would bear the operational expenses of such an entity and provide for the construction of a railway between Julfa and Baku. When Haskell brought this agreement before Armenian officials, already signed by the Khoyski, it was rejected due to the implication it would create of the region becoming a technical part of Azerbaijan, and that it would include the Daralayaz sub-district of the Sharur-Daralayaz uezd, which was under stable Armenian control and served as a vital connection between Yerevan and Armenian-controlled Zangezur. Armenian officials insisted on an American governorship to be created, limited in size to the areas under control of insurgents, however, this was rejected by the Azerbaijani government as it would not achieve its aim of severing Zangezur from Armenia.

=== American investigation ===
In the investigation by American relief workers, it was discovered that there were 7,000 Armenian refugees from Sharur in addition to 2,400 who had remained in one of the eight villages unable to return to their homes. Halil Sami Bey, in representing the rebel authorities of Nakhichevan, declared in a meeting with American officials that they would never allow the region to be ruled by Armenia again. One of the American relief officials involved in the investigation, Clarence Ussher, reported that practically all the Armenian villages in Nakhichevan–Sharur had been abandoned or repossessed by the local Muslims.

=== Russian arms ===
Armenian-American historian Richard G. Hovannisian argues that it was in the interest of Anton Denikin, the leader of the Volunteer Army, to protect Armenia because their existence prevented "Turkish intrusion into the Caucasus" which could jeopardise Russian military operations in the North Caucasus. Additionally, so long as Azerbaijan and Georgia suspected a secret military alliance between Armenia and South Russia, they couldn't focus all of their military forces against Denikin. In early September, 3 million rounds of ammunition were sent from the Armed Forces of South Russia to Armenia.

== Aftermath ==
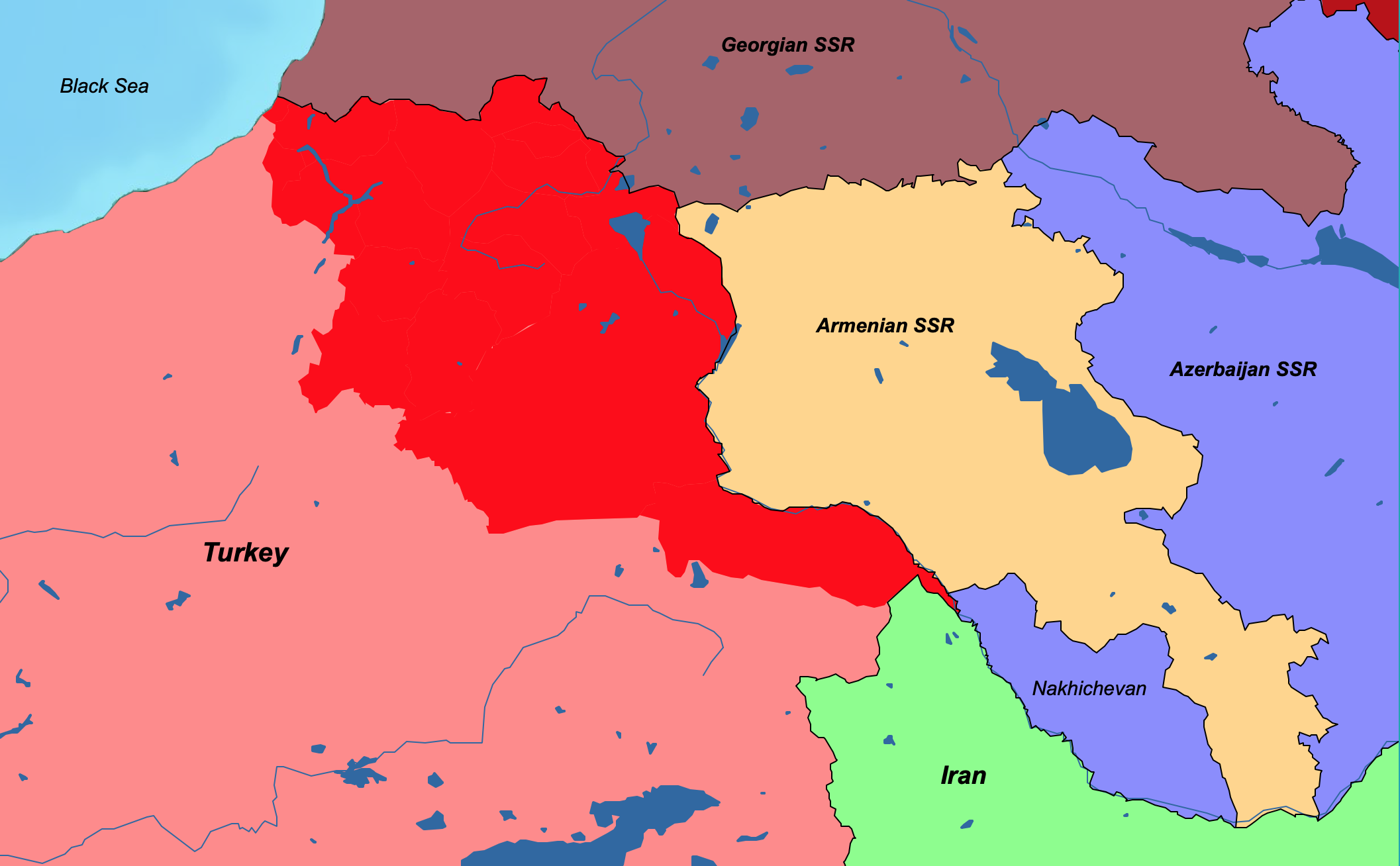
Map of the Treaty of Kars (1921) showing the losses of Kars and Surmalu to Turkey

Some 5 months after the last uprising was suppressed, in December 1920 the Armenian republic was partitioned between Soviet Russia and Kemalist Turkey, ending its two and a half years of existence. The entirety of the Surmalu and Kars regions (except Aghbaba sub-county (Агбабинский участок)) (Note: Excluding the ethnically Karapapakh villages of İbişköy and Kayadöven.) were ceded to the Government of the Grand National Assembly and emptied of its Armenian population, as confirmed in the 1921 treaties of Kars and Moscow. Conversely, most of the Erivan uezd was retained by Soviet Armenia, with the southernmost section forming the Nakhichevan ASSR of Soviet Azerbaijan; the Sharur sub-county of the Sharur-Daralayaz uezd and most of the Nakhichevan uezd was also ceded to the latter.

== Bibliography ==
- "Ագուլիսի կոտորածը եւ պատժիչ պատասխանը" [The massacre of Agulis and the punitive response]. Republic.Mediamax.am (in Armenian). Archived from the original on 24 July 2022.
- Allen, William Edward David; Muratoff, Paul (2011). Caucasian Battlefields: a History of the Wars on the Turco-Caucasian Border 1828–1921. Cambridge: Cambridge University Press. ISBN 978-0-511-70873-2. OCLC 889946392.
- American Commission to Negotiate Peace. Constantinople. 20 September 1919.
- Bechhofer Roberts, Carl Eric (1921). In Denikin's Russia And The Caucasus, 1919–1920: Being A Record Of A Journey To South Russia, The Crimea, Armenia, Georgia, And Baku In 1919 And 1920.
- Der Matossian, Bedross, ed. (2020). The First Republic of Armenia (1918–1920): On its Centenary: Politics, Gender, and Diplomacy. Fresno: The Press at California State University. ISBN 978-0912201672. OCLC 1162163551.
- "Չհայտարարված պատերազմը թեժանում է" [Undeclared War Heats Up]. Republic.Mediamax.am (in Armenian). Archived from the original on 25 July 2022.
- Hakobyan, Tatul (19 August 2017). "The Muslim Revolts in Armenia in 1919–1920". ANI Armenian Research Center. Archived from the original on 1 November 2022.
- Hasanli, Jamil (2015). Foreign Policy of the Republic of Azerbaijan: The Difficult Road to Western Integration, 1918–1920. London: Routledge. ISBN 978-1-317-36616-4.
- Hamid, Tural (31 March 2021). "Establishment of the Nakhchivan ASSR (Part One)". Aze.Media. Archived from the original on 1 November 2022.
- Hakobyan, Tatul (1 January 2023). "Քաջազնունու նամակը որդուն՝ Ռուբենին, գրված Երևանից 1933թ հունվարի 1-ին" [Kajaznuni's letter to his son Ruben, written from Yerevan on January 1st 1933]. ANI Armenian Research Center (in Armenian). Archived from the original on 3 January 2023.
- "Հայաստանի զորքերը գրավում են Զանգիբասարը [այսօր՝ Մասիս]․ 23 հունիս, 1920" [Armenian forces capture Zangibasar (now Masis): 23 June 1920]. ANI Armenian Research Center (in Armenian). 23 June 2021. Archived from the original on 20 October 2022.
- "Հայաստանի կապերը Դենիկինի եւ Կոլչակի հետ" [Armenia's ties to Denikin and Kolchak]. Republic.Mediamax.am (in Armenian).
- Hovannisian, Richard G. (1967). Armenia on the Road to Independence, 1918. Berkeley: University of California Press. ISBN 0-520-00574-0. OCLC 825110.
- Hovannisian, Richard G. (1971). The Republic of Armenia: The First Year, 1918–1919. Vol. 1. Berkeley: University of California Press. ISBN 978-0520019843.
- Hovannisian, Richard G. (1974). "Dimensions of Democracy and Authority in Caucasian Armenia, 1917-1920". The Russian Review. 33 (1): 37–49. doi:10.2307/127620. ISSN 0036-0341. JSTOR 127620.
- Hovannisian, Richard G. (1980). Caucasian Armenia Between Imperial and Soviet Rule: The Interlude of National Independence (PDF). Los Angeles: University of California.
- Hovannisian, Richard G. (1982). The Republic of Armenia: From Versailles to London, 1919–1920. Vol. 2. Berkeley: University of California Press. ISBN 978-0520041868.
- Hovannisian, Richard G. (1996). The Republic of Armenia: From London to Sèvres, February–August 1920. Vol. 3. Berkeley: University of California Press. ISBN 978-0520088030.
- "Կարսի մարզի Զարուշատի մահմեդական շրջանը հպատակվում է Հայաստանին․ 15 փետրվարի, 1920" [The Zarushad Muslim region of the Kars Oblast is subjected to Armenia. February 15, 1920]. ANI Armenian Research Center. 15 February 2022. Archived from the original on 10 November 2022.
- Kayaloff, Jacques (1972). "From the Transcaucasian Past: Two Documents About Turkish Resistance in 1918". Journal of Asian History. 6 (2): 123–132. ISSN 0021-910X. JSTOR 41930020.
- "New Republics in the Caucasus: Armenia, Azerbaidjan, and Georgia: Their Mutual Relations and Their Present Status". Current History. 11 (3). University of California Press: 491–498. 1920. JSTOR 45325199.
- Payaslian, Simon (2007). "The Republic of Armenia: The First Republic". The History of Armenia: From the Origins to the Present. New York: Palgrave Macmillan US. pp. 145–170. doi:10.1057/9780230608580_7. ISBN 978-0-230-60858-0.
- "Պայքար Նախիջեւանի համար" [Struggle for Nakhichevan]. Republic.Mediamax.am (in Armenian). Archived from the original on 24 July 2022.
- Somakian, Manough Joseph (1992). Tsarist and Bolshevik Policy Towards the Armenian Question 1912-1920 (PDF). London: University of London. Archived from the original (PDF) on 25 July 2022.
- Tsutsiev, Arthur (2014). Atlas of the Ethno-Political History of the Caucasus. Translated by Nora Seligman Favorov. New Haven: Yale University Press. ISBN 9780300153088.
- "Վեդիբասարի գրավումը" [Capture of Vedibasar]. Republic.Mediamax.am (in Armenian). Archived from the original on 20 September 2022.
- "Զանգիբասարի եւ Օլթիի գրավումը" [Capture of Zangibasar and Olti]. Republic.Mediamax.am (in Armenian). Archived from the original on 24 July 2022.
