= Aregnadem =

Village in Shirak, Armenia

Aregnadem Արեգնադեմ
- Location within Armenia Location within Shirak
- Coordinates: 40°55′43″N 43°44′57″E
- Country: Armenia
- Province: Shirak
- Municipality: Amasia
- Elevation: 1,850 m (6,070 ft)

Population (2011)
  - Total: 388
- Time zone: UTC+4
  - Summer (DST): UTC+5

Aregnadem (Armenian: Արեգնադեմ) is a village in the Amasia Municipality of the Shirak Province of Armenia.

== History ==
Aregnadem village was founded at end of 17th century and was called Gharachanta (Latinized Armenian spelling of Karaçanta, meaning black bag in Turkish). It was part of Aghbaba uchastok of Kars Okrug in Kars Oblast between 1878 and 1918. It was passed to Soviet Armenia according to treaties of Moscow and Kars in 1921. It was renamed Azizbekov in honour of Mashadi Azizbeyov, one of the 26 Baku Commissars on 4 May 1939. Prior to 1988, the village was populated by Azerbaijanis, whereby "there was not a single Armenian family". The village was refounded in 1988 by Armenians from Georgia, Azerbaijan and Gyumri in 1988, after it. Finally, it took present name on 3 April 1991.

== Demographics ==
The Statistical Committee of Armenia reported its population was 388 in 2011, down from 407 at the 2001 census.

The population of the village since 1897 is as follows:

Historical population
Year	Pop.	±% p.a.
1897	440	—
1926	625	+1.22%
1939	774	+1.66%
1959	803	+0.18%
1970	1,442	+5.47%
1980	1,490	+0.33%
1989	128	−23.87%
2001	407	+10.12%
2011	388	−0.48%
