= Shaghik =

Shaghik Շաղիկ
- Location within Armenia Location within Shirak
- Coordinates: 41°02′52″N 43°35′08″E
- Country: Armenia
- Province: Shirak
- Municipality: Amasia

Population (2011)
  - Total: 88
- Time zone: UTC+4
  - Summer (DST): UTC+5

Shaghik (Armenian: Շաղիկ) is a village in the Amasia Municipality of the Shirak Province of Armenia.

== Demographics ==
According to 1912 publication of Kavkazskiy kalendar, there was a mainly Karapapakh population of 373 in the village of Karabulag of the Kars Okrug of the Kars Oblast.

The population of the village since 1886 is as follows:

Historical population
Year	Pop.	±% p.a.
1886	185	—
1897	302	+4.56%
1959	145	−1.18%
1970	217	+3.73%
1979	239	+1.08%
1989	180	−2.80%
2001	85	−6.06%
2011	88	+0.35%
