= Voghji, Shirak =

Village in Shirak, Armenia

Voghji Ողջի
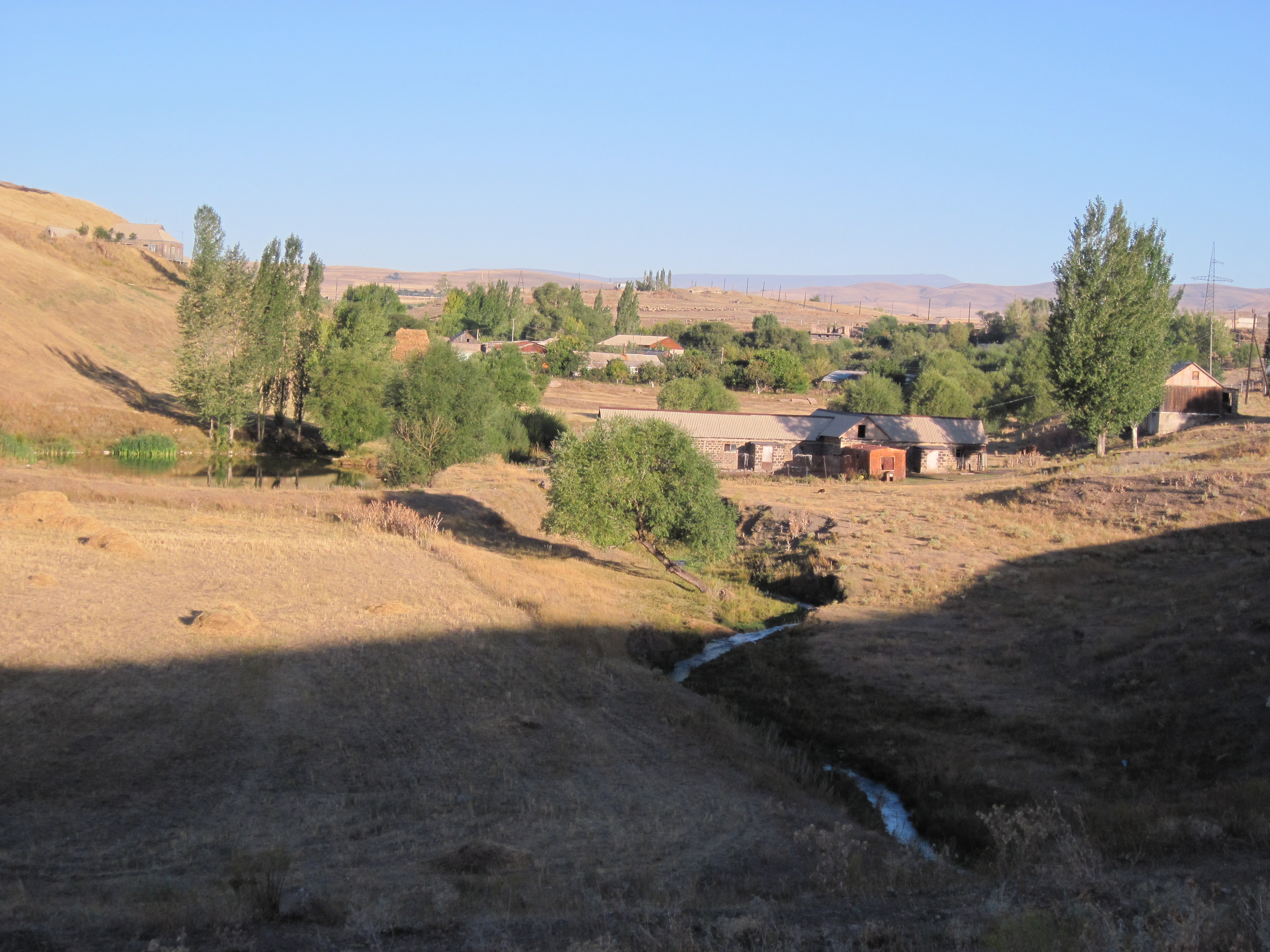

- Location within Armenia Location within Shirak
- Coordinates: 40°48′34″N 43°45′10″E
- Country: Armenia
- Province: Shirak
- Municipality: Amasia

Population (2011)
  - Total: 548
- Time zone: UTC+4

Voghji (Armenian: Ողջի) is a village in the Amasia Municipality of the Shirak Province of Armenia.

In 1988-1989, Azerbaijanis of the village moved to Azerbaijan, leading to Armenians from the Ninotsminda region of Georgia, the Spitak earthquake zone, and Azerbaijan to settle in the village.

== Demographics ==
According to 1912 publication of Kavkazskiy kalendar, there was a mainly Karapapakh population of 930 in the village of Okhchoglu of the Kars Okrug of the Kars Oblast.

The population of the village since 1886 is as follows:

Historical population
Year	Pop.	±% p.a.
1886	551	—
1897	747	+2.81%
1926	799	+0.23%
1939	1,093	+2.44%
1959	1,032	−0.29%
1970	1,412	+2.89%
1979	1,504	+0.70%
1989	110	−23.01%
2001	602	+15.22%
2011	548	−0.94%

== Gallery ==
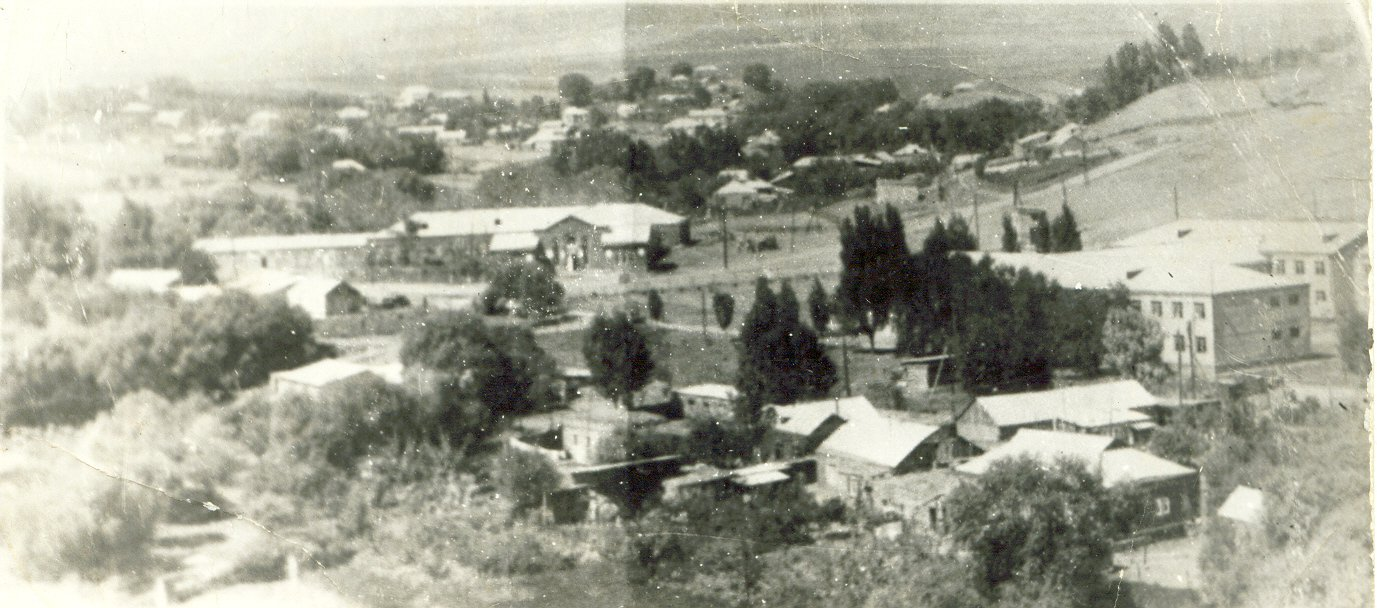
Village before exodus of Azerbaijanis

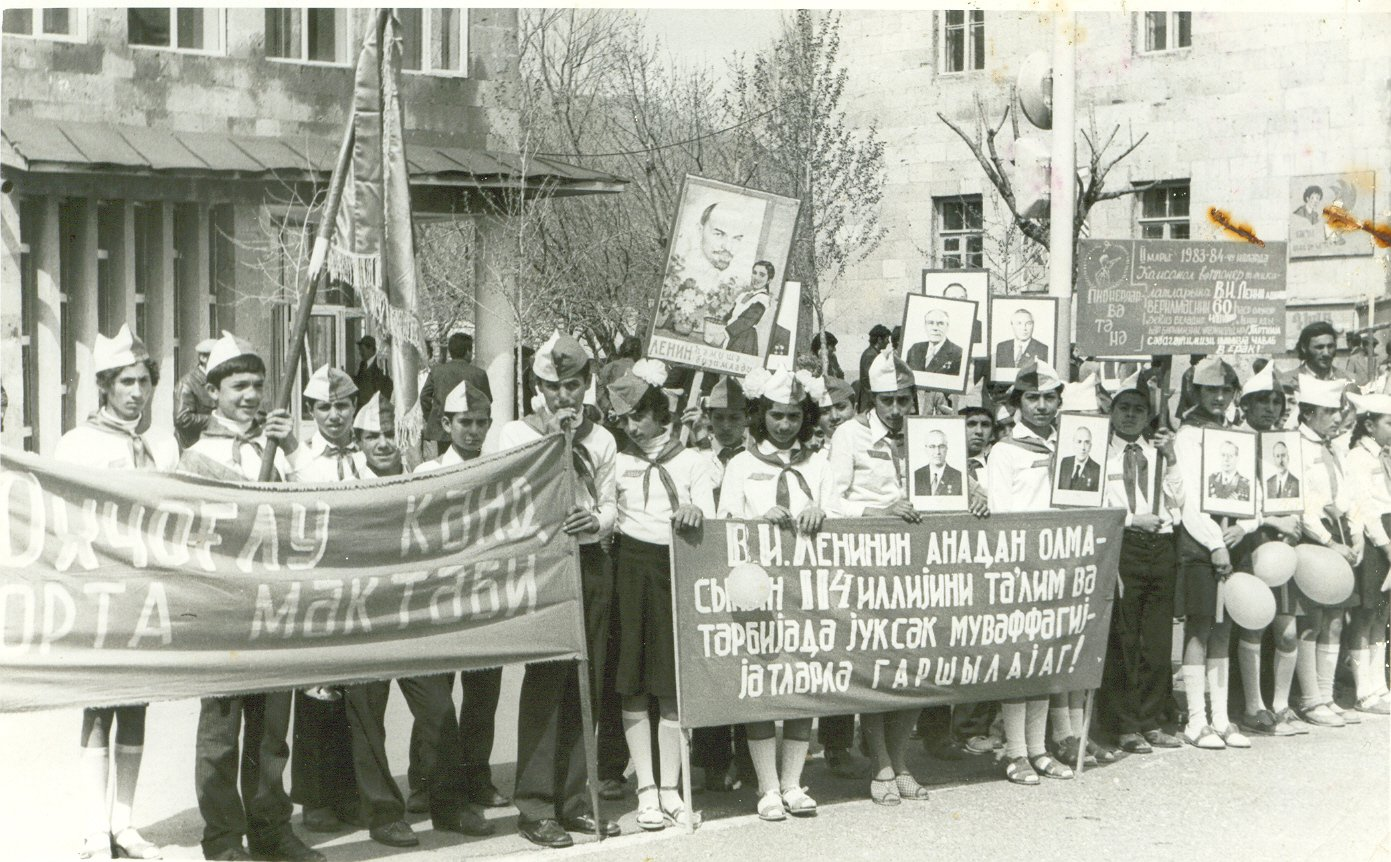
Azerbaijani pupil of Okhchuoghlu school, 1984
