= Ali Omarov =

Azerbaijani official

Prosecutor General of the Republic of Azerbaijan
- In office 3 July 1993 – 8 October 1994
- Succeeded by: Eldar Hasanov

Deputy of the National Assembly
- In office 1990–1995

Personal details
- Born: 10 September 1947 (age 78) Gёlli, Agbada settlement, Amasia, Shirak, Armenian SSR, Soviet Union
- Citizenship: Azerbaijan
- Children: 3
- Occupation: Attorney, Prosecutor

Military service
- Rank: Actual State Councillor of Justice (Army General of Justice)

Ali Omar oglu Omarov (Azerbaijani: Əli Ömər oğlu Ömərov) - Prosecutor General of the Republic of Azerbaijan (1993-1994), Actual State Councillor of Justice.

== Early life and career ==
Ali Omarov was born on 10 September 1947 in the village of Gёlli (now Ardenis) of Agbada settlement at Amasia region of the Armenian SSR. In 1973, he graduated from the correspondence department of the Faculty of Law of the Azerbaijan State University.

In 1973 during his compulsory army service, he was called to perform the function of the military investigator at the Dauriya Military Prosecutor's Office of the Chita Oblast (Russia) up to 1974 when being demobilized from the Soviet Army he joined the Interior Affairs Division of Amasia region of the Armenian SSR as the chief of external authorities security and voluntary police helpers department.

In 1976, he moved to Azerbaijan to act as a senior investigator and assistant to the Prosecutor's Office of the Nagorno Karabakh Autonomous Oblast (NKAO).

During the years of 1980 to 1983, he was a senior investigator at the Ganja (city) Prosecutor's Office, and then in 1983-1993 was transport prosecutor at the Ganja city.

In 1990, he was elected to the Supreme Soviet of Azerbaijan SSR, and in 1993 he was admitted to the National Assembly (Azerbaijan) (Parliament). He was the responsible secretary of the Commission on the Khojaly tragedy and acted as the main speaker on the perpetrators, the origin and the result of the tragedy, on the air, thus informing the whole world about the Khojaly tragedy.

Ali Omarov was appointed as Prosecutor General of the Republic of Azerbaijan on 3 July 1993. On 8 October 1994 he was relieved of his post by his own request. Ali Omarov since the day the Prosecutor's Office was established in of the Republic of Azerbaijan, he was the sole and only Prosecutor General who initiated criminal proceedings against the acting Ministry of Internal Affairs (Azerbaijan) and Minister of Defence and was able to remove them from their posts.

He was a member of the commission for the preparation of the Constitution of Azerbaijan.

Since 9 November 1993, Ali Omarov is only one person who has the highest special rank (class rate) – Actual State Councillor of Justice (Army General of Justice) not only in Azerbaijan but also in Caucasus as a whole.

Since 1993, he has been a real member of the executive committee of the International Interpol Bureau.

He is a member of the International Association of Prosecutors.
