= Tsaghkut =

Tsaghkut Ծաղկուտ
- Location within Armenia Location within Shirak
- Coordinates: 41°05′51″N 43°36′59″E
- Country: Armenia
- Province: Shirak
- Municipality: Amasia

Population (2011)
  - Total: 181
- Time zone: UTC+4

Tsaghkut (Armenian: Ծաղկուտ) is a village in the Amasia Municipality of the Shirak Province of Armenia.

== Demographics ==
According to the 1912 publication of Kavkazskiy kalendar, 365 people, mainly Karapapakhs, lived in the village of Gyullija in the Kars Okrug of the Kars Oblast.

The population of the village since 1886 is as follows:

Historical population
Year	Pop.	±% p.a.
1886	193	—
1897	288	+3.71%
1926	559	+2.31%
1939	624	+0.85%
1959	594	−0.25%
1979	985	+2.56%
1989	378	−9.13%
2001	209	−4.82%
2011	181	−1.43%
