= Byurakn =

Village in Shirak, Armenia

Byurakn Բյուրակն
- Location within Armenia Location within Shirak
- Coordinates: 40°52′07″N 43°42′26″E
- Country: Armenia
- Province: Shirak
- Municipality: Amasia
- Elevation: 1,730 m (5,680 ft)

Population (2011)
  - Total: 739
- Time zone: UTC+4

Byurakn (Armenian: Բյուրակն), until 4 July 2006 known as Gyullibulagh (Armenian: Գյուլլիբուլաղ), is a village in the Amasia Municipality of the Shirak Province of Armenia near the Armenia–Turkey border. The Statistical Committee of Armenia reported its population was 926 in 2010, up from 781 at the 2001 census.

== Demographics ==
According to the 1912 publication of Kavkazskiy kalendar, there was a mainly Karapapakh population of 1,046 people in the village of Gyullibulakh of the Kars Okrug of the Kars Oblast.

The population of the village since 1886 is as follows:

Historical population
Year	Pop.	±% p.a.
1886	673	—
1897	958	+3.26%
1926	1,142	+0.61%
1939	1,388	+1.51%
1959	1,529	+0.48%
1970	2,459	+4.41%
1979	2,580	+0.54%
1989	305	−19.23%
2001	781	+8.15%
2011	739	−0.55%
