= Ikhtiyar Shirinov =

Azerbaijani politician (1952–2022)

Prosecutor General of Azerbaijan
- In office 14 October 1992 – 30 June 1993
- Preceded by: Murad Babayev
- Succeeded by: Ali Omarov

Personal details
- Born: 1952 Beylagan District, Azerbaijan SSR, USSR
- Died: 15 November 2022 (aged 69–70)
- Party: Musavat (1992)
- Education: Baku State University Law School
- Occupation: Lawyer

Ikhtiyar Shirinov (Azerbaijani: İxtiyar Şirinov; 1952–15 November 2022) was an Azerbaijani lawyer and politician. A member of Musavat, he served as Prosecutor General from 14 October 1992 to 30 June 1993.

He served as State Advisor to the President of Azerbaijan, also from 14 October 1992, till 14 September 1993. Shirinov died on 15 November 2022.
