= Ellar =

Ellar may refer to:

- Ellar, Waldbrunn, a community in Waldbrunn, Hesse, Germany
- Illar, Tulkarm, or 'Ellar, a town in Palestine
- Lorasar, formerly Ellar, an abandoned village in Armenia
- Ellar Coltrane (born 1994), American actor
- Sofia Ellar (born 1993), Spanish singer and songwriter
