= Zarishat =

Village in Shirak, Armenia

Zarishat Զարիշատ
- Location within Armenia Location within Shirak
- Coordinates: 41°00′06″N 43°39′34″E
- Country: Armenia
- Province: Shirak
- Municipality: Amasia

Population (2011)
  - Total: 49
- Time zone: UTC+4

Zarishat (Armenian: Զարիշատ) is a village in the Amasia Municipality of the Shirak Province of Armenia.

== Demographics ==
According to 1912 publication of Kavkazskiy kalendar, there was a mainly Karapapakh population of 260 in the village of Gonjali of the Kars Okrug in the Kars Oblast.

The population of the village since 1897 is as follows:

Historical population
Year	Pop.	±% p.a.
1897	310	—
1926	120	−3.22%
1939	689	+14.39%
1959	321	−3.75%
1979	223	−1.80%
1989	60	−12.30%
2001	82	+2.64%
2011	49	−5.02%
