= Amasia =

Amasia may refer to:

- Amasya, a city in Northern Turkey
  - Amasya Province, which contains the city
  - Amasea (titular see), the former Metropolitan Archbishopric with see there, now a Latin Catholic titular see
- Amasia, Shirak, a town in Armenia
  - Amasia District, a former administrative district of Soviet Armenia and later of the Republic of Armenia
- Amasia, Armavir, a town in Armenia
- A Latin name for the Ems (river), a river in Germany and the Netherlands
- Amasia (supercontinent), a projection for the Earth's next supercontinent

== See also ==
- Amasiah
- Amaziah (disambiguation)
- Amazia
