= Ibish =

Ibish may refer to:

- Hussein Ibish, American author and Arab advocate
- Yerizak, Armenia
