= Ardenis =

Village in Shirak, Armenia

Ardenis Արդենիս
- Location within Armenia Location within Shirak
- Coordinates: 41°04′43″N 43°43′26″E
- Country: Armenia
- Province: Shirak
- Municipality: Amasia

Area
  - Total: 17.4 km^{2} (6.7 sq mi)
- Elevation: 2,050 m (6,730 ft)

Population (2011)
  - Total: 135
- Time zone: UTC+4
  - Summer (DST): UTC+5

Ardenis (Armenian: Արդենիս) is a village in the Amasia Municipality of the Shirak Province of Armenia.

== History ==
The village had a mixed Armenian–Azerbaijani population. During the Nagorno-Karabakh conflict, the Azerbaijani residents left for Azerbaijan.

== Demographics ==
According to 1912 publication of the Caucasian Calendar, 335 people, mainly Karapapaks, lived in village Gollu of Kars Okrug of Kars Oblast.

Statistical Committee of Armenia reported its population was 177 in 2010, up from 132 at the 2001 census.

The population of the village since 1897 is as follows:

Historical population
Year	Pop.	±% p.a.
1897	284	—
1926	316	+0.37%
1939	416	+2.14%
1959	470	+0.61%
1970	698	+3.66%
1979	757	+0.91%
1989	358	−7.21%
2001	132	−7.98%
2011	135	+0.22%
