= List of Prosecutors General of Azerbaijan =

Prosecutors General of the Republic of Azerbaijan
- Azərbaycan Respublikasının Baş Prokurorları
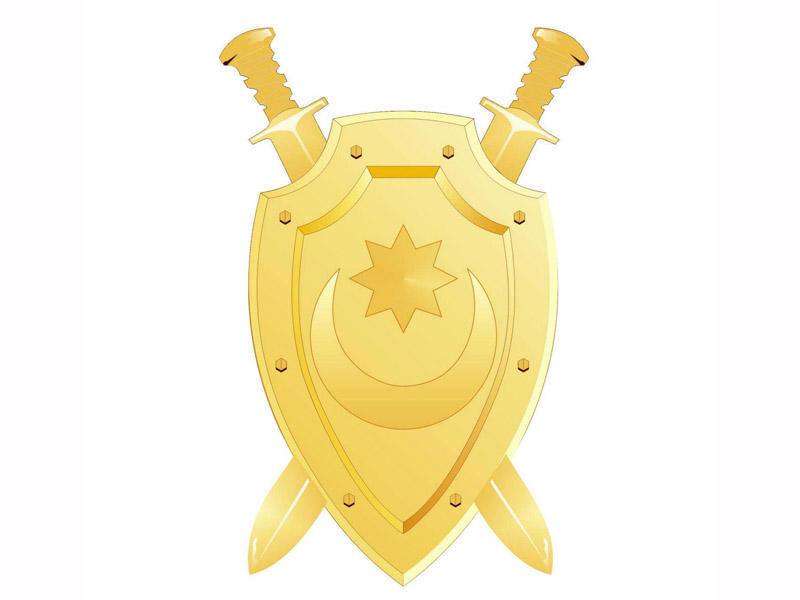
- Term length: Five years
- Website: www.genprosecutor.gov.az

This is a list of Prosecutors General of Azerbaijan from 1918 to the present day.

== Azerbaijan Democratic Republic ==
- Khalil Bey Khasmammadov (28 May 1918 – 17 June 1918 )
- Fatali Khan Khoyski (17 June 1918 – 7 December 1918 )
- Teymur Bey Makinski (26 December 1918 – 14 March 1919 )
- Aslan Bey Safikurdski (14 March 1919 – 22 December 1919 )
- Khalil Bey Khasmammadov (22 December 1919 – 1 April 1920 )

== Azerbaijan Soviet Socialist Republic ==
- Aliheydar Garayev (28 April 1920 – 1921)
- Ivanov (1921 – 1922)
- Bahadir Valibayov (1922 – 1926)
- Boyukaga Talibli (1926 – 1930)
- Husnu Hajiyev (1930– 1931)
- Boyukaga Talibli (1931 – 1932)
- Ayna Sultanova (1933 – 1934)
- Yagub Mammadov (1935 – 1936)
- Bahadir Valibeyov (1930 – 1937)
- Agahuseyn Alihuseynov (1938 – 1941)
- Jabrayil Jabrayilzade (1941 – 1943)
- Khalil Afandiyev (1943 – 1948)
- Aliabbas Aliyev (1948 – 1951)
- Haji Rahimov (1951 – 1954)
- Adil Babayev (1951 – 1954)
- Seyfulla Akbarov (1951 – 1963)
- Gambay Mammadov (1963 – 1976)
- Abbas Zamanov (1976 – 1985)
- Ilyas Ismayilov (1985 – 1990)

== Republic of Azerbaijan ==
#	Picture	Name	Term of office	
1		Ismat Gayibov	23 January 1990	29 May 1991
2		Murad Babayev	26 November 1991	14 October 1992
3		Ikhtiyar Shirinov	14 October 1992	30 June 1993
4		Ali Omarov	3 July 1993	8 October 1994
5		Eldar Hasanov	22 March 1995	21 April 2000
6		Zakir Garalov	25 April 2000	1 May 2020
7		Kamran Aliyev	1 May 2020	Incumbent
