= Kagizman okrug =

Coordinates: 40°09′30″N 43°08′03″E

Kagizman okrug Кагызманский округ
- Okrug
- Coat of arms

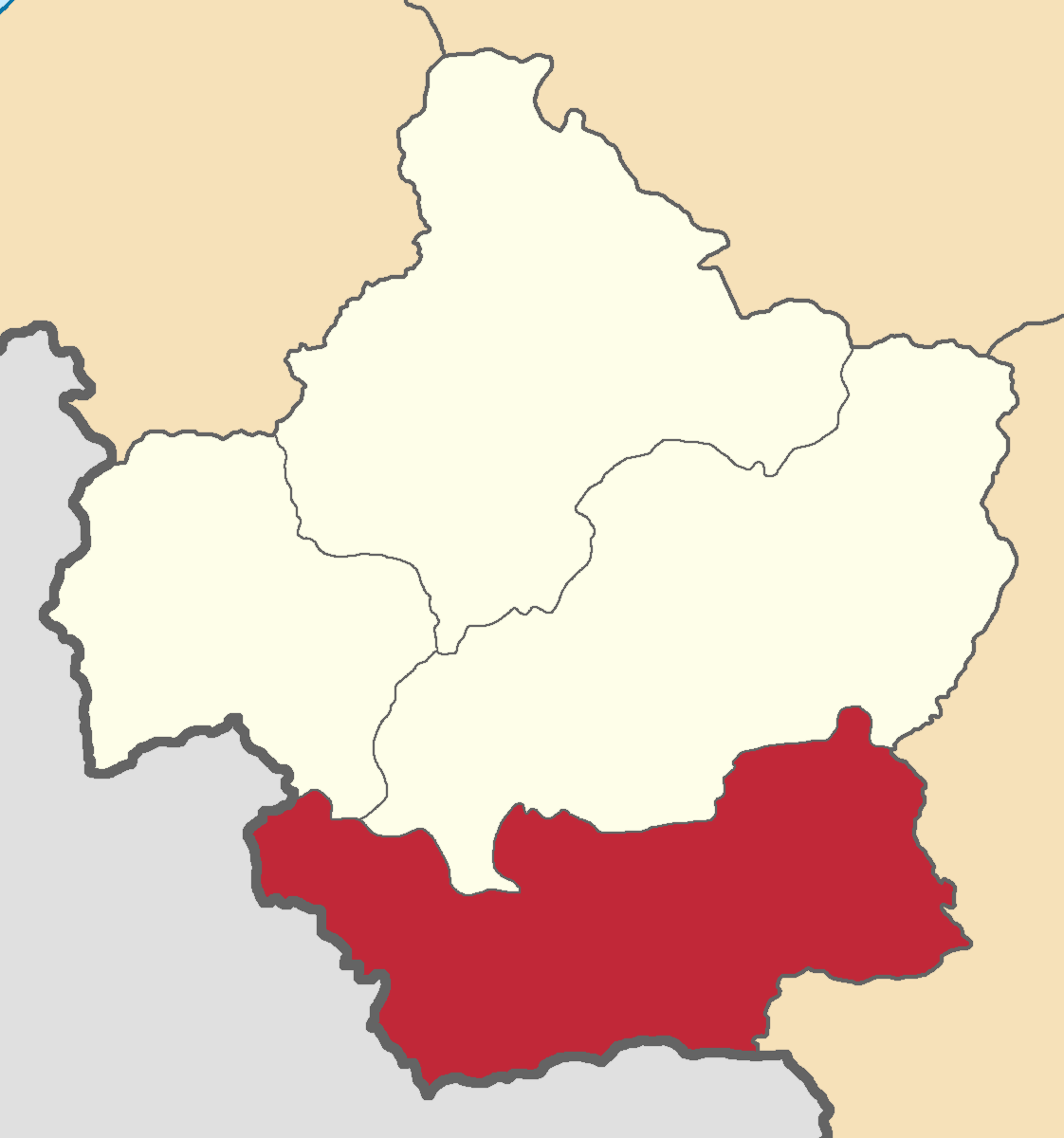
- Location in the Kars Oblast
- Country: Russian Empire
- Viceroyalty: Caucasus
- Oblast: Kars
- Established: 1878
- Treaty of Brest-Litovsk: 3 March 1918
- Capital: Kagyzman (present-day Kağızman)

Area
  - Total: 4,373.77 km^{2} (1,688.72 sq mi)

Population (1916)
  - Total: 83,208
  - Density: 19.024/km^{2} (49.273/sq mi)
  - Urban: 13.36%
  - Rural: 86.64%

The Kagizman okrug (Note: Russian: Кагызманский округ, pre-reform orthography: Кагызманскій округъ, romanized: Kagyzmanskiy okrug [kəɡɨzmənskʲɪj ɐkrʊk]; Turkish: Kağızman Okrugu [ca:ɯzman okɾuɡu]; Armenian: Կաղզվանի գավառ, classical orthography: Կաղզվանի գաւառ, romanized: Kaġzvani gawaṙ [kɑʁzvɑˈni ɡɑˈvɑr] (Note: Western Armenian pronunciation: [ɡɑʁzvɑˈni kʰɑˈvɑr])) was a district (okrug) of the Kars Oblast of the Russian Empire, existing between 1878 and 1918. Its capital was the town of Kagyzman (present-day Kağızman), presently in the Kars Province of Turkey. The okrug bordered with the Kars okrug to the north, the Olti okrug to the northwest, the Erivan Governorate to the east, and the Erzurum Vilayet of the Ottoman Empire to the west.

== History ==
The Kagizman okrug was one of the four territorial administrative subunits (counties) of the Kars Oblast created after its annexation into the Russian Empire in 1878 through the Treaty of San Stefano, following the defeat of the Ottoman Empire.

During the First World War, the Kars Oblast became the site of intense battles between the Russian Caucasus Army supplemented by Armenian volunteers and the Ottoman Third Army, the latter of whom was successful in briefly occupying Ardahan on 25 December 1914 before they were dislodged in early January 1915.

On 3 March 1918, in the aftermath of the October Revolution the Russian SFSR ceded the entire Kars Oblast including the Kagizman okrug through the Treaty of Brest-Litovsk to the Ottoman Empire, who had been unreconciled with its loss of the territory since 1878. Despite the ineffectual resistance of the Transcaucasian Democratic Federative Republic which had initially rejected the aforementioned treaty, the Ottoman Third Army was successful in occupying the Kars Oblast and expelling its 100,000 panic-stricken Armenian inhabitants.

The Ottoman Ninth Army under the command of Yakub Shevki Pasha, the occupying force of the district by the time of the Mudros Armistice, were permitted to winter in Kars until early 1919, after which on 7 January 1919 Major General G.T. Forestier-Walker ordered their complete withdrawal to the pre-1914 Ottoman-frontier. Intended to hinder the westward expansion of the fledgling Armenian and Georgian republics into the Kars Oblast, Yukub Shevki backed the emergence of the short-lived South-West Caucasus Republic with moral support, also furnishing it with weapons, ammunition and instructors.

The South-West Caucasus Republic administered the Kagizman okrug and neighboring formerly occupied districts for three months before provoking British intervention by order of General G.F. Milne, leading to its capitulation by Armenian and British forces on 10 April 1919. Consequently, the Kars Oblast largely came under the Armenian civil governorship of Stepan Korganian who wasted no time in facilitating the repatriation of the region's exiled refugees.

Despite the apparent defeat of the Ottoman Empire, Turkish agitators were reported by Armenian intelligence to have been freely roaming the countryside of Kars encouraging sedition among the Muslim villages, culminating in a series of anti-Armenian uprisings on 1 July 1919.

The Kars Oblast for the third time in six years saw invading Turkish troops, this time under the command of General Kâzım Karabekir in September 1920 during the Turkish-Armenian War. The disastrous war for Armenia resulted in the permanent expulsion of the region's ethnic Armenian population, many who inexorably remained befalling massacre, resulting in the region joining the Republic of Turkey through the Treaty of Alexandropol on 3 December 1920. Turkey's annexation of Kars and the adjacent Surmalu Uyezd was confirmed in the treaties of Kars and Moscow in 1921, by virtue of the new Soviet regime in Armenia.

== Administrative divisions ==
The prefectures (участки, uchastki) of the Kagizman okrug were:

Name	Administrative centre	1912 population	Area
Kagyzmanskiy prefecture (Кагызманский участок)	Kagyzman (Kağızman)	17,779	1,233.80 square versts (1,404.14 km^{2}; 542.14 mi^{2})
Nakhichevanskiy prefecture (Нахичеванский участок)	Digor	21,231	1,194.13 square versts (1,358.99 km^{2}; 524.71 mi^{2})
Khorosanskiy prefecture (Хоросанский участок)	Karakurt	19,771	1,415.24 square versts (1,610.63 km^{2}; 621.87 mi^{2})

== Demographics ==
=== Russian Empire Census ===
According to the Russian Empire Census, the Kagizman okrug had a population of 59,230 on 28 January [O.S. 15 January] 1897, including 33,344 men and 25,886 women. The plurality of the population indicated Armenian to be their mother tongue, with significant Kurdish, Greek, and Turkish speaking minorities.

Linguistic composition of the Kagizman okrug in 1897
Language	Native speakers	%
Armenian	21,648	36.55
Kurdish	17,733	29.94
Greek	7,245	12.23
Turkish	5,172	8.73
Russian	2,617	4.42
Ukrainian	1,431	2.42
Polish	895	1.51
Tatar (Note: Before 1918, Azerbaijanis were generally known as "Tatars". This term, employed by the Russians, referred to Turkic-speaking Muslims of the South Caucasus. After 1918, with the establishment of the Azerbaijan Democratic Republic and "especially during the Soviet era", the Tatar group identified itself as "Azerbaijani".)	867	1.46
Turkmen	659	1.11
Jewish	270	0.46
Lithuanian	236	0.40
German	99	0.17
Persian	70	0.12
Georgian	61	0.10
Belarusian	37	0.06
Estonian	31	0.05
Avar-Andean	21	0.04
Ossetian	10	0.02
Dargin	10	0.02
Karapapakh	2	0.00
Other	116	0.20
TOTAL	59,230	100.00

=== Kavkazskiy kalendar ===
According to the 1917 publication of Kavkazskiy kalendar, the Kagizman okrug had a population of 83,208 on 14 January [O.S. 1 January] 1916, including 43,589 men and 39,619 women, 72,638 of whom were the permanent population, and 10,570 were temporary residents. The statistics indicated an overwhelmingly Armenian population in the city of Kagizman, with a sizeable Sunni Muslim minority, however, in the rest of the okrug, Armenians formed the plurality of the population, followed closely by Kurd, Asiatic Christian, Yazidi, Sunni Muslim and Roma minorities:

Nationality	Urban		Rural		TOTAL	
Nationality	Number	%	Number	%	Number	%
Armenians	8,895	80.02	25,826	35.82	34,721	41.73
Kurds	0	0.00	20,677	28.68	20,677	24.85
Asiatic Christians	43	0.39	12,860	17.84	12,903	15.51
Yazidis	0	0.00	6,032	8.37	6,032	7.25
Sunni Muslims (Note: Primarily Turco-Tatars.)	2,067	18.59	2,546	3.53	4,613	5.54
Roma	0	0.00	2,580	3.58	2,580	3.10
Shia Muslims (Note: Primarily Tatars.)	62	0.56	1,075	1.49	1,137	1.37
Russians	43	0.39	464	0.64	507	0.61
North Caucasians	0	0.00	32	0.04	32	0.04
Other Europeans	6	0.05	0	0.00	6	0.01
TOTAL	11,116	100.00	72,092	100.00	83,208	100.00

== Bibliography ==
- Bournoutian, George A. (2018). Armenia and Imperial Decline: The Yerevan Province, 1900–1914. Milton Park, Abingdon, Oxon: Routledge. ISBN 978-1-351-06260-2. OCLC 1037283914.
- Hovannisian, Richard G. (1971). The Republic of Armenia. Vol. 1: The First Year, 1918–1919. Berkeley: University of California Press. ISBN 978-0520019843.
- Кавказский календарь на 1913 год [Caucasian calendar for 1913] (in Russian) (68th ed.). Tiflis: Tipografiya kantselyarii Ye.I.V. na Kavkaze, kazenny dom. 1913. Archived from the original on 19 April 2022.
- Кавказский календарь на 1917 год [Caucasian calendar for 1917] (in Russian) (72nd ed.). Tiflis: Tipografiya kantselyarii Ye.I.V. na Kavkaze, kazenny dom. 1917. Archived from the original on 4 November 2021.
- Tsutsiev, Arthur (2014). Atlas of the Ethno-Political History of the Caucasus (PDF). Translated by Nora Seligman Favorov. New Haven: Yale University Press. ISBN 9780300153088. Archived (PDF) from the original on 17 June 2023.
