= Garnarich =

Village in Shirak, Armenia

Garnarich Գառնառիճ
- Location within Armenia Location within Shirak
- Coordinates: 41°04′45″N 43°36′08″E
- Country: Armenia
- Province: Shirak
- Municipality: Amasia
- Elevation: 2,050 m (6,730 ft)

Population (2011)
  - Total: 210
- Time zone: UTC+4
  - Summer (DST): UTC+5

Garnarich (Armenian: Գառնառիճ) is a village in the Amasia Municipality of the Shirak Province of Armenia.

The community of Garnarich consists of the villages of Garnarich and Eghnajur. The Statistical Committee of Armenia reported the community's population was 273 in 2010, down from 288 at the 2001 census. The village's population was 260 at the 2001 census.

== Demographics ==
The population of the village since 1886 is as follows:

Historical population
Year	Pop.	±% p.a.
1886	222	—
1897	382	+5.06%
1926	463	+0.67%
1939	577	+1.71%
1959	546	−0.28%
1970	856	+4.17%
1979	996	+1.70%
1989	700	−3.47%
2001	260	−7.92%
2011	210	−2.11%
