= Paghakn =

Village in Shirak, Armenia

Paghakn Պաղակն
- Location within Armenia Location within Shirak
- Coordinates: 41°04′N 43°39′E
- Country: Armenia
- Province: Shirak
- Municipality: Amasia

Population (2011)
  - Total: 83
- Time zone: UTC+4
  - Summer (DST): UTC+5

Paghakn (Armenian: Պաղակն) is a village in the Amasia Municipality of the Shirak Province of Armenia.

== Demographics ==
The population of the village since 1886 is as follows:

Historical population
Year	Pop.	±% p.a.
1886	171	—
1897	249	+3.48%
1926	223	−0.38%
1939	341	+3.32%
1959	173	−3.34%
1970	219	+2.17%
1979	260	+1.93%
1989	55	−14.39%
1990	300	+445.45%
2001	39	−16.93%
2011	83	+7.85%
