= Meghrashat =

Village in Shirak, Armenia

Meghrashat Մեղրաշատ
- Location within Armenia Location within Shirak
- Coordinates: 40°51′N 43°42′E
- Country: Armenia
- Province: Shirak
- Municipality: Amasia

Population (2011)
  - Total: 325
- Time zone: UTC+4

Meghrashat (Armenian: Մեղրաշատ) is a village in the Amasia Municipality of the Shirak Province of Armenia.

== Demographics ==
The population of the village since 1886 is as follows:

Historical population
Year	Pop.	±% p.a.
1886	329	—
1897	457	+3.03%
1939	442	−0.08%
1959	425	−0.20%
1970	329	−2.30%
1979	283	−1.66%
1989	292	+0.31%
2001	371	+2.02%
2011	325	−1.32%
