= Kamkhut =

Kamkhut Կամխուտ
- village
- Location within Armenia Location within Shirak
- Coordinates: 40°54′N 43°42′E
- Country: Armenia
- Province: Shirak
- Municipality: Amasia

Population (2011)
  - Total: 2
- Time zone: UTC+4

Kamkhut (Armenian: Կամխուտ) is a village in the Amasia Municipality in the Shirak Province of Armenia.

== History ==
Armenians and Azeris once lived in the village, as well as Greeks, who even had a church, of which a half-ruined wall remains in the center of the village. In 1988-1989 Armenians from Akhalkalaki, Gyumri, Talin, Amasia and Nagorno-Karabakh settled in the village.

== Demographics ==
The population of the village since 1886 is as follows:

Historical population
Year	Pop.	±% p.a.
1886	222	—
1897	282	+2.20%
1926	252	−0.39%
1939	317	+1.78%
1959	230	−1.59%
1970	204	−1.08%
1979	245	+2.06%
1989	25	−20.41%
2011	2	−10.85%
