= Jradzor =

Village in Shirak, Armenia

Jradzor Ջրաձոր
- Location within Armenia Location within Shirak
- Coordinates: 40°54′54″N 43°46′19″E
- Country: Armenia
- Province: Shirak
- Municipality: Amasia

Population (2011)
  - Total: 237
- Time zone: UTC+4
  - Summer (DST): UTC+5

Jradzor (Armenian: Ջրաձոր) is a village in the Amasia Municipality of the Shirak Province of Armenia. It is located on the right bank of the Hoghmajur or Illiget River, a tributary of the Akhuryan.

== Etymology ==
The village was previously known as Jalab. It was renamed Jradzor in 1946.

== History ==
An old church and cemetery, as well as the remains of a fortification dating back to the second or first millennium BCE, are located in the village. Traces of a settlement dating back to the third millennium BCE have been discovered near the village school, including a large quantity of potter fragments and vessels. Tombs from the classical period were also unearthed in the same area, which appear to have been destroyed during the Middle Ages. In 1967, a large diatomite mine was discovered near the village.

As in many other settlements in Shirak Province, part of the village's population are descended from Armenians who migrated from the Western Armenian province of Basen in the nineteenth century. Jradzor was damaged during the 1988 Armenian earthquake.

During Soviet times, the village was included within the Amasia District of the Armenian SSR. In 1995 it became a part of Shirak Province and was later included in the Amasia rural community (municipality).

The village is planned to be relocated to make way for the construction of a reservoir.

== Demographics ==
The population of the village since 1831 is as follows:

Historical population
Year	Pop.	±% p.a.
1831	206	—
1897	646	+1.75%
1926	490	−0.95%
1939	663	+2.35%
1959	378	−2.77%
1970	343	−0.88%
1979	314	−0.98%
1989	298	−0.52%
2001	302	+0.11%
2011	237	−2.39%
