= Bandivan =

Bandivan Բանդիվան
- Location within Armenia Location within Shirak
- Coordinates: 40°57′22″N 43°48′11″E
- Country: Armenia
- Province: Shirak
- Municipality: Amasia
- Elevation: 1,940 m (6,360 ft)

Population (2011)
  - Total: 259
- Time zone: UTC+4
  - Summer (DST): UTC+5

Bandivan (Armenian: Բանդիվան) is a village in the Amasia Municipality of the Shirak Province of Armenia. The Statistical Committee of Armenia reported its population was 245 in 2010, down from 269 at the 2001 census.

== Population ==
The population of the village since 1831 is as follows:

Historical population
Year	Pop.	±% p.a.
1831	213	—
1897	806	+2.04%
1914	1,054	+1.59%
1916	309	−45.85%
1919	458	+14.02%
1926	392	−2.20%
1939	640	+3.84%
1959	376	−2.62%
1970	336	−1.02%
1979	315	−0.71%
1989	284	−1.03%
2001	269	−0.45%
2011	259	−0.38%
