= Darik =

Village in Shirak, Armenia

Darik Դարիկ
- Location within Armenia Location within Shirak
- Coordinates: 41°07′22″N 43°40′23″E
- Country: Armenia
- Province: Shirak
- Municipality: Amasia

Population (2011)
  - Total: 11
- Time zone: UTC+4

Darik (Armenian: Դարիկ) is a village in the Amasia Municipality of the Shirak Province of Armenia.

== Demographics ==
Historical population
Year	Pop.	±% p.a.
1897	96	—
1907	153	+4.77%
1926	243	+2.46%
1939	311	+1.92%
1959	147	−3.68%
1970	241	+4.60%
1979	264	+1.02%
1989	100	−9.25%
2001	12	−16.20%
2011	11	−0.87%
