= Hoghmik =

Hoghmik Հողմիկ
- Location within Armenia Location within Shirak
- Coordinates: 40°55′N 43°49′E
- Country: Armenia
- Province: Shirak
- Municipality: Amasia

Population (2011)
  - Total: 490
- Time zone: UTC+4
  - Summer (DST): UTC+5

Hoghmik (Armenian: Հողմիկ) is a village in the Amasia Municipality of the Shirak Province of Armenia.

== Demographics ==
The population of the village since 1831 is as follows:

Historical population
Year	Pop.	±% p.a.
1831	175	—
1897	762	+2.25%
1926	462	−1.71%
1939	736	+3.65%
1959	324	−4.02%
1970	417	+2.32%
1979	425	+0.21%
1989	379	−1.14%
2001	509	+2.49%
2011	490	−0.38%
