= Hovtun =

Village in Shirak, Armenia

Hovtun Հովտուն
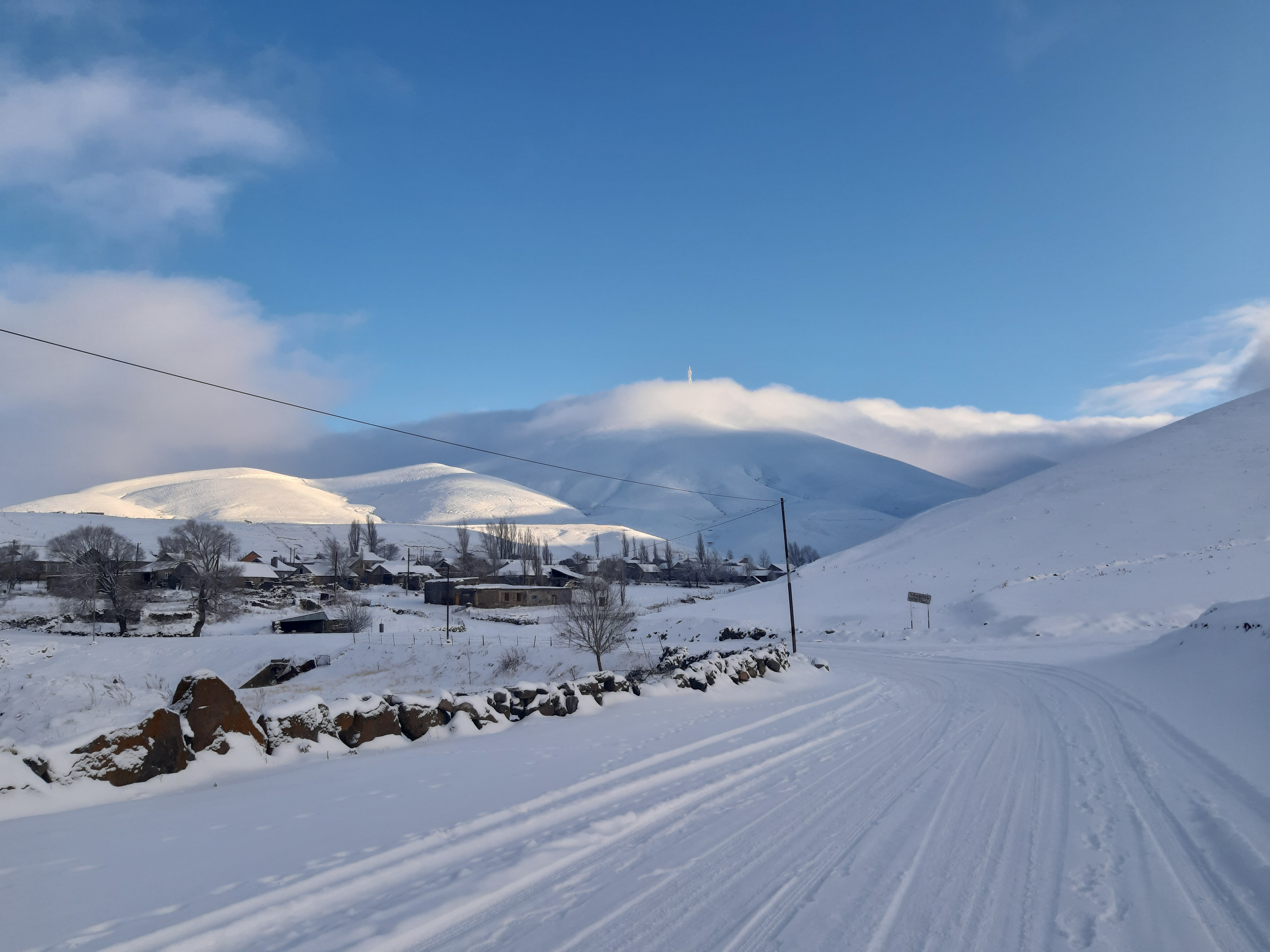
- Սեպ

- Location within Armenia Location within Shirak
- Coordinates: 40°58′N 43°49′E
- Country: Armenia
- Province: Shirak
- Municipality: Amasia

Population (2011)
  - Total: 154
- Time zone: UTC+4
  - Summer (DST): UTC+5

Hovtun (Armenian: Հովտուն) is a village in the Amasia Municipality of the Shirak Province of Armenia. The village was originally inhabited by Azerbaijanis, then Greeks, and now Armenians.

== Demographics ==
Historical population
Year	Pop.	±% p.a.
1831	27	—
1897	220	+3.23%
1926	352	+1.63%
1939	477	+2.37%
1959	236	−3.46%
1970	207	−1.18%
1979	253	+2.25%
1989	238	−0.61%
2001	190	−1.86%
2011	154	−2.08%
