= Yeghnajur =

Village in Shirak, Armenia

Yeghnajur Եղնաջուր
- Location within Armenia Location within Shirak
- Coordinates: 41°05′21″N 43°33′41″E
- Country: Armenia
- Province: Shirak
- Municipality: Amasia

Population (2011)
  - Total: 27
- Time zone: UTC+4

Yeghnajur (Armenian: Եղնաջուր) is a village in the Amasia Municipality of the Shirak Province of Armenia. Its population was 28 at the 2001 census.

== Demographics ==
Historical population
Year	Pop.	±% p.a.
1926	295	—
1939	349	+1.30%
1959	301	−0.74%
1970	522	+5.13%
1979	566	+0.90%
1989	67	−19.22%
2001	28	−7.01%
2011	27	−0.36%
