= Amasia, Armavir =

Village in Armavir, Armenia

Amasia Ամասիա
- Location within Armenia
- Coordinates: 40°05′N 43°58′E
- Country: Armenia
- Marz (Province): Armavir
- Founded: 1930

Population (2011)
  - Total: 850
- Time zone: UTC+4 ( )
  - Summer (DST): UTC+5 ( )

Amasia (Armenian: Ամասիա, also Romanized as Amasiya) is a village in the Armavir Province of Armenia.

== See also ==
- Armavir Province
