= Yerizak =

Abandoned village in Shirak, Armenia

Yerizak Երիզակ
- Location within Armenia Location within Shirak
- Coordinates: 40°59′N 43°39′E
- Country: Armenia
- Province: Shirak
- Municipality: Amasia
- Time zone: UTC+4

Yerizak (Armenian: Երիզակ) is an abandoned village in the Amasia Municipality of the Shirak Province of Armenia. The village was populated by Azerbaijanis before the exodus of Azerbaijanis from Armenia after the outbreak of the Nagorno-Karabakh conflict.

== Demographics ==
Historical population
Year	Pop.	±% p.a.
1897	118	—
1926	307	+3.35%
1939	278	−0.76%
1959	219	−1.19%
1970	400	+5.63%
1980	471	+1.65%
1989	101	−15.72%
