= Lorasar =

Abandoned village in Shirak, Armenia

Lorasar Լորասար
- Location within Armenia Location within Shirak
- Coordinates: 41°06′46″N 43°35′47″E
- Country: Armenia
- Province: Shirak
- Municipality: Amasia
- Time zone: UTC+4

Lorasar (Armenian: Լորասար) is an abandoned village in the Amasia Municipality of the Shirak Province of Armenia.

== Demographics ==
The population of the village since 1897 is as follows:

Historical population
Year	Pop.	±% p.a.
1897	361	—
1914	437	+1.13%
1926	284	−3.53%
1931	317	+2.22%
1959	165	−2.31%
1970	305	+5.74%
1980	652	+7.89%
1989	140	−15.71%
