= Treaty of Moscow (1921) =

Agreement firmed in 1921 between Russia and Turkey

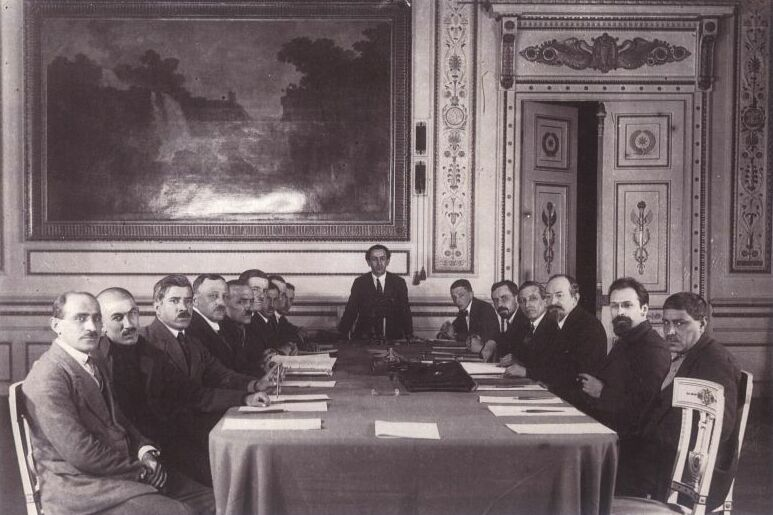
- Turkish committee members Rıza Nur, Yusuf Kemal Tengirşenk, Ali Fuat Cebesoy together with Russian members Georgy Chicherin and his deputy Lev Karakhan
- Type: Peace Treaty
- Signed: 16 March 1921
- Location: Moscow, Russian SFSR
- Condition: Ratification
- Signatories: (Ottoman Empire) Grand National Assembly of Turkey; (Russian Soviet Federative Socialist Republic) Russian SFSR
- Languages: Russian, French

The Treaty of Moscow, or Treaty of Brotherhood (Turkish: Moskova Antlaşması, Russian: Московский договор) was an agreement between the Grand National Assembly of Turkey (TBMM), under the leadership of Mustafa Kemal, and Russia, under the leadership of Vladimir Lenin, signed on 16 March 1921. Neither the Republic of Turkey nor the Soviet Union had then been established. The internationally recognised Turkish government at the time was that of Sultan Mehmed VI, but it was not party to the Treaty of Moscow. The Sultan's government had signed the Treaty of Sèvres, which had been repudiated by the Turkish National Movement.

== Key points ==
Under the Treaty of Moscow, both governments undertook to establish friendly relations between the countries. The treaty stipulated that the term "Turkey" in it meant the territories included in the National Oath, which had been adopted by the Ottoman Parliament on 28 January 1920. Article VI declared all treaties that had been concluded between Russia and Turkey to be null and void. Under Article II, Turkey ceded Batum and the adjacent area north of the village of Sarp to Soviet Georgia (the Kars Oblast went to Turkey).

Article III instituted an autonomous Nakhichevan district under Soviet Azerbaijan's protectorate. Under Article V, the parties agreed to delegate the final elaboration of the status of the Black Sea and the Turkish Straits to a future conference of delegates of the littoral states if the "full sovereignty" and security of Turkey and "her capital city of Constantinople" were not injured.

== Kars treaty ==
Turkey's borders, as well as those of Georgia, Armenia and Azerbaijan, as defined by the treaty as well as the nearly-identical Treaty of Kars (signed on October 13, 1921), are still in existence.

== 2015 Russian–Turkish tensions ==
After the shootdown of the Russian Sukhoi Su-24 over the Syria–Turkey border in November 2015 and the rise of Russian–Turkish tensions, members of the Communist Party of Russia proposed annulling the Treaty of Moscow. Initially, the Russian Foreign Ministry considered that action to send a political message to the government of Turkish President Recep Tayyip Erdoğan. However, Moscow ultimately decided against the idea in its effort to de-escalate tensions with Ankara.
