= Kars okrug =

Coordinates: 40.6069°N 43.0931°E

Kars okrug Карсский округ
- Okrug
- Coat of arms

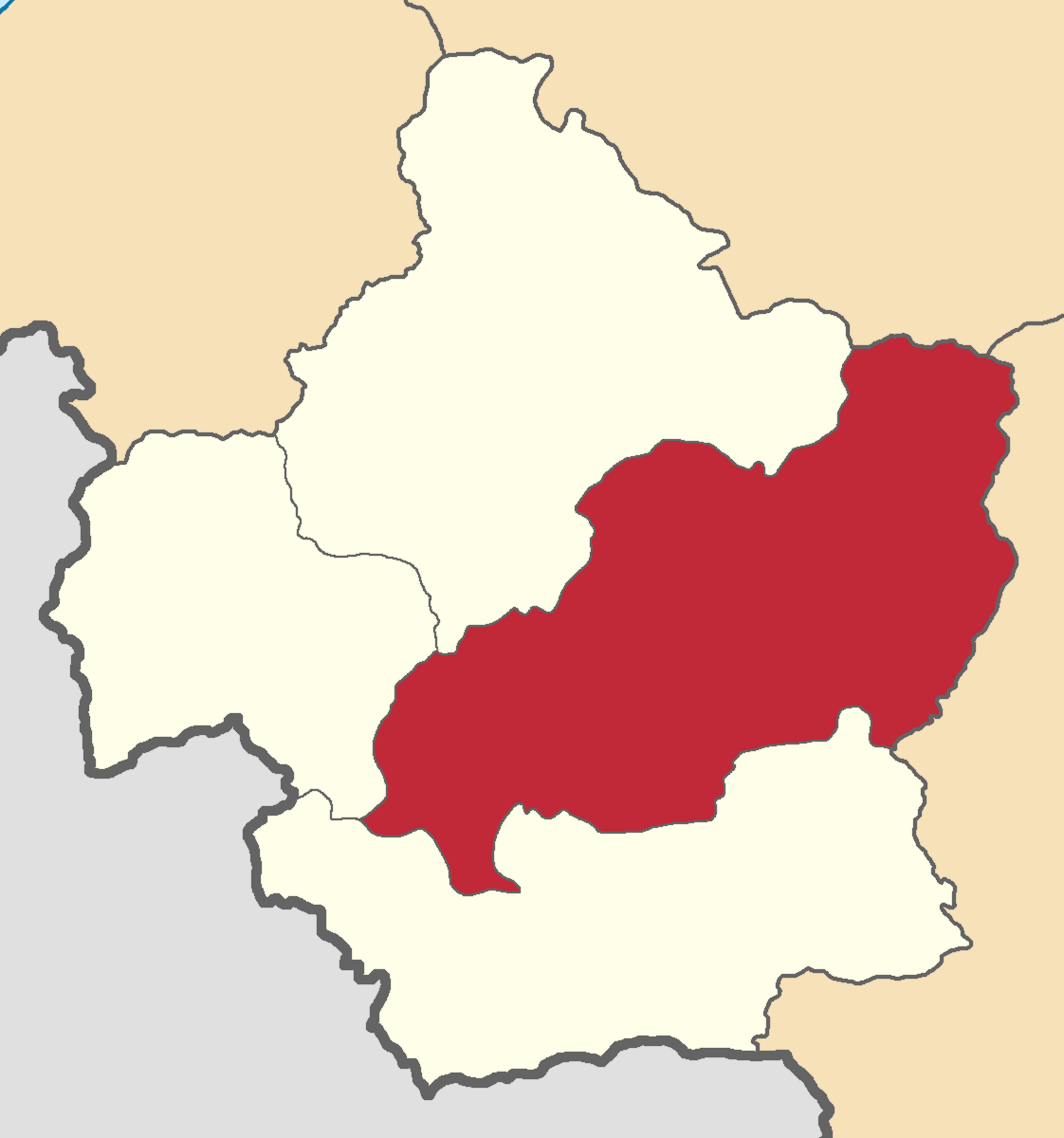
- Location in the Kars Oblast
- Country: Russian Empire
- Viceroyalty: Caucasus
- Oblast: Kars
- Established: 1878
- Treaty of Brest-Litovsk: 3 March 1918
- Capital: Kars

Area
  - Total: 5,785.69 km^{2} (2,233.87 sq mi)

Population (1916)
  - Total: 191,970
  - Density: 33.180/km^{2} (85.936/sq mi)
  - Urban: 15.90%
  - Rural: 84.10%

The Kars okrug (Note: Russian: Карсский округ, pre-reform orthography: Карсскій округъ, romanized: Karsskiy okrug [karskʲɪj ɐkrʊk]; Turkish: Kars Okrugu [kaɾs okɾuɡu]; Armenian: Կարսի գավառ, classical orthography: Կարսի գաւառ, romanized: Karsi gawaṙ [kɑɹˈsi ɡɑˈvɑr] (Note: Western Armenian pronunciation: [ɡɑɹˈsi kʰɑˈvɑr])) was a district (okrug) of the Kars Oblast of the Russian Empire between 1878 and 1918. Its capital was the city of Kars, presently part of the Kars Province of Turkey and the Amasia District of Armenia. The okrug bordered with the Ardahan okrug in the north, the Kagizman okrug in the south, the Olti okrug in the west, and the Erivan Governorate to its east.

== History ==
The Kars okrug was one of the four territorial administrative subunits (counties) of the Kars oblast created after its annexation into the Russian Empire in 1878 through the Treaty of San Stefano, following the defeat of the Ottoman Empire.

During World War I, the Kars Oblast became the site of intense battles between the Russian Caucasus Army supplemented by Armenian volunteers and the Ottoman Third Army, the latter of whom was successful in briefly occupying Ardahan on 25 December 1914 before they were dislodged in early January 1915.

On 3 March 1918, in the aftermath of the October Revolution the Russian SFSR ceded the entire Kars Oblast including the Kars okrug through the Treaty of Brest-Litovsk to the Ottoman Empire, who had been unreconciled with its loss of the territory since 1878. Despite the ineffectual resistance of the Transcaucasian Democratic Federative Republic which had initially rejected the aforementioned treaty, the Ottoman Third Army was successful in occupying the Kars Oblast and expelling its 100,000 panic-stricken Armenian inhabitants.

The Ottoman Ninth Army under the command of Yakub Shevki Pasha, the occupying force of the district by the time of the Mudros Armistice, were permitted to winter in Kars until early 1919, after which on 7 January 1919 Major General G.T. Forestier-Walker ordered their complete withdrawal to the pre-1914 Ottoman-frontier. Intended to hinder the westward expansion of the fledgling Armenian and Georgian republics into the Kars Oblast, Yukub Shevki backed the emergence of the short-lived South-West Caucasus Republic with moral support, also furnishing it with weapons, ammunition and instructors.

The South-West Caucasus Republic administered the Kars okrug and neighboring formerly occupied districts for three months before provoking British intervention by order of General G.F. Milne, leading to its capitulation by Armenian and British forces on 10 April 1919. Consequently, the Kars Oblast largely came under the Armenian civil governorship of Stepan Korganian who wasted no time in facilitating the repatriation of the region's exiled refugees.

Despite the apparent defeat of the Ottoman Empire, Turkish agitators were reported by Armenian intelligence to have been freely roaming the countryside of Kars encouraging sedition among the Muslim villages, culminating in a series of anti-Armenian uprisings on 1 July 1919.

The Kars Oblast for the third time in six years saw invading Turkish troops, this time under the command of General Kâzım Karabekir in September 1920 during the Turkish-Armenian War. The disastrous war for Armenia resulted in the permanent expulsion of the region's ethnic Armenian population, many who inexorably remained befalling massacre, resulting in the region joining the Republic of Turkey through the Treaty of Alexandropol on 3 December 1920. Turkey's annexation of Kars and the adjacent Surmalu Uyezd was confirmed in the treaties of Kars and Moscow in 1921, by virtue of the new Soviet regime in Armenia. Again according to them, most of Aghbaba uchastok went to Soviet Armenia, remainder of it went to Turkey.

== Administrative divisions ==
The prefectures (участки, uchastki) of the Kars okrug were:

Name	Administrative centre	1912 population	Area
Agbabinskiy prefecture (Агбабинский участок)	Amasiya (Amasia)	14,309	570.96 square versts (649.79 km^{2}; 250.88 mi^{2})
Zarushadskiy prefecture (Зарушадский участок)	Grenaderskoye (Arpaçay)	19,416	1,104.11 square versts (1,256.55 km^{2}; 485.16 mi^{2})
Karsskiy prefecture (Карсский участок)	Kars	29,574	1,352.94 square versts (1,539.73 km^{2}; 594.49 mi^{2})
Soganlugskiy prefecture (Соганлугский участок)	Nizhniy Sarykamysh (Sarıkamış)	23,821	1,044.04 square versts (1,188.18 km^{2}; 458.76 mi^{2})
Shuragelskiy prefecture (Шурагельский участок)	Kizil-Chakhchakh (Akyaka)	39,369	1,011.76 square versts (1,151.45 km^{2}; 444.58 mi^{2})

== Demographics ==
=== Russian Empire Census ===
According to the Russian Empire Census, the Kars okrug had a population of 134,142 on 28 January [O.S. 15 January] 1897, including 75,452 men and 58,690 women. The plurality of the population indicated Armenian to be their mother tongue, with significant Karapapakh, Russian, Greek, Turkish, and Kurdish speaking minorities.

Linguistic composition of the Kars okrug in 1897
Language	Native speakers	%
Armenian	46,715	34.83
Karapapakh	22,002	16.40
Russian	16,874	12.58
Greek	14,805	11.04
Turkish	10,609	7.91
Kurdish	9,165	6.83
Ukrainian	3,297	2.46
Turkmen	2,456	1.83
Polish	2,093	1.56
Tatar (Note: Before 1918, Azerbaijanis were generally known as "Tatars". This term, employed by the Russians, referred to Turkic-speaking Muslims of the South Caucasus. After 1918, with the establishment of the Azerbaijan Democratic Republic and "especially during the Soviet era", the Tatar group identified itself as "Azerbaijani".)	1,439	1.07
Jewish	755	0.56
Lithuanian	611	0.46
Assyrian	585	0.44
Estonian	424	0.32
Ossetian	401	0.30
Persian	317	0.24
Georgian	308	0.23
German	294	0.22
Avar-Andean	276	0.21
Bashkir	206	0.15
Belarusian	205	0.15
Dargin	95	0.07
Other	210	0.16
TOTAL	134,142	100.00

=== Kavkazskiy kalendar ===
According to the 1917 publication of Kavkazskiy kalendar, the Kars okrug had a population of 191,970 on 14 January [O.S. 1 January] 1916, including 97,919 men and 94,051 women, 153,102 of whom were the permanent population, and 38,868 were temporary residents. The statistics indicated an overwhelmingly Armenian population in the city of Kars, with sizeable Asiatic Christian, Russian, and Sunni Muslim minorities, however, in the rest of the okrug, Armenians formed the plurality of the population, being closely followed by Sunni Muslim, Roma, Shia Muslim, Russian, Kurdish and Yazidi minorities:

Nationality	Urban		Rural		TOTAL	
Nationality	Number	%	Number	%	Number	%
Armenians	25,665	84.11	55,087	34.12	80,752	42.06
Sunni Muslims (Note: Primarily Turco-Tatars.)	1,210	3.97	31,355	19.42	32,565	16.96
Roma	0	0.00	23,504	14.56	23,504	12.24
Shia Muslims (Note: Primarily Tatars.)	260	0.85	17,965	11.13	18,225	9.49
Russians	1,487	4.87	14,493	8.98	15,980	8.32
Kurds	38	0.12	10,873	6.73	10,911	5.68
Yazidis	0	0.00	5,123	3.17	5,123	2.67
Asiatic Christians	1,779	5.83	1,350	0.84	3,129	1.63
North Caucasians	0	0.00	869	0.54	869	0.45
Other Europeans	49	0.16	733	0.45	782	0.41
Georgians	1	0.00	104	0.06	105	0.05
Jews	25	0.08	0	0.00	25	0.01
TOTAL	30,514	100.00	161,456	100.00	191,970	100.00

== Bibliography ==
- Bournoutian, George A. (2018). Armenia and Imperial Decline: The Yerevan Province, 1900–1914. Milton Park, Abingdon, Oxon: Routledge. ISBN 978-1-351-06260-2. OCLC 1037283914.
- Hovannisian, Richard G. (1971). The Republic of Armenia. Vol. 1: The First Year, 1918–1919. Berkeley: University of California Press. ISBN 978-0520019843.
- Кавказский календарь на 1913 год [Caucasian calendar for 1913] (in Russian) (68th ed.). Tiflis: Tipografiya kantselyarii Ye.I.V. na Kavkaze, kazenny dom. 1913. Archived from the original on 19 April 2022.
- Кавказский календарь на 1917 год [Caucasian calendar for 1917] (in Russian) (72nd ed.). Tiflis: Tipografiya kantselyarii Ye.I.V. na Kavkaze, kazenny dom. 1917. Archived from the original on 4 November 2021.
- Tsutsiev, Arthur (2014). Atlas of the Ethno-Political History of the Caucasus (PDF). Translated by Nora Seligman Favorov. New Haven: Yale University Press. ISBN 9780300153088. Archived (PDF) from the original on 17 June 2023.
