= Kars oblast =

Kars oblast Карсская область
- Oblast
- Coat of arms

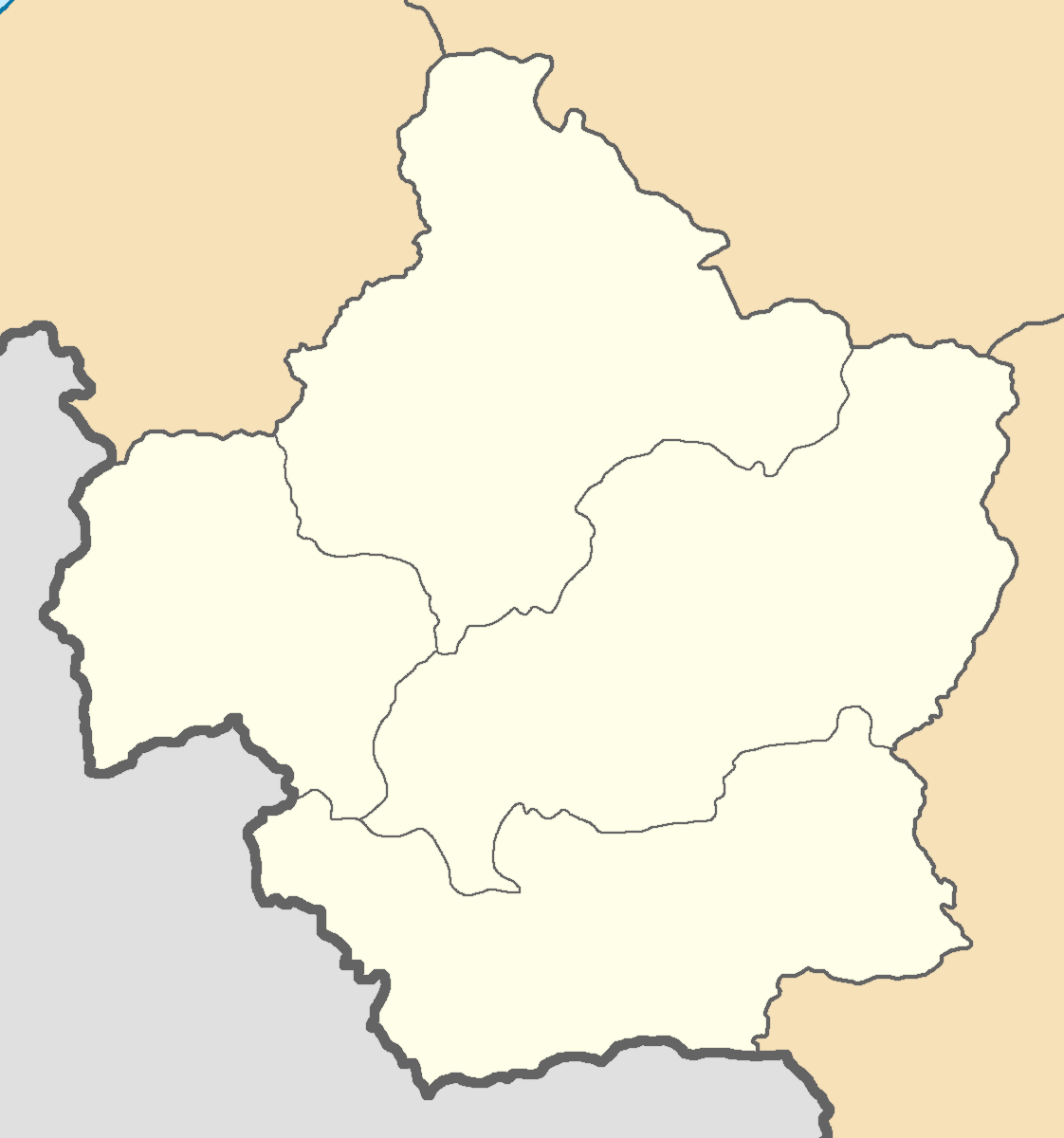
- Administrative map of the Kars oblast
- Coordinates: 40.6069°N 43.0931°E
- Country: Russian Empire
- Viceroyalty: Caucasus
- Established: 1878
- Treaty of Brest-Litovsk: 3 March 1918
- Capital: Kars

Area
  - Total: 18,739.50 km^{2} (7,235.36 sq mi)

Population (1916)
  - Total: 364,214
  - Density: 19.4356/km^{2} (50.3381/sq mi)
  - Urban: 12.30%
  - Rural: 87.70%

The Kars oblast (Note: Russian: Карсская область, romanized: Karsskaya oblast [ˈkarskəjə ˈobɫəsʲtʲ]; Turkish: Kars Oblastı [kaɾs obɫastɯ]; Armenian: Կարսի մարզ, romanized: Karsi marz [kɑɹˈsi mɑɹz] (Note: Western Armenian pronunciation: [ɡɑɹˈsi mɑɹz])) was a province (oblast) of the Caucasus Viceroyalty of the Russian Empire between 1878 and 1917. Its capital was the city of Kars, which later became part of Turkey. The oblast bordered the Ottoman Empire to the west, the Batum Oblast (in 1883–1903 part of the Kutaisi Governorate) to the north, the Tiflis Governorate to the northeast, and the Erivan Governorate to the east. The Kars oblast included parts of the contemporary provinces of Kars, Ardahan, and Erzurum Province of Turkey, and the Amasia Community of the Shirak Province of Armenia.

== History ==
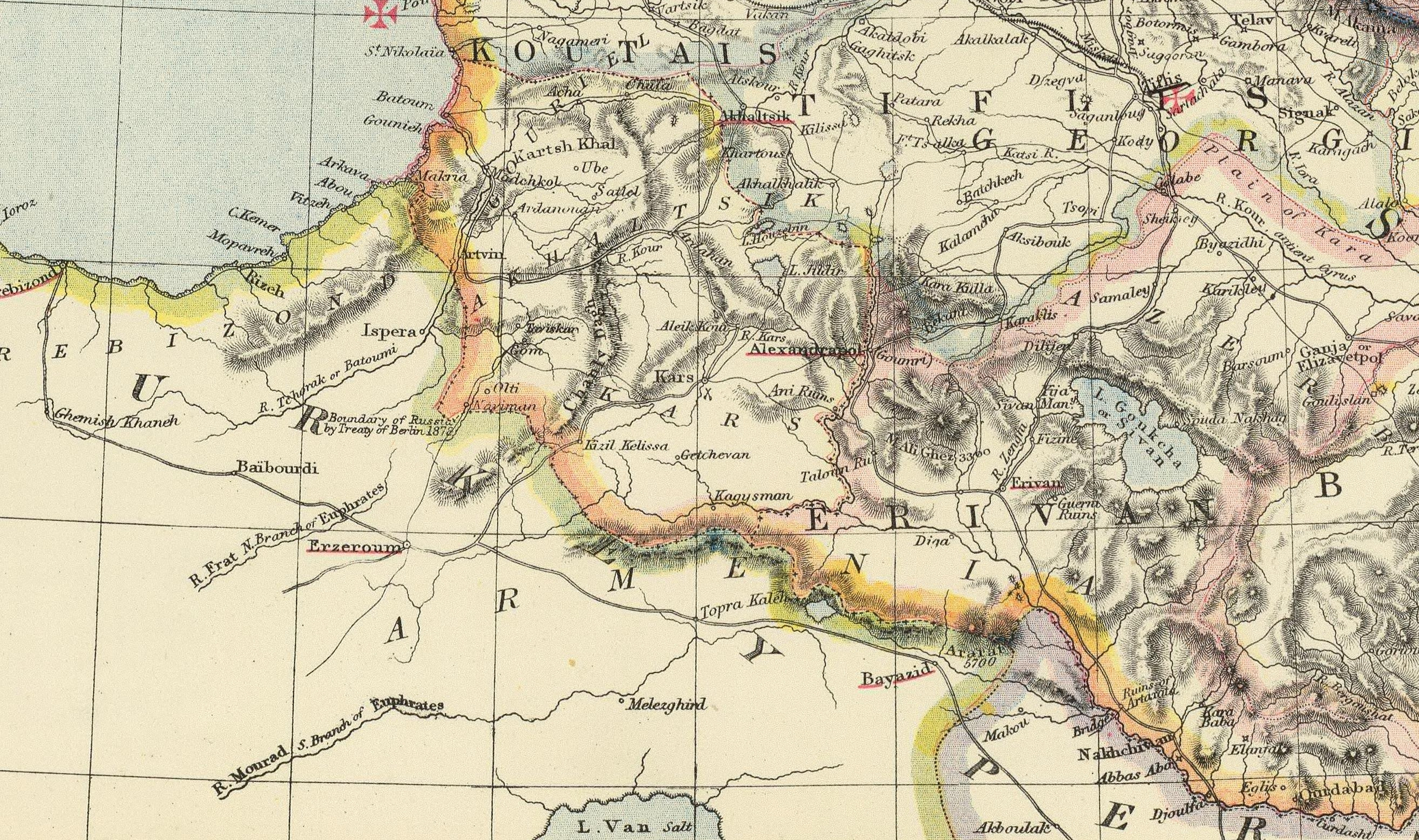
An 1883 map including the Kars oblast and adjacent provinces of Russian and Ottoman empires

The Kars oblast was a province established after the region's annexation into the Russian Empire through the Treaty of San Stefano in 1878, following the defeat of the Ottoman Empire and the dissolution of the latter's Kars, Childir and Erzurum States.

With the incorporation of the region into Russian Empire, between 1879–1882 more than 110,000 people from the Kars oblast and 30,000 from the Batum oblast migrated to the new borders of the Ottoman Empire, about 80% were Muslim. In their stead, Christian settlers, mostly consisting of Armenians, Greeks and Russians, migrated from the Ottoman Empire and settled throughout the province. The Armenians, who eventually came to form the largest ethnic group in the region, were largely composed of immigrants from the Six Vilayets escaping persecution in the Ottoman Empire.

During the First World War, the Kars oblast became the site of intense battles between the Russian Caucasus Army supplemented by Armenian volunteer units and the Ottoman Third Army, the latter of whom was successful in briefly occupying Ardahan on 25 December 1914 before they were dislodged in early January 1915.

On 3 March 1918, in the aftermath of the October Revolution the Russian SFSR ceded the entire Kars oblast through the Treaty of Brest-Litovsk to the Ottoman Empire, who had been unreconciled with its loss of the territory since 1878. Despite the ineffectual resistance of the Transcaucasian Democratic Federative Republic which had initially rejected the aforementioned treaty, the Ottoman Third Army was successful in occupying the Kars oblast and expelling its more than 100,000 Armenian inhabitants.

The Ottoman Ninth Army under the command of Yakub Shevki Pasha, the occupying force of the district by the time of the Mudros Armistice, were permitted to winter in Kars until early 1919, after which on 7 January 1919 Major General G.T. Forestier-Walker ordered their complete withdrawal to the pre-1914 Ottoman-frontier. Intended to hinder the westward expansion of the fledgling Armenian and Georgian republics into the Kars oblast, Yukub Shevki backed the emergence of the short-lived South-West Caucasus Republic with moral support, also furnishing it with weapons, ammunition and instructors.

The South-West Caucasus Republic administered the entire Kars oblast and neighboring formerly occupied districts for three months before provoking British intervention by order of General G.F. Milne, leading to its capitulation by Armenian and British forces on 10 April 1919. Consequently, the Kars oblast largely came under the Armenian civil governorship of Stepan Korganian who wasted no time in facilitating the repatriation of the region's exiled refugees.

Despite the apparent defeat of the Ottoman Empire, Turkish agitators were reported by Armenian intelligence to have been freely roaming the countryside of Kars encouraging sedition among the Muslim villages, culminating in a series of anti-Armenian uprisings in July 1919.

The Kars oblast for the third time in six years saw invading Turkish troops, this time under the command of General Kâzım Karabekir in September 1920 during the Turkish-Armenian War. The disastrous war for Armenia resulted in the permanent expulsion of the region's ethnic Armenian population, many who inexorably remained befalling massacre, resulting in the region joining the Republic of Turkey through the Treaty of Alexandropol on 3 December 1920. Turkey's annexation of Kars and the adjacent Surmalu uezd was confirmed in the treaties of Kars and Moscow in 1921, by virtue of the new Soviet regime in Armenia.

After Turkey's annexation of the region, Soviet diplomat Georgy Chicherin sent a letter to the Turkish ambassador to the RSFSR, Ali Fuat Cebesoy, complaining of the violence and expulsion against Russians in Kars by Turkish authorities. For example, in the village of Novo-Mikhailovka (present-day Dikme), the Russian population was placed into "stables and barns" and replaced by 2,000 Turkish settlers from Anatolia.

== Administrative divisions ==
The districts (okrugs) of the Kars oblast in 1917 were as follows:

Name	Administrative centre			Population		Area
Name		1897	1916	1897	1916	Area
Ardahan okrug (Ардаганский округ)	Ardagan (Ardahan)	4,142	3,167	65,763	89,036	4,917.90 square versts (5,596.88 km^{2}; 2,160.97 mi^{2})
Kagizman okrug (Кагызманский округ)	Kagyzman (Kağızman)	10,518	11,145	59,230	83,208	3,843.17 square versts (4,373.77 km^{2}; 1,688.72 mi^{2})
Kars okrug (Карсский округ)	Kars	20,805	30,514	134,142	191,970	5,083.81 square versts (5,785.69 km^{2}; 2,233.87 mi^{2})
Olti okrug (Ольтинский округ)	Olty (Oltu)	2,373	3,258	31,519	40,091 (Note: 1914 population.)	2,621.27 square versts (2,983.17 km^{2}; 1,151.81 mi^{2})

== Demographics ==
=== Population estimate ===
==== 1886 ====
Census population and average annual growth rate
Year	Pop.	±% p.a.
1871	67,128	—
1872	69,996	+4.27%
1876	78,650	+2.96%
1880	114,282	+9.79%
1882	162,979	+19.42%
1886	174,044	+1.66%
1892	200,868	+2.42%
1893	206,765	+2.94%
1897	290,654	+8.89%
1899	273,124	−3.06%
1902	297,125	+2.85%
1903	304,193	+2.38%
1908	310,155	+0.39%
1910	368,057	+8.94%
1912	371,903	+0.52%
1913	382,745	+2.92%
1914	391,213	+2.21%
1915	255,461	−34.70%
1916	364,214	+42.57%
For 1897, see The first general census of the population of the Russian Empire in 1897. For 1903–1916, see Caucasian Calendar publications for years 1904–1917.

Ethnic composition of the Kars oblast in 1886
Ethnic group	Ardаhan		Kagizman		Kars		Olti		TOTAL	
Ethnic group	Number	%	Number	%	Number	%	Number	%	Number	%
Turkish	20,351	46.63	2,652	7.76	7,280	9.46	11,540	59.71	41,823	24.03
Armenian	262	0.60	12,544	36.72	22,544	29.31	1,734	8.97	37,084	21.31
Kurd	6,974	15.98	12,003	35.14	5,124	6.66	2,333	12.07	26,434	15.19
Karapapakh	6,229	14.27	593	1.74	17,308	22.50	4	0.02	24,134	13.87
Greek	5,617	12.87	4,880	14.29	11,002	14.30	2,026	10.48	23,525	13.52
Russian	1,036	2.37	0	0.00	9,657	12.56	1	0.06	10,695	6.14
Turkmen	3,128	7.17	1,426	4.17	2,749	3.57	1,591	8.23	8,893	5.11
Ossetian	0	0.00	0	0.00	418	0.54	12	0.06	430	0.25
Assyrian	0	0.00	0	0.00	321	0.42	0	0.00	321	0.18
Estonian	0	0.00	0	0.00	280	0.36	0	0.00	280	0.16
Lezgin	0	0.00	41	0.12	155	0.20	0	0.00	196	0.11
Persian	9	0.02	9	0.03	60	0.08	3	0.02	81	0.05
Roma	0	0.00	0	0.00	9	0.01	69	0.36	78	0.05
Adjarian	21	0.05	0	0.00	0	0.00	0	0.00	21	0.01
Abkhazian	0	0.00	0	0.00	0	0.00	12	0.06	12	0.01
Georgian	9	0.02	0	0.00	0	0.00	0	0.00	9	0.01
Polish	0	0.00	0	0.00	7	0.01	0	0.00	7	0.00
Bulgarian	1	0.00	0	0.00	3	0.01	1	0.01	5	0.00
Circassian	5	0.01	0	0.00	0	0.00	0	0.00	5	0.00
Kabardian	1	0.00	0	0.00	0	0.00	0	0.00	1	0.00
Other	0	0.00	10	0.03	0	0.00	0	0.00	10	0.01
TOTAL	43,643	100.00	34,158	100.00	76,917	100.00	19,326	100.00	174,044	100.00

==== 1892 ====
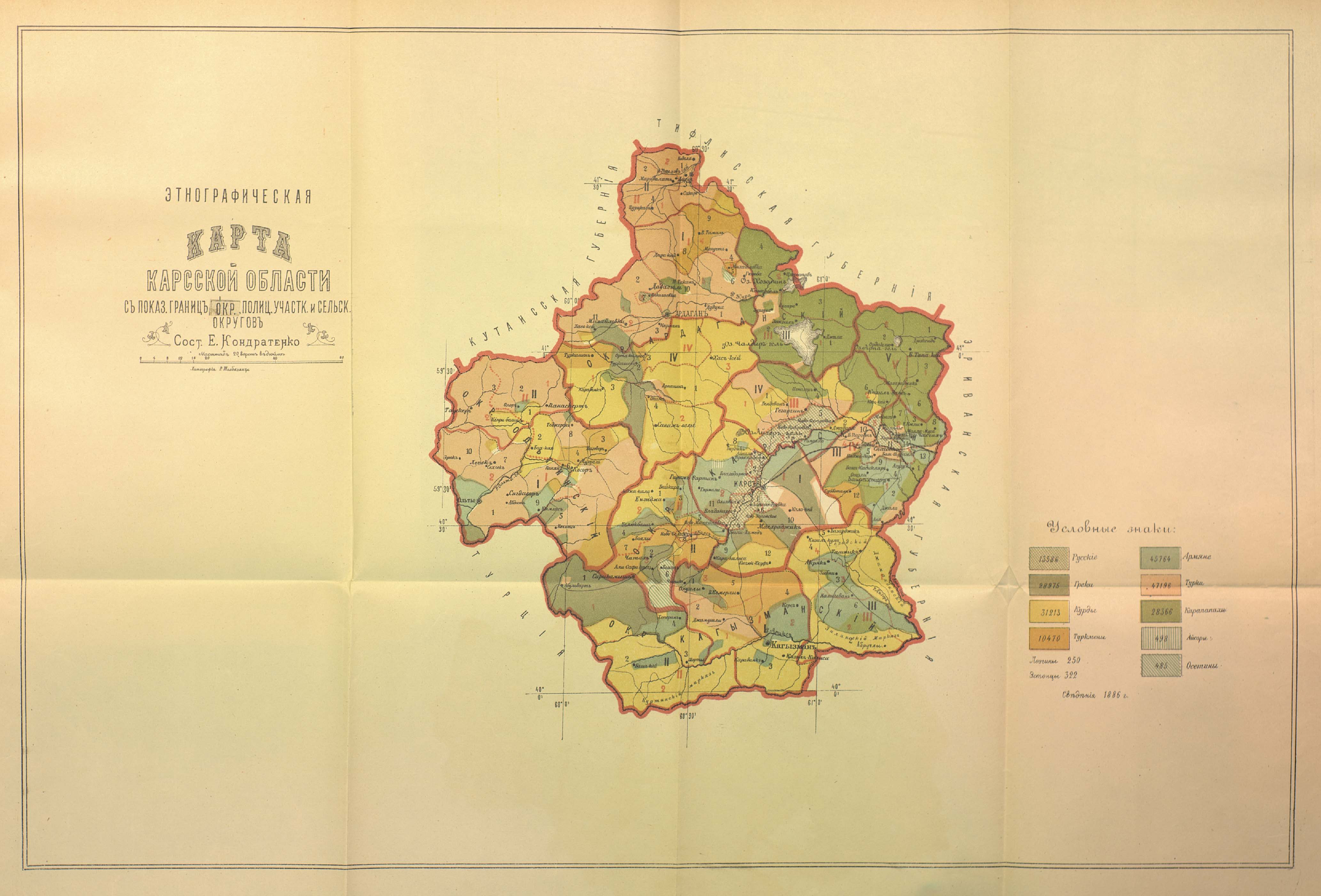
Ethnographic map of the Kars oblast, 1902 (according to the census of 1886)

In 1892, the population of Kars oblast was estimated as 200,868. The ethnic composition was reported as follows:

Ethnic composition of the Kars oblast in 1892
Ethnic group	Number	%
Turk (Note: Including Adjarians.)	48,208	24
Armenian	43,187	21.5
Kurd	30,130	15
Karapapakh	29,126	14
Greek	27,117	13.5
Russian (Note: Mostly sectarians.)	14,061	7
Alevi Karapapakh (Note: Reported as "Turkmen".)	10,043	5

Religious composition of the Kars oblast in 1892
Faith	Percentage (%)
Islam	53
↳ Sunni	46
↳ Shia	7
Armenian Apostolic	21
Eastern Orthodoxy	14
Alevism	5
Spiritual Christianity (Note: Mostly Pryguny, Molokans, and Doukhobors.)	5
Yazidism	1.25
Other Christian churches	0.75

=== Russian Empire Census ===
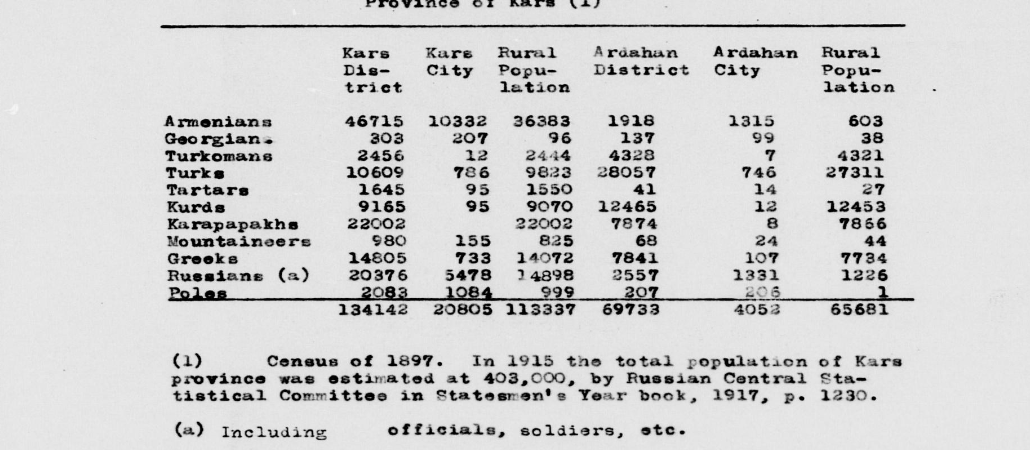
Kars 1897 Census

According to the Russian Empire Census, the Kars oblast had a population of 290,654 on 28 January [O.S. 16 January] 1897, including 160,571 men and 130,083 women. This number may imply that the 200,868 estimate for 1892 given by Brockhaus is too low, or that a large-scale migration from other provinces of the empire took place in between:

Linguistic composition of the Kars oblast in 1897
Language	Native speakers	%
Armenian	73,406	25.26
Turkish	63,547	21.86
Kurdish	42,968	14.78
Greek	32,593	11.21
Karapapakh	29,879	10.28
Russian	22,327	7.68
Turkmen	8,442	2.90
Ukrainian	5,279	1.82
Polish	3,243	1.12
Tatar (Note: Before 1918, Azerbaijanis were generally known as "Tatars". This term, employed by the Russians, referred to Turkic-speaking Muslims of the South Caucasus. After 1918, with the establishment of the Azerbaijan Democratic Republic and "especially during the Soviet era", the Tatar group identified itself as "Azerbaijani".)	2,347	0.81
Jewish	1,138	0.39
Lithuanian	892	0.31
Assyrian	585	0.20
Persian	568	0.20
Georgian	526	0.18
Ossetian	520	0.18
Estonian	455	0.16
German	430	0.15
Avar-Andean	328	0.11
Belarusian	250	0.09
Bashkir	207	0.07
Dargin	120	0.04
Other	604	0.21
TOTAL	290,654	100.00

The 30,000 excess population of male over females was mainly attributed to the European language speakers. Among the 27,856 speakers of Russian, Ukrainian, and Belarusian, 19,910 men and 7,946 women were recorded. The Polish, and Lithuanian speakers were almost exclusively (99%) male as well; Germans and Jews, 80–90% males. This preponderance of males in the European language speakers (reported to a lesser extent in neighbouring governorates as well) may indicate presence of a large numbers of soldiers or exiled persons in the region. This assumption supported by the fact that 28,875 or 9.9% of the population were military or administrative personnel.

Faiths in the Kars oblast in 1897
1. Muslim (50.2%)
2. Armenian Apostolic (24.5%)
3. Eastern Orthodox (17.0%)
4. Old Believer (4.27%)
5. Roman Catholic (1.50%)
6. Armenian Catholic (0.63%)
7. Other (1.99%)

Religious composition of the Kars oblast in 1897
Faith	Male	Female	Both	
Faith	Male	Female	Number	%
Muslim	76,521	69,331	145,852	50.18
Armenian Apostolic	37,726	33,397	71,123	24.47
Eastern Orthodox	31,115	18,180	49,295	16.96
Old Believer	6,069	6,351	12,420	4.27
Roman Catholic	4,286	87	4,373	1.50
Armenian Catholic	1,065	779	1,844	0.63
Judaism	1,114	90	1,204	0.41
Lutheran	854	323	1,177	0.40
Reformed	15	8	23	0.01
Baptist	7	1	8	0.00
Other Christian denomination	9	0	9	0.00
Other non-Christian denomination	1,790	1,536	3,326	1.14
TOTAL	160,571	130,083	290,654	100.00

=== Kavkazskiy kalendar ===
Nationalities in the Kars oblast in 1916
1. Armenians (32.5%)
2. Sunni Muslims (22.9%)
3. Kurds (13.7%)
4. Roma (10.5%)
5. Shia Muslims (5.34%)
6. Russians (5.22%)
7. Yazidis (4.86%)
8. Asiatic Christians (4.61%)
9. Others (0.51%)

According to the 1917 publication of Kavkazskiy kalendar, the Kars oblast had a population of 364,214 on 14 January [O.S. 1 January] 1916, including 185,895 men and 178,319 women, 308,400 of whom were the permanent population, and 55,814 were temporary residents:

Nationality	Urban		Rural		TOTAL (Note: These statistics do not include the population of the Olti Okrug due to the absence of its data in the 1916–7 publications of Kavkazskiy kalendar.)	
Nationality	Number	%	Number	%	Number	%
Armenians	36,268	80.96	81,949	25.66	118,217	32.46
Sunni Muslims (Note: Primarily Turco-Tatars.)	4,055	9.05	79,249	24.81	83,304	22.87
Kurds	66	0.15	49,686	15.56	49,752	13.66
Roma	361	0.81	37,784	11.83	38,145	10.47
Shia Muslims (Note: Primarily Tatars.)	322	0.72	19,122	5.99	19,444	5.34
Russians	1,800	4.02	17,197	5.38	18,997	5.22
Yazidis	0	0.00	17,698	5.54	17,698	4.86
Asiatic Christian	1,822	4.07	14,965	4.69	16,787	4.61
North Caucasians	0	0.00	909	0.28	909	0.28
Other Europeans	55	0.12	741	0.23	796	0.22
Georgians	19	0.04	117	0.04	136	0.04
Jews	29	0.06	0	0.00	29	0.01
TOTAL	44,797	100.00	319,417	100.00	364,214	100.00

== See also ==
- Batum oblast
- Russian Armenia
- First Republic of Armenia
- Democratic Republic of Georgia
- Treaty of San Stefano
- Treaty of Berlin (1878)

== Bibliography ==
- Bournoutian, George A. (2018). Armenia and Imperial Decline: The Yerevan Province, 1900–1914. Milton Park, Abingdon, Oxon: Routledge. ISBN 978-1-351-06260-2. OCLC 1037283914.
- Frary, Lucien J.; Kozelsky, Mara, eds. (12 August 2014). Russian-Ottoman Borderlands: The Eastern Question Reconsidered. Madison, Wisconsin: University of Wisconsin Press. ISBN 978-0-299-29803-6. OCLC 893910208.
- Hovannisian, Richard G. (1971). The Republic of Armenia. Vol. 1: The First Year, 1918–1919. Berkeley: University of California Press. ISBN 978-0520019843.
- Кавказский календарь на 1917 год [Caucasian calendar for 1917] (in Russian) (72nd ed.). Tiflis: Tipografiya kantselyarii Ye.I.V. na Kavkaze, kazenny dom. 1917. Archived from the original on 4 November 2021.
- Tsutsiev, Arthur (2014). Atlas of the Ethno-Political History of the Caucasus (PDF). Translated by Nora Seligman Favorov. New Haven: Yale University Press. ISBN 9780300153088. Archived (PDF) from the original on 17 June 2023.
