= Akna =

Akna may refer to:

- AKNA, a protein and human gene name
- Akna (Inuit mythology), goddess of fertility and childbirth in Inuit mythology
- Akna (Maya mythology), goddess of motherhood and birthing in Maya mythology
- Akna, Azerbaijan, Armenian name for the city of Ağdam
- Lake Akna (Kotayk), a lake in the Geghama mountains, Armenia
- Lake Akna (Armavir), a lake in the Ararat plain, Armenia
