= Lake Akna =

Lake Akna may refer to:

- Lake Akna (Kotayk), a lake in the Geghama mountains, Armenia
- Lake Akna (Armavir), a lake in the Ararat plain, Armenia
