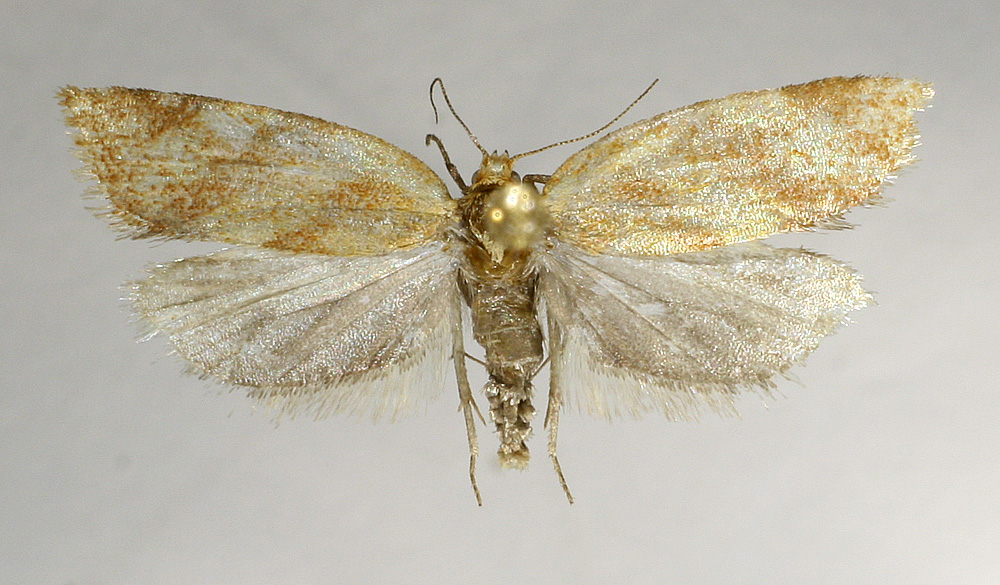

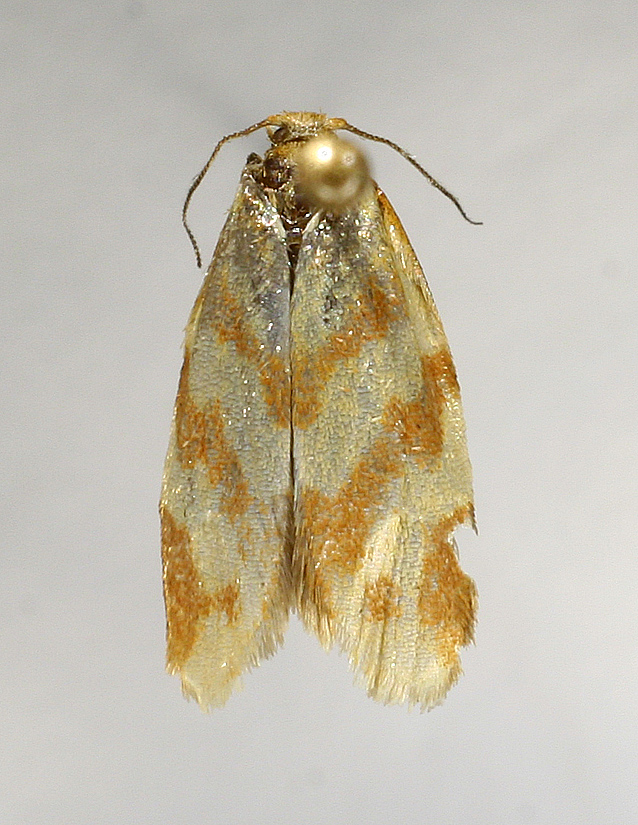

Scientific classification
- Kingdom: Animalia
- Phylum: Arthropoda
- Clade: Pancrustacea
- Class: Insecta
- Order: Lepidoptera
- Family: Tortricidae
- Genus: Clepsis
- Species: C. pallidana

Binomial name
- Clepsis pallidana (Fabricius, 1776)

Synonyms
- Pyralis pallidana Fabricius, 1776; Cacoecia caesareana Rebel, in Staudinger & Wocke, 1901; Tortrix cesareana de Joannis, 1891; Tortrix districta Meyrick, 1920; Tortrix quinquemaculana Bremer, 1865; Tortrix stramineana Herrich-Schäffer, 1847; Tortrix (Lozotaenia) stramineana Herrich-Schäffer, 1851; Tortrix strigana Hubner, [1796-1799]

= Clepsis pallidana =

Species of moth

Clepsis pallidana is a moth of the family Tortricidae. It is found in most of Europe, as well as Asia Minor, Iran, Russia (Primorsk and Tuva), Mongolia, China, the Korean Peninsula and Japan.

The wingspan is 15–20 mm. Adults are on wing from June to July in western Europe.

The larvae feed on a wide range of plants, including of Artemisia campestris, Gnaphalium, Euphorbia, Spiraea ulmaria, Lactuca scariola, Aster, Urtica, Iris, Jurinea, Solidago, Sedum and Malus.
