= Natalia Martirosyan =

Armenian engineer (1889–1960)

- Նատալյա Մարտիրոսյան
- Born: Natalia Artemi Martirosyan; 14 October [O.S. 2 October] 1889; Tiflis, Russian Empire (now Tbilisi, Georgia)
- Died: 14 June 1960 (aged 70); Yerevan, Armenian SSR, Soviet Union
- Education: St. Petersburg Polytechnic Institute
- Engineering career
- Institutions: Armenian State Water Project
- Projects: Hoktemberyan Canal; Lake Arpi; Shirak Canal
- Awards: Honored Artist of the Armenian SSR; Order of Lenin; Order of the Red Banner of Labour

Natalia Artemi Martirosyan (Armenian: Նատալյա Արտեմի Մարտիրոսյան; 14 October [O.S. 2 October] 1889 – 14 June 1960) was an Armenian irrigation engineer. She led the design of several noteworthy irrigation projects throughout her career, including the Shirak Canal, the Hoktemberyan Canal, and Lake Arpi.

== Biography ==
Natalia Artemi Martirosyan was born on 14 October [O.S. 2 October] 1889 in Tbilisi, then part of Georgia in the Russian Empire. She graduated from the St. Petersburg Polytechnic Institute in 1915 and trained as an irrigation engineer. She was elected to the Central Executive Committee of the Transcaucasian Socialist Federative Soviet Republic in 1931 and 1935.

Martirosyan participated in the design and construction of the Shirak Canal from 1922 until 1925. In 1925, she became the head of the People's Commissariat for Water Management of the Armenian SSR, and she later worked at the Armenian State Water Project from 1940 until 1960. In these roles, she designed the Hoktemberyan Canal, the Lake Akna pumping station and irrigation network, the Lake Arpi reservoir, and several other projects. For her work, Martirosyan was awarded the Order of Lenin and the Order of the Red Banner of Labour, and was named an Honored Artist of the Armenian SSR in 1957.

Martirosyan died in Yerevan on 14 June 1960.
