= Azhdahak (volcano) =

Volcano in Armenia

Mount Azhdahak
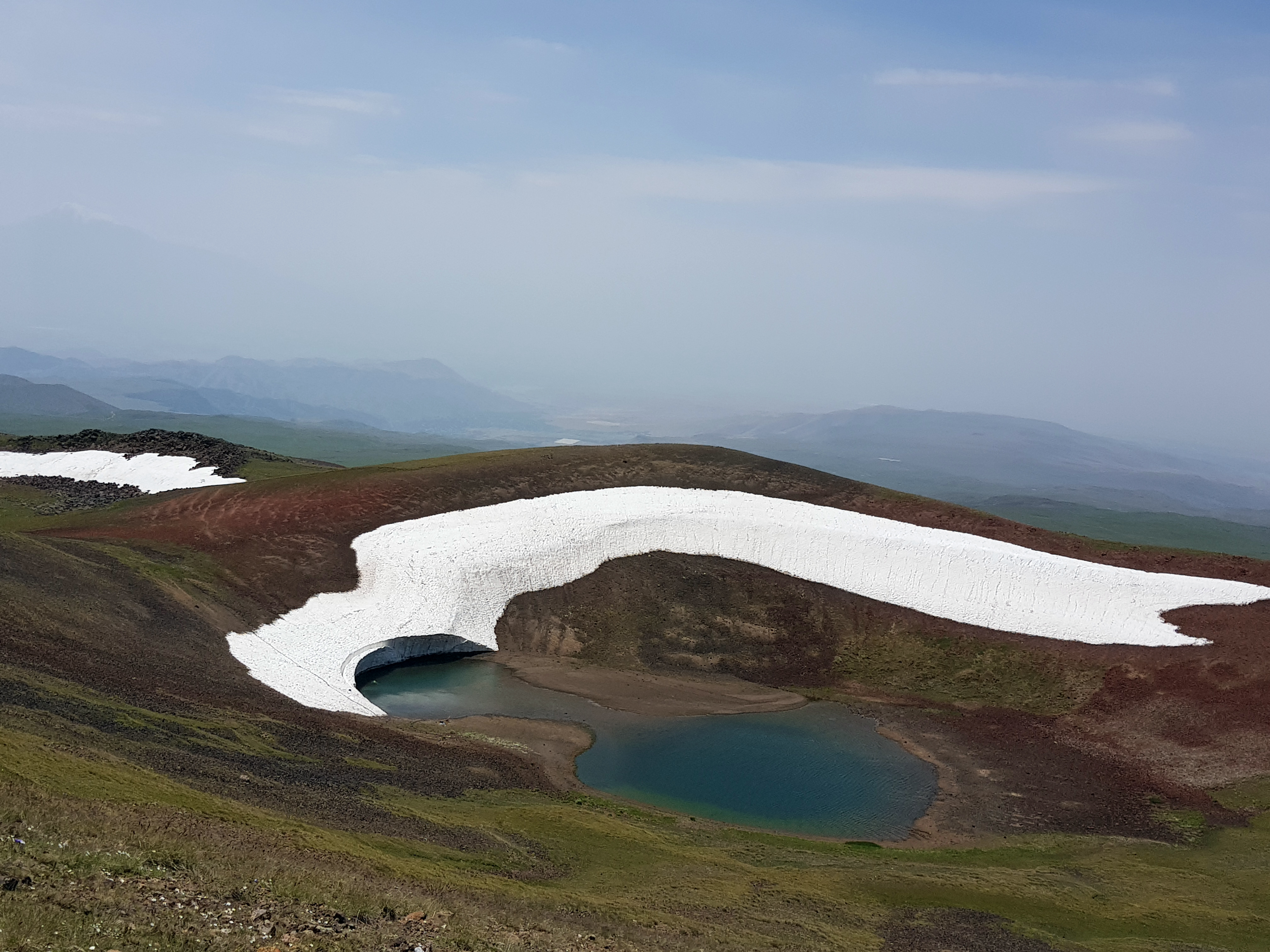
- Mount Azhdahak

Highest point
- Elevation: 3,597 m (11,801 ft)
- Prominence: 1,268 m (4,160 ft)
- Listing: Ribu
- Coordinates: 40°13′33″N 44°56′50″E

Geography
- Location within Armenia Location within Gegharkunik
- Location: Gegharkunik Province, Armenia
- Parent range: Lesser Caucasus

Azhdahak (Armenian: Աժդահակ) is a volcano in Armenia, the highest point of Gegham mountains. It has an elevation of 3,597 m above sea. It is part of the Gegham Ridge volcanic field, which last erupted at 1900 BC ± 1000 years.

There is a lake in the crater of volcano Azhdahak that is formed from melting snow. From the top of the mountain opens the pictorial landscape of mountains Ararat, Hatis, Ara, Aragats, Lake Sevan, the whole Gegham mountains and the Kotayk valley.

In the surroundings of Azhdahak there is a lake, Akna (Armenian: Ակնալիճ Aknalich), of volcanic origin. “Akn” means "spring (water)" in Armenian.

== Geology ==
The compound scoria cone of Azhdahak is up to 1600m in diameter and about 370m high. The total area of volcanic lavas, partly eroded and overlapped by the streams of tar, is around 8 square km. The cone is formed of scoria, lapilli, sands, volcanic ash, debris, lava boulders, and volcanic bombs.

== Fauna and flora ==
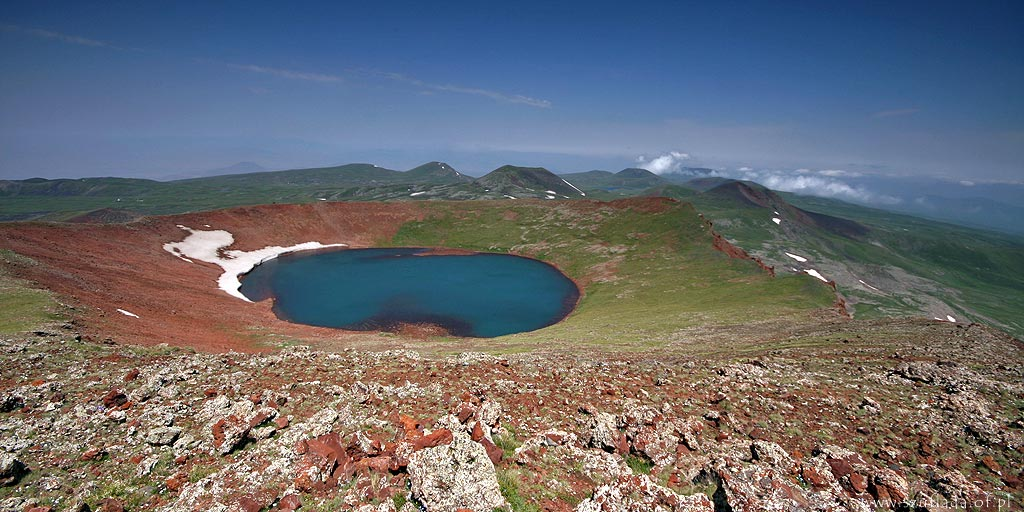

Bird fauna of Gegham Mountain Range includes about 250 species, what makes up 70% of all Armenia's avifauna. Stony slopes are an irreplaceable habitat for birds of prey, such as:

- Golden eagle (Aquila chrysaetos)
- Egyptian vulture (Neophron percnopterus)
- Cinereous vulture (Aegypius monachus)
- Imperial eagle (Aquila heliaca)
- Griffon vulture (Gyps fulvus)
- Bearded vulture (Gypaetus barbatus)

On the snow-covered slopes, traces of brown bear (Ursus arctos) are often found.

The following plants are typically found in the Gegham Mountains area and surroundings of Azhdahak:

- Jurinea moschus
- Arabis caucasica
- Catsfoot diclinous (Antennaria dioica),
- Gentiana pontica
- Red everlasting (Helichrysum pallasii),
- Lady's-mantle (Alchemilla grossheimii),
- Alpine cinquefoil (Potentilla crantzi),
- Sibbaldia (Sibbaldia parviflora),
- Merendera Radde (Colchicum raddeanum),
- Oxytrope Lazica (Oxytropis lazica),
- Vavilovia Oshe (Lathyrus formosus)

== Rock carvings ==
A great number of petroglyphs – carvings have been found in the surroundings of Azhdahak. Most images depict men in scenes of hunting and fighting, as well as astronomical bodies and phenomena: the Sun, the Moon, constellations, the stellar sky, lightning, etc.

== Settlements near Azhdahak ==
In Gegham mountains are engaged the cattle breeding people called Yazidi – one of national minorities of Armenia, who move to the mountains for the summer and live in tents with families and even with infants. The Yazidis are an ethno-confessional group, whose main identity is religion; Yazidism or Sharfadin. Nomadic stockbreeding is their major occupation. The Yazidi society is a caste system including three main components: the Shaykhs, the Pirs (clergy) and murids (laymen).

== Tourism and hiking ==
The beauty of the Azhdahak surroundings have long attracted tourists. However, the probability of running across each other different hiking groups is insignificant. It depends on the remoteness from the civilization, orientation complexities, that aggravate with weather condition factors, such as: thunder and lightning, hail and snow, fog with visibility down to 2-3m.
