= Azhdahak =

Azhdahak may refer to:

- Astyages, the last Median Emperor and a brute figure in Kurdish and West Asian folklore.
- Azhdahak (mythology), an Armenian mythological being known as a man-dragon
- Azhdahak (volcano), a volcano in Armenia
