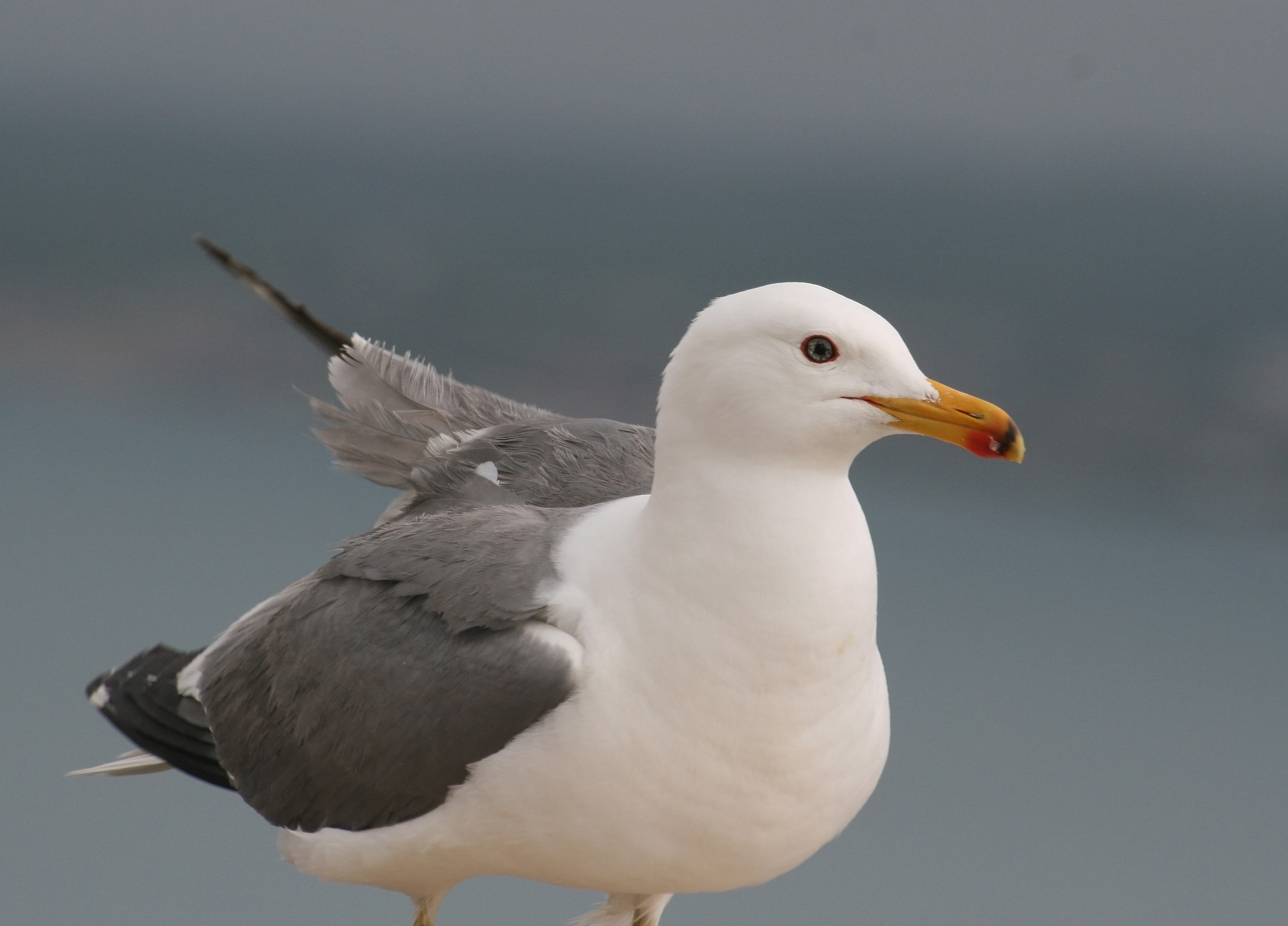

Conservation status
- Least Concern (IUCN 3.1)

Scientific classification
- Kingdom: Animalia
- Phylum: Chordata
- Class: Aves
- Order: Charadriiformes
- Family: Laridae
- Genus: Larus
- Species: L. armenicus

Binomial name
- Larus armenicus Buturlin, 1934
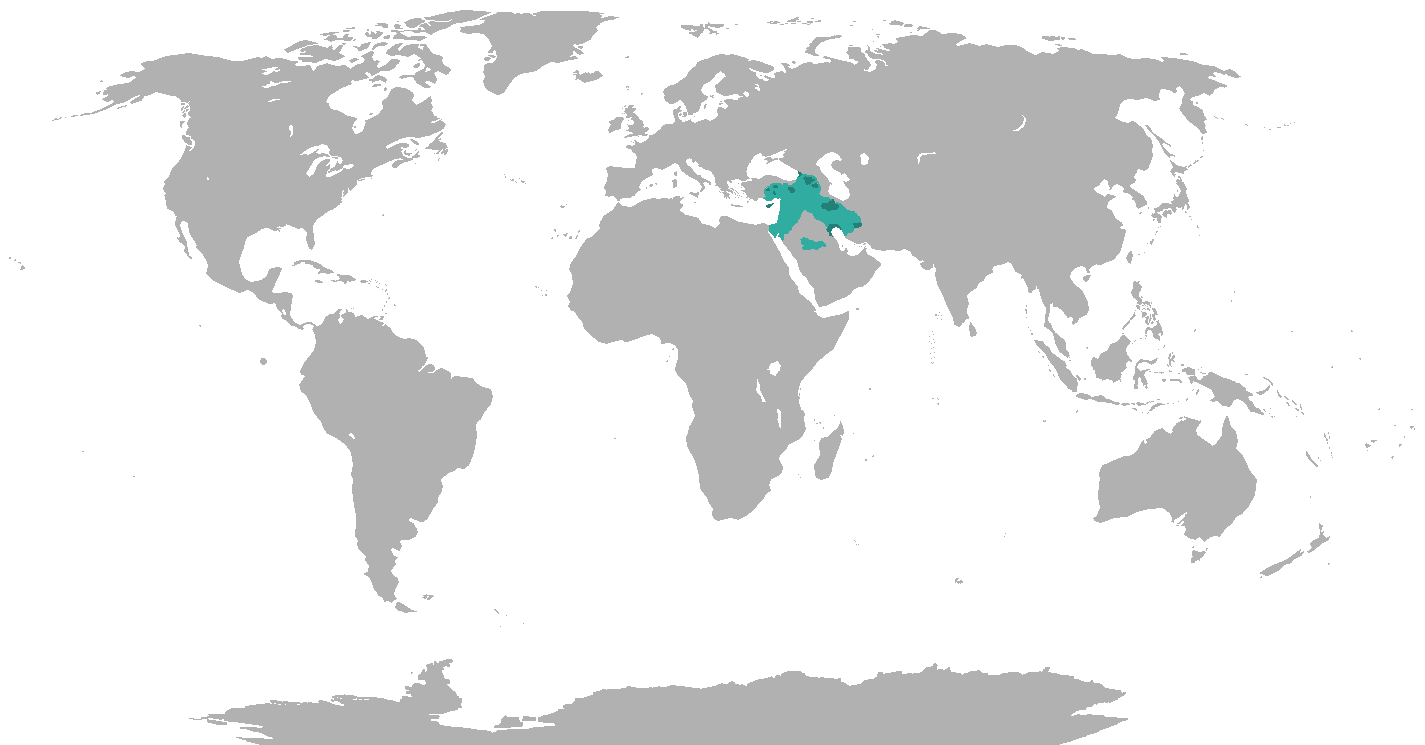

Synonyms
- Larus cachinnans armenicus

= Armenian gull =

Species of bird

The Armenian gull (Larus armenicus) is a large gull found in the Caucasus and the Middle East. It was formerly classified as a subspecies of the European herring gull (L. argentatus), but is now generally considered to be a separate species, although BirdLife International lumps it with the yellow-legged gull (L. michahellis).

== Description ==
The Armenian gull is a fairly large gull species, though it is on average the smallest of the "herring gull" complex. It can range from 52 to 62 cm (20 to 24 in), from 120 to 145 cm (47 to 57 in) across the wings, and weighs from 600 to 960 g (1.32 to 2.12 lb). Among standard measurements, its wing chord is 38.5 to 45.8 cm (15.2 to 18.0 in), its bill is 4.1 to 5.6 cm (1.6 to 2.2 in) and its tarsus is 5.7 to 6.4 cm (2.2 to 2.5 in). They are superficially similar to yellow-legged gulls but are slightly smaller with a slightly darker grey back and dark eyes. The area of black on the wingtips is more extensive with smaller white spots. The bill is short with a distinctive black band just before the tip. First-winter birds are mainly brown. They have a whitish rump, pale inner primary feathers, and a narrow, sharply defined black band on the tail. Although their ranges do not overlap, with its darkish mantle, both black and red near the tip of its bill and a dark eye, the Armenian gull bears a remarkable resemblance to the California gull (L. californicus) of North America.

== Distribution and habitat ==
The Armenian gull nests beside mountain lakes in Georgia, Armenia, Turkey, and western Iran. The largest colonies are at Lake Sevan and Lake Arpi in Armenia. It is a partial migrant, with many birds wintering on the coasts of Turkey, Lebanon, and Israel. Smaller numbers reach Cyprus, Egypt, and the Persian Gulf.

== Breeding ==
The nest is a mound of vegetation built on the ground on an island or the lakeshore. Three eggs are laid, mainly in late April. The nesting colonies are very dense with nests close together and territorial conflicts are common.

== Gallery ==
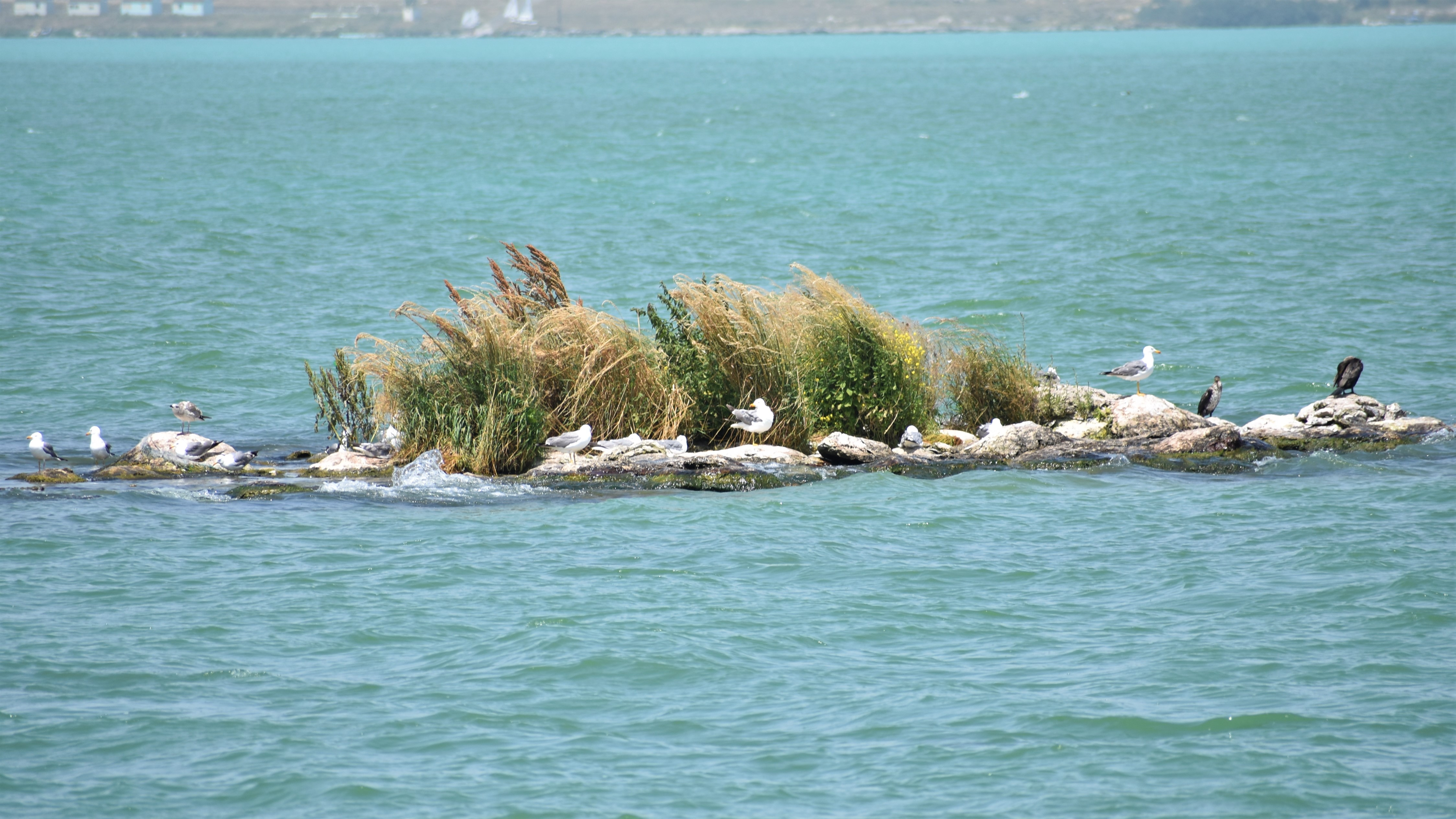
At Lake Sevan

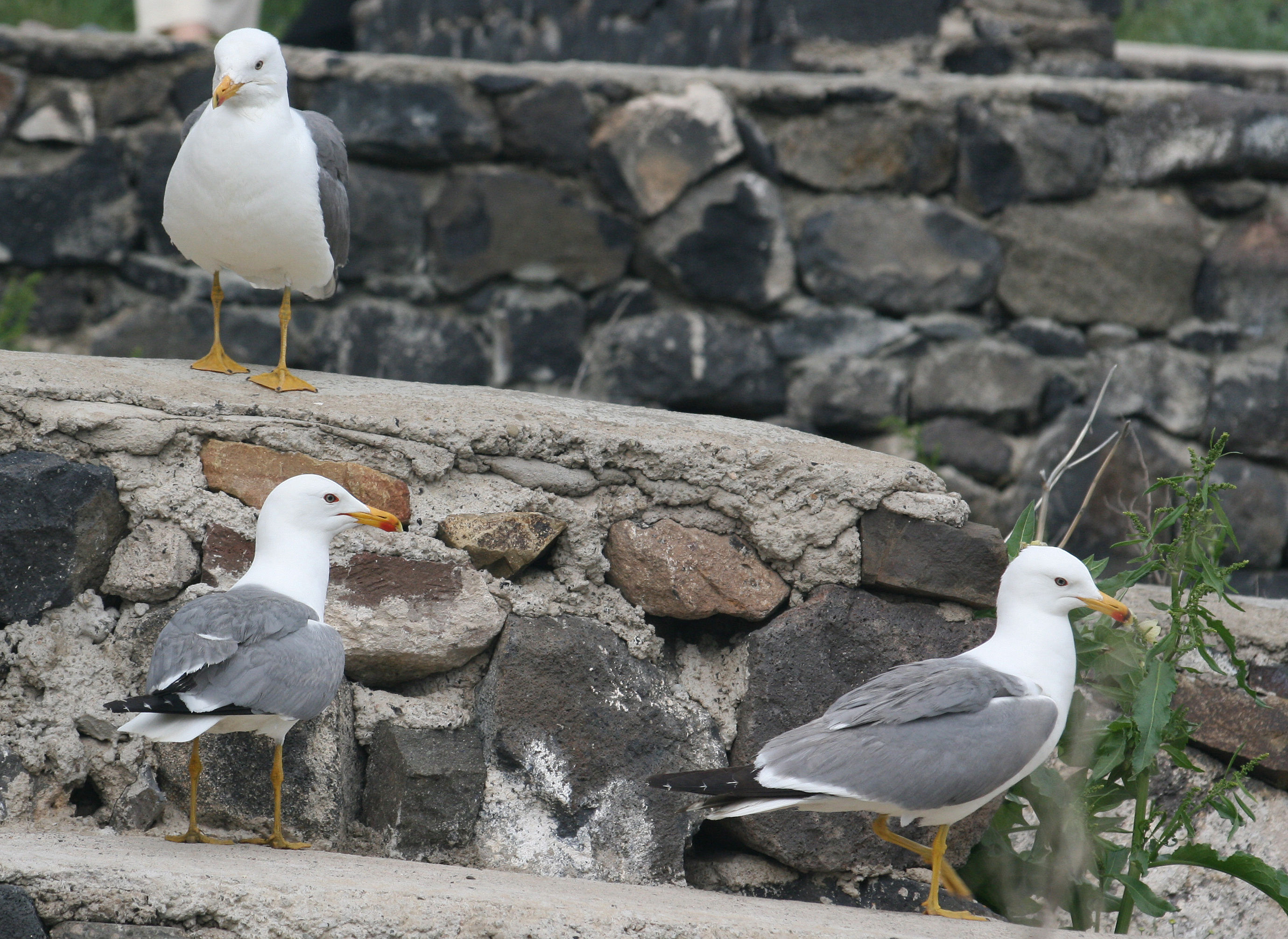
At Sevanavank monastery

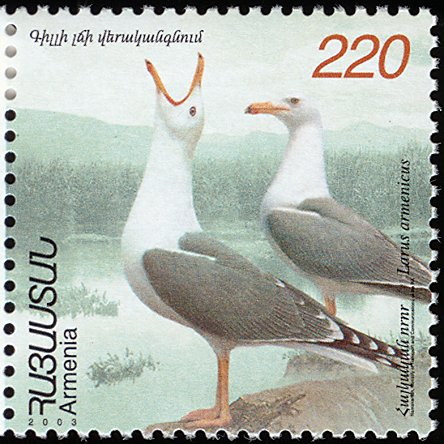
An illustration of Armenian gulls on a 2003 Armenian stamp

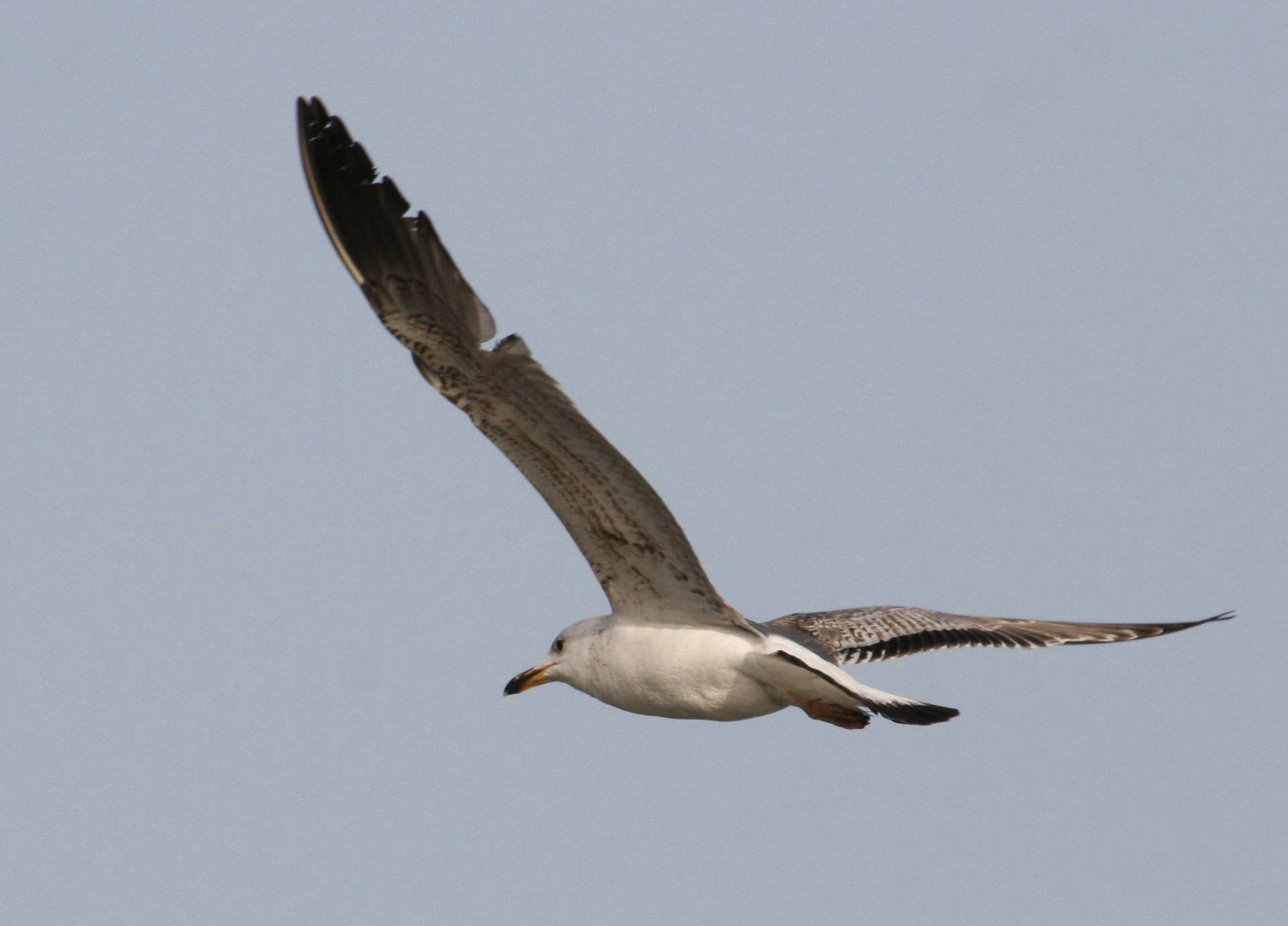
Juvenile of Armenian gull in flight, flying over Lake Sevan

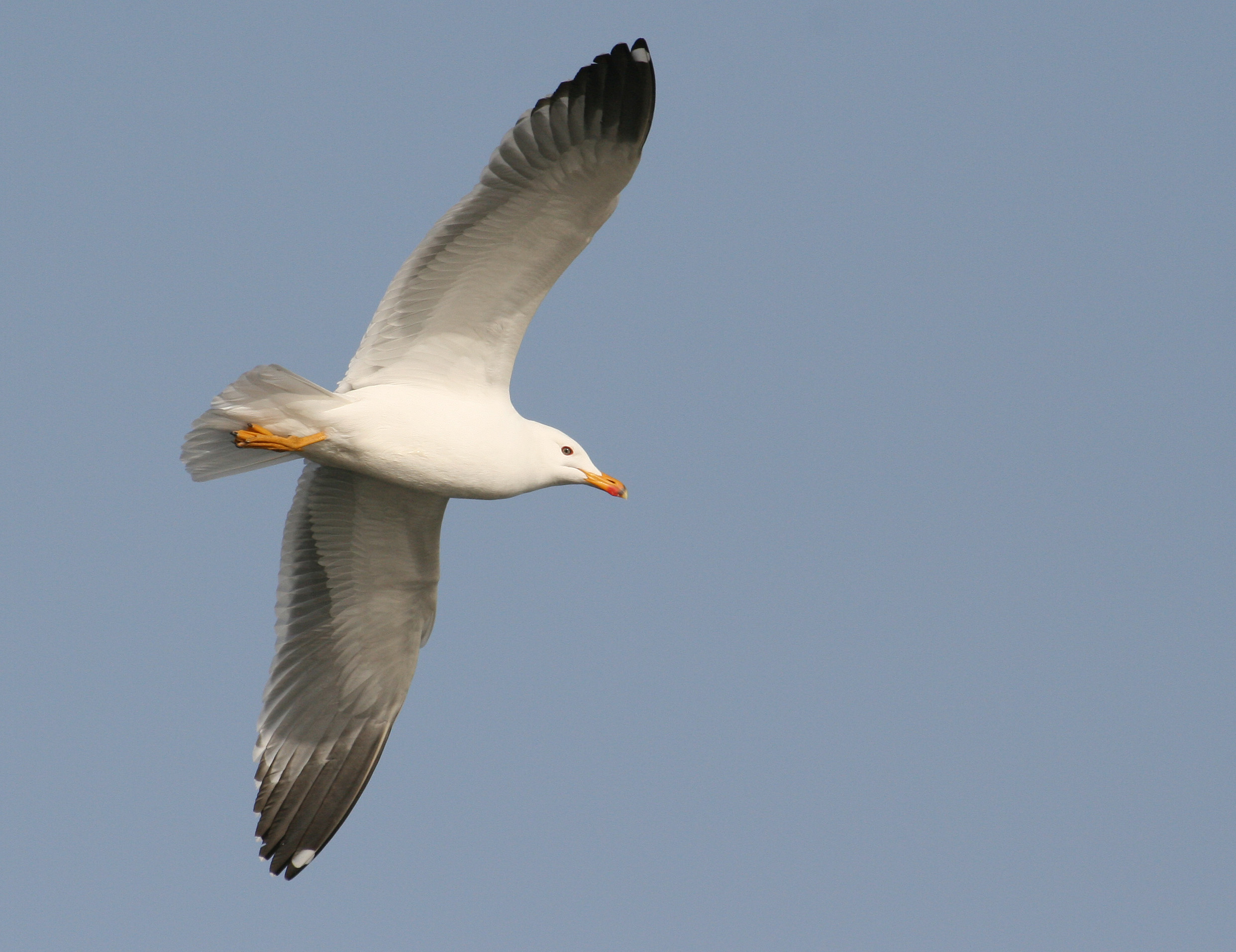

== Bibliography ==
- Alan Harris, Hadoram Shirihai & David Christie (1996) The Macmillan Birder's Guide to European and Middle Eastern Birds, Macmillan, London.
- D.W. Snow & C.M. Perrins (1998) The Birds of the Western Palearctic, Concise Edition (Vol. 1), Oxford University Press, Oxford.
- M.S. Adamian & D. Klem, Jr. (1997) A Field Guide to Birds of Armenia. American University of Armenia, ISBN 0-9657429-1-1
