= Lake Arpi =

Lake in Shirak Province, Armenia

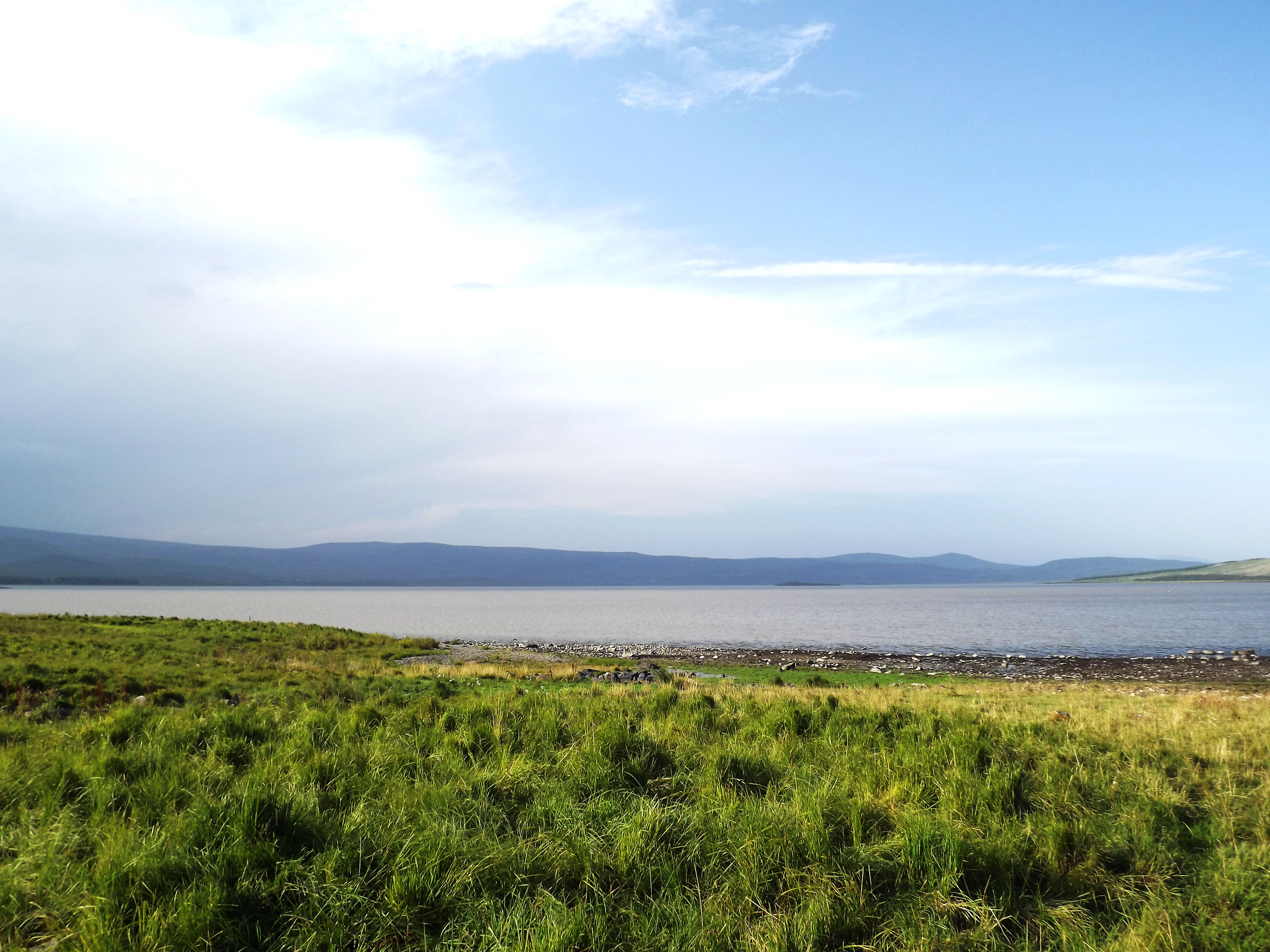

- Location within Armenia Location within Caucasus Mountains
- Interactive map of Lake Arpi
- Location: Shirak Province, Armenia
- Coordinates: 41°03′0″N 43°37′00″E
- Primary inflows: Streams and meltwater
- Primary outflows: Akhurian River
- Basin countries: Armenia
- Surface area: 20 km^{2} (7.7 sq mi)
- Average depth: 4.2 m (14 ft)
- Max. depth: 8 m (26 ft)
- Water volume: 90,000 km^{3} (22,000 cu mi)
- Surface elevation: 2,025 m (6,644 ft)

Ramsar Wetland
- Designated: 7 June 1993
- Reference no.: 621

Lake Arpi (Armenian: Արփի լիճ, romanized: Arp’i lich; Turkish: Arpa Göl) is a lake and reservoir located in the Shirak Province of Armenia, on the Ashotsk plateau in the northwestern part of the country. It sits at an altitude of 2,025 meters with an area of 20 square kilometers. It is the source of the Akhurian River.

Lake Arpi originated from a volcano tectonic earthquake. In 1946–1950, the Arpi Dam was built on the Akhurian River, artificially increasing the size of the lake. It was designed by Natalia Martirosyan. The reservoir's dam, made of reinforced concrete, is 10 meters high and 80 m long. Prior to the construction of the dam, the lake had a surface area of 4.5 km^{2}, a volume of 5 million m^{3}, and was 1.6 m deep. The reservoir-lake is 7.3 km long and 4.3 km wide, with a surface area of 20 km^{2}, an average depth of 4.2 m (maximum 8 m), and a volume of 90 million m^{3} (about 19 times more than the natural lake). Its maximum capacity is 105 million m^{3}. During the winter, it is usually completely covered by ice․ The lake is fed by meltwater and several springs and streams (Karmrajur, Yeghnajur, Elar, etc.). The reservoir is used for irrigation and hydropower production, irrigating farmlands in the plain of Shirak and the basin of the Upper Akhurian. The Talin and Armavir canals receive additional water from Lake Arpi.

The lake has rich flora and fauna. It was designated a Ramsar site in 1993, and a national park was established around the lake in 2009. More than 140 species of bird have been observed around the lake, of which 80–85 were nesting. It hosts the largest colony of Armenian gull in the world; pelicans and different species of ducks and migrating birds can also be seen there. The area is recognized as an Important Bird Area. Eurasian otters and water voles come to the reservoir via the Akhurian. Cyprinus and Varicorhinus inhabit its waters, among other species of fish. The total number of species of fish increased after the lake was turned into a reservoir. The lake is used for fish farming and fishing. In recent years, man-made factors have negatively affected the lake's ecology. Poaching and the use of unauthorized fishing methods have decreased the total population of fish, while periodic changes in the water level have been noticed.

Lake Arpi can be reached by road from the east from Ghazanchi or from the south from Amasia. Small boats are used to traverse the lake. A number of villages are located along its shores, such as Paghakn, Zorakert, and Tsaghkut.
