= Zorakert =

Village in Shirak, Armenia

Zorakert Զորակերտ
- Location within Armenia Location within Shirak
- Coordinates: 41°05′34″N 43°39′35″E
- Country: Armenia
- Province: Shirak
- Municipality: Amasia

Population (2011)
  - Total: 145
- Time zone: UTC+4

Zorakert (Armenian: Զորակերտ) is a village in the Amasia Municipality of the Shirak Province of Armenia.

== Name ==
Zorakert was formerly known as Balekhli (Armenian: Բալըխլի, Azerbaijani: Balıqlı). It was renamed Zorakert in April 1991.

== History ==
Zorakert was founded in the early nineteenth century. Its inhabitants moved there from the nearby village of Khanjalli, which is now abandoned. The village was previously populated mainly by Karapapakhs, a Turkic-speaking Sunni Muslim ethnic group. In the Tsarist period, the village was a part of the Agbaba sub-county (uchastok) of the Kars Oblast, which was annexed by the Russian Empire after the Russo-Turkish War of 1877–1878. Unlike the rest of the Kars Oblast, the Agbaba sub-county was not ceded to Turkey in 1921 and remained a part of Soviet Armenia. In the Soviet period, the village fell under the Amasia District of Soviet Armenia. Zorakert's Turkic population left mainly in late 1988. The village is now inhabited by Armenians.

== Geography ==
Zorakert is located on the northeastern shore of Lake Arpi, in a rocky and hilly area, at an elevation of 2030 meters above sea level. The climate is cold and precipitation is plenty. The village receives its drinking water through a pipeline from a source 4 kilometers away. It is 50 kilometers away from the provincial capital of Gyumri.

== Landmarks ==
A mosque dating to the 19th or 20th century is located in the village. The remains of an ancient fortress and gravesite are located on the hill to the northeast of the village.

== Economy ==
The main economic activities of the village are animal husbandry and the cultivation of vegetable crops.

== Demographics ==
The population of the village since 1886 is as follows:

Historical population
Year	Pop.	±% p.a.
1886	205	—
1912	398	+2.58%
1922	119	−11.37%
1931	205	+6.23%
1964	300	+1.16%
1970	440	+6.59%
1979	472	+0.78%
1989	212	−7.69%
2001	152	−2.73%
2011	145	−0.47%
