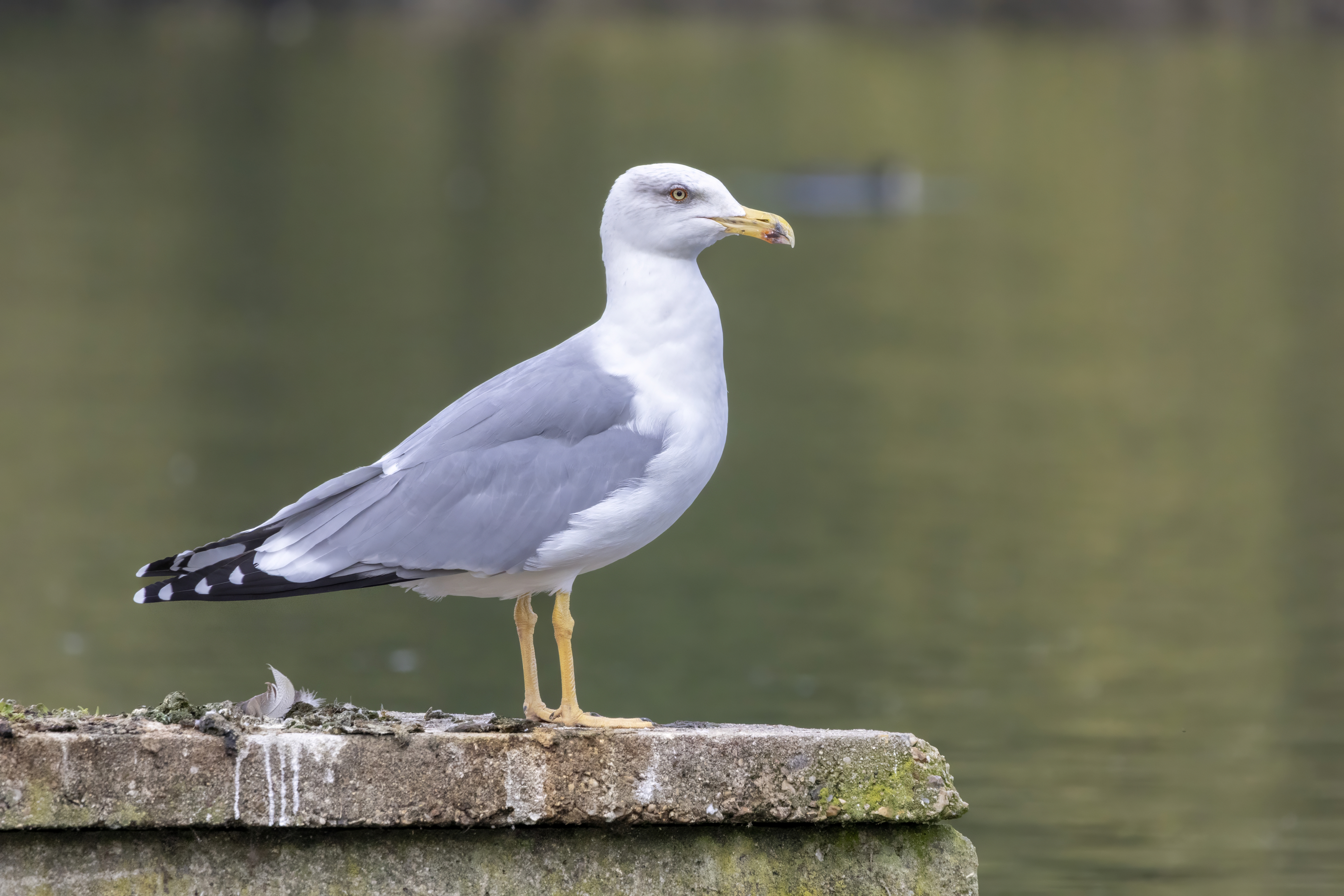
- Georges-Valbon, France
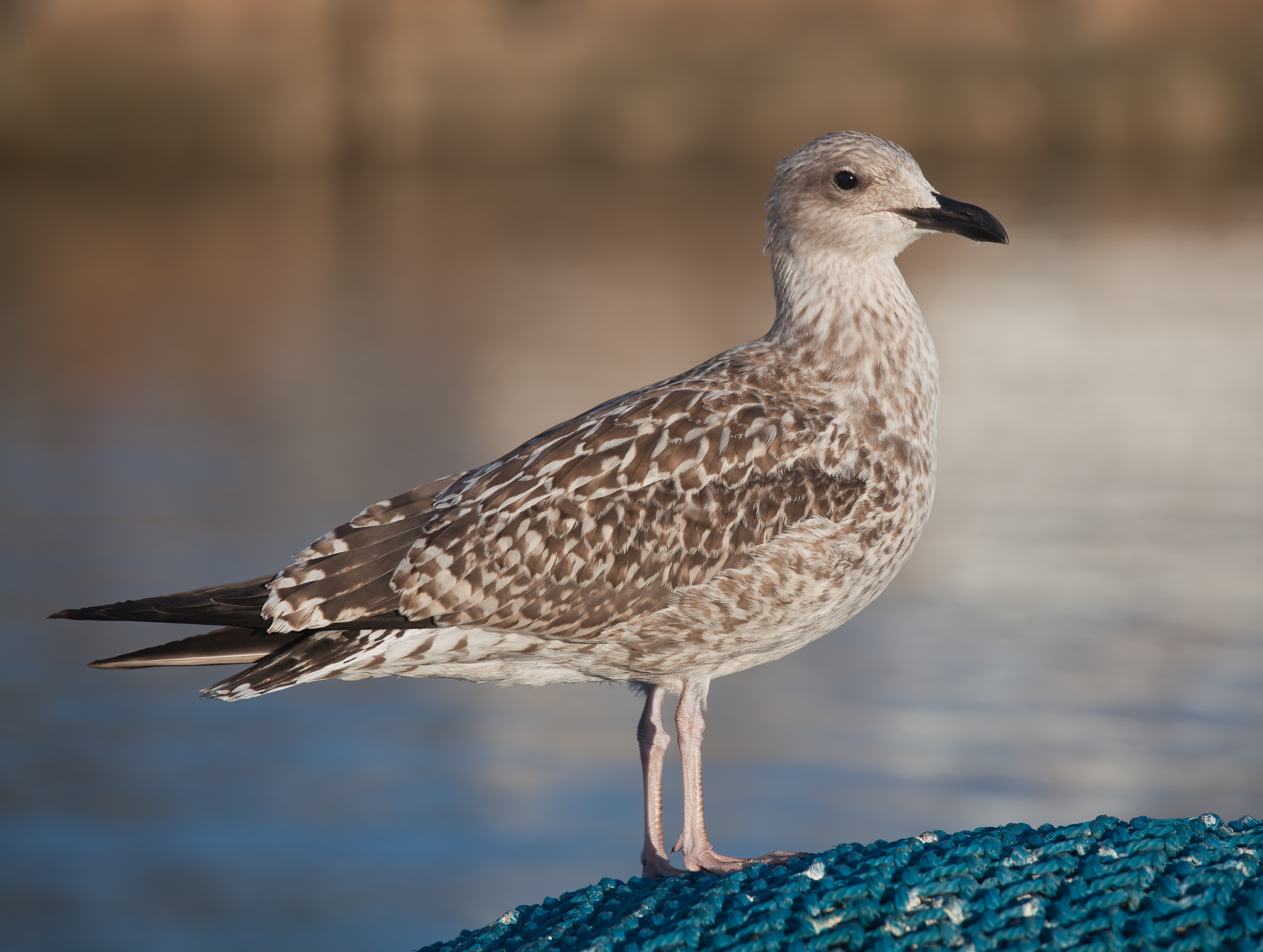
- Juvenile, Portosín, Porto do Son, Galicia, Spain

Conservation status
- Least Concern (IUCN 3.1)

Scientific classification
- Kingdom: Animalia
- Phylum: Chordata
- Class: Aves
- Order: Charadriiformes
- Family: Laridae
- Genus: Larus
- Species: L. michahellis

Binomial name
- Larus michahellis Naumann, 1840

Synonyms
- Larus argentatus michahellis Naumann, 1840; Larus cachinnans michahellis Naumann, 1840; Larus cachinnans atlantis Larus cachinnans lusitanius

= Yellow-legged gull =

Species of bird

The yellow-legged gull or western yellow-legged gull (Larus michahellis) is a large gull found in Europe, the Middle East and North Africa, which has only recently achieved wide recognition as a distinct species. It was formerly treated as a subspecies of either the Caspian gull L. cachinnans, or more broadly as a subspecies of the herring gull L. argentatus. The genus name is from Latin Larus which appears to have referred to a gull or other large seabird, and the species name honours the German zoologist Karl Michahelles.

== Classification ==
It is now generally accepted that the yellow-legged gull is a full species, but until recently there was much disagreement. For example, British Birds magazine split the yellow-legged gull from the herring gull in 1993 but included the Caspian gull in the former, but the BOU in Great Britain retained the yellow-legged gull as a subspecies of the herring gull until 2007. DNA research, however, suggests that the yellow-legged gull is actually closest to the great black-backed gull L. marinus and the Armenian gull L. armenicus, while the Caspian gull is closer to the herring gull and the lesser black-backed gull L. fuscus, rather than being each other's closest relatives.

There are two subspecies of the yellow-legged gull:

Image	Subspecies	Distribution
	L. m. michahellis Naumann, 1840	nominate, found in western and southern Europe, northwestern Africa, and the Mediterranean.
	L. m. atlantis (Dwight, 1922), syn. Larus fuscus atlantis, Dwight, 1922	found in Macaronesia (the Canary Islands, Madeira, the Azores). This subspecies is also sometimes known as the Atlantic gull and is potentially a full species in its own right. Birds breeding on the Atlantic coasts of Morocco, Portugal and Galicia (and spreading north from there) are usually also included here, but are sometimes considered to be a third subspecies, L. m. lusitanius. Atlantic Ocean birds have darker wings and back in comparison with Mediterranean birds, creating a more pronounced contrast to the white parts.

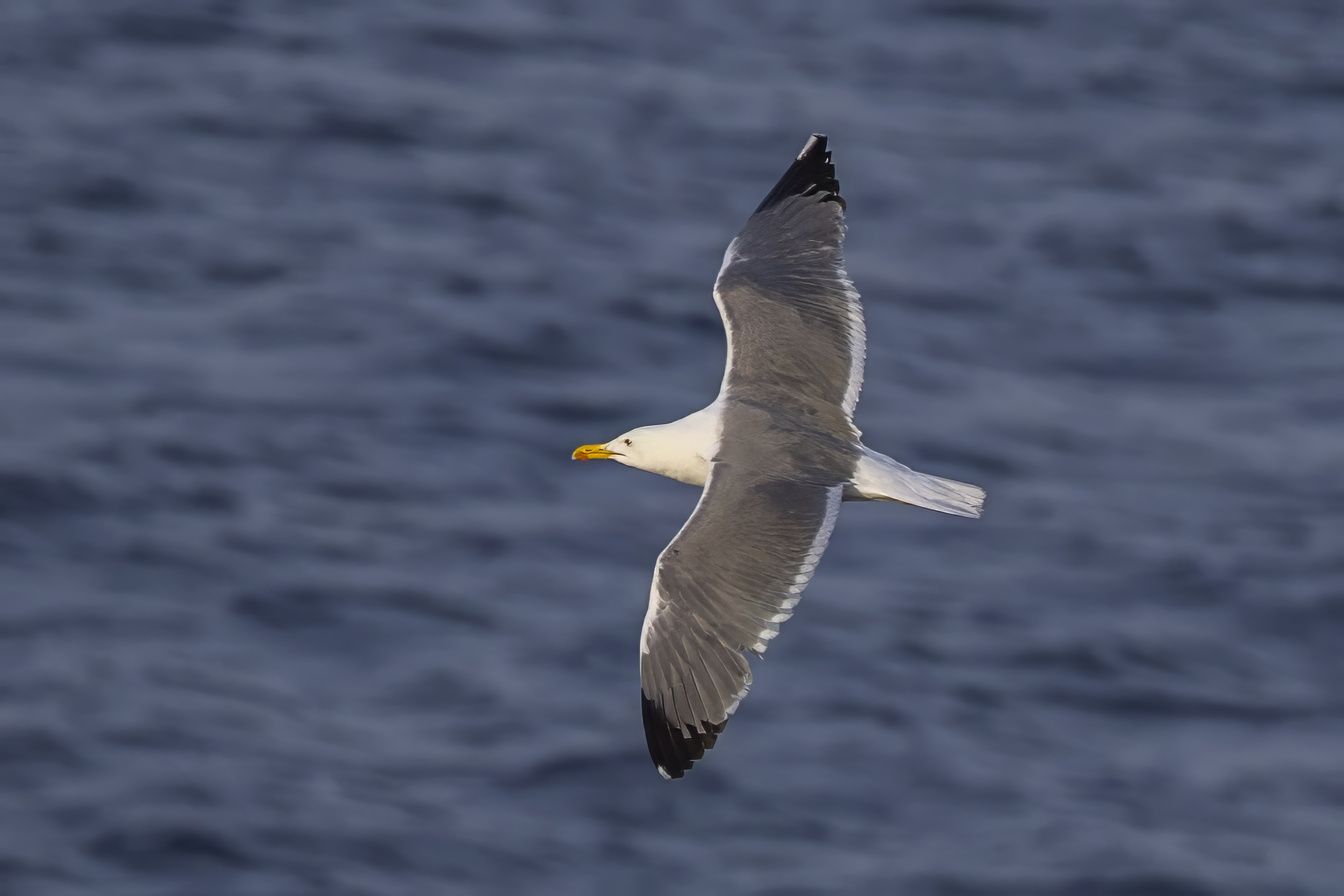
adult, Malta

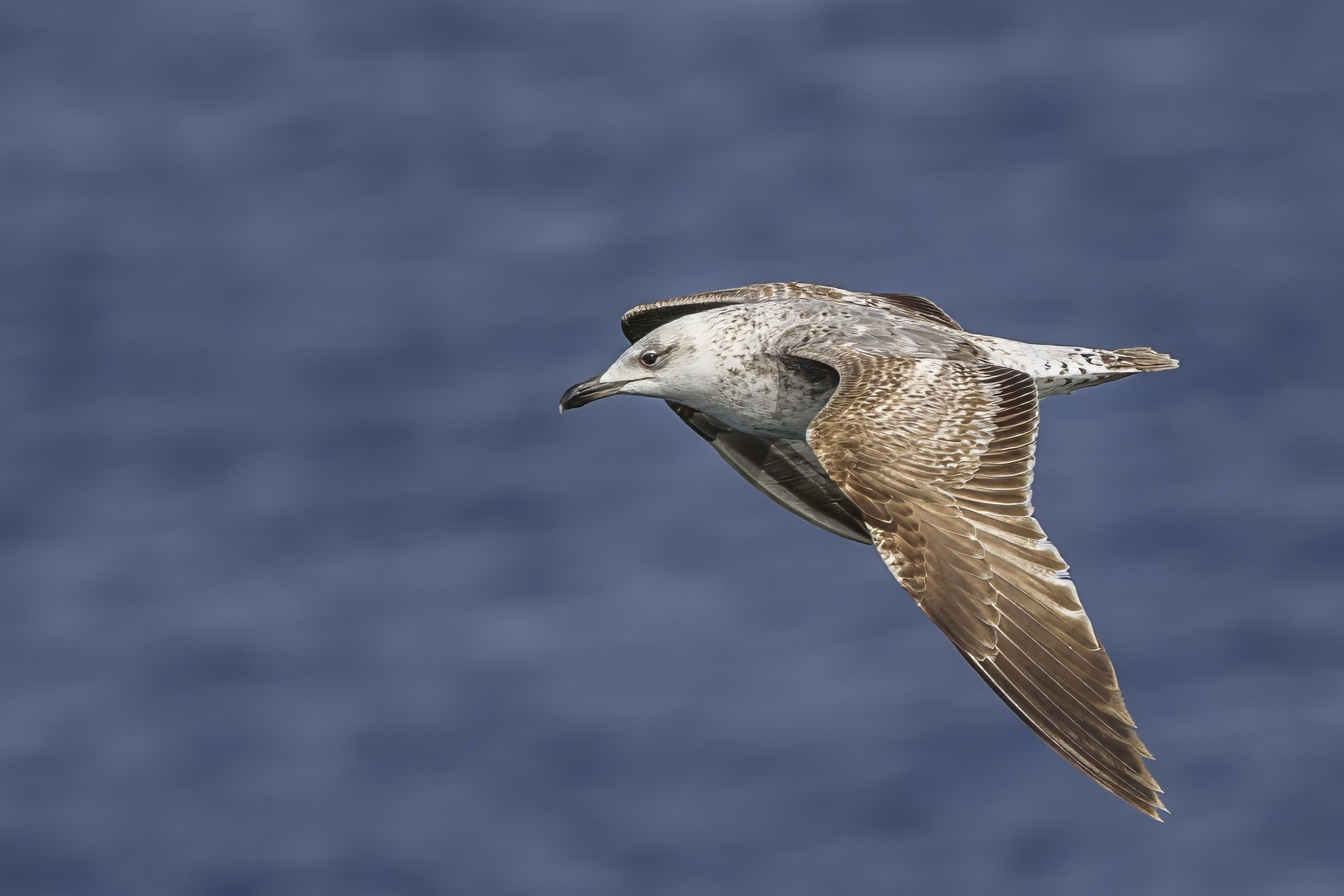
juvenile, Malta

== Distribution ==
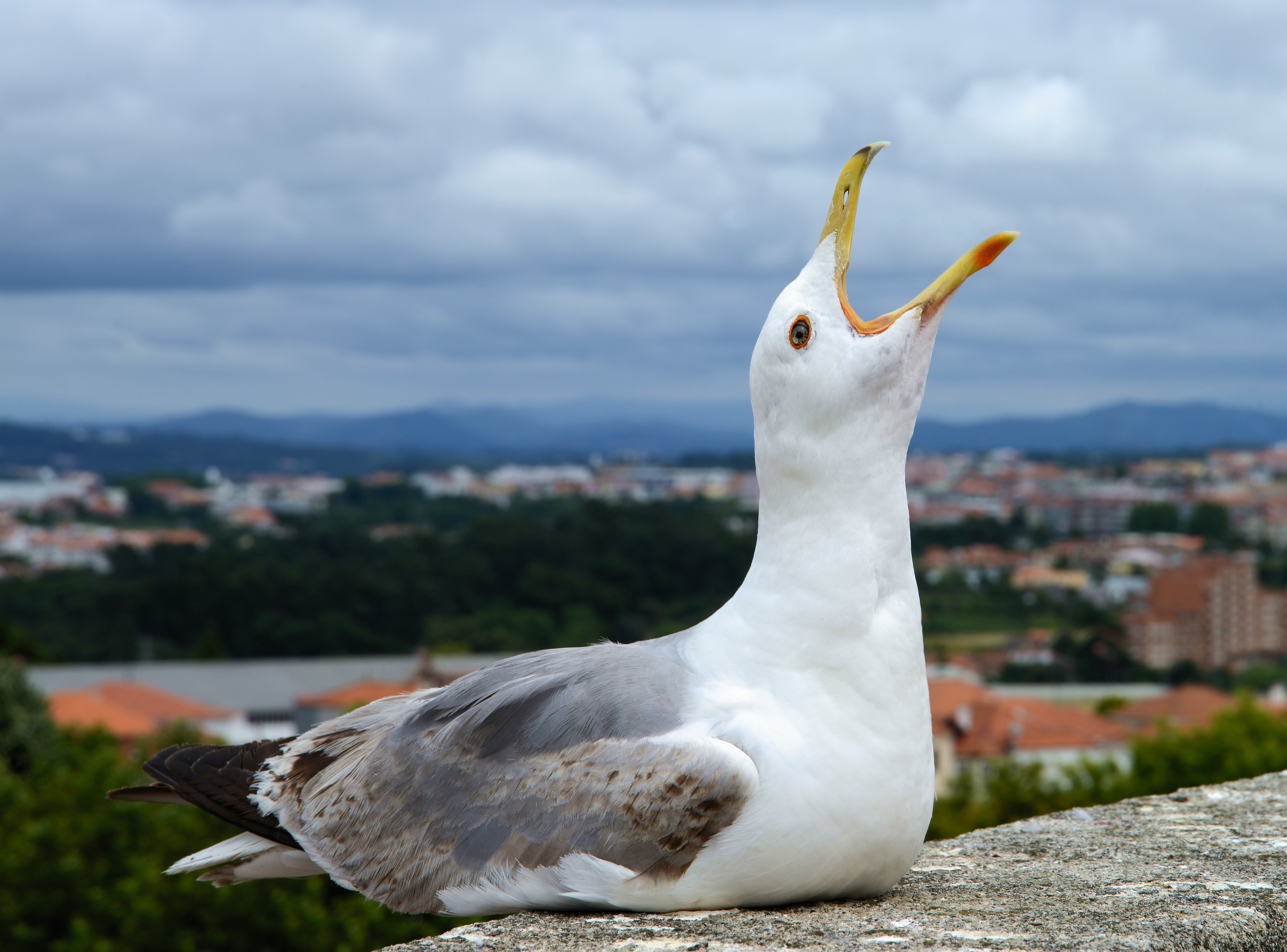
Yellow-legged gull in Porto, Portugal

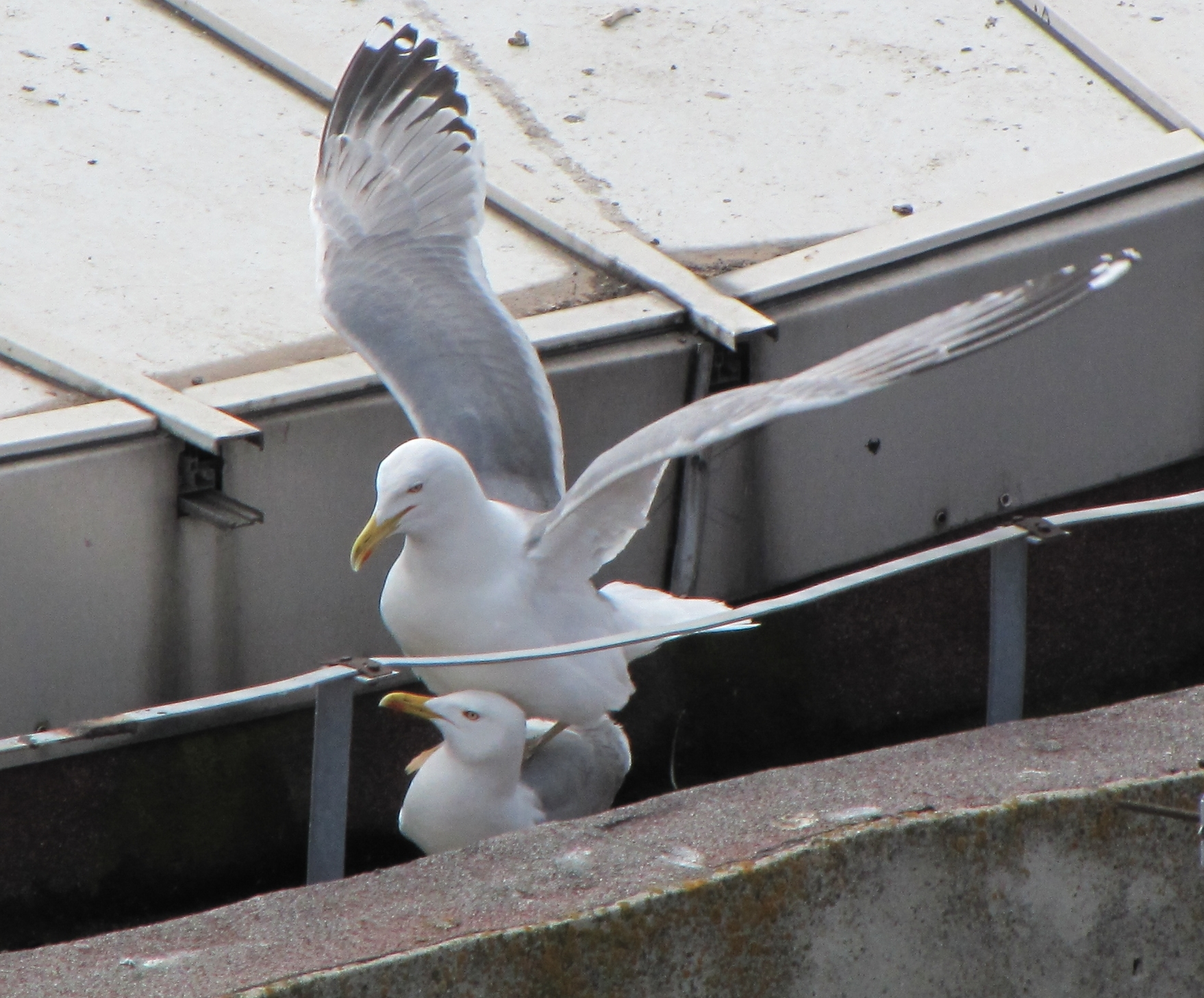
Mating on roof-top, Constanta, Romania

The breeding range is centred on the Mediterranean Sea. In North Africa, it is common in Morocco, Algeria and Tunisia and increasing in places. Recent breeding has occurred in Libya and Egypt. In the Middle East, a few breed in Israel, Palestine and Syria with larger numbers in Cyprus and Turkey. In Europe, there are colonies all along the Mediterranean coast, and also on the Atlantic islands and coasts north to Brittany and west to the Azores. It also breeds on the western side of the Black Sea; here it overlaps with the Caspian gull but there is a difference in habitat, with the yellow-legged gull preferring sea cliffs and the Caspian gull flatter shores. In recent decades birds have spread north into central and western Europe. One to four pairs have attempted to breed in southern England since 1995 (sometimes hybrid pairs with lesser black-backed gulls), though colonisation has been very slow.

Many birds remain in the same area all year round, but others migrate to spend the winter in mild areas of western Europe or head south as far as Senegal, Gambia and the Red Sea. There is also extensive northward post-breeding dispersal in the late summer, with numbers in southern England high from July to October. It is reported as a vagrant to northeastern North America and Nigeria.

== Description ==
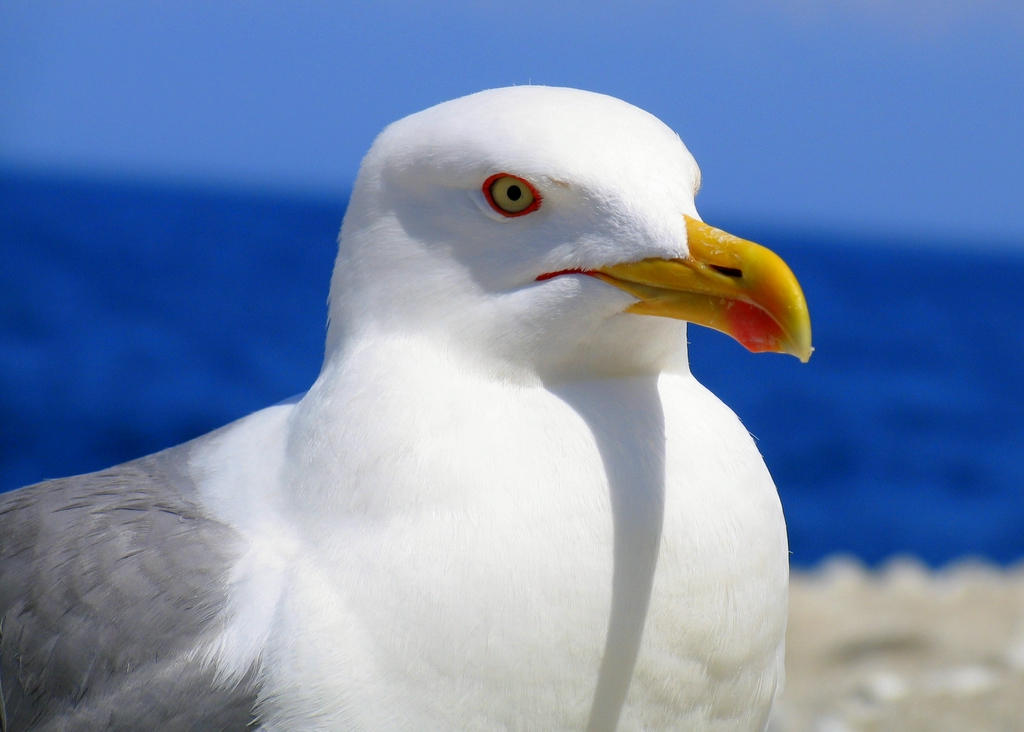
Nominate L. m. michahellis, Elba

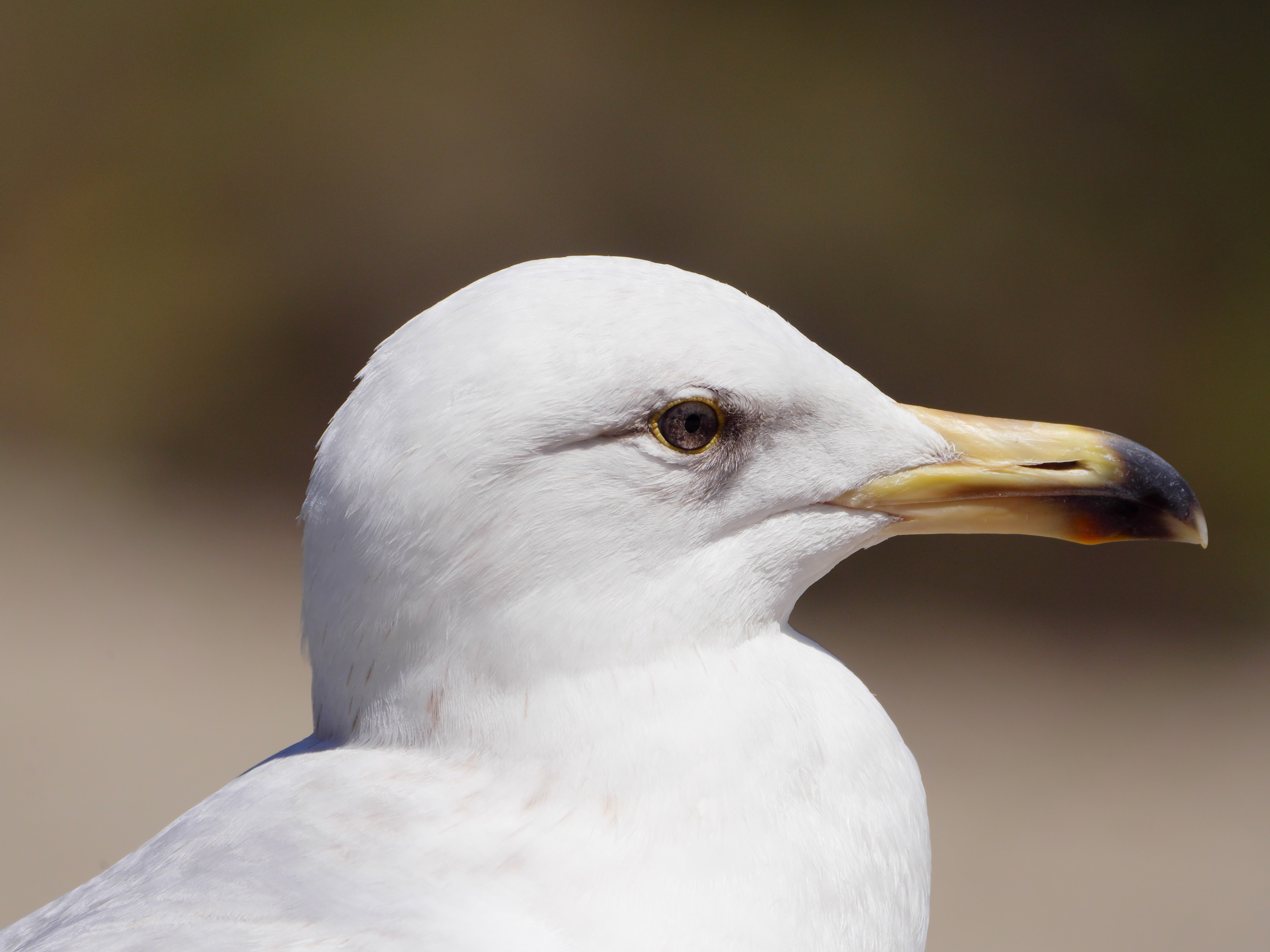
Head of a two-year old yellow-legged gull taken at the Breton coast

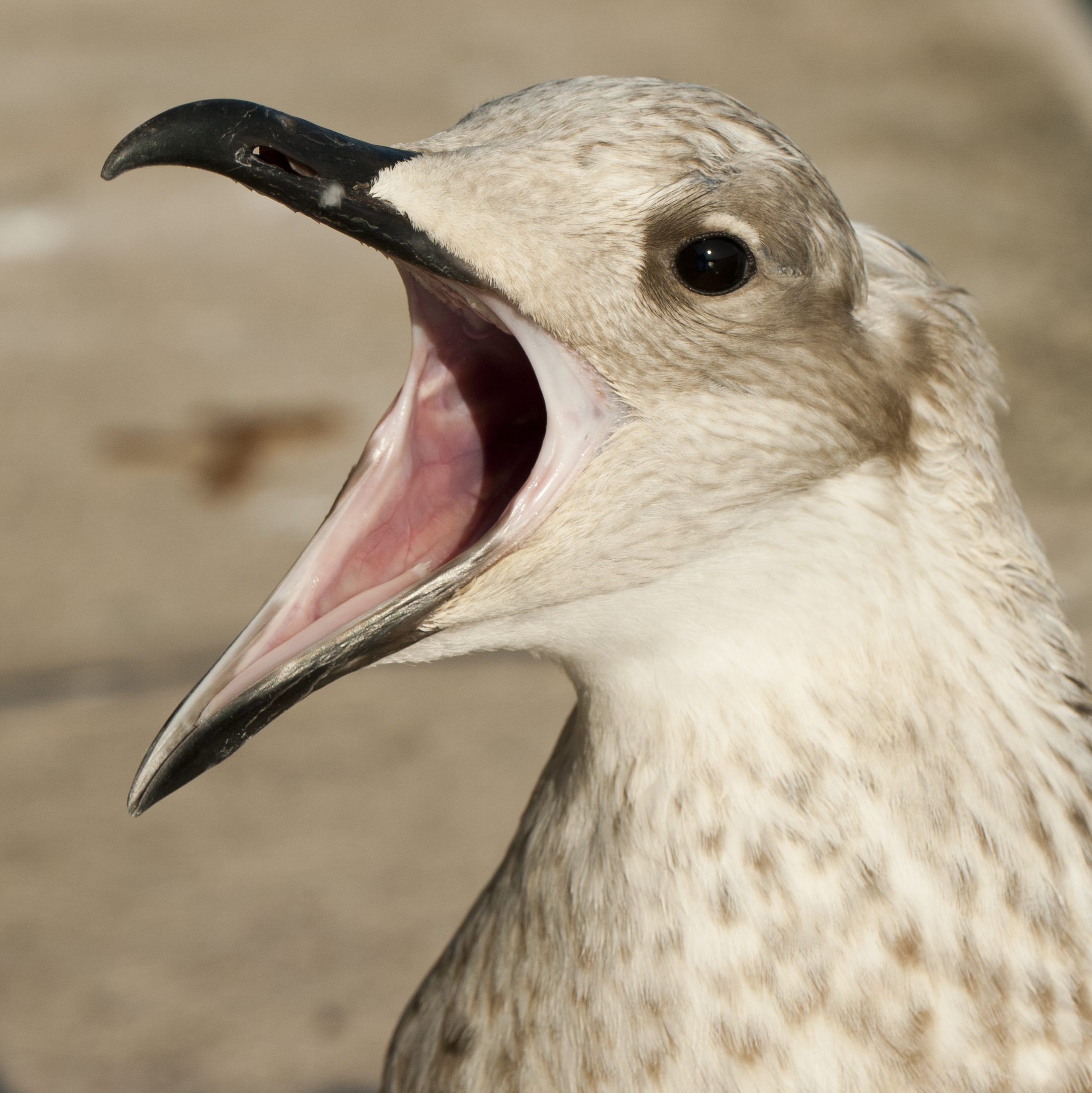
Juvenile with open beak

The yellow-legged gull is a large gull, though the size does vary, with the smallest females being scarcely larger than a common gull and the largest males being roughly the size of a great black-backed gull. They range in length from 52 to 68 cm (20 to 27 in) in total length, from 120 to 155 cm (47 to 61 in) in wingspan and from 550 to 1,600 g (1.21 to 3.53 lb) in weight. Among standard measurements, the wing chord is 40.8 to 47.2 cm (16.1 to 18.6 in), the bill is 4.6 to 6 cm (1.8 to 2.4 in) and the tarsus is 5.6 to 7.5 cm (2.2 to 3.0 in). Adults are externally similar to herring gulls but have yellow legs. They have a grey back, slightly darker than herring gulls but lighter than lesser black-backed gulls. They are much whiter-headed in autumn, and have more extensively black wing tips with few white spots, just as lesser black-backed. They have a red spot on the bill as adults, like the entire complex. There is a red ring around the eye like in the lesser black-backed gull but unlike in the herring gull which has a dark yellow ring.

First-year birds have a paler head, rump and underparts than those of the herring gull, more closely resembling first-year great black-backed gulls in plumage. They have a dark bill and eyes, pinkish grey legs, dark flight feathers and a well-defined black band on the tail. They become lighter in the underparts and lose the upperpart pattern subsequently. By their second winter, birds are essentially feathered like adults, save for the patterned feathers remaining on the wing coverts. However, their bill tips are black, their eyes still dark, and the legs are a light yellow flesh colour.

The call is a loud laugh which is deeper and more nasal than the call of the herring gull.

== Diet ==
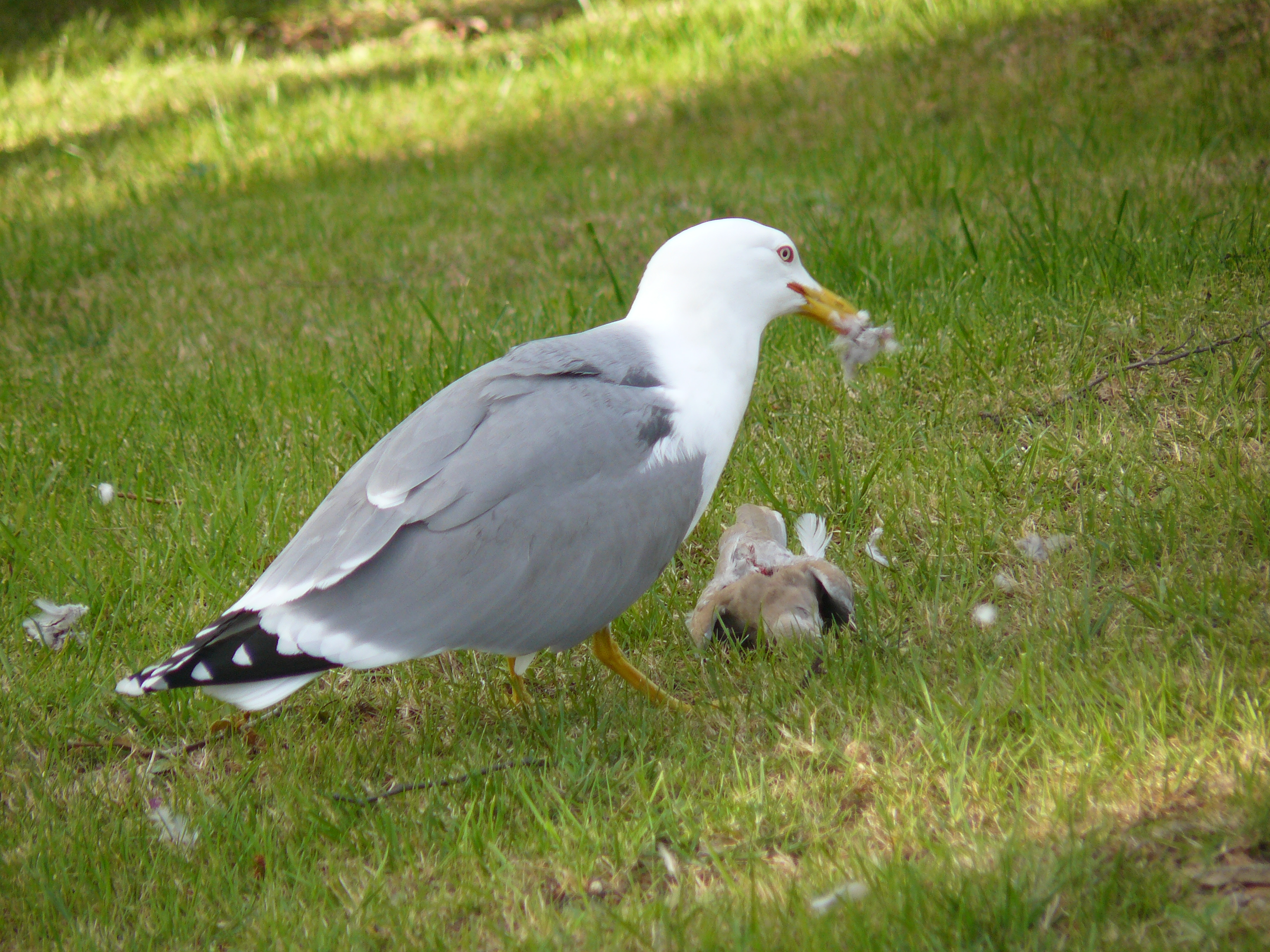
Yellow-legged gull eating a Eurasian collared dove in Barcelona

Like most Larus gulls, they are omnivores and opportunistic foragers. They will scavenge on rubbish tips and elsewhere, as well as seeking suitable prey in fields or on the coast, or robbing smaller gulls and other seabirds of their catches. Although urban populations are generally opportunistic scavengers, they can shift to a predatory diet if necessary; this was observed during the lockdown of Italy in 2020, when the lack of food scraps led the yellow-legged gulls of Rome to take prey as large as rats and rock doves.

Atlantic gulls in Gibraltar have been observed and photographed picking and eating fruit from olive trees in flight. A study of a yellow-legged gull population breeding in the south-eastern part of the Bay of Biscay showed little overlap with fishing vessels, indicating that this population did not obtain most of its fish prey from interactions with offshore fishing activity but most possibly by taking fish remains in harbours and by feeding themselves.

== Reproduction ==
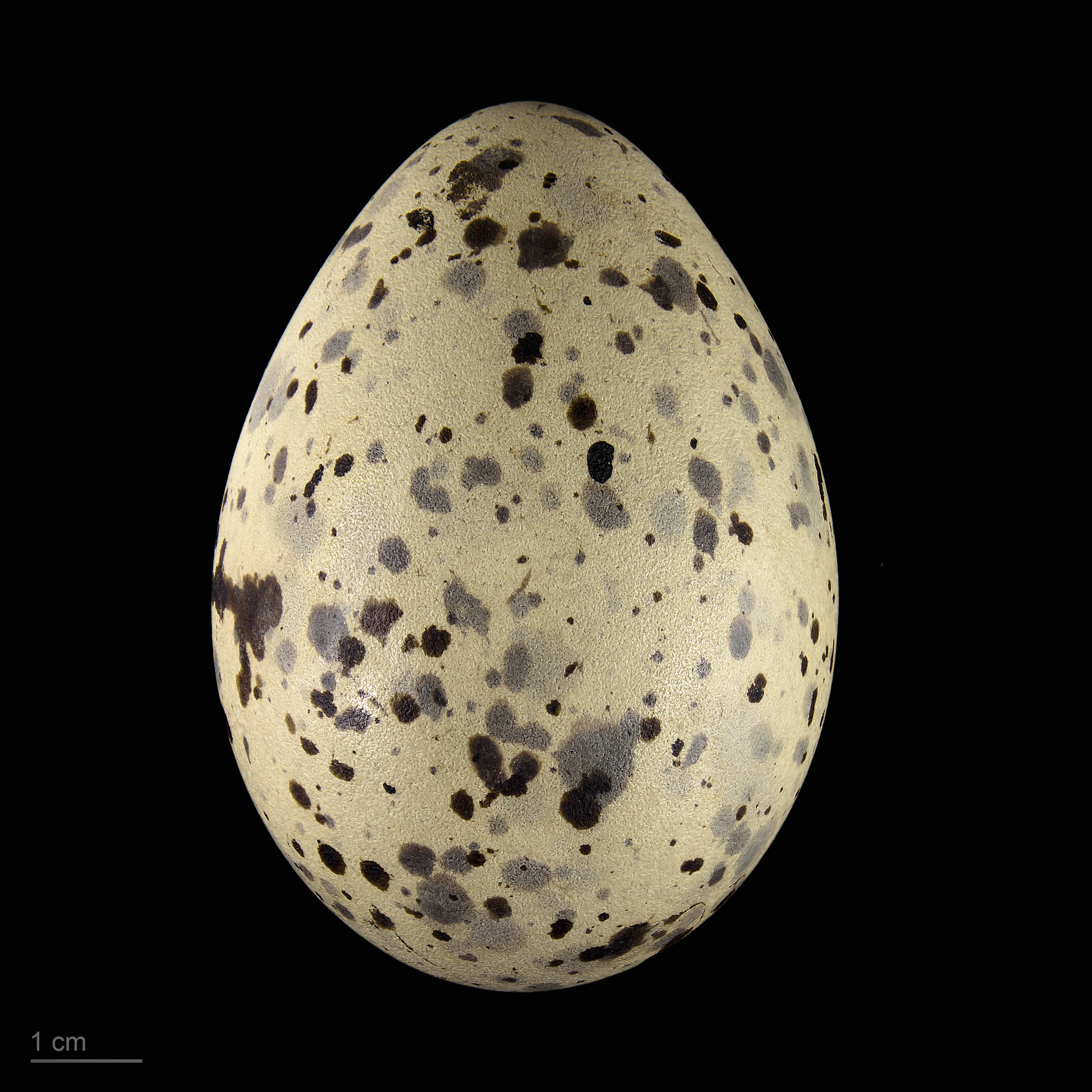
Larus michahellis atlantis - MHNT.

Three yellow-legged gull eggs in a ground nest in the Azores.

A yellow-legged gull egg in a ground nest with a 2-euro coin for scale.

Yellow-legged gulls usually breed in colonies. Eggs, usually three, are laid from mid March to early May and are defended vigorously by this large gull. The nest is a sometimes sparse mound of vegetation built on the ground or on cliff ledges. In some places, such as Gibraltar, Galicia and Portugal, they have started nesting on buildings, inside cities and even on trees. The eggs are incubated for 27–31 days and the young birds fledge after 35–40 days.
