= Jurinea akinfievii =

Conservation status
- Critically Imperiled (NatureServe)

Scientific classification
- Kingdom: Plantae
- Clade: Tracheophytes
- Clade: Angiosperms
- Clade: Eudicots
- Clade: Asterids
- Order: Asterales
- Family: Asteraceae
- Genus: Jurinea
- Species: J. akinfievii

Binomial name
- Jurinea akinfievii Nemirova

Species of plant

Jurinea akinfievii, the Akinfiev's jurinea, is a herbaceous plant, a member of the tribe Cardueae within the Asteraceae family.

== Distribution ==
It is a species native to the Caucusus.

== Taxonomy ==
It was named by E.S. Nemirova, in Cass. In: Bull. Soc. Philom. 140. in 1821.
