= Jurinea cretacea =

Scientific classification
- Kingdom: Plantae
- Clade: Embryophytes
- Clade: Tracheophytes
- Clade: Spermatophytes
- Clade: Angiosperms
- Clade: Eudicots
- Clade: Asterids
- Order: Asterales
- Family: Asteraceae
- Genus: Jurinea
- Species: J. cretacea

Binomial name
- Jurinea cretacea Bunge

Species of flowering plant

Jurinea cretacea is a species of flowering plant in the family Asteraceae, native to Ukraine and south European Russia. It is confined to chalk outcrops.
