= AKNA =

Protein-coding gene in the species Homo sapiens

Identifiers
- Aliases: AKNA, AT-hook transcription factor
- External IDs: OMIM: 605729; MGI: 2140340; HomoloGene: 49947; GeneCards: AKNA; OMA:AKNA - orthologs

Gene location (Human)
Chr.	Chromosome 9 (human)
Band	9q32	Start	114,334,156 bp
Band	9q32	End	114,394,405 bp

Gene location (Mouse)
Chr.	Chromosome 4 (mouse)
Band	4|4 B3-C1	Start	63,367,125 bp
Band	4|4 B3-C1	End	63,403,354 bp
RNA expression pattern
Bgee	Human / Mouse (ortholog); Top expressed in: granulocyte; blood; bone marrow cell; spleen; appendix; monocyte; lymph node; right uterine tube; epithelium of colon; mucosa of ileum / Top expressed in: granulocyte; lymph node; mesenteric lymph nodes; spleen; blood; Rostral migratory stream; thymus; bone marrow; tibiofemoral joint; subcutaneous adipose tissue; More reference expression data
BioGPS	n/a
Gene ontology
Molecular function	RNA polymerase II cis-regulatory region sequence-specific DNA binding; DNA binding; DNA-binding transcription activator activity, RNA polymerase II-specific; DNA-binding transcription factor activity, RNA polymerase II-specific
Cellular component	membrane; nucleus; fibrillar center; nucleoplasm; centrosome; cytosol; intracellular membrane-bounded organelle; centriole; microtubule; cytoplasm; cytoskeleton
Biological process	regulation of transcription, DNA-templated; positive regulation of transcription by RNA polymerase II; transcription, DNA-templated; transcription by RNA polymerase II; epithelial to mesenchymal transition; neuroblast division in subventricular zone; regulation of inflammatory response; delamination; neuroblast delamination; nervous system development
Sources:Amigo / QuickGO
Orthologs
Species	Human	Mouse
Entrez	80709	100182
Ensembl	ENSG00000106948	ENSMUSG00000039158
UniProt	Q7Z591	Q80VW7
RefSeq (mRNA)	NM_030767; NM_001317950; NM_001317952	NM_001045514; NM_001305432
RefSeq (protein)	NP_001304879; NP_001304881; NP_110394	NP_001038979; NP_001292361
Location (UCSC)	Chr 9: 114.33 – 114.39 Mb	Chr 4: 63.37 – 63.4 Mb
PubMed search
- Wikidata
View/Edit Human	View/Edit Mouse

AKNA is a protein that in humans is encoded by the AKNA gene. The protein is an AT-hook transcription factor which contains an AT-hook binding motif. The protein is expressed as different isoforms. AKNA is known to upregulate expression of the receptor CD40 and its ligand CD40L/CD154.

AKNA is an essential part in the construction, organization, and proliferation of the centrosomal microtubules in order to maintain the neural stem cells during the process of neurogenesis. Due to these functions AKNA plays in the centrosomal microtubules it also has an active role in delamination during the formation of the subventricular zone, and the regulation of the amount of access provided to cells in this zone. Furthermore, because of AKNA's role in the centrosomal microtubules it also plays a part in the management of the modification of epithelial cells losing their polarity and attachment, and transforming into the mobile mesenchymal stem cells, epithelial-mesenchymal transition (EMT). This occurs because the alongside the increase in centrosomal microtubules both nucleation factors and minus end stabilizers are also increasing, causing the apical endfoot to have its constriction regulated because this affects the microtubules found at adherens junctions.

== Etymology ==
AKNA derives its name from the word "mother" in Inuit and Mayan language, and it's link to their mythology. For in Inuit and Mayan culture AKNA is the "goddess of fertility and childbirth". This connection is made from the observations of what occurs to mice that are missing the AKNA protein. In mice lacking AKNA their body very rapidly enters an increasing weakened state, very similarly to as if they did not have a mother to support them, and are not likely to live longer than 10 day's.

== In humans ==
The AKNA protein in humans has been found to be associated with cervical cancer. This is due to it being located on the 9q32 chromosome, in the FRA9E region. It is not uncommon for this chromosome to play a role in neoplasm and inflammatory diseases because how frequently it undergoes loss of function.
