= Jurinea modesta =

Scientific classification
- Kingdom: Plantae
- Clade: Tracheophytes
- Clade: Angiosperms
- Clade: Eudicots
- Clade: Asterids
- Order: Asterales
- Family: Asteraceae
- Genus: Jurinea
- Species: J. modesta

Binomial name
- Jurinea modesta Boiss.

Synonyms
- Hyalochaete modesta (Boiss.) Dittrich & Rech.f.; Jurinea dschelalabadensis Bornm.

Species of plant

Jurinea modesta is a species of flowering plant in the family Asteraceae, native to Afghanistan and west Pakistan. It was first described by Pierre Edmond Boissier in 1856.
