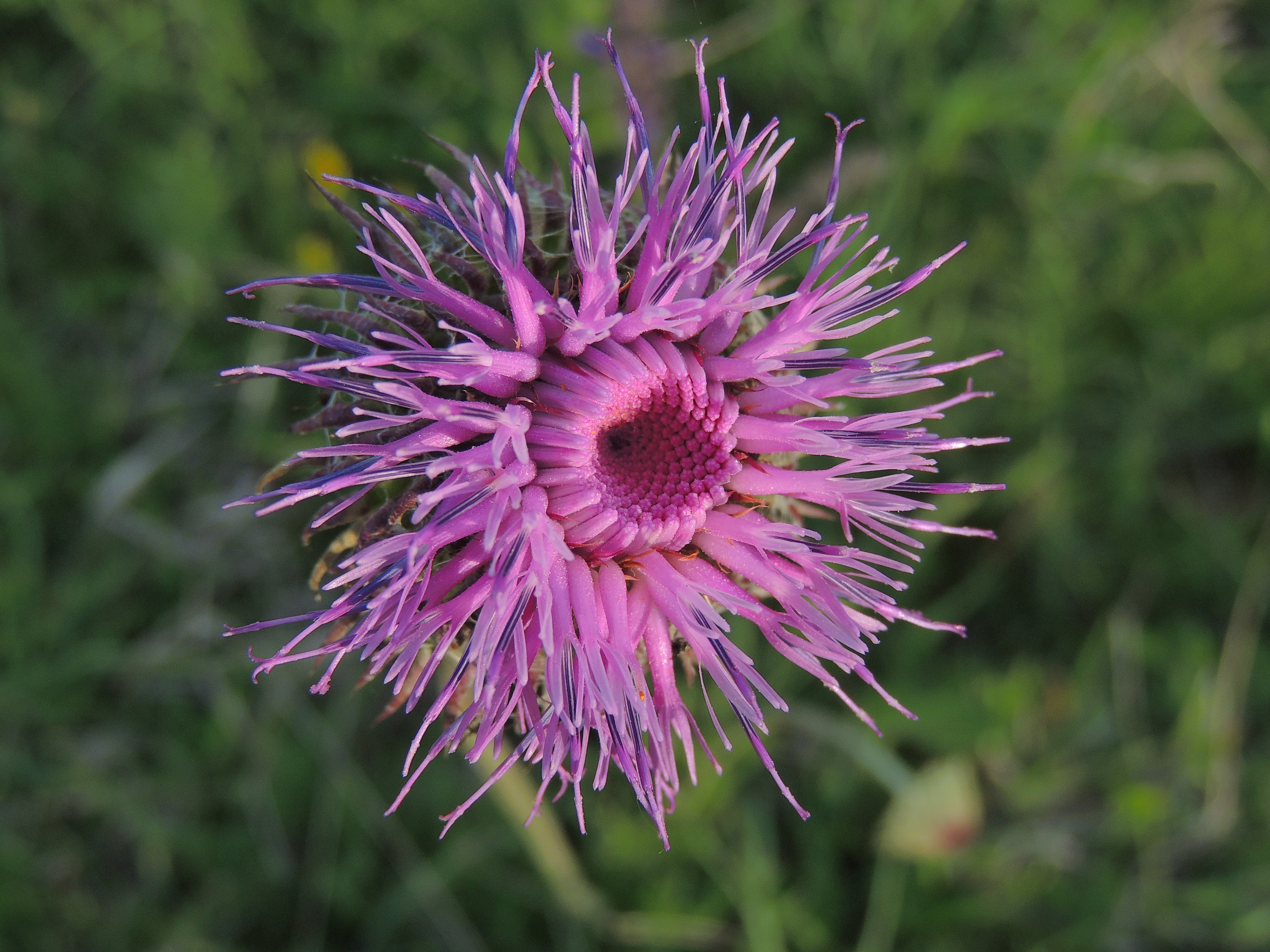
- Jurinea mollis from Romania

Scientific classification
- Kingdom: Plantae
- Clade: Tracheophytes
- Clade: Angiosperms
- Clade: Eudicots
- Clade: Asterids
- Order: Asterales
- Family: Asteraceae
- Subfamily: Carduoideae
- Tribe: Cardueae
- Subtribe: Saussureinae
- Genus: Jurinea; Cass.

Synonyms
- List: Aegopordon Boiss.; Derderia Jaub.& Spach; Himalaiella Raab-Straube; Hyalochaete Dittrich & Rech.f.; Jurinella Jaub. & Spach; Lipschitziella Kamelin; Microlonchoides P.Candargy; Outreya Jaub. & Spach; Perplexia Iljin, not validly publ.; Pilostemon Iljin; Stechmannia DC.; Tulakenia Raf.

= Jurinea =

Genus of flowering plants

Jurinea is a genus of flowering plants in the family Asteraceae.

The species are native to Europe, Asia, and northwestern Africa.

== Species ==
The following species are recognised in the genus Jurinea:

- Jurinea abolinii Iljin
- Jurinea abramovii Regel & Herder
- Jurinea adenocarpa Schrenk ex Fisch. & C.A.Mey.
- Jurinea akinfievii Nemirova
- Jurinea alata Cass.
- Jurinea albescens (DC.) N.Garcia, Herrando & Susanna
- Jurinea albicaulis Bunge
- Jurinea albovii Galushko & Nemirova
- Jurinea algida Iljin
- Jurinea almaatensis Iljin
- Jurinea alpigena K.Koch
- Jurinea altaica Iljin
- Jurinea ancyrensis Bornm.
- Jurinea androssovii Iljin
- Jurinea annae Sosn.
- Jurinea antoninae Iljin
- Jurinea antunowi C.Winkl.
- Jurinea arachnoidea Bunge
- Jurinea armeniaca Sosn.
- Jurinea asperifolia Iljin
- Jurinea atropurpurea C.Winkl. ex Iljin
- Jurinea aucheriana DC.
- Jurinea auriculata (DC.) N.Garcia, Herrando & Susanna
- Jurinea baissunensis Iljin
- Jurinea baldschuanica C.Winkl.
- Jurinea bellidioides Boiss.
- Jurinea berardioides (Boiss.) O.Hoffm.
- Jurinea bipinnatifida C.Winkl.
- Jurinea blanda (M.Bieb.) C.A.Mey.
- Jurinea bobrovii Iljin
- Jurinea bocconei Guss.
- Jurinea boreoiranica Mirtadz. & Naderi
- Jurinea botschantzevii Iljin
- Jurinea brachypappa Nemirova
- Jurinea bracteata Regel & Schmalh.
- Jurinea brevicaulis Boiss.
- Jurinea breviscapa O.Schwarz
- Jurinea bucharica C.Winkl.
- Jurinea bulgarica Velen.
- Jurinea bungei Boiss.
- Jurinea cadmea Boiss.
- Jurinea caespitans Iljin
- Jurinea caespitosa C.Winkl. ex O.Fedtsch. & B.Fedtsch.
- Jurinea calcarea Klokov
- Jurinea capusii Franch.
- Jurinea carduicephala Iljin
- Jurinea carduiformis (Jaub. & Spach) Boiss.
- Jurinea cartaliniana Boiss.
- Jurinea cataonica Boiss. & Hausskn.
- Jurinea catharinae Iljin
- Jurinea cephalopoda Iljin
- Jurinea ceratocarpa (Decne.) Benth. ex C.B.Clarke
- Jurinea chaetocarpa (Ledeb.) Ledeb.
- Jurinea chenopodiifolia (Klatt) N.Garcia, Herrando & Susanna
- Jurinea chitralica (Duthie) N.Garcia, Herrando & Susanna
- Jurinea ciscaucasica (Sosn.) Iljin
- Jurinea consanguinea DC.
- Jurinea cordata Boiss. & Hausskn.
- Jurinea coronopifolia Sommier & Levier
- Jurinea cretacea Bunge
- Jurinea creticola Iljin
- Jurinea crispa (Vaniot) N.Garcia, Herrando & Susanna
- Jurinea cyanoides (L.) Rchb.
- Jurinea cypria Boiss.
- Jurinea czilikinoana Iljin
- Jurinea darvasica Iljin
- Jurinea deltoidea (DC.) N.Garcia, Herrando & Susanna
- Jurinea densisquamea Iljin
- Jurinea derderioides C.Winkl.
- Jurinea dobrogensis Nyár.
- Jurinea dolomitica Galushko
- Jurinea dshungarica (Rubtzov) Iljin
- Jurinea dumulosa Boiss.
- Jurinea eduardi-regelii Iljin
- Jurinea efeae N.Aksoy
- Jurinea elbursensis (Wagenitz) Tscherneva
- Jurinea elegans Steven ex DC.
- Jurinea elegantissima Iljin
- Jurinea eriobasis DC.
- Jurinea ewersmannii Bunge
- Jurinea eximia Tekutj.
- Jurinea fedtschenkoana Iljin
- Jurinea ferganica Iljin
- Jurinea filicifolia Boiss.
- Jurinea filifolia (Regel & Schmalh.) C.G.A.Winkl.
- Jurinea fontqueri Cuatrec.
- Jurinea frigida Boiss.
- Jurinea gabrieliae Bornm.
- Jurinea galushkoi Nemirova
- Jurinea gilesii (Hemsl.) N.Garcia, Herrando & Susanna
- Jurinea gilliatii Turrill
- Jurinea giviensis Mirtadz.
- Jurinea glycacantha DC.
- Jurinea gorodkovii Iljin
- Jurinea gracilis Iljin
- Jurinea grossheimii Sosn.
- Jurinea grumosa Iljin
- Jurinea hamulosa Rubtzov
- Jurinea helichrysifolia Popov ex Iljin
- Jurinea heteromalla (D.Don) N.Garcia, Herrando & Susanna
- Jurinea heterophylla (Jaub. & Spach) Boiss.
- Jurinea humilis (Desf.) DC.
- Jurinea iljinii Grossh.
- Jurinea impressinervis Iljin
- Jurinea inuloides Boiss. & Hausskn.
- Jurinea jucunda (C.Winkl.) Sennikov
- Jurinea kamelinii Iljin
- Jurinea kapelkini O.Fedtsch.
- Jurinea karabugasica Iljin
- Jurinea karatavica Iljin
- Jurinea karategina (Lipsky) O.Fedtsch.
- Jurinea kaschgarica Iljin
- Jurinea kazachstanica Iljin
- Jurinea kemahensis B.Doğan, Kandemir & A.Duran
- Jurinea khorassanica Joharchi & Mirtadz.
- Jurinea kilaea Azn.
- Jurinea kirghisorum Janisch.
- Jurinea kitanovii Iljin
- Jurinea knorringiana Iljin
- Jurinea kokanica Iljin
- Jurinea komarovii Iljin
- Jurinea kopetensis Rech.f.
- Jurinea korotkovae Turak. & F.O.Khass.
- Jurinea krascheninnikovii Iljin
- Jurinea kultiassovii Iljin
- Jurinea kuraminensis Iljin
- Jurinea kyzylkyrensis Kamelin & Tscherneva
- Jurinea lanipes Rupr.
- Jurinea lasiopoda Trautv.
- Jurinea ledebourii Bunge
- Jurinea leptoloba DC.
- Jurinea leptophylla (Hemsl.) N.Garcia, Herrando & Susanna
- Jurinea levieri Albov
- Jurinea lipskyi Iljin
- Jurinea lithophila Rubtzov
- Jurinea longifolia DC.
- Jurinea ludmilae Iljin
- Jurinea lydiae Iljin
- Jurinea macranthodia Iljin
- Jurinea macrocephala DC.
- Jurinea mallophora Rech.f. & Köie
- Jurinea mamillarioides Iljin
- Jurinea mariae Pavlov
- Jurinea maxima C.Winkl.
- Jurinea meda Bornm.
- Jurinea merxmuelleri Podlech
- Jurinea mesopotamica Hand.-Mazz.
- Jurinea micevskii Stevan., Matevski & Kit Tan
- Jurinea michelsonii Iljin
- Jurinea microcephala Boiss.
- Jurinea mobayenii Ghahr. & Mirtadz.
- Jurinea modesta Boiss.
- Jurinea modesti Czerep.
- Jurinea mollis (L.) Rchb.
- Jurinea mollissima Klokov
- Jurinea mongolica Maxim.
- Jurinea monocephala Aitch. & Hemsl.
- Jurinea monticola Iljin
- Jurinea moschus (Hablitz) Bobrov
- Jurinea mugodsharica Iljin
- Jurinea multicaulis DC.
- Jurinea multiceps Iljin
- Jurinea multiflora (L.) B.Fedtsch.
- Jurinea multiloba Iljin
- Jurinea nargalensis Iljin
- Jurinea narynensis Kamelin & Tscherneva
- Jurinea natmataungensis (Fujikawa) Fujikawa
- Jurinea neicevii (Kožuharov) Greuter
- Jurinea nevskii F.O.Khass.
- Jurinea nivea C.Winkl.
- Jurinea olgae Regel & Schmalh.
- Jurinea orientalis (Iljin) Iljin
- Jurinea peguensis (C.B.Clarke) N.Garcia, Herrando & Susanna
- Jurinea persimilis Iljin
- Jurinea perula-orientis C.Jeffrey ex Grey-Wilson
- Jurinea pineticola Iljin
- Jurinea pinnata (Pers.) DC.
- Jurinea poacea Iljin
- Jurinea polycephala Formánek
- Jurinea polyclonos DC.
- Jurinea pontica Hausskn. & Freyn
- Jurinea popovii Iljin
- Jurinea praetermissa Galushko & Nemirova
- Jurinea prasinophylla Rech.f.
- Jurinea prokhanovii Nemirova
- Jurinea propinqua Iljin
- Jurinea proteoides Boiss. & Hausskn.
- Jurinea psammophila Iljin
- Jurinea pseudoiljinii Galushko & Nemirova
- Jurinea pteroclada Iljin
- Jurinea pulchella DC.
- Jurinea pumila Albov
- Jurinea radians Boiss.
- Jurinea ramosissima DC.
- Jurinea ramulosa Boiss. & Hausskn.
- Jurinea rhizomatoidea Iljin
- Jurinea robusta Schrenk
- Jurinea roegneri K.Koch
- Jurinea rosulata Klatt
- Jurinea ruprechtii Boiss.
- Jurinea salicifolia Gruner
- Jurinea sangardensis Iljin
- Jurinea schachimordanica Iljin
- Jurinea schischkiniana Iljin
- Jurinea semenovii (Herder) C.Winkl.
- Jurinea serratuloides Iljin
- Jurinea shahrestanica Rech.f.
- Jurinea sharifiana Rech.f. & Esfand.
- Jurinea sintenisii Bornm.
- Jurinea sosnowskyi Grossh.
- Jurinea spectabilis Fisch. & C.A.Mey.
- Jurinea spiridonovii Iljin
- Jurinea spissa Iljin
- Jurinea squarrosa Fisch. & C.A.Mey.
- Jurinea staehelinae (DC.) Boiss.
- Jurinea stenocalathia Rech.f.
- Jurinea stenophylla Iljin
- Jurinea stoechadifolia (M.Bieb.) DC.
- Jurinea subhastata Pančić
- Jurinea suffruticosa Regel
- Jurinea suidunensis Korsh.
- Jurinea tadshikistanica Iljin
- Jurinea tapetodes Iljin
- Jurinea taygetea Halácsy
- Jurinea tenuiloba Bunge
- Jurinea thianschanica Regel & Schmalh.
- Jurinea tortisquamea Iljin
- Jurinea tortumensis A.Duran & B.Doğan
- Jurinea transhyrcana Iljin
- Jurinea transsylvanica (Spreng.) Simonk.
- Jurinea transuralensis Iljin
- Jurinea trautvetteriana Regel & Schmalh.
- Jurinea trifurcata Iljin
- Jurinea tschernevae Tojibaev & Turginov
- Jurinea turcica B.Doğan & A.Duran
- Jurinea tzar-ferdinandi Davidov
- Jurinea venusta Iljin
- Jurinea viciosoi Pau
- Jurinea winkleri Iljin
- Jurinea woronowii Iljin
- Jurinea xeranthemoides Iljin
- Jurinea xerophytica Iljin
- Jurinea yakla (C.B.Clarke) N.Garcia, Herrando & Susanna
- Jurinea zakirovii Iljin

== Bibliography ==
- Boissier, Pierre Edmond (1846). Diagnoses plantarum Orientalium novarum. 1. Leipzig: Lipsiae.
- Jaubert, Hippolyte François; Spach, Édouard (1843). Illustrationes Plantarum Orientalium (in Italian and Latin). Vol. 1. Parisiis: apud Roret bibliopolam.
- Ling, Yong (1965). "Genera Nova vel Minus Cognita Familiae Compositarum, I. Vladimiria Ilj., Diplazoptilon". Acta Phytotaxonomica Sinica. 10 (1).
- Soják, Jiří (1982). Sborn. Nár. Muz. Praze. Vol. 1–2.
