= Akna (Inuit mythology) =

Inuit deity associated with fertility and childbirth

In Inuit mythology, Akna ("mother") is a goddess of fertility and childbirth.
