= Lake Akna (Armavir) =

Lake in Armavir, Armenia

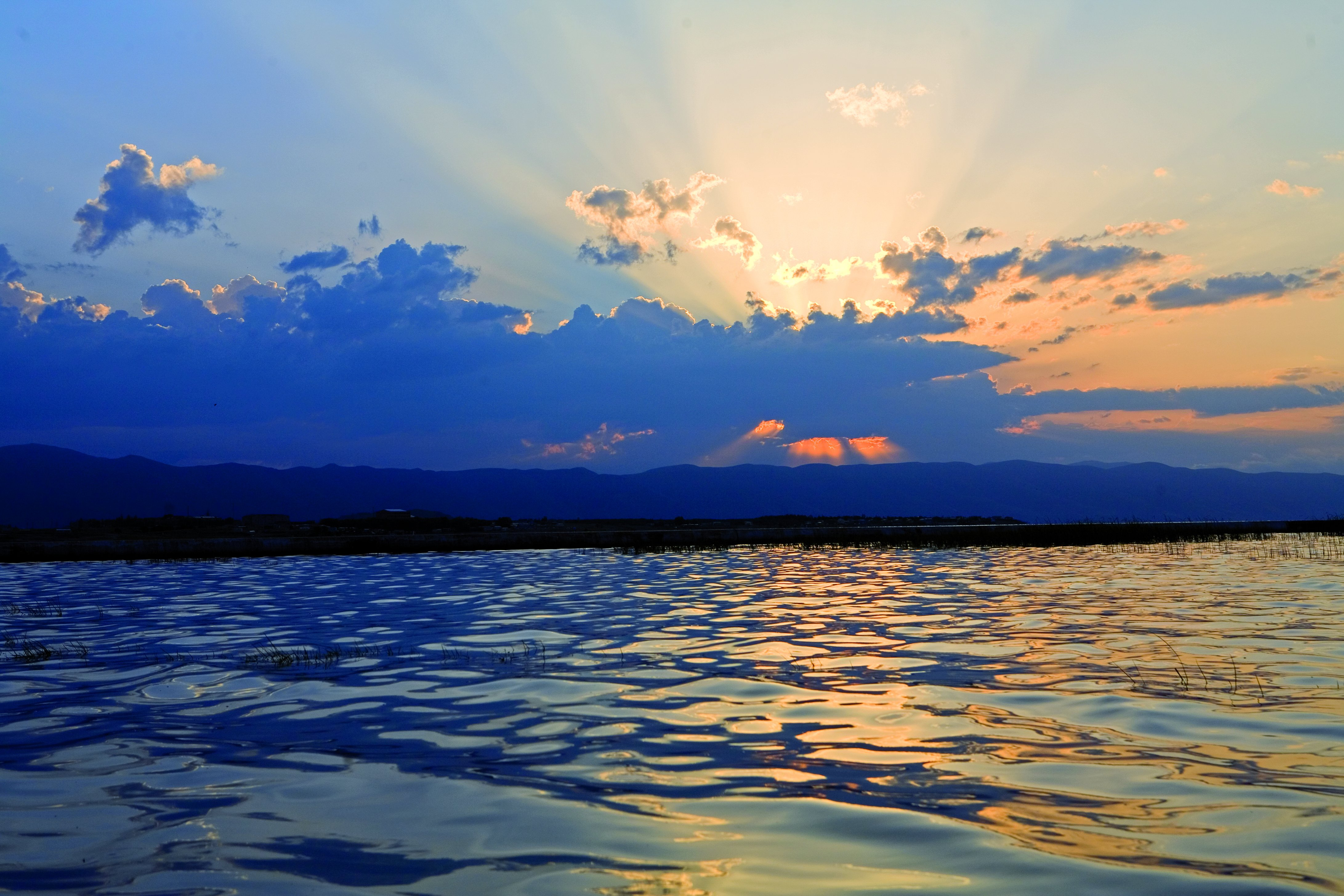

- Location within Armenia Location within Caucasus Mountains
- Interactive map of Lake Akna
- Location: Armavir Province, Armenia
- Coordinates: 40°8′40″N 44°10′8″E
- Basin countries: Armenia
- Max. length: 0.3 km (0.19 mi)
- Max. width: 0.2 km (0.12 mi)
- Surface area: 0.07 km^{2} (0.027 sq mi)
- Surface elevation: 850 m (2,790 ft)
- Settlements: Aknalich

Lake Akna (Armenian: Ակնա) is a small lake located in the Ararat plain west of Ejmiatsin in Armenia. The area of the lake is 0.07 km^{2} (0.027 sq mi), while its maximum depth is 9.4 meters.

== See also ==
- Lake Sevan
- Ararat plain
