= Lake Akna (Kotayk) =

Crater lake in Armenia

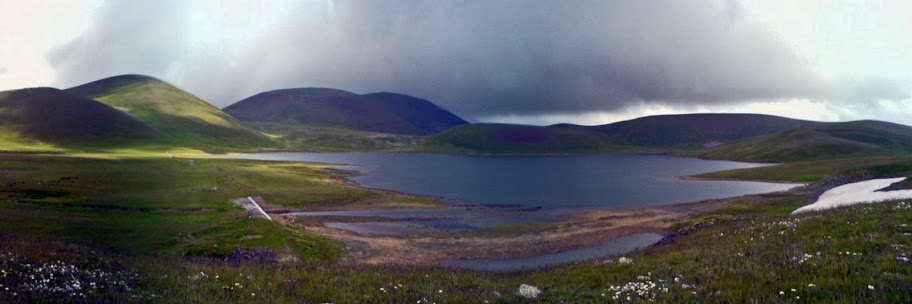

- Location within Armenia Location within Caucasus Mountains
- Location: Kotayk Province, Armenia
- Coordinates: 40°16′34″N 44°55′29″E
- Basin countries: Armenia
- Surface area: 0.5 km^{2} (0.19 sq mi)
- Surface elevation: 3,032 m (9,948 ft)

Lake Akna (Armenian: Ակնա;) is a crater lake located in the Gegham mountains of eastern Kotayk Province of Armenia.

== See also ==
- Lake Sevan
- Geghama mountains
