= Bartsrashen =

Bartsrashen or Bardzrashen may refer to:

- Bardzrashen, Ararat, Armenia
- Bardzrashen, Shirak, Armenia
- Bitlidzha, Armenia
