= Bitlidzha =

- Location within Armenia
- Coordinates: 40°07′10″N 44°36′15″E
- Country: Armenia
- Marz (Province): Yerevan
- Time zone: UTC+4 ( )
  - Summer (DST): UTC+5 ( )

Bitlidzha (also, Bartsrashen) was a town in the Yerevan Province of Armenia; it is now in ruins.
