= Bardzrashen, Shirak =

Bardzrashen Բարձրաշեն
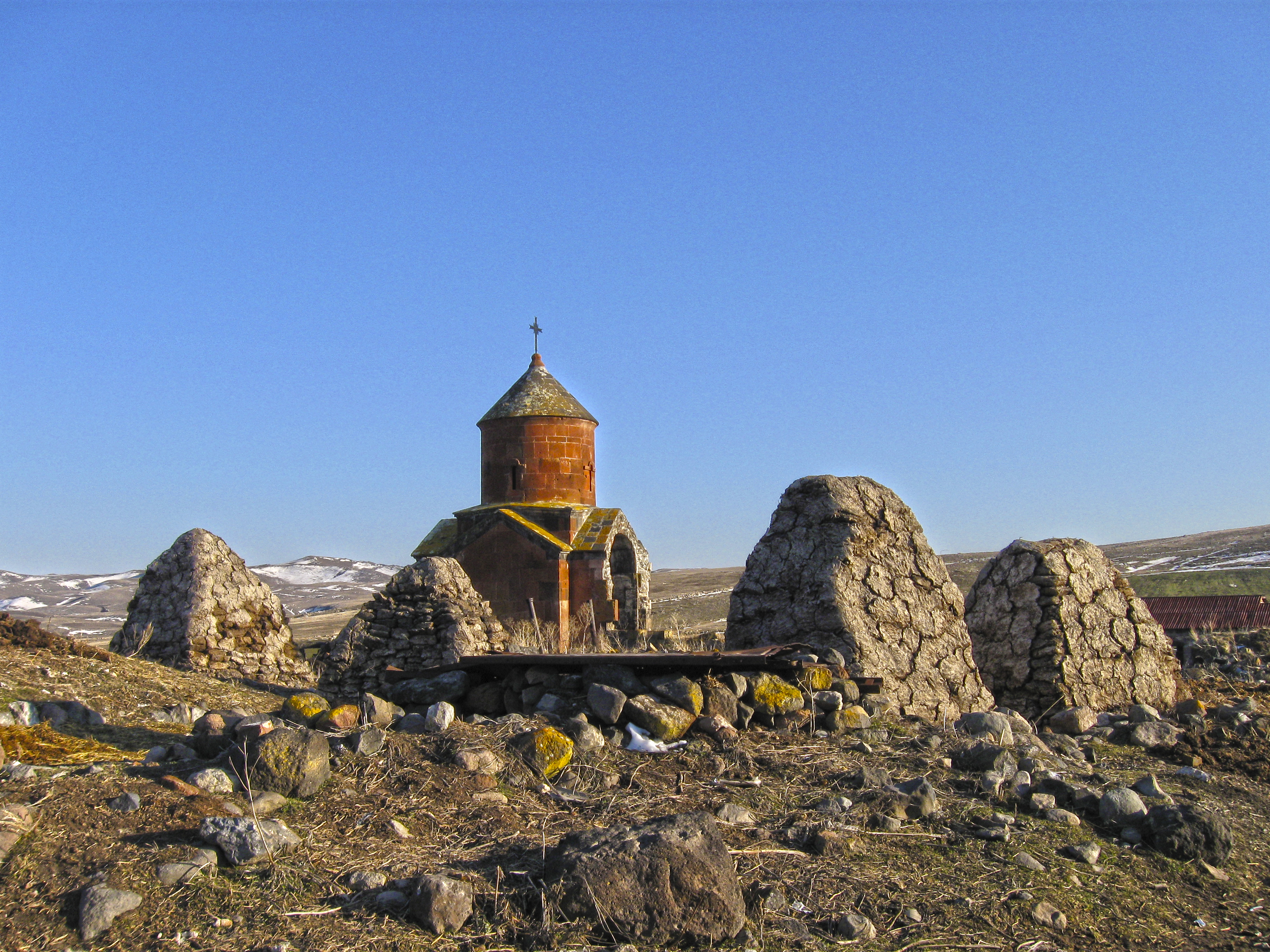

- Location within Armenia Location within Shirak
- Coordinates: 40°36′N 43°44′E
- Country: Armenia
- Province: Shirak
- Municipality: Ani

Population (2011)
  - Total: 40
- Time zone: UTC+4

Bardzrashen (Armenian: Բարձրաշեն) is a village in the Ani Municipality of the Shirak Province of Armenia. It belongs to the municipal community of Maralik.

== Demographics ==
The population of the village since 1873 is as follows:

Historical population
Year	Pop.	±% p.a.
1873	336	—
1914	630	+1.55%
1922	505	−2.73%
1939	793	+2.69%
1970	327	−2.82%
1979	338	+0.37%
2001	64	−7.29%
2011	40	−4.59%
