= Roads in Armenia =

Roads in Armenia serve as the main transport network in Armenia. With an underdeveloped railway network, principally due to its difficult terrain, the road system is of vital importance for the development of the country. Its role is important in both national and international traffic.

The total length of the Armenian road network is 8,140 km (5,060 mi), 96.7% of which is asphalted. For every 1,000 km^{2} (390 sq mi) of national territory, there are 258 km (160 mi) of roads. Armenia is a member of the International Road Transport Union and the TIR Convention.

== Highways of national importance ==
The first roads as we conceive them in a modern perception, appeared in Armenia in the 19th century.

The main roads in the country are identified using the Armenian letter Մ ("M"):

- E117 E691 AH81 AH82 Մ1 Yerevan - Ashtarak - Gyumri - Bavra ( (Georgia (country))). Length: 173.7 km (107.9 mi)
- E002 E117 AH81 AH82 Մ2 Yerevan - Ararat - Yeraskh ( (Azerbaijan)) - Kapan - Meghri ( (Iran) Road 12) - Kilit Border ( (Azerbaijan). Length: 384.3 km (238.8 mi)
- E117 AH81 Մ3 Margara ( (Turkey) D.977) - Ashtarak - Vanadzor - Dzoramut ( (Georgia (country))). Length: 183.7 km (114.1 mi)
- AH83 Մ4 Yerevan - Hrazdan - Sevan - Azatamut ( (Azerbaijan))
- Մ5 Yerevan - Armavir - Border crossing with Turkey (closed due to political reasons)
- E001 Մ6 Vanadzor - Bagratashen ( (Georgia (country)))
- AH82 Մ7 Vanadzor - Gyumri - Akhurik ( (Turkey) D.060).
- Մ8 Vanadzor - Dilijan
- Մ9 Talin - Karakert - Bagaran
- Մ10 Sevan - Martuni - Yeghegnadzor
- Մ11 Martuni - Vardenis - ( (Azerbaijan)) - Drmbon
- Մ12 Goris - ( (Azerbaijan)) -Stepanakert
- Մ13 Angeghakot - Nakhchivan AR border ( (Azerbaijan))
- Մ14 Tsovagyugh - Vardenis
- Մ15 Yerevan bypass
- Մ16 Haghtanak - Azatamut
- E002 AH81 Մ17 Kapan - Shikahogh - Meghri

== Highways of regional importance ==
These roads are a level below Մ level roads, and connect main highways to communities across the country. There are 84 numbered roads of this class in the country, which are designated using the letter Հ ("H"). In total there are 1969 km roads of this class.

=== 1 to 10 ===
- Հ1 Balahovit - Jraber -Kaghsi - Hrazdan
- Հ2 Abovyan - Arzni - Nor Geghi
- Հ3 Yerevan - Garni - Geghard
- Հ4 Yerevan - Yeghvard - Aragyugh - Hartavan
- Հ5 Nor Geghi - Argel - Arzakan ( - Aghveran) - Hrazdan
- Հ6 Abovyan - Nor Geghi - Yeghvard - Nor Yerznka
- Հ7 Karenis - Charentsavan - Fantan
- Հ8 Ayntap - Berkanush - Artashat - Vosketap - Aygavan - Ararat
- Հ9 Berkanush - Dvin
- Հ10 Vosketap - Vedi - Lanjar

=== 11 to 20 ===
- Հ11 Pokr Vedi - Lusarat ( - Khor Virap) - Yeghegnavan - Ararat
- Հ12 Ayntap - Masis - Ranchpar - Araks - Jrarat
- Հ13 Vagharshapat - Masis - Marmarashen
- Հ14 Yerevan (Charbakh Metro) - Masis
- Հ15 Armavir - Argavand - Margara
- Հ16 Metsamor - Metsamor NPP - Aknalich
- Հ17 Armavir - Myasnikyan - Karakert
- Հ18 Hushakert - Vanand
- Հ19 Ashtarak - Oshakan - Dasht
- Հ20 Oshakan - Agarak ( - Tegher) - Byurakan - ( - Amberd) - Lake Kari

=== 21 to 30 ===
- Հ21 Shirakavan - Horom - Artik - Alagyaz
- Հ22 Dsegh - Marts
- Հ23 Pushkino ( Tunnel bypass)
- Հ24 Gyulagarak - Kurtan - Dsegh
- Հ25 Haghpat
- Հ26 Conccurent with
- Հ27 Meghradzor - Margahovit
- Հ28 Jrarat ( - Teghenis Sports Complex) - Meghradzor - Hankavan
- Հ29 Sevan - Tsaghkunk - Zovaber - Jrarat
- Հ30 Haghartsin ( - Gosh) - Chambarak - ( (Azerbaijan) Artsvashen) - Drakhtik

=== 31 to 40 ===
- Հ31 Vardaghbyur - Tashir
- Հ32 Gyumri - Kaps - Amasia - Tsoghamargh
- Հ33 Stepanavan - Yaghdan - Mghart
- Հ34 Stepanavan - Privolnoye - Akhkerpi ( (Georgia (country)))
- Հ35 Sanahin - Odzun - Aygehat - Dzoragyugh
- Հ36 Ijevan - Navur - Berd - Aygepar
- Հ37 Aygehovit - Vazashen - Paravakar - Aygepar
- Հ38 Ttujur - Navur
- Հ39 Gavar
- Հ40 Areni - Khachik - Gnishik - Agarakadzor

=== 41 to 50 ===
- Հ41 Areni - Noravank
- Հ42 Vayk - Zaritap - Bardzruni
- Հ43 Artavan - Gndevaz - Jermuk - ( (Azerbaijan)) - Kalbajar - Qamishli
- Հ44 Artavan - Jermuk
- Հ45 Shaki - Sisian - Dastakert - Tsghuni
- Հ46 Goris ( - Goris Airport) - Tatev - Aghvani - Kapan
- Հ47 Tsav - Shishkert
- Հ48 Yeghegnadzor - Vernashen - Gladzor
- E002 AH81Հ49 Nrnadzor - ( (Azerbaijan)) - Aghband - Mincivan/Mijnavan - Shukurbeyli/Ishkhan - Marjali/Mardjan ( (Azerbaijan))
- Հ50 Meghri - Meghri Airstrip - Agarak Copper and Molybdenum Mine

=== 51 to 60 ===
- Հ51 Teghut -Haghartsin Monastery
- Հ52 Yeghegnadzor - Malishka
- Հ53 Semyonovka - Tsovagyugh
- Հ54 Baghanis - Voskepar
- Հ55 Hrazdan - Tsaghkadzor Olympic Sports Complex ( - Tsaghkadzor ski resort)
- Հ56 Mughni - Ohanavan
- Հ57 Artashavan - Saghmosavan
- Հ58 Alaverdi - Jiliza
- Հ59 Petrovka - Sarchapet
- Հ60 Tashor - Metsavan - Dzyunashogh

=== 61 to 70 ===
- Հ61 Sarigyugh - Berkaber
- Հ62 Noyemberyan - Dovegh
- Հ63 Baghanis - Koti - Barekamavan
- Հ64 Berd - Norashen - Artsvaberd - Chinari
- Հ65 Norashen - Movses
- Հ66 Tavshut - Ardenis - Berdashen - Shaghik
- Հ67 Berdashen - Amasia
- Հ68 Vardaghbyur - Pokr Sariar - Saralanj
- Հ69 Artik - Harich
- Հ70 Marts - Atan

=== 71 to 80 ===
- Հ71 Lori Berd - Lori Berd Fortress
- Հ72 Shgharshik - Vahanavank
- Հ73 Dilijan - Lake Parz
- Հ74 Ishkhanasar - Sisian
- Հ75 Karakert - Bagravan - Isahakyan - Shirakavan - Gyumri
- Հ76 Aknalich - Taronik -Metsamor Castle
- Հ77 Vagharshapat
- Հ78 Sevan Island
- Հ79 Stepanavan Airport
- Հ80 Sisian Airstrip

=== 81 to 85 ===
- Հ81 Talin - Tsamakasar - Nor Artik - Bagravan
- Հ82 Meghri
- Հ83 Artik - Pemzashen - Dzorakap/Maralik
- Հ84 Sevan
- Հ85 Hrazdan

== Highways of local importance ==
These roads are a level below H level roads, and connect main and regional highways to communities across the country. The letter by which these roads are numbered is "T", "Տ" in Armenian, standing for Տեղական, meaning Local.

== International links ==
Armenia connects to European road networks via the International E-road network through various routes such as; European route E117, European route E691, European route E001 and European route E60. Armenia also connects to the Asian Highway Network through routes AH81, AH82 and AH83.

== See also ==
- International E-road network
- Road signs in Armenia
- Road Transport
- Transport in Armenia
- Transport in Europe
