= Horom =

Horom may refer to:

- Horom, Armenia
  - Horom Citadel
- Horom language
