= Aylanlu =

Aylanlu may refer to:

- Davtashen, Aragatsotn, Armenia - formerly Aylanlu
- Khoronk, Armenia - formerly Nerkin Aylanlu
- Tsaghkunk, Armavir, Armenia - formerly Verin Aylanlu
