= Tsaghkunk =

Tsaghkunk or Tsaghkunk’ or Tsakhkunk or Tzaghkunk or Tsaghkunq may refer to:

- Tsaghkunk, Armavir, Armenia
- Tsaghkunk, Gegharkunik, Armenia
