= Orom =

OROM or Orom may refer to:

- Option ROM, in PCs
- Optical read only memory, a type of computer memory
- Orom (Kanjiža), a village in Serbia
- Horom, Armenia, also called Orom
- Oromë, a fictional character.
