= Shirakavan, Armenia =

Shirakavan, Armenia may refer to:

- Shirakavan (ancient city), medieval Armenian city
- Shirakavan (municipality), Armenian village
