= Sergey Yaghubyan =

Sergey Anushavan Yaghubyan (Armenian: Սերգեյ Յաղուբյան; 16 September 1925 – 19 May 2011) known as Sergey Yaghubyan was an Armenian politician of the Armenian Revolutionary Federation (ARF).

Sergey Yaghubyan was born with the name Frounze (Armenian: Ֆրունզ 16 September 1925) in Horom, Shirak Province of Armenia, to Armenian immigrants Anushavan Yaghubyan (from Eleşkirt district of Ağrı Province in Turkey) and Khanoum Yaghubyan.

He was a member of the Armenian Revolutionary Federation Central Committee from 13 May 1940 and a member of the ARF Bureau.
