= State road D.977 (Turkey) =

D.977

Route information
- Length: 6 km (3.7 mi)

Major junctions
- North end: Մ3 at the Armenian border near Alican (Closed)
- South end: D.080 near Karakoyunlu

Location
- Country: Turkey

Highway system
- Highways in Turkey; Motorways; List; State Highways; List

The D.977 is a 6 km (3.7 mi) long state road in Iğdır Province in Turkey. The route runs from the closed border checkpoint with Armenia, south to the intersection with the D.080. The route originally continued into Armenia, via the Մ3, until 3 April 1993 when Turkey and Armenia closed their borders. Since the border closure, the road has continued to serve small settlements in the vicinity.
