= Azatamut =

Azatamut Ազատամուտ
- Location within Armenia Location within Tavush
- Coordinates: 40°58′33″N 45°11′53″E
- Country: Armenia
- Province: Tavush
- Municipality: Ijevan
- Elevation: 650 m (2,130 ft)

Population (2011)
  - Total: 2,513
- Time zone: UTC+4 (AMT)

Azatamut (Armenian: Ազատամուտ) is a village in the Ijevan Municipality of the Tavush Province of Armenia.
