= Baghanis =

Armenian village near the border with Azerbaijan

Baghanis Բաղանիս
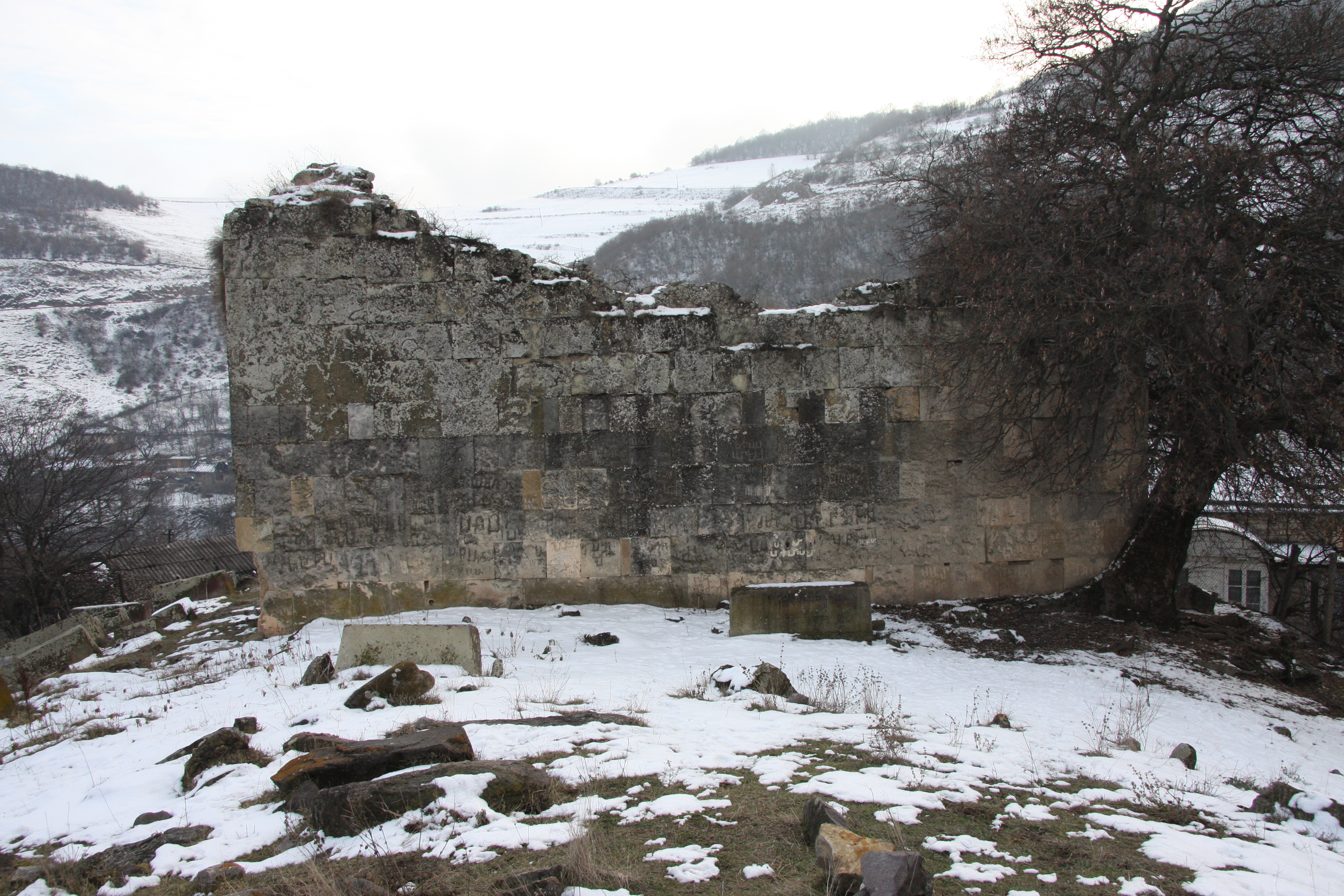
- Ruins of St. Astvatsatsin Church in Baghanis

- Location within Armenia Location within Tavush
- Coordinates: 41°07′N 45°04′E
- Country: Armenia
- Province: Tavush
- Municipality: Noyemberyan
- Elevation: 900 m (3,000 ft)

Population (2011)
  - Total: 893
  - Estimate (2019): 800
- Time zone: UTC+4 (AMT)

Baghanis (Armenian: Բաղանիս) is a rural village in northeastern Armenia, near the country's border with Azerbaijan. Administratively, it is part of Noyemberyan Municipality in Tavush Province. Due to tensions between Armenia and Azerbaijan arising from the Nagorno-Karabakh conflict, Baghanis has occasionally received gunfire from the Azerbaijani side of the border.

== History ==
Baghanis lies only a few kilometers from the Armenia–Azerbaijan border, making it one of Armenia's most vulnerable settlements in regard to cross-border skirmishes caused by escalations of the Nagorno-Karabakh conflict. The village's proximity to Azerbaijani military positions has led to occasional incidents of stray gunfire hitting the village over the years, with bullet holes visible in many buildings. In response, a number of homes adjacent to the border have been fortified, and a classroom in the village school was converted into a safe room. A new kindergarten was built in 2019 as far from the border as possible.

== Economy ==
Baghanis is an agricultural community, with the main economic activities being farming and cattle-breeding. Many areas near the border remain uncultivated due to security concerns, and livestock loss from cross-border gunfire has occurred in the past. Economic opportunities are otherwise limited, as aside from a tobacco-processing factory that employs about 40 people seasonally, most residents rely on small-scale farming for their income.

== Demographics ==
The 2011 Armenian census recorded a population of 893 residents in Baghanis. The Armenian General Benevolent Union estimated in 2019 that Baghanis had about 800 residents remaining.

== Culture ==
Baghanis has a church dedicated to St. Astvatsatsin (Mary, mother of Jesus).
