= Berdashen =

Village in Shirak, Armenia

Berdashen Բերդաշեն
- Location within Armenia Location within Shirak
- Coordinates: 41°03′13″N 43°40′08″E
- Country: Armenia
- Province: Shirak
- Municipality: Amasia

Area
  - Total: 19.7 km^{2} (7.6 sq mi)
- Elevation: 2,020 m (6,630 ft)

Population (2011)
  - Total: 203
  - Density: 11.12/km^{2} (28.8/sq mi)
- Time zone: UTC+4

Berdashen (Armenian: Բերդաշեն) is a village in the Amasia Municipality of the Shirak Province of Armenia. The Statistical Committee of Armenia reported the village's population as 215 in 2018.

== Demographics ==
Historical population
Year	Pop.	±% p.a.
1886	363	—
1897	509	+3.12%
1926	269	−2.18%
1939	414	+3.37%
1964	558	+1.20%
1970	772	+5.56%
1979	871	+1.35%
1989	180	−14.59%
2001	218	+1.61%
2011	203	−0.71%
