= Vardaghbyur =

Vardaghbyur Վարդաղբյուր
- Location within Armenia Location within Shirak
- Coordinates: 40°57′N 43°55′E
- Country: Armenia
- Province: Shirak
- Municipality: Ashotsk

Population (2011)
  - Total: 99
- Time zone: UTC+4
  - Summer (DST): UTC+5

Vardaghbyur (Armenian: Վարդաղբյուր) is a village in the Ashotsk Municipality of the Shirak Province of Armenia.

== Demographics ==
The population of the village since 1873 is as follows:

Historical population
| Year | Pop. | ±% p.a. |
|---|---|---|
| 1873 | 151 | — |
| 1897 | 225 | +1.68% |
| 1926 | 271 | +0.64% |
| 1939 | 383 | +2.70% |
| 1959 | 93 | −6.83% |
| 1970 | 97 | +0.38% |
| 1979 | 70 | −3.56% |
| 1989 | 72 | +0.28% |
| 2001 | 90 | +1.88% |
| 2011 | 99 | +0.96% |
