= Aygepar =

Aygepar Այգեպար
- Location within Armenia Location within Tavush
- Coordinates: 40°56′31″N 45°27′44″E
- Country: Armenia
- Province: Tavush
- Municipality: Berd
- Elevation: 680 m (2,230 ft)

Population (2011)
  - Total: 485
- Time zone: UTC+4 (AMT)

Aygepar (Armenian: Այգեպար) is a village in the Berd Municipality of the Tavush Province of Armenia.
