= Bagravan =

Village in Shirak, Armenia

Bagravan Բագրավան
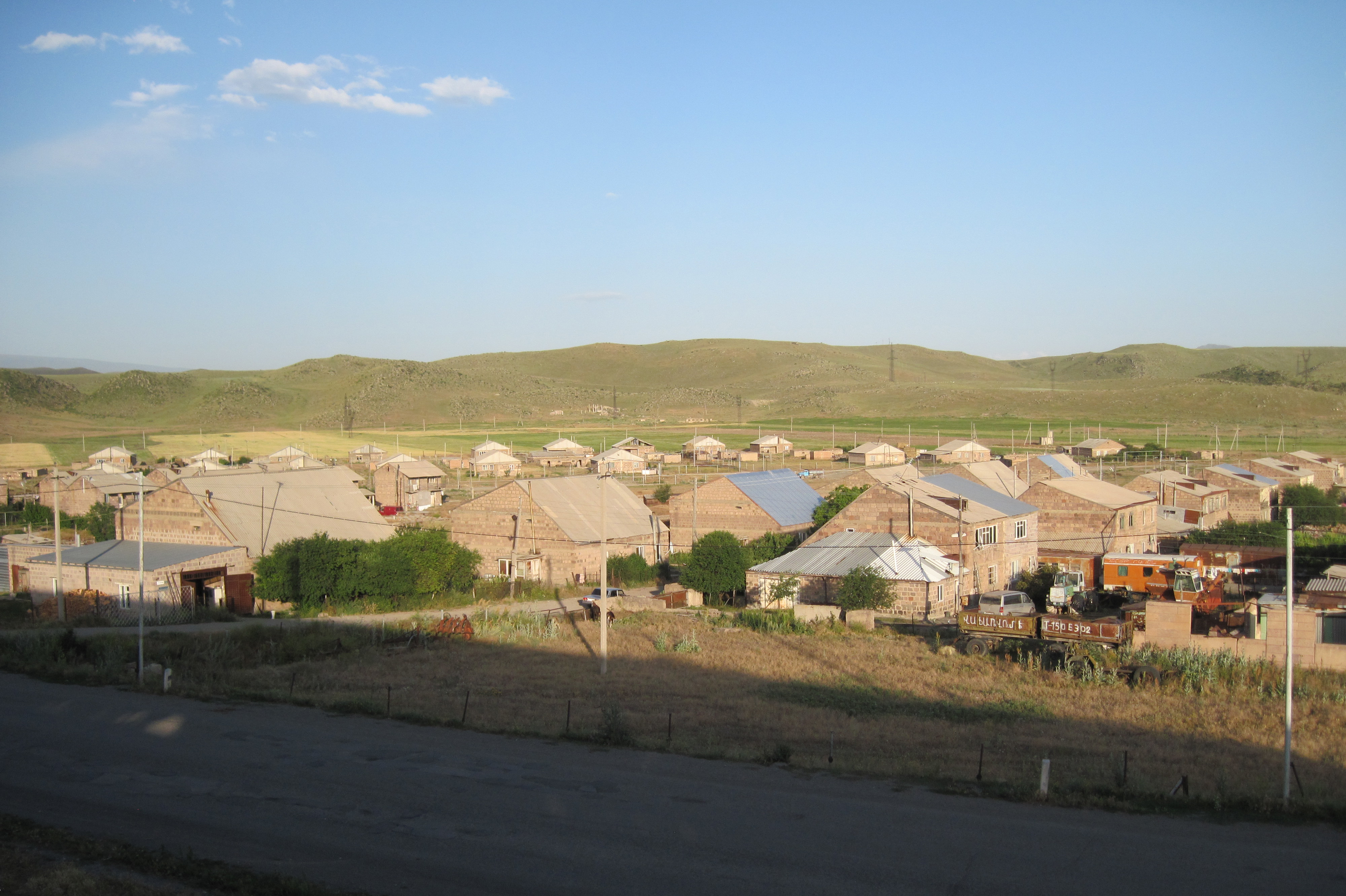

- Location within Armenia Location within Shirak
- Coordinates: 40°28′49″N 43°40′15″E
- Country: Armenia
- Province: Shirak
- Municipality: Ani
- Elevation: 1,460 m (4,790 ft)

Population (2011)
  - Total: 792
- Time zone: UTC+4

Bagravan (Armenian: Բագրավան) is a village in the Ani Municipality of the Shirak Province of Armenia.

== Demographics ==
Historical population
| Year | Pop. | ±% p.a. |
|---|---|---|
| 1873 | 185 | — |
| 1897 | 439 | +3.67% |
| 1926 | 598 | +1.07% |
| 1939 | 948 | +3.61% |
| 1959 | 856 | −0.51% |
| 1970 | 779 | −0.85% |
| 1979 | 816 | +0.52% |
| 2001 | 818 | +0.01% |
| 2011 | 792 | −0.32% |
