= Horom Citadel =

Ancient fortification in Shirak Province, Armenia

Horom Citadel Հոռոմ Բերդ
- Shirak Province, Armenia
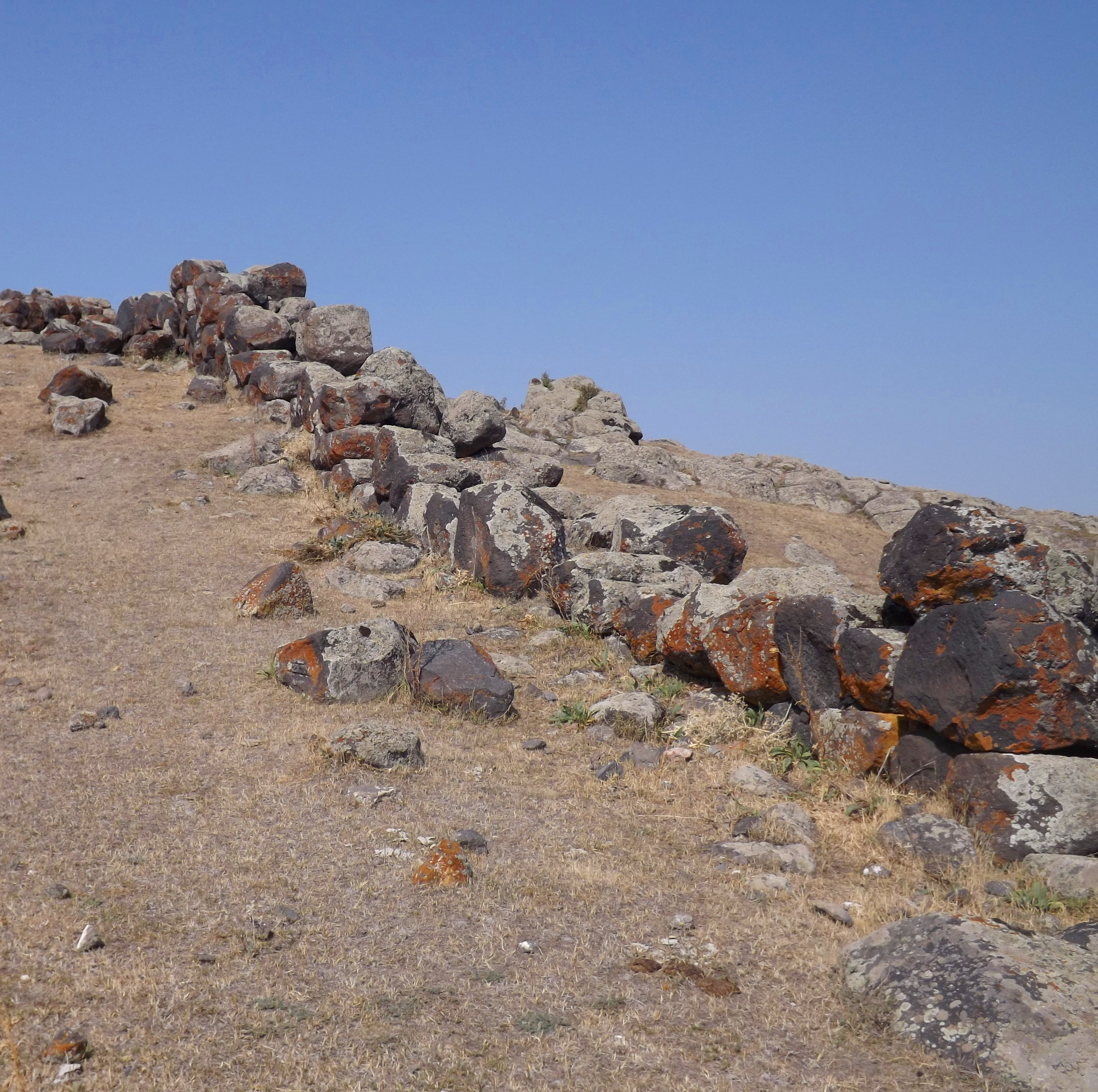
- CastelHorom1 Ruins of the Horom Citadel

Site information
- Type: Citadel
- Condition: Ruins with some well preserved walls. Excavations are underway.

Location
- Shown within Armenia Horom Citadel; Հոռոմ Բերդ (Shirak)
- Coordinates: 40.65655°N 43.902247°E

Site history
- In use: Bronze Age-Urartian eras.
- Materials: Stone

Horom Citadel (Armenian: Հոռոմ Բերդ, also Romanized as Orom and Horrom) is an ancient Bronze Age through Urartian fortification atop two large hills south of the main road and opposite of the dam and Kamut Reservoir. It is about 1 kilometre (0.6 mi) east of the village of Horrom in the Shirak Province of northwestern Armenia. Not far from this location in Ghak and Shvaghtapa are two Urartian cyclopean forts.

== Archaeology ==
Horom is considered to be one of the most impressive archaeological sites in Armenia because of its unique architecture. There are potsherds and obsidian flakes strewn on the surface of the ground. Recent excavations have been underway at the site recently by Armenian and American archaeologists led by Ruben Badalian and Philip Kohl. The teams have uncovered well preserved fortification walls as well as large amounts of cultural artifacts that have given insight into those who once resided at the site.
