= Tsaghkunk, Gegharkunik =

Village in Gegharkunik, Armenia

Tsaghkunk Ծաղկունք
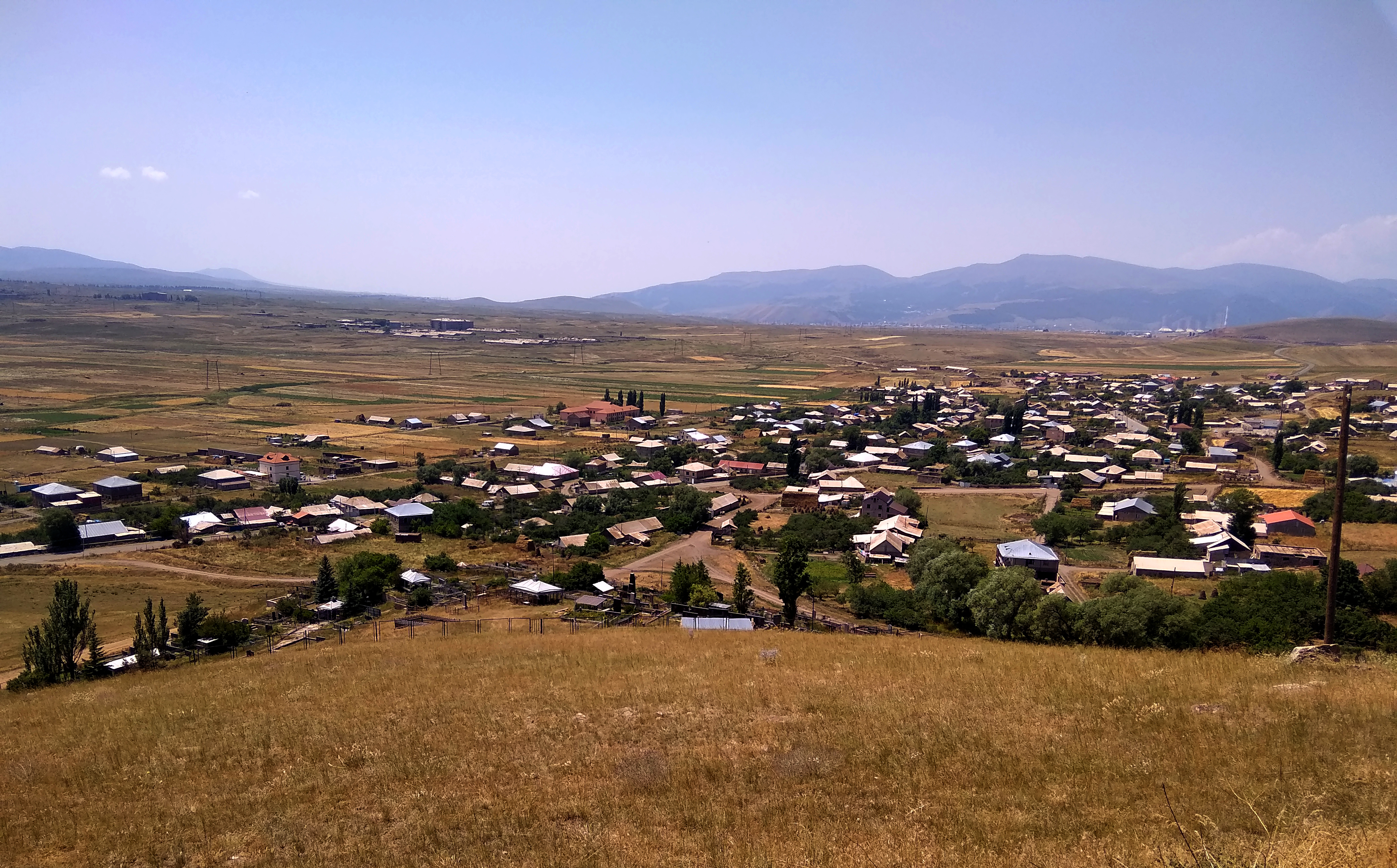
- A view of Tsaghkunk

- Location within Armenia Location within Gegharkunik
- Coordinates: 40°34′59″N 44°52′10″E
- Country: Armenia
- Province: Gegharkunik
- Municipality: Sevan
- Elevation: 1,850 m (6,070 ft)

Population (2011)
  - Total: 1,144
- Time zone: UTC+4 (AMT)

Tsaghkunk (Armenian: Ծաղկունք) is a village in the Sevan Municipality of the Gegharkunik Province of Armenia. It is situated at the right bank of the Hrazdan River, 40 km northwest from the capital city of the Kotayk Province, Hrazdan, 60 km from Yerevan and 7 km northwest of Sevan, Armenia. It is bordered by Ddmashen to the west, Geghamavan to the south, Tsovagyugh to the southeast and Dilijan National Park to the north-west. Tsaghkunk is located at the foot of the Pambak Mountain Range. St. Hovhannes, Abazants, Khachidosh Rocks and Tapidosh Hill.

== Geography and climate ==
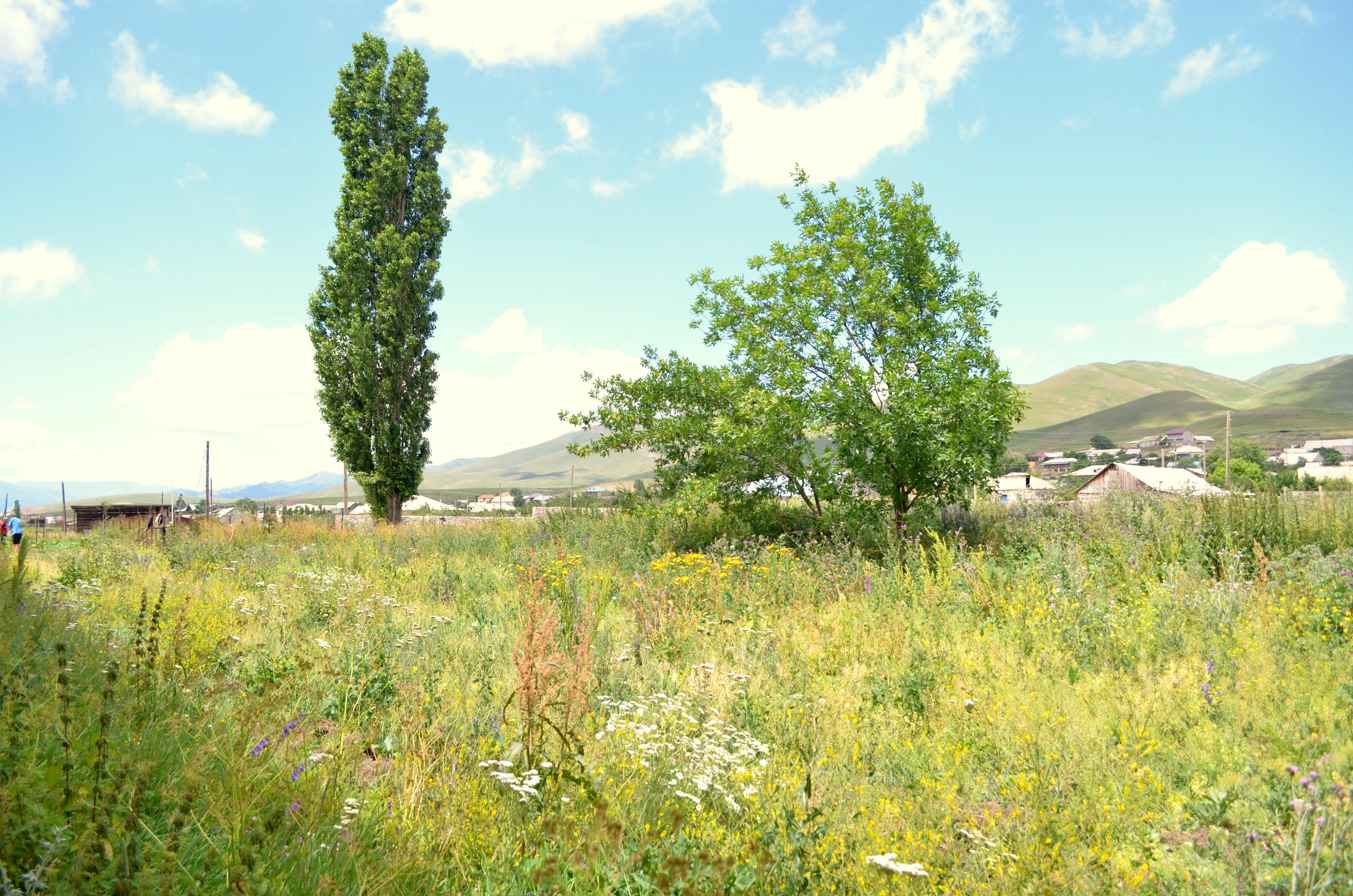
The landscape of Tsaghkunk

Tsaghkunk village, which is spread at the foot of the Pambak mountain range is rich with natural shallow water sources. The water is cold and soft and suitable for drinking. Although the eastern part of the region is dry and rocky, the rest of it is rich with dark sand. The green land is suitable for animal husbandry, such as with sheep and cattle. The highest peak of the area is Mount Ziarat (2233 m). The land in the Alapapakh and Khtorik regions is full with clay-soil. The lack of humus leads to insufficient harvest. The current watering system does not meet the needs of the society, therefore it is necessary to implement innovative methods for the watering system.

Based on the information provided by professor G. Aghajanyan, there are 1600 plant species there among which 1500 are types of flowers. There are abundant number of therapeutic plants, i.e. chamomile, perennial, thyme, dapple, Mayram flower, turtledove, cornflower, etc.

The annual average temperature ranges from 2 °C (in higher regions) to 5 °C (in lower parts). The average temperature in January is -13°-18 °C, whereas in July +15 +20 °C. General yearly precipitation is 500–600 mm. However, as records show, there were years when, because of insufficient precipitation, there was no harvest. Icy rains, which usually occur in July, August, and September have huge damaging impact on the harvest and agriculture in general. Spring and autumn frosts also have their harmful impacts. As records show, there were some years when the frost started in early September and continued till mid-October. Frosty days usually last till the end of June; however, sometimes they can extend till the first fortnight of July. Severe droughts caused damage to agriculture as well. Besides drinking water there was a shortage of irrigation water in Tsaghkunk for centuries.

The villagers are mainly involved in cattle breeding. There are also small areas for cultivating grain crops, potatoes and perennial herbs. A number of households also engage in beekeeping.

== Historical heritage ==
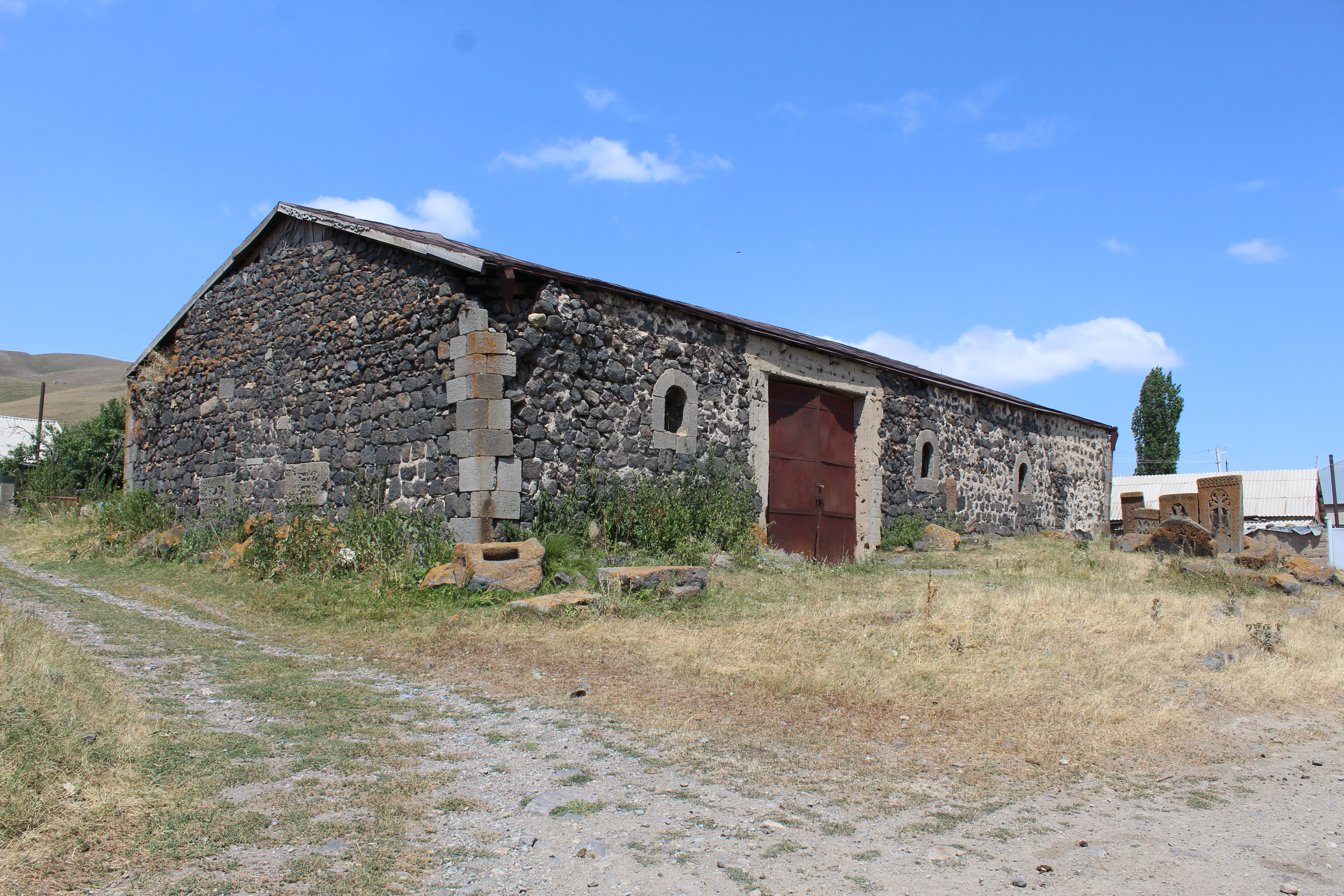
St. Harutyun Church

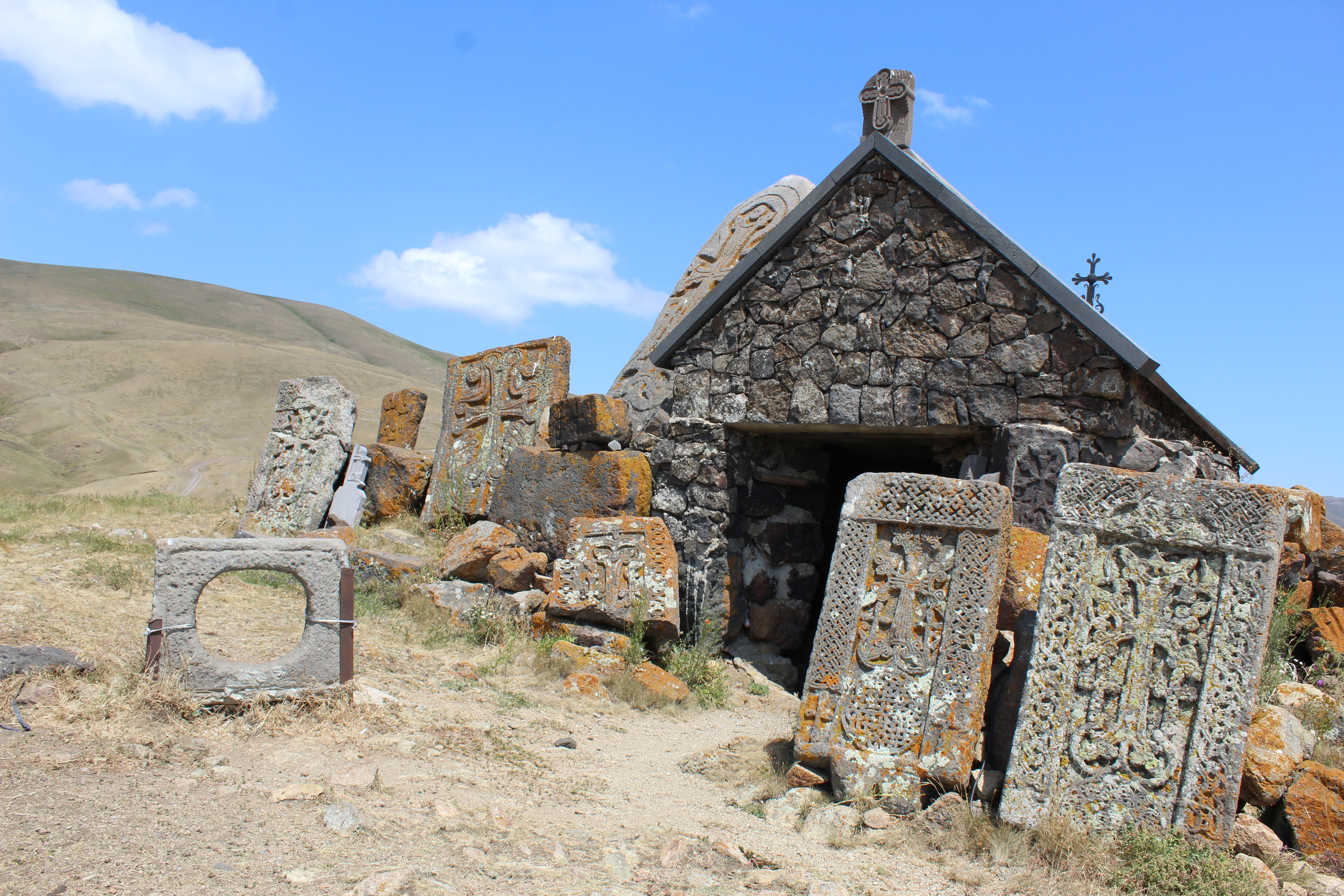
St. Sargis Chapel

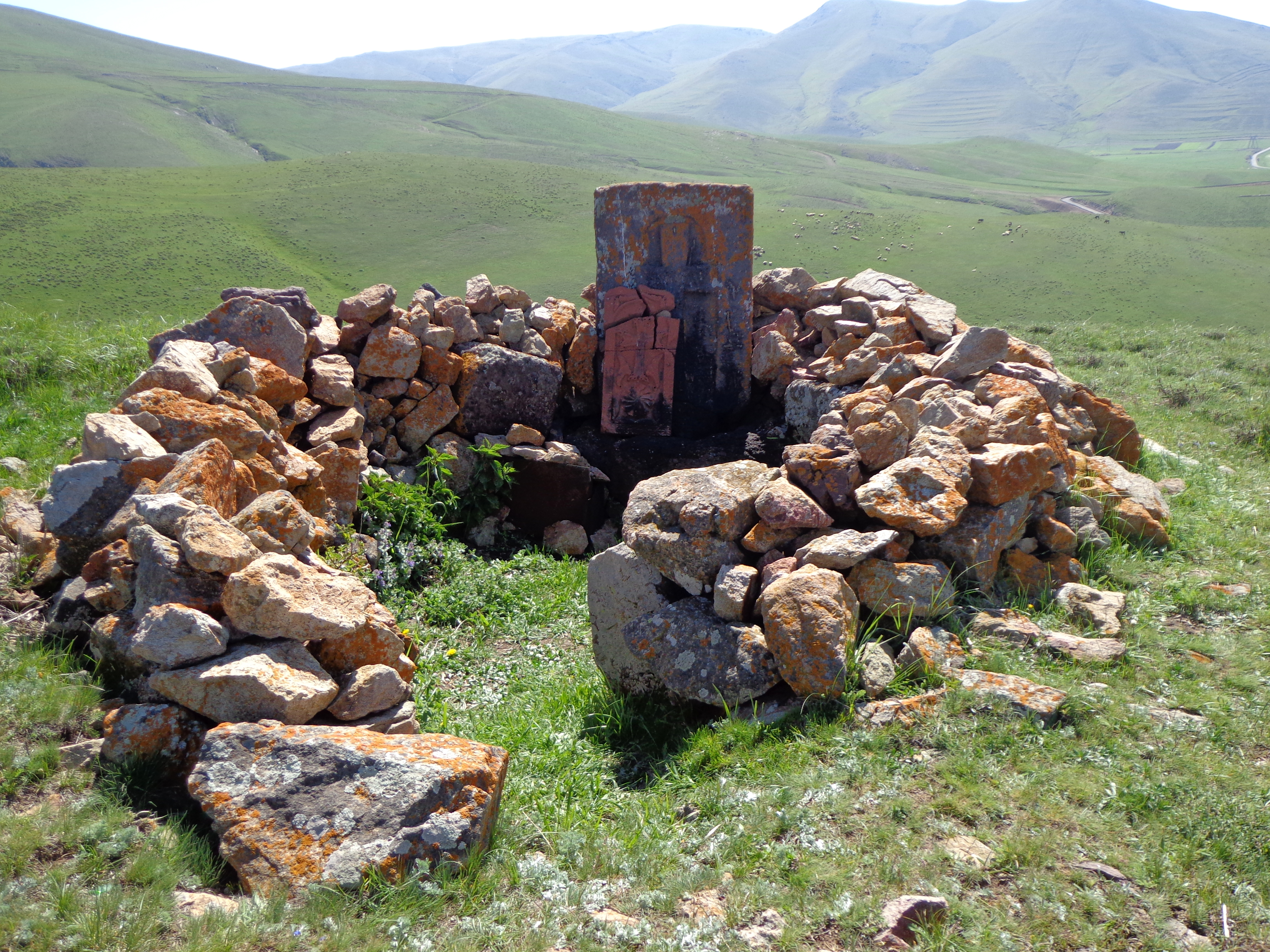
St. Hovhannes Chapel

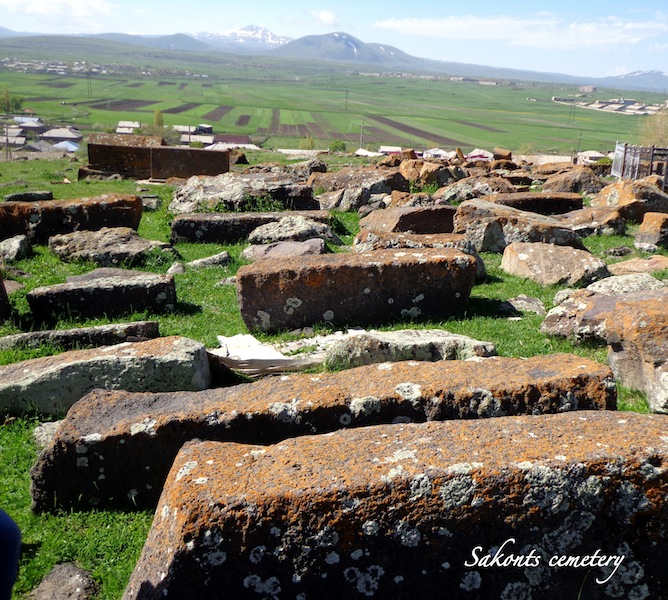
Sakonts Cemetery

Tsaghkunk is an ancient historical place; one of the 40 oldest parts of Varazhnunik - Tsaghkuneats (Tsaghkunik) - Tsakhadzor (Darachichak - Zenjerlu) region. Before 520 BC it had 45 households and was considered the administrative center of the Varazhnunik region.

In 1828, after the Treaty of Turkmenchay, Varazhnunik passed to Russia. This is the very date of official establishment of contemporary Tsaghkunk. At the same time 17 families (102 people) moved there from Maku city of Iran. The tendency of immigration to Tsaghkunk continued, i.e. in 1828-1829 many families moved from the cities of Khoy and Van. The population of Tsaghkunk was growing: in 1831 there lived 512 people in the village, and in 1939 the population peaked to 1,675. From 1849 to 1917 the village was part of Nor Bayazet marz of the Yerevan region. After the establishment of the Soviet regime it was renamed and became part of Gavar, Sevan, Dilijan, Tshambarak and Hrazdan administrative districts. Currently, Tsaghkunk is in the Sevan administrative district of the Gegarkunik Province.

In 1976 while tilling near the stables, tractor drivers found 3,500 years old women's jewellery; it is currently located in the Institute of Applied Problems of Physics in Yerevan. Even today you can see 8th-century cross-stones in Tsaghkunk. Based on 2008 data the population of Tsaghkunk was 1,186.

=== St. Harutyun Church ===
St. Harutyun Church is located in the center of the village. There is no historical information preserved. The church is a rectangular basilica building and there is a semi-circular altar in the eastern part of the church and there are two vestries on both sides. The altar is divided from main hall by a stage. The baptistery is in the eastern part of the northern wall. In 1921, after the bomb attack the church was renovated. There are two 13th-century cross-stones (khachkars) in the lying position built in the western wall (externally) and another one in the southern wall. The church used to have a domed bell tower; however, the destroyed church was reconstructed without it. According to the architectural composition and construction technique the church can be dated to the 19th century. At the front of the church there are seven cross-stones (khachkars) and more than a dozen tombstones (10th to 19th century).

=== St. Sargis Chapel and Church ===
St. Sargis chapel is situated about half a kilometre from the village on the eastern hill. According to architectural analysis and construction techniques it dates back to the 7th century. The floor plan is damaged, and it probably had a three-altar structure. The entrance is from the western side. There are cross-stones dated to the 10th to 15th centuries inside and outside the chapel. It is built of polished black basalt and the chapel size is 6.5 x 4.2 m. The chapel was restored in 2006. Next to the chapel the construction of new St. Sarkis Church was completed in 2006. It was designed by architect Vachagan Tadevosyan and was funded by philanthropist Arsen Agadjanyan. The church consecration ceremony took place on October 7, 2006. There is a stone altar placed at the entrance of the church. The nearby cemetery has graves dating to the 10th to 13th centuries.

=== St. Hovhannes Chapel ===
The chapel was built in the 10th to 13th centuries. It is located in the northern part of the village, on the top of a hill. Currently it is destroyed. The cross-stones date back to the 12th or 13th century and are located on a pedestal. It is said that the chapel was the place for making vows. Those who could not return to the village because of inappropriate deeds used to go the St. Hovhannes Church and promised not to return. However, in case of return they crawled to the cross-stones and vowed not to repeat their mistakes and only after that were allowed to return to the village.

=== Tsiranavor Chapel ===
The chapel dates to the 12th to 13th centuries and currently is destroyed. According to village elders, the mediator Simon placed the basalt stone over the cross-stones to make access to cross-stones only on all fours.

=== Tsaghkvanq Chapel ===
The ruins of the chapel are located in the southern part of the village. According to stories told by elders there was a dome church instead of the chapel, however, it was destroyed by Shah Abbas during the deportation of local population in 1604. Later, the chapel was built there. In 1940 the chapel was destroyed and the rocks and cross-stones were used in the construction of the school basis. Currently, the roof is covered by asbestos-cement sheet.

=== Sakonts Cemetery ===
The cemetery is located in the northwestern part of the village, and dates back to between the 10th and the 20th centuries. There are some anonymous cross-stones and a base of either a church or a chapel full of stones. This needs excavation.

=== The memorial of Tsaghkunk villagers fallen in the Great Patriotic War ===
The memorial complex was initiated and designed by Gagik Avagyan. It is dedicated to the memory of Tsaghkunk villagers which fell during World War II (the Great Patriotic war). By the advice of Rafil Mkrtchyan the contract was signed with the sculptor Samvel Manasyan, who had the eagle model of the memorial. Under the auspices of eagle wings the victorious soldier thrust a sword in his left hand into the ground: saying "no" to war and looked at the torch in his right hand. Eagle eyes are directed to the east, waiting for the sun and at the same time protecting the victorious soldier's back - native land. Below the memorial the "Wheel of History" wall is built, which presents the aggressive invasion of fascist Germany that turned and shaped the trajectory of human history. There are two water springs next to the soldier, symbolizing pureness of their souls. Before climbing the stairs leading to memorial stop for a moment and look at the head of the eagle – the outlines of "Khachi dosh" and "Sev Arot" hills shape wings of the flying eagle. At the front of the memorial, on the basalt stone, the following is engraved, "No one is forgotten, nothing is forgotten".

== Education ==
At the end of 19th century one-grade or two-grade schools were opened in Tsaghkunk and in 1907 the Tsar ordered to open a class with 44 students. In 1919, the school was separate from the church. In 1920 houses of many villagers were used as classrooms. Their names are Gevorgyan Aram, Elizbarents, Gevorgyan Gevorg, Sarants Grigor, Mnatsakanants Hovhannes, Poujourants Grish, Agho's Goqor and others. During those times, the village youth continued to pursue education in Dilijan, Kanaker and Yerevan. In 1939–1940 at the initiative of the head of the village councilor, Garegin Avagyan, and the collective farm director Moushegh Hovsepyan, a school building for 320 students was designed in Yerevan. The construction was implemented by the Sevan utility division office. The construction was over in 1942.

On 7 October 2007, the school building was renovated and named in honor of Hovhannes Tumanyan, an Armenian poet. The renovation was funded by "Dar" foundation.

== Gallery ==
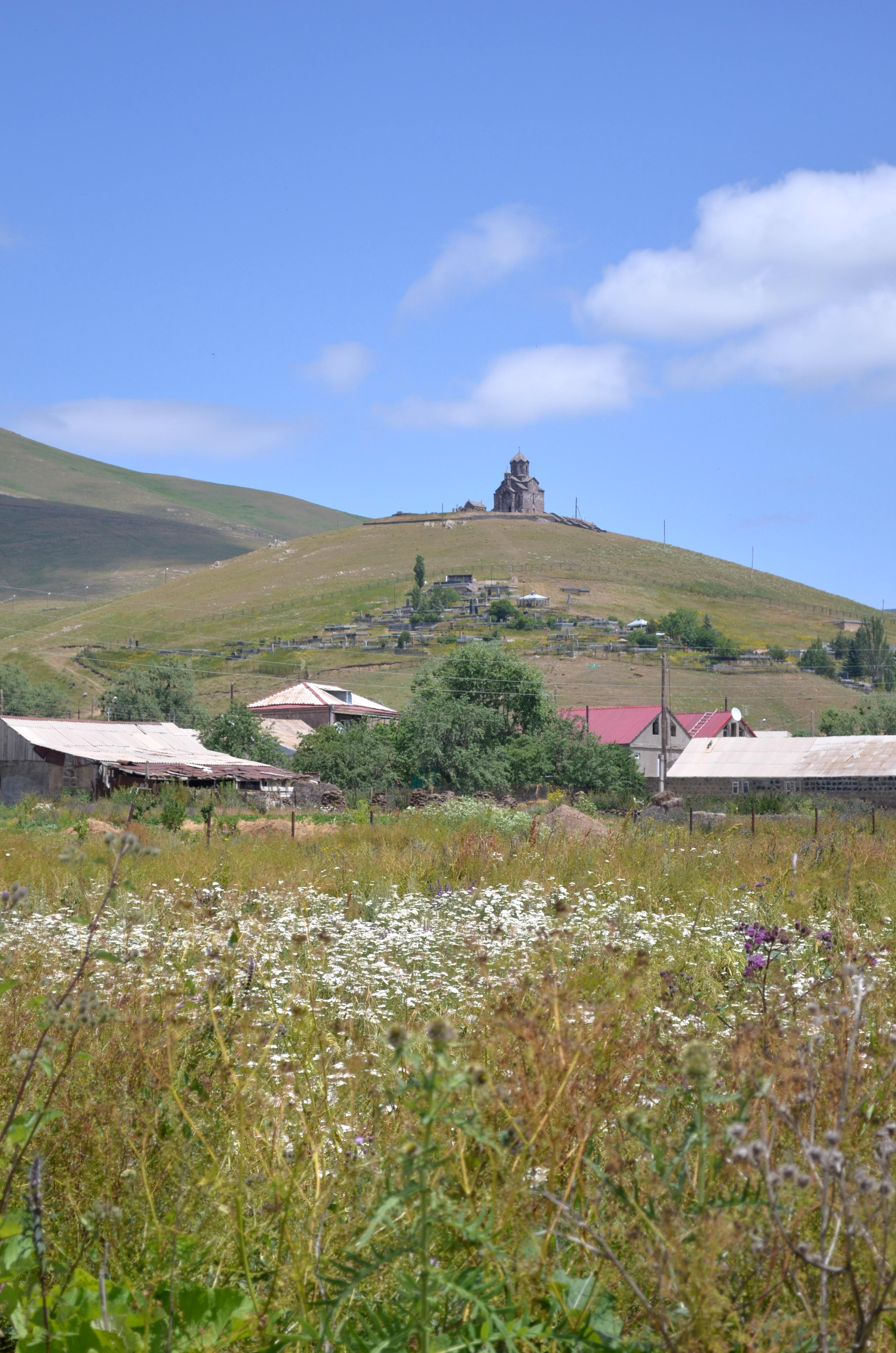
St. Sargis Church from the village

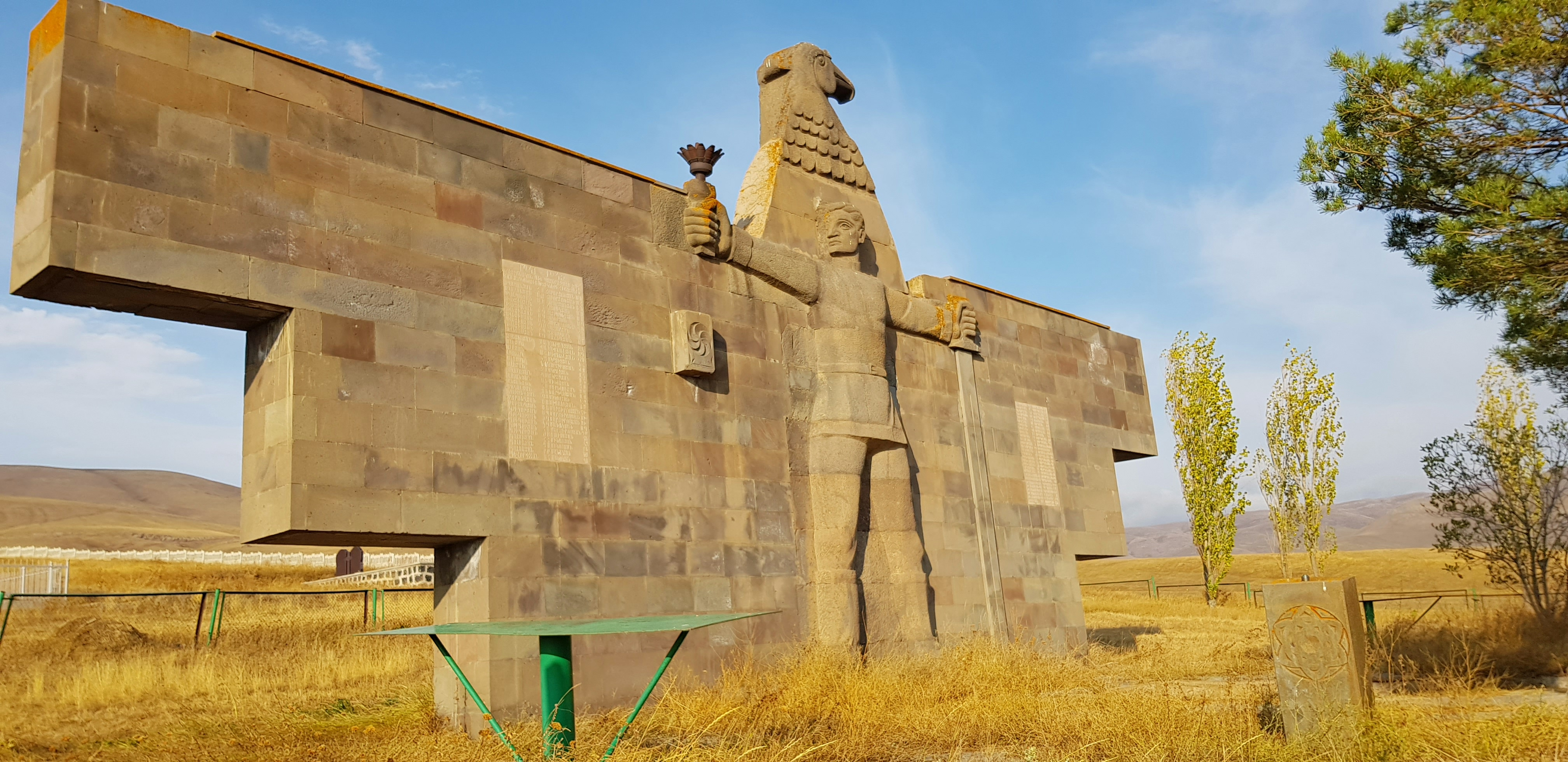
WWII monument

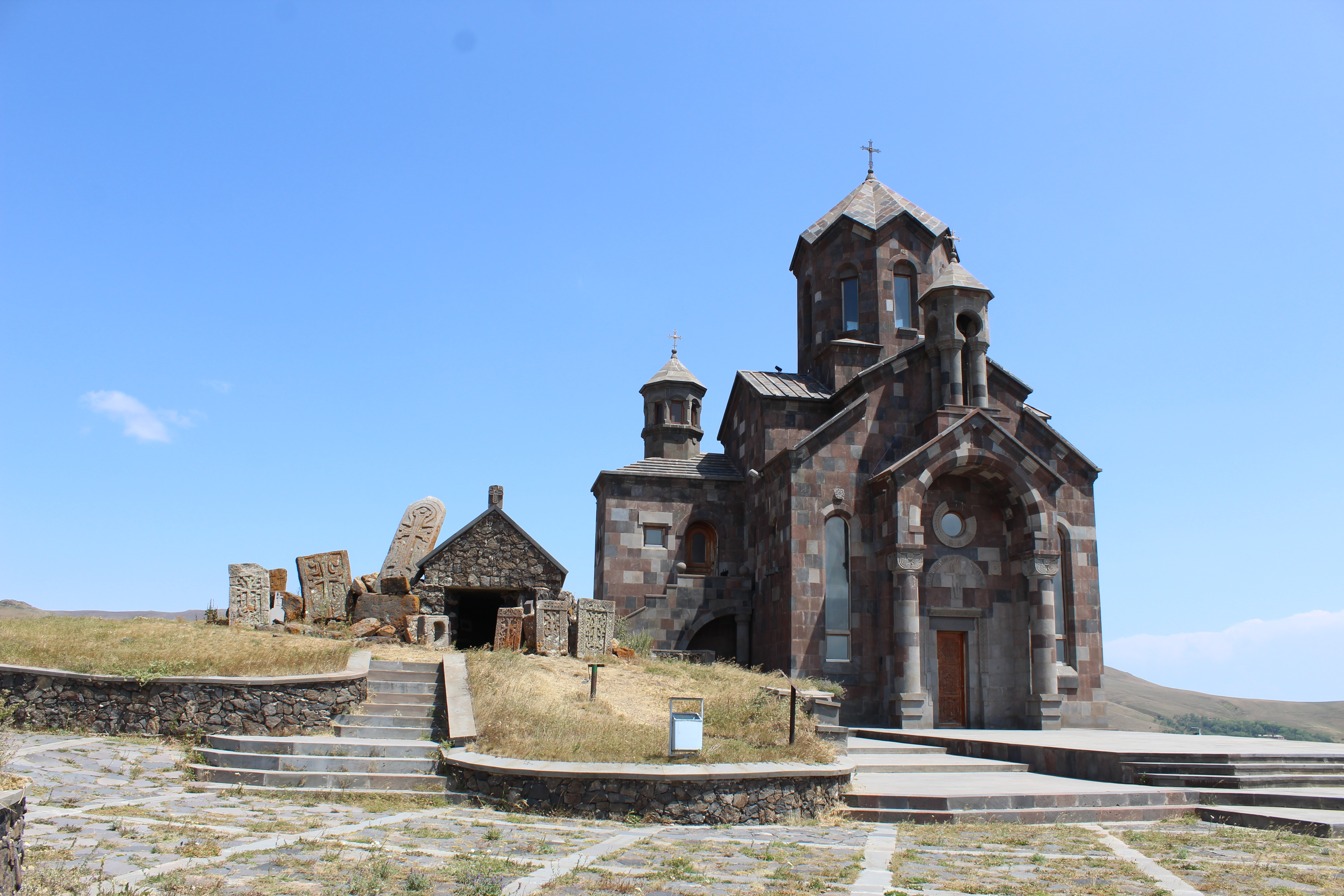
St. Sargis Church

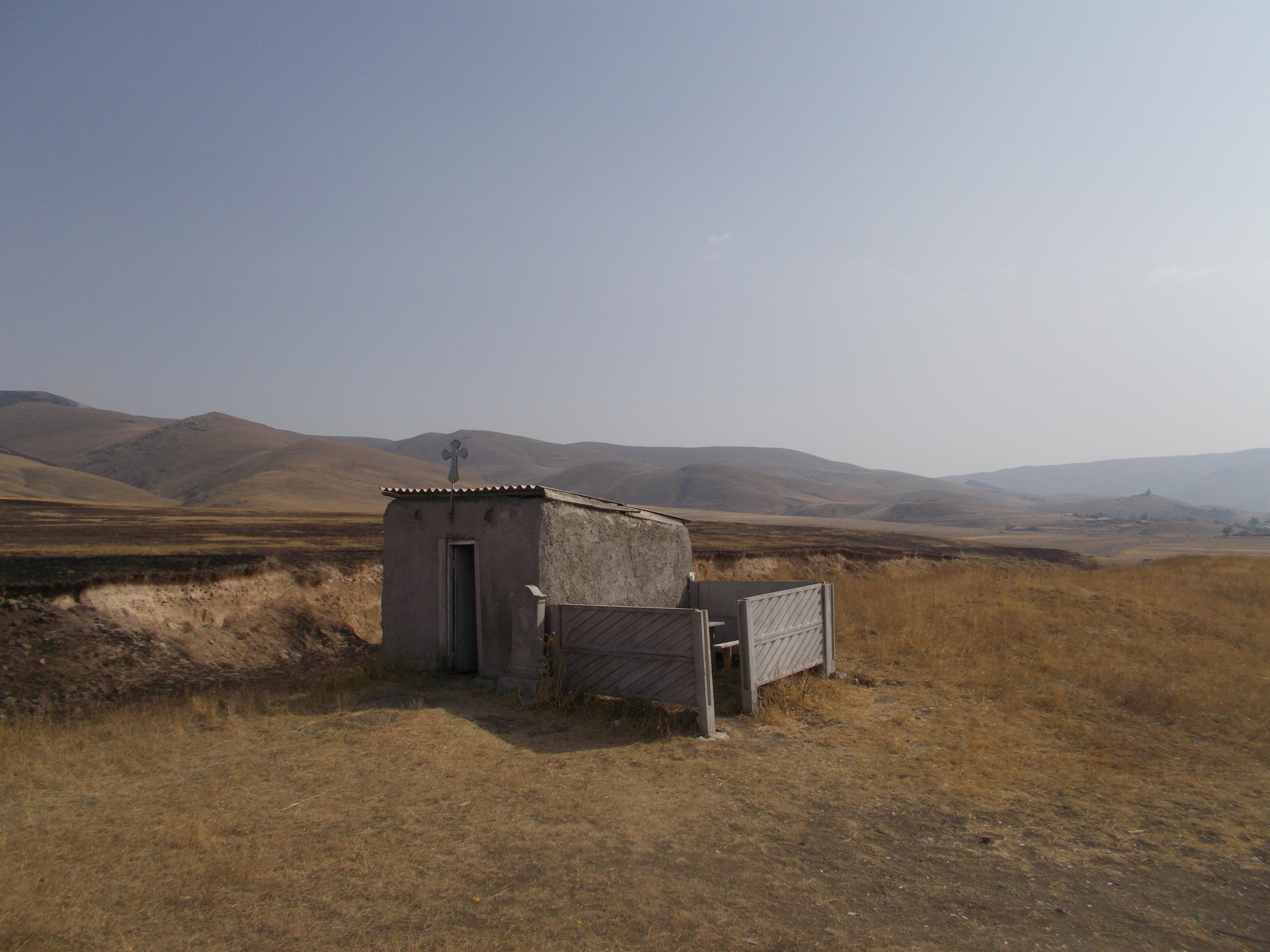
Chapel near Tsaghkunk

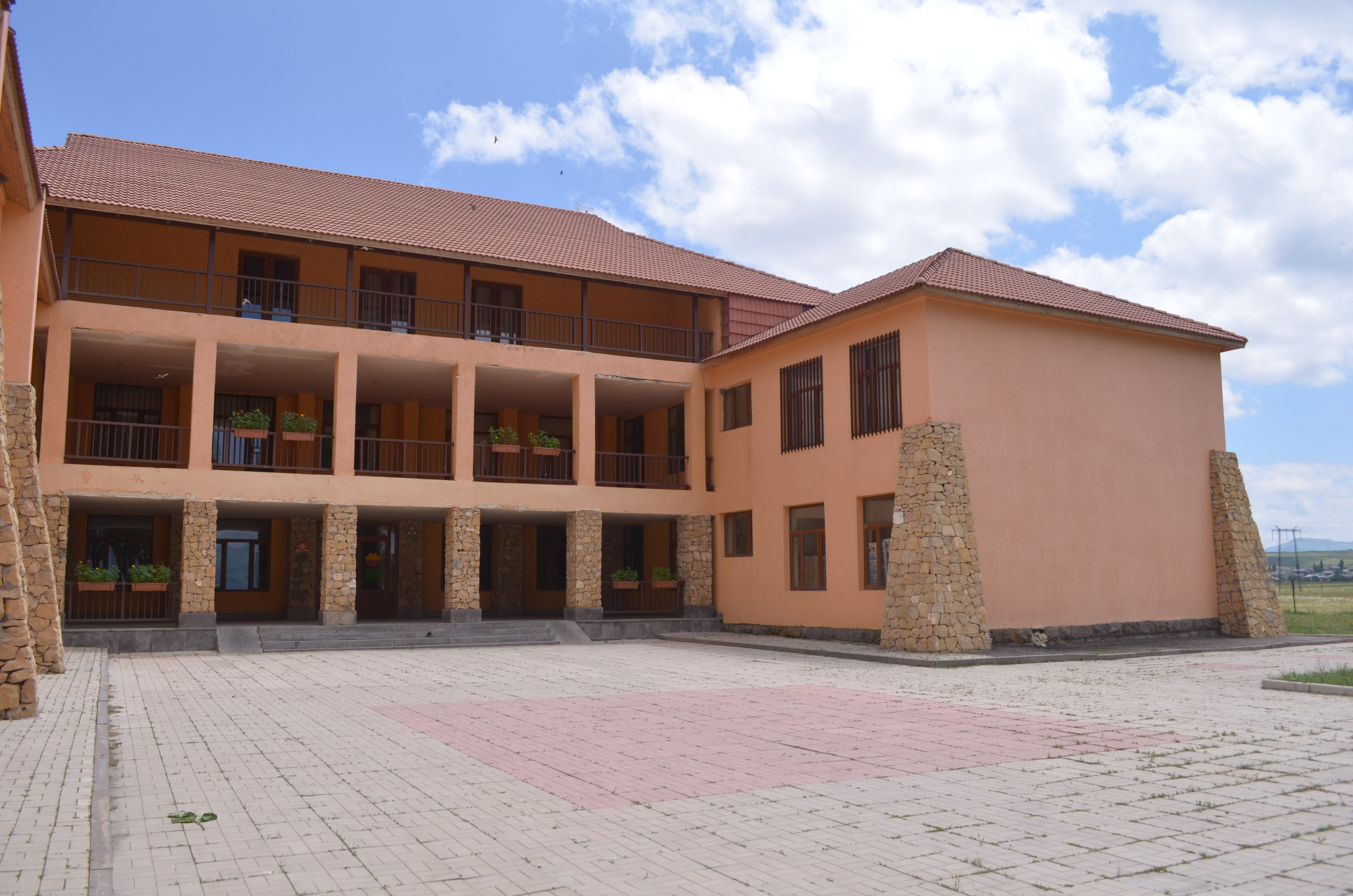
Tsaghkunk school after renovation in 2007
