= Berkanush =

Berkanush Բերքանուշ
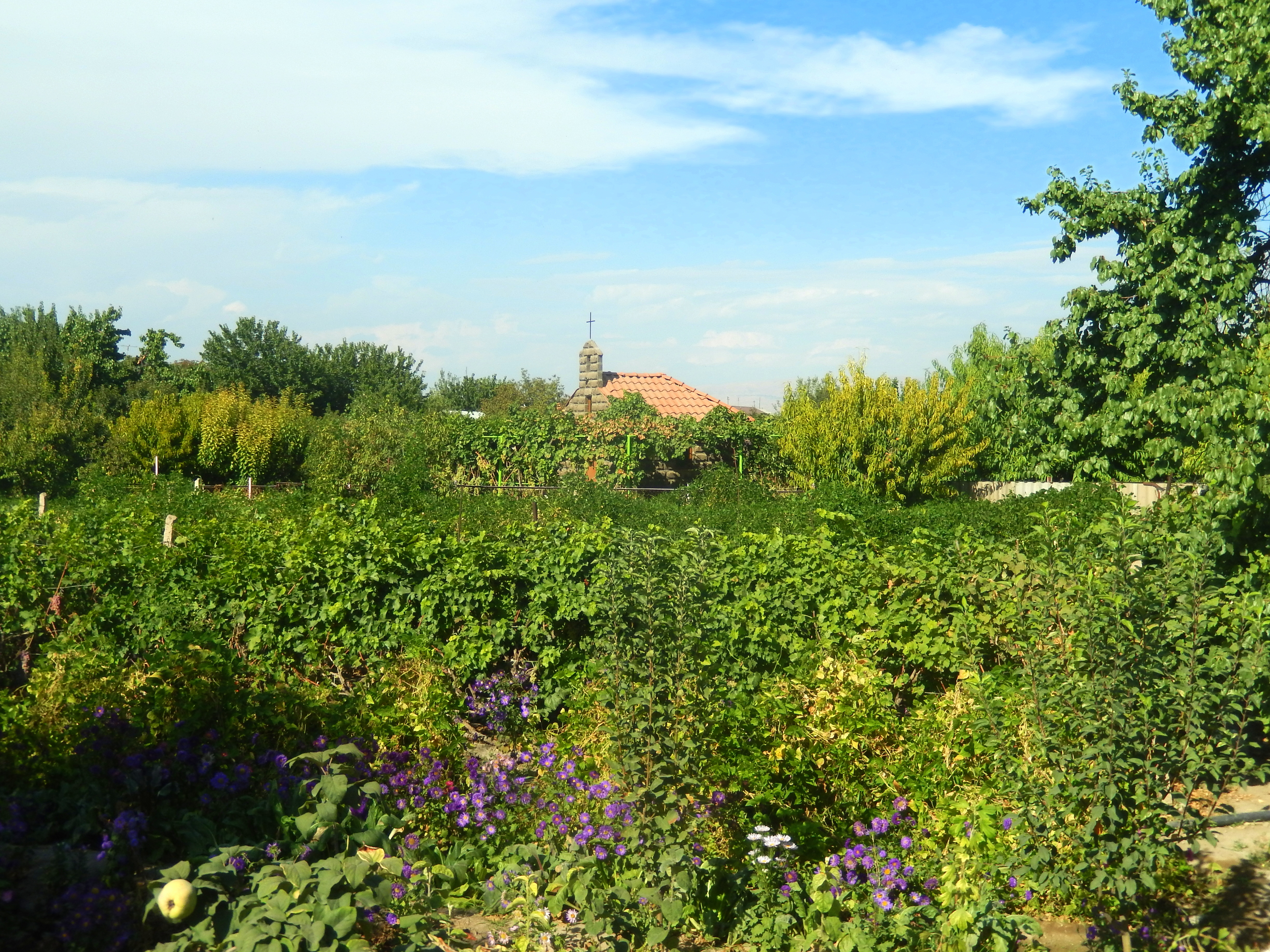

- Location within Armenia Location within Ararat
- Coordinates: 39°59′N 44°31′E
- Country: Armenia
- Province: Ararat
- Municipality: Artashat

Population (2011)
  - Total: 1,568
- Time zone: UTC+4 (AMT)

Berkanush (Armenian: Բերքանուշ) is a village in the Artashat Municipality of the Ararat Province of Armenia.

== Gallery ==
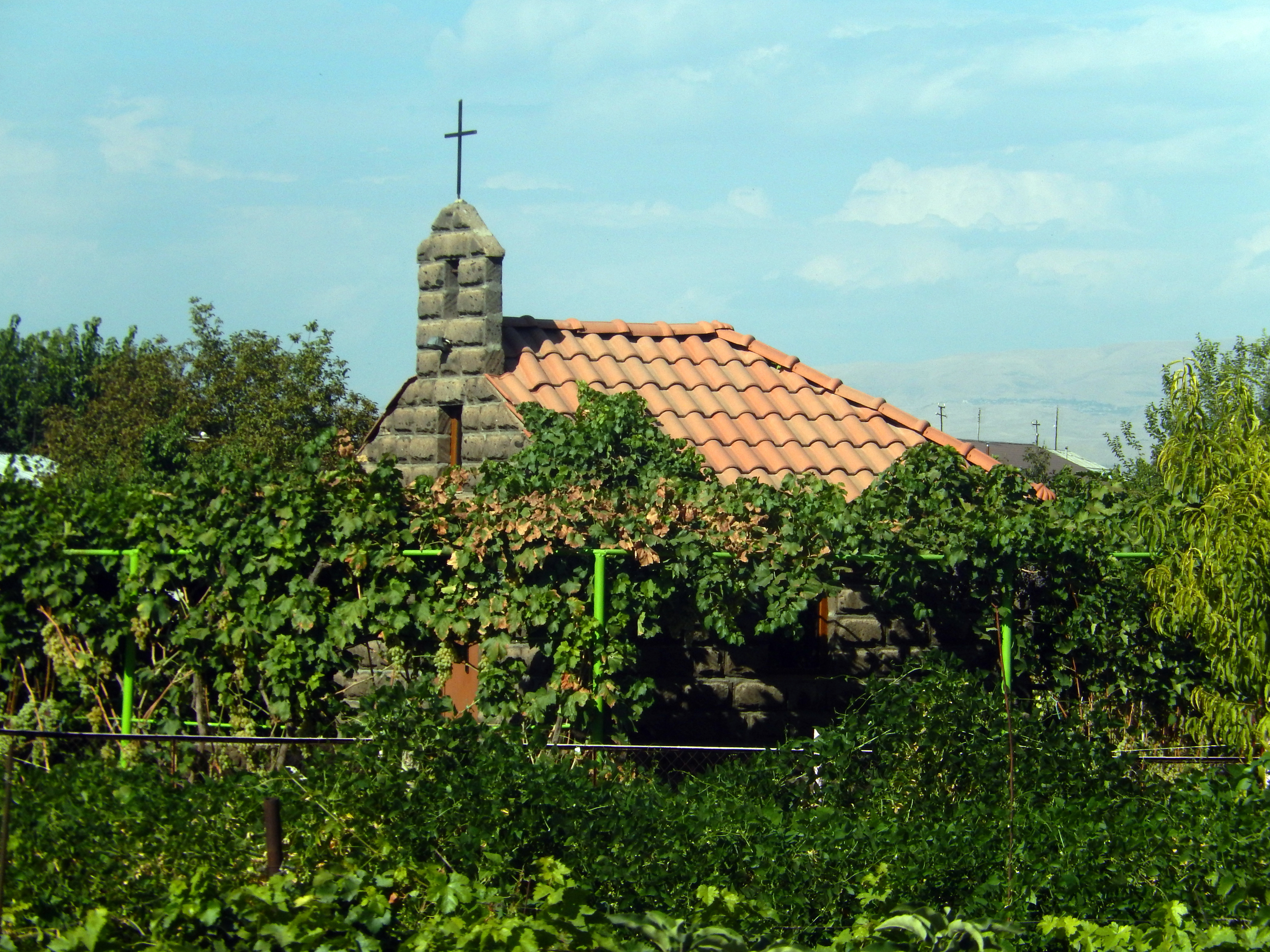
Chapel of Surb Karapet (Armenian: Սուրբ Կարապետ մատուռ, romanized: Surb Karapet Matur)

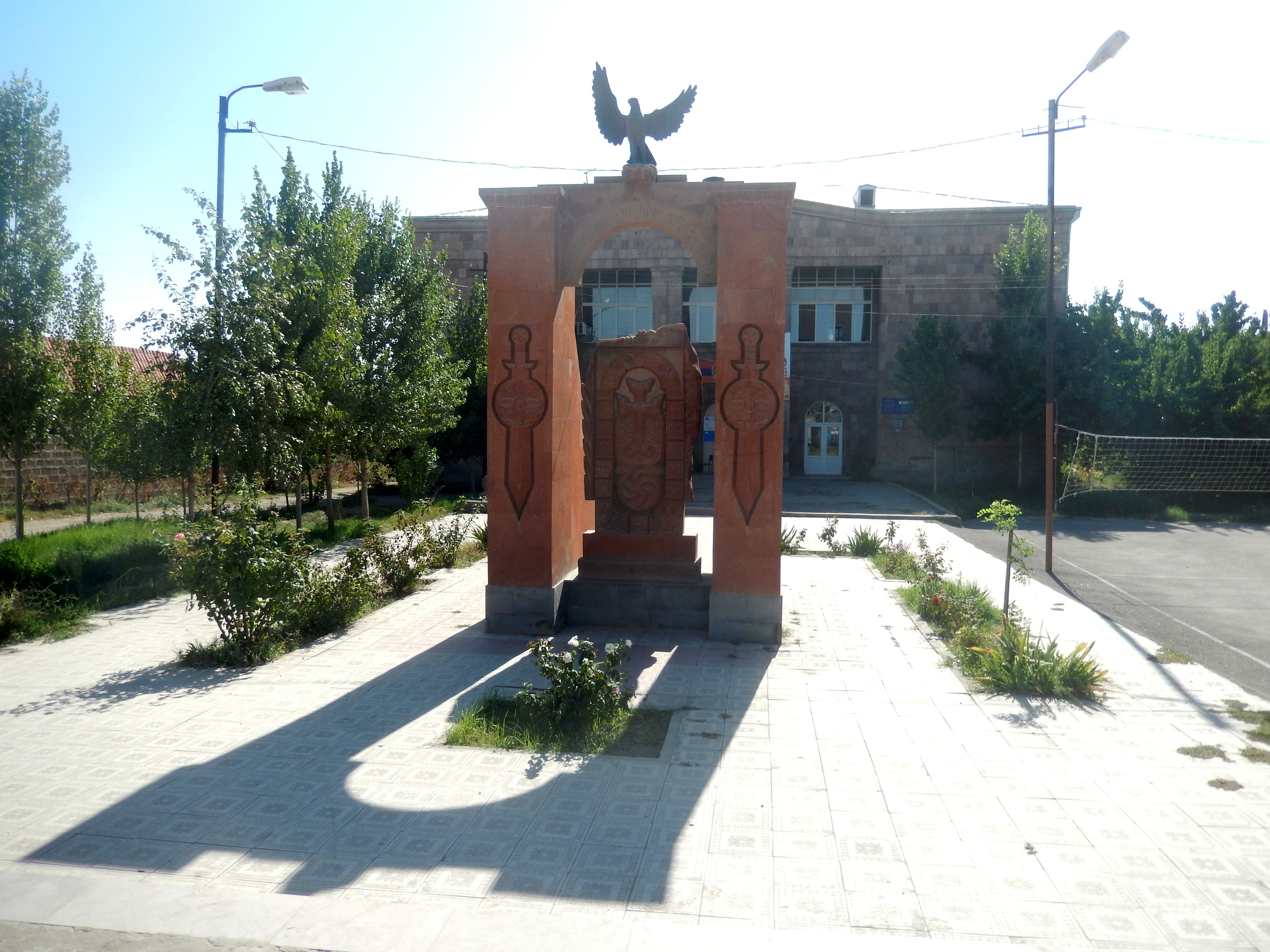
Monument and House of Culture

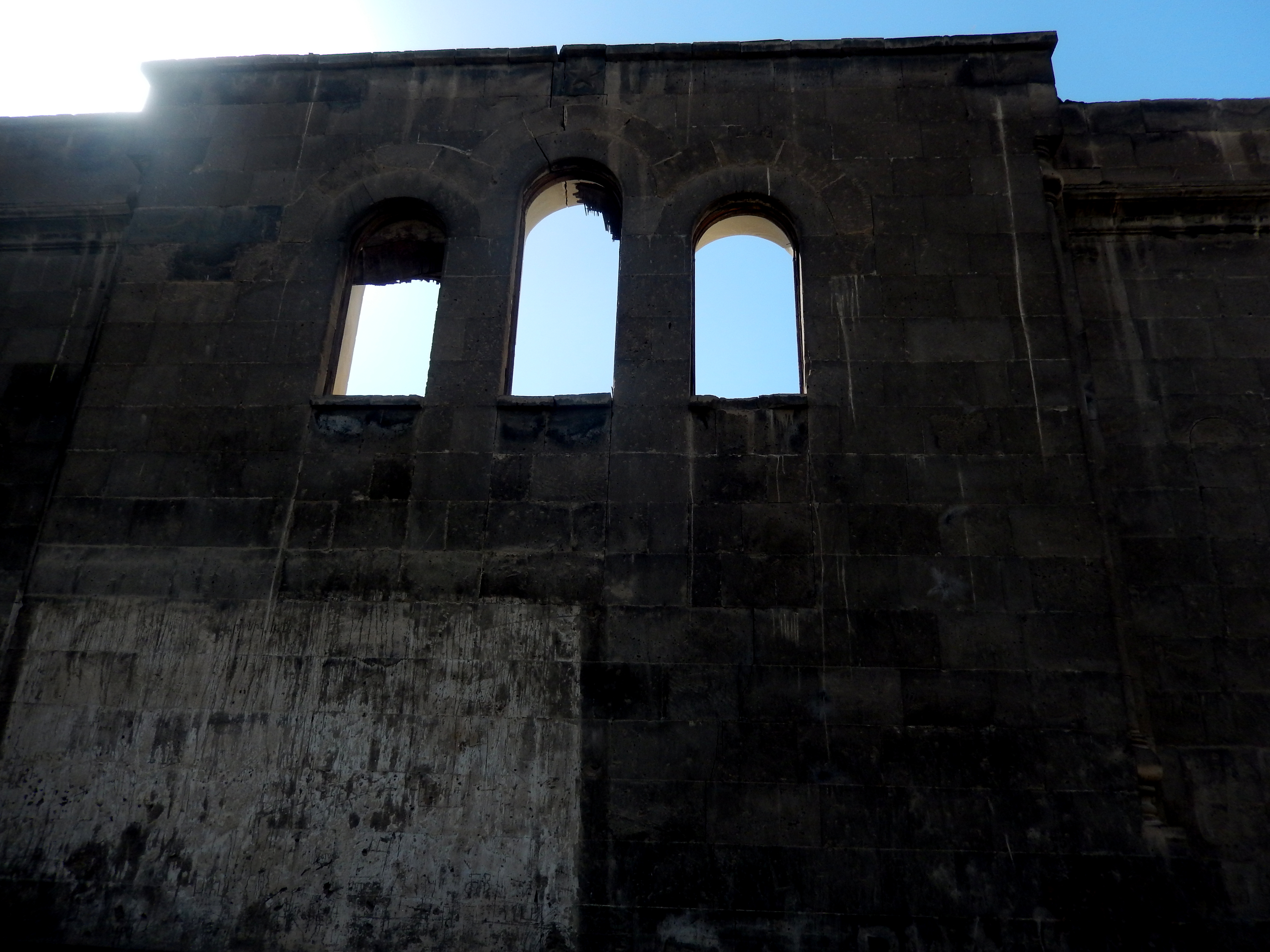
Ruined church
