= Khoronk =

Village in Armavir, Armenia

Khoronk Խորոնք
- Location within Armenia
- Coordinates: 40°08′09″N 44°14′40″E
- Country: Armenia
- Province: Armavir

Population (2011)
  - Total: 2,507

Khoronk (Armenian: Խորոնք, also Romanized as Khoronq; formerly, Lenugi, Nizhniy Aylanlu, Nerkin Aylanlu, and Lenughi) is a town in the Armavir Province of Armenia. The town's church dates to 1880.
