= Ayntap, Armenia =

Ayntap Այնթապ
- Location within Armenia Location within Ararat
- Coordinates: 40°05′55″N 44°28′05″E
- Country: Armenia
- Province: Ararat
- Municipality: Masis

Population (2011)
  - Total: 8,376
- Time zone: UTC+4
  - Summer (DST): UTC+5

Ayntap (Armenian: Այնթապ) is a village in the Masis Municipality of Ararat Province, Armenia.
