= Jrarat, Kotayk =

Jrarat Ջրառատ
- Skyline of Jrarat

- Location within Armenia
- Coordinates: 40°33′12″N 44°45′27″E
- Country: Armenia
- Province: Kotayk
- Founded: 1982

Population (2011)
  - Total: 521
- Time zone: UTC+4 (AMT)

Jrarat (Armenian: Ջրառատ) is a village in the Kotayk Province of Armenia. It was incorporated in 1982 and is the center of the dairy industry.

== Toponymy ==
The village was previously known as Randamal.
