= Norashen, Tavush =

Norashen Նորաշեն
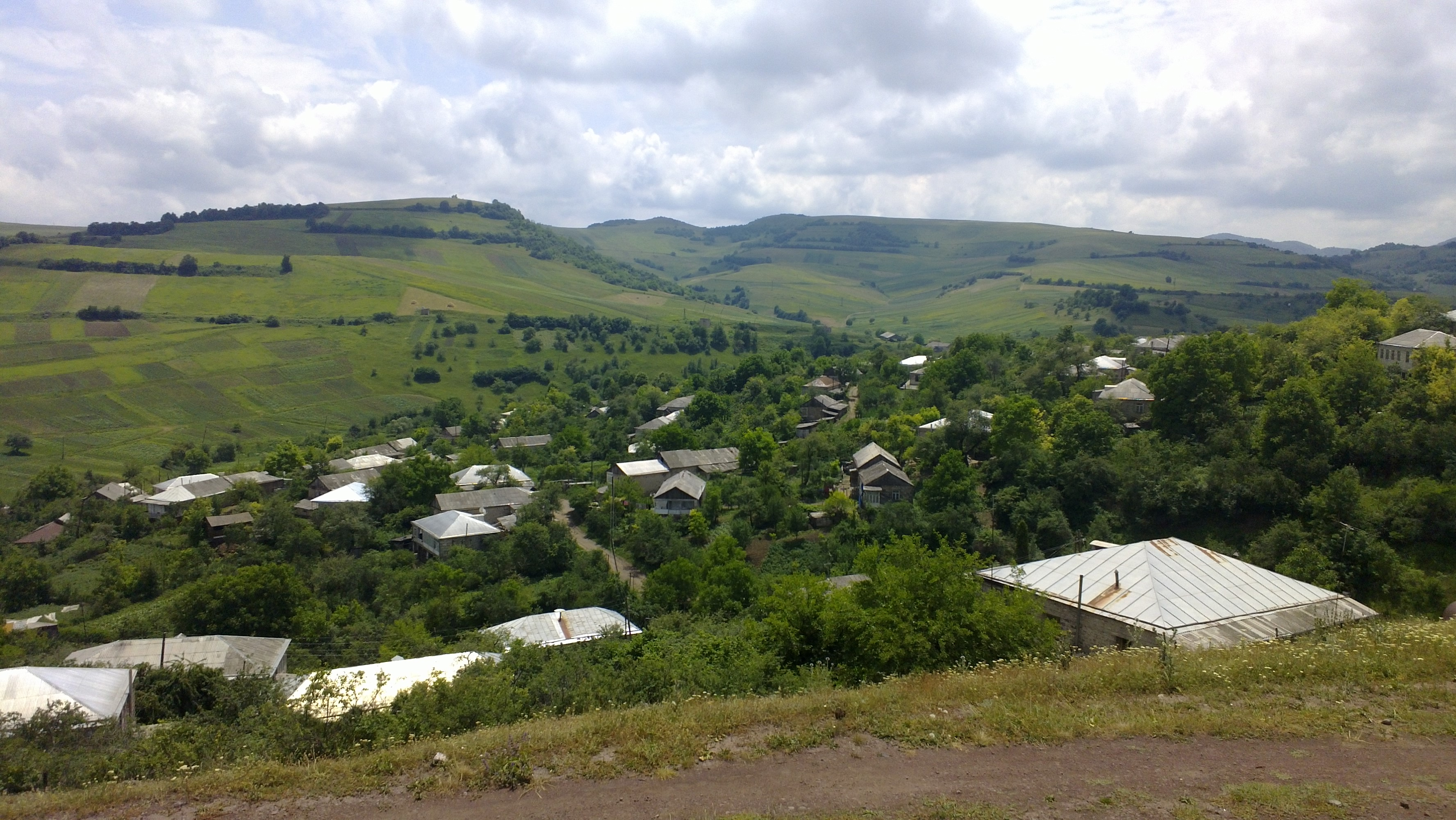
- A view of Norashen

- Location within Armenia Location within Tavush
- Coordinates: 40°52′37″N 45°27′34″E
- Country: Armenia
- Province: Tavush
- Municipality: Berd

Population (2011)
  - Total: 1,677
- Time zone: UTC+4 (AMT)

Norashen (Armenian: Նորաշեն) is a village in the Berd Municipality of the Tavush Province of Armenia. There is a museum in the village, as well as a cyclopean fort close by.

== Gallery ==
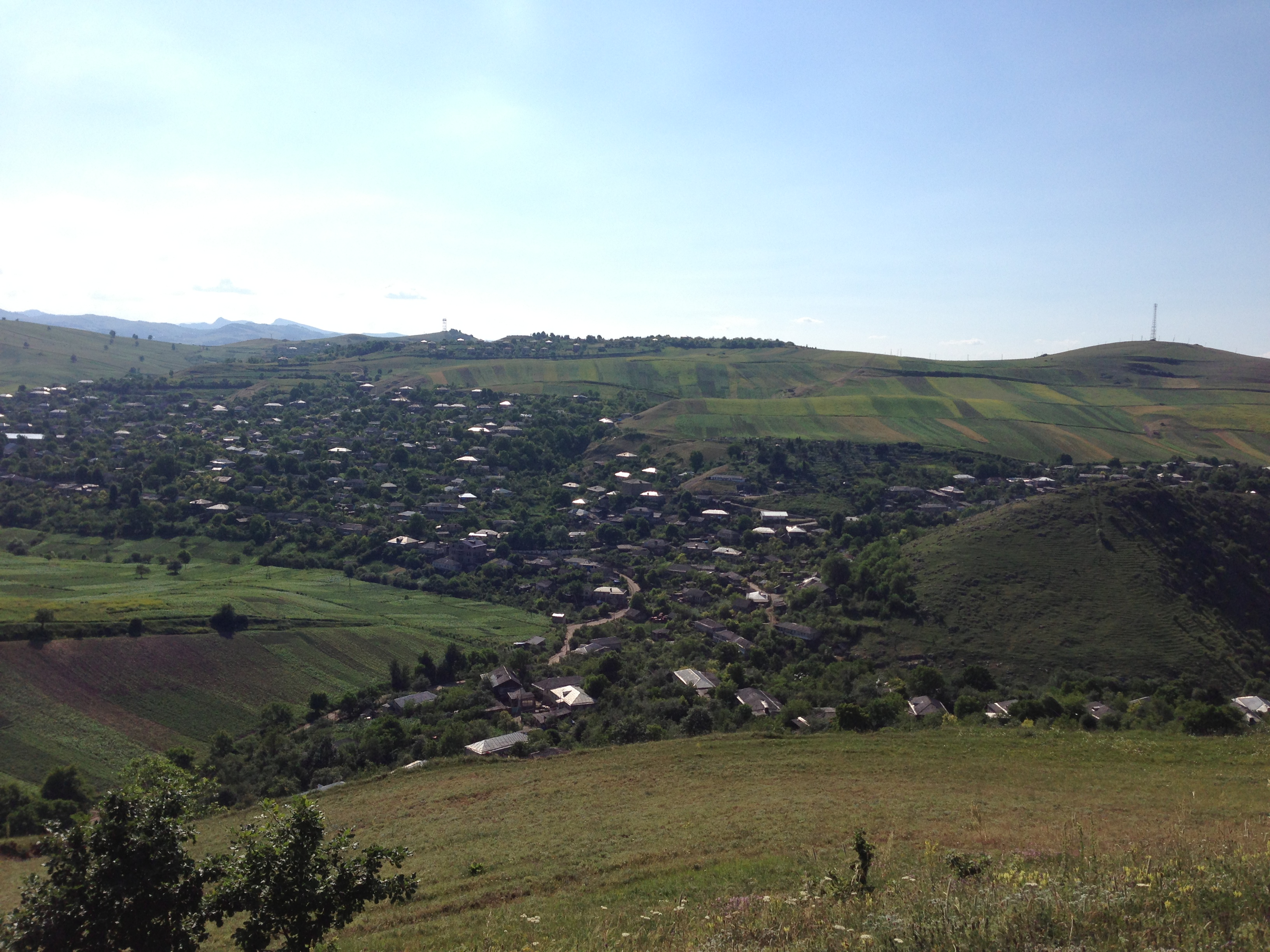
A view of Norashen

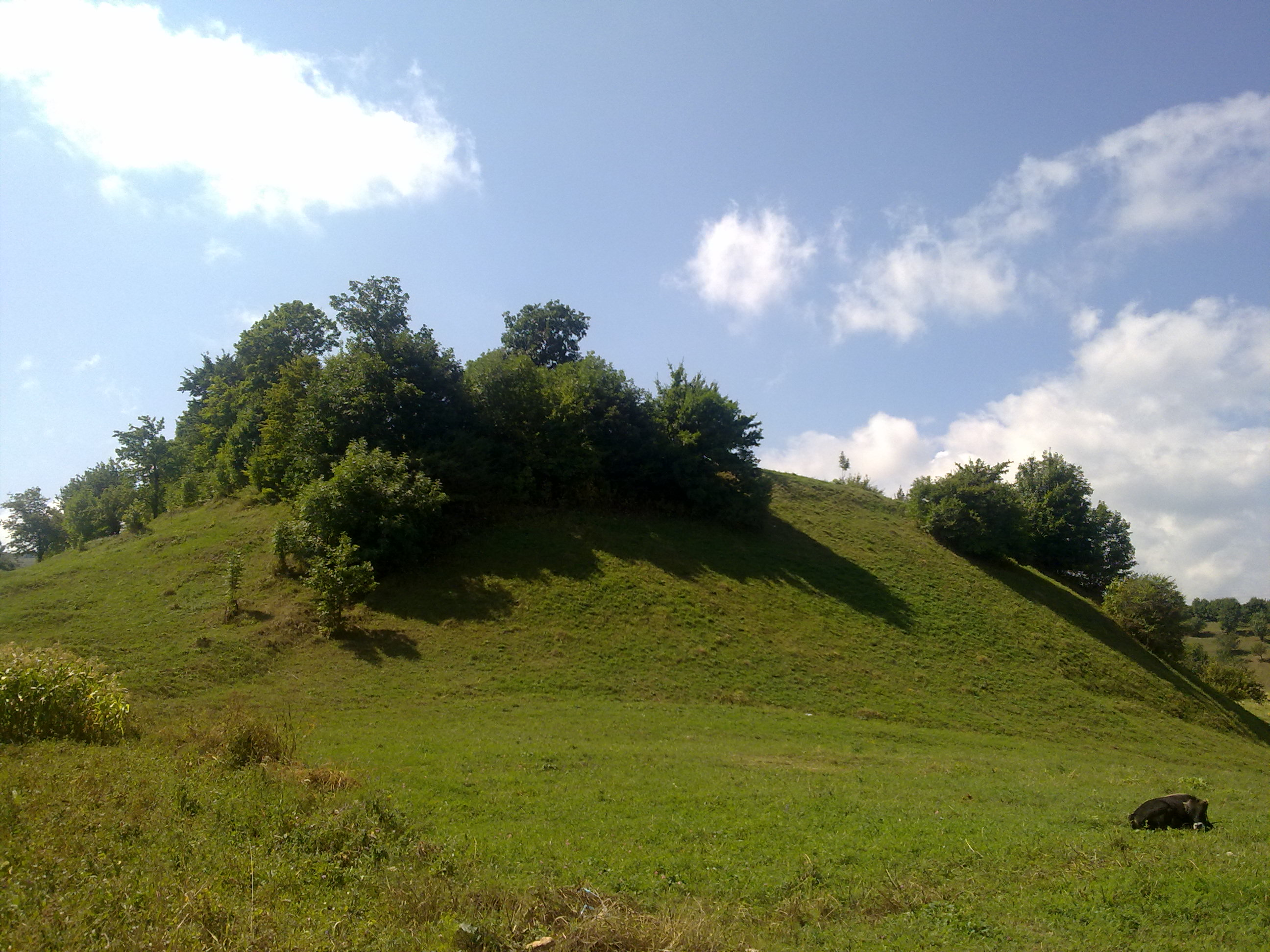
The cyclopean fort

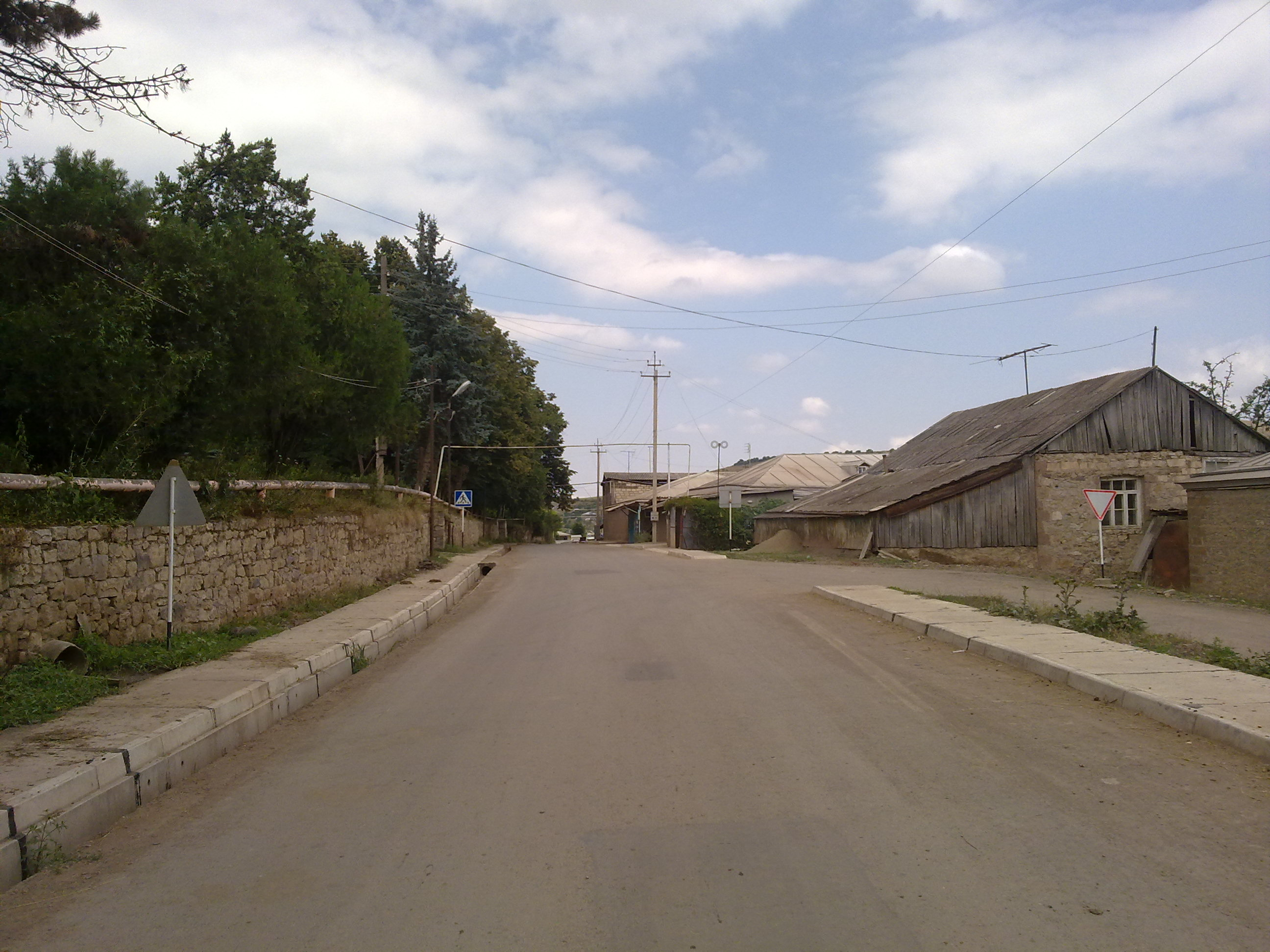
Street in Norashen

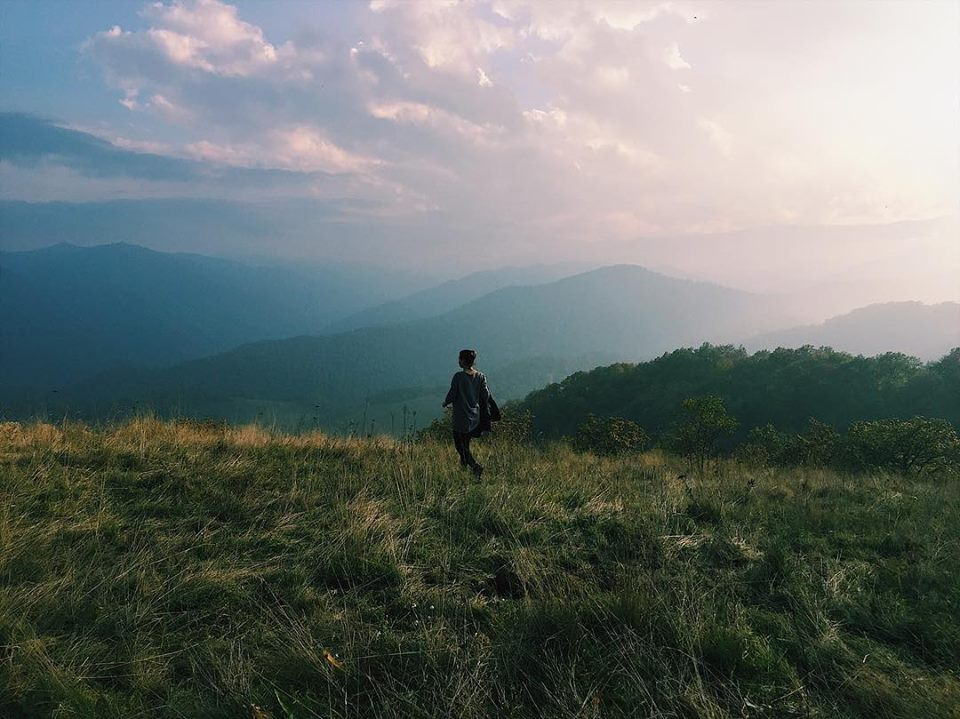
Scenery around Norashen

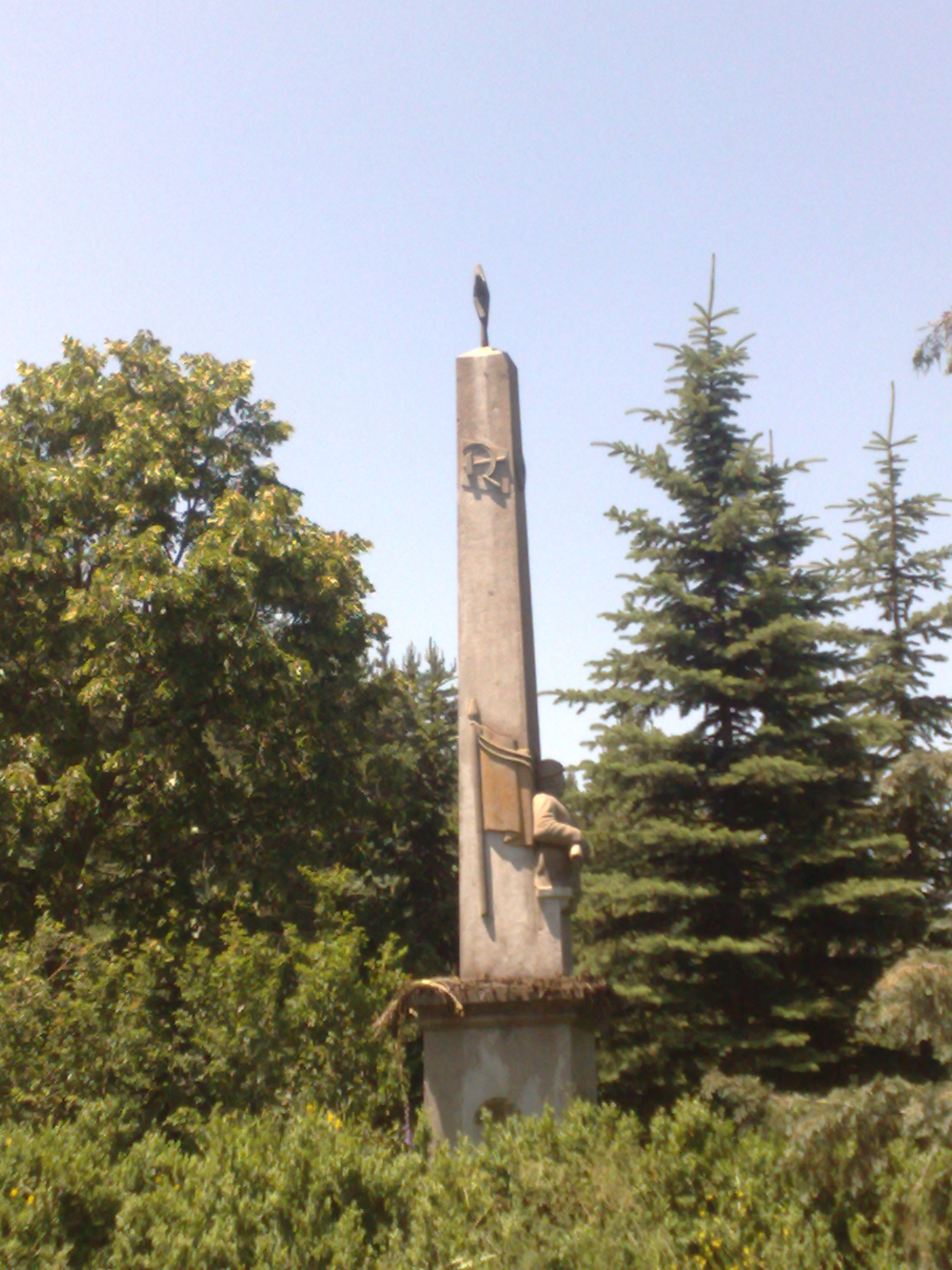
WWII monument in Norashen

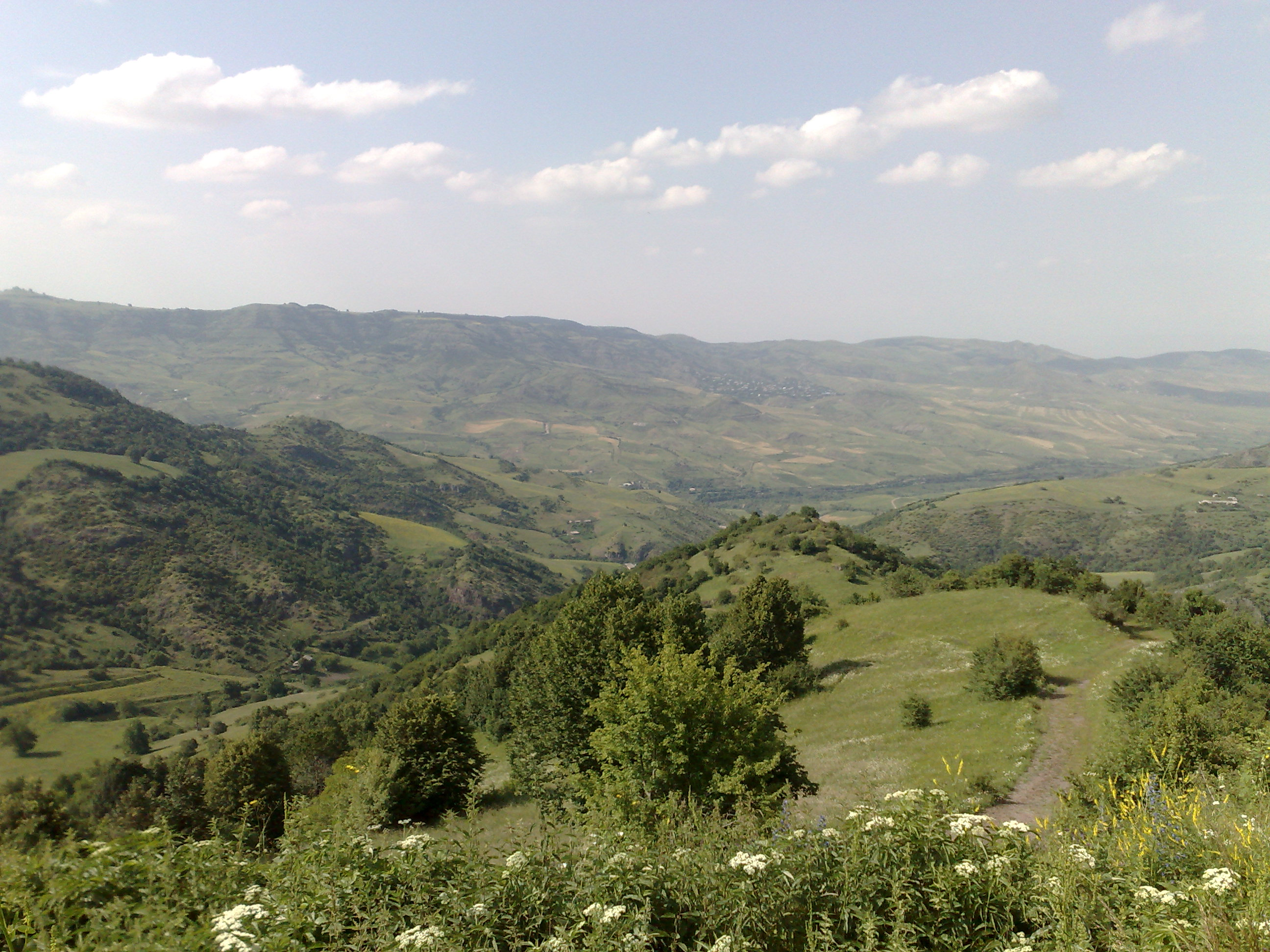
Scenery around Norashen

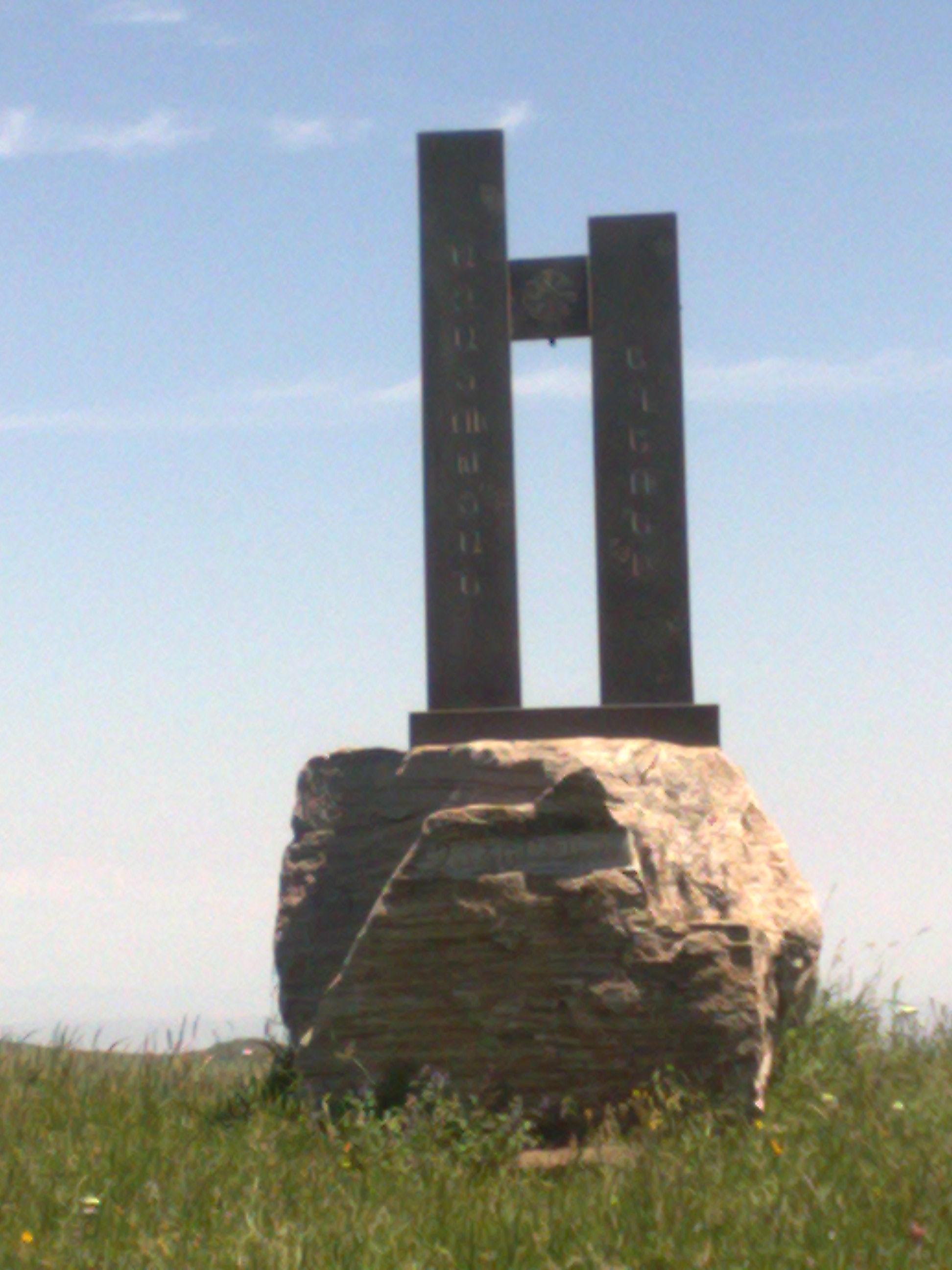
Armenian genocide memorial in Norashen
