= Tsovagyugh =

Village in Gegharkunik, Armenia

Tsovagyugh Ծովագյուղ
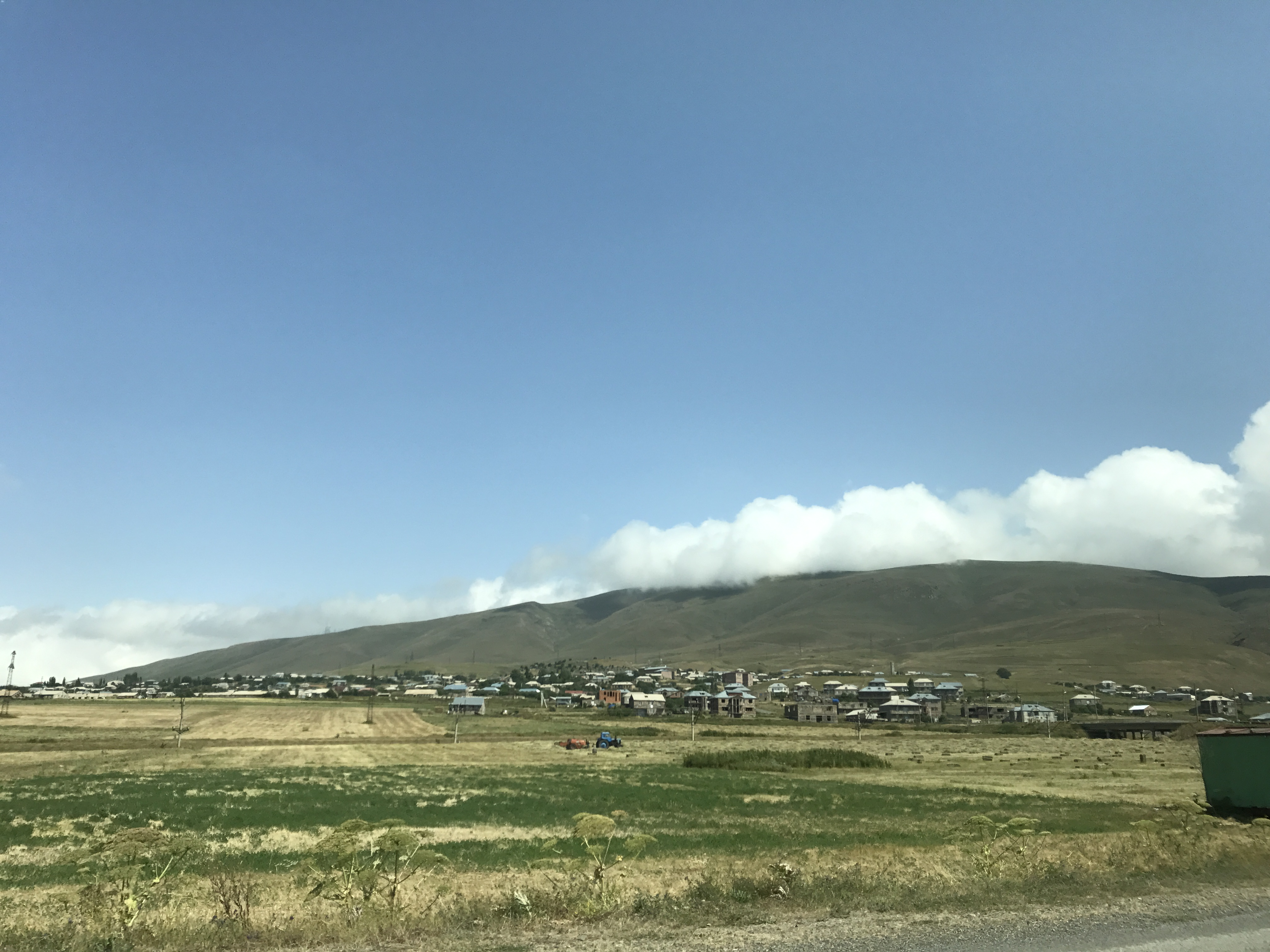
- A view of Tsovagyugh

- Location within Armenia Location within Gegharkunik
- Coordinates: 40°37′59″N 44°57′08″E
- Country: Armenia
- Province: Gegharkunik
- Municipality: Sevan

Population (2011)
  - Total: 4,189
- Time zone: UTC+4 (AMT)

Tsovagyugh (Armenian: Ծովագյուղ [tsɔvɑˈgjuʁ]) is a village in the Sevan Municipality of the Gegharkunik Province of Armenia.

== Name ==
The village was mentioned by the 13th-century historian Kirakos Gandzaketsi as Chapotik, which later became Chibukhlu. It was renamed Tsovagyugh ('lake village') on 3 January 1935.

== History ==
The village contains church ruins, and upon an egg-shaped hill to the northeast are the remains of an Iron Age fort.

== Gallery ==
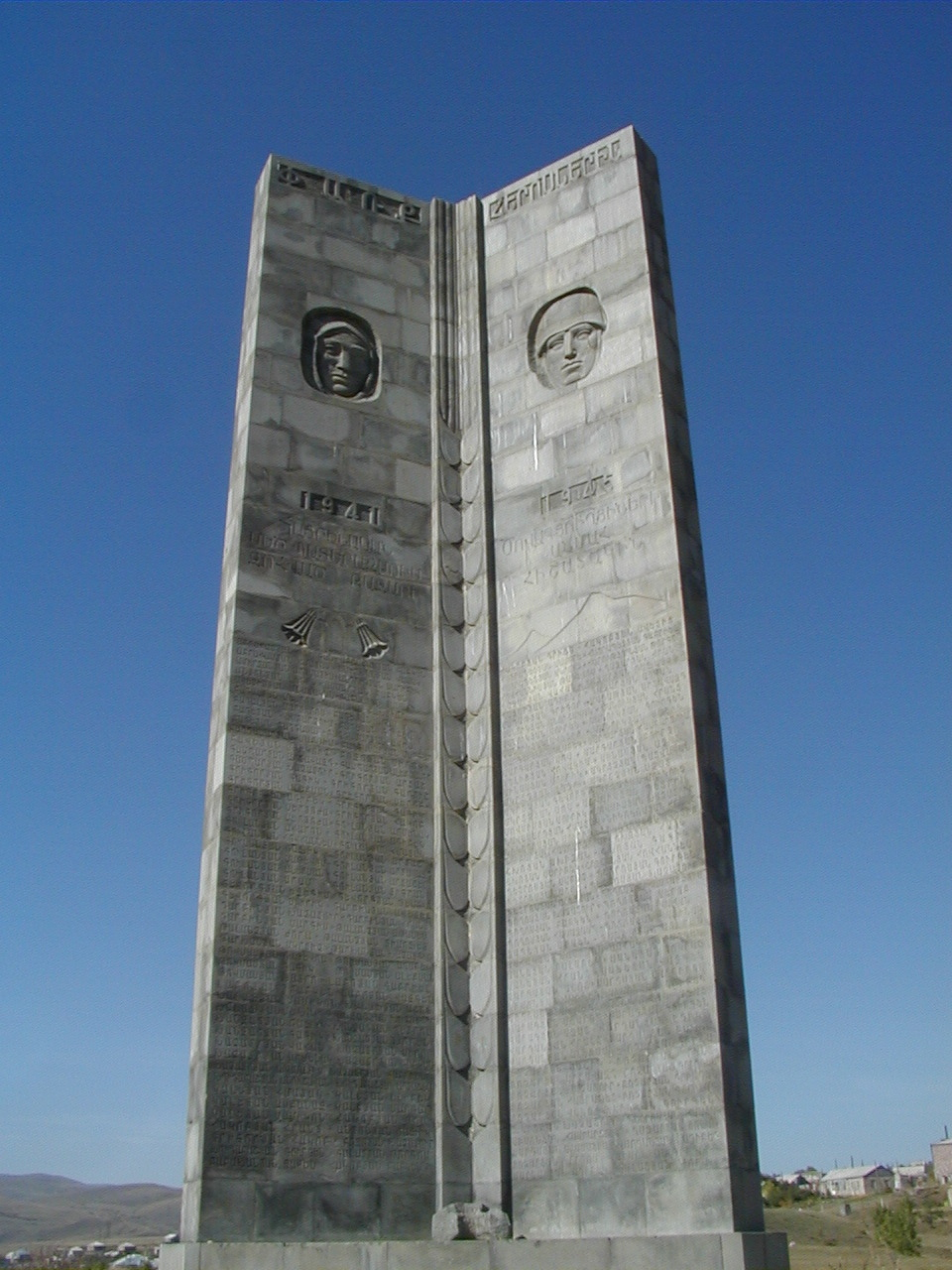
World War II monument

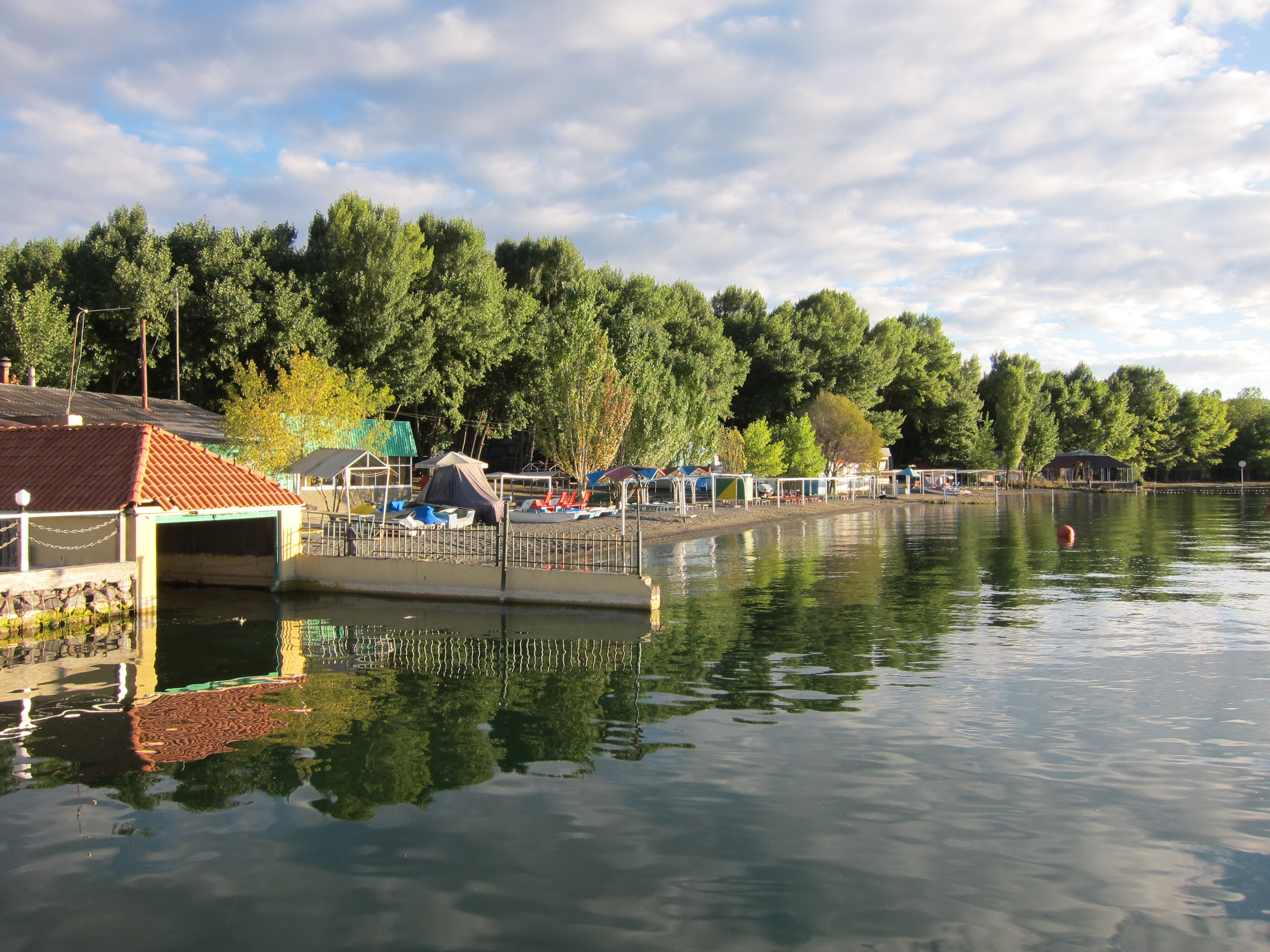
Resort on Lake Sevan

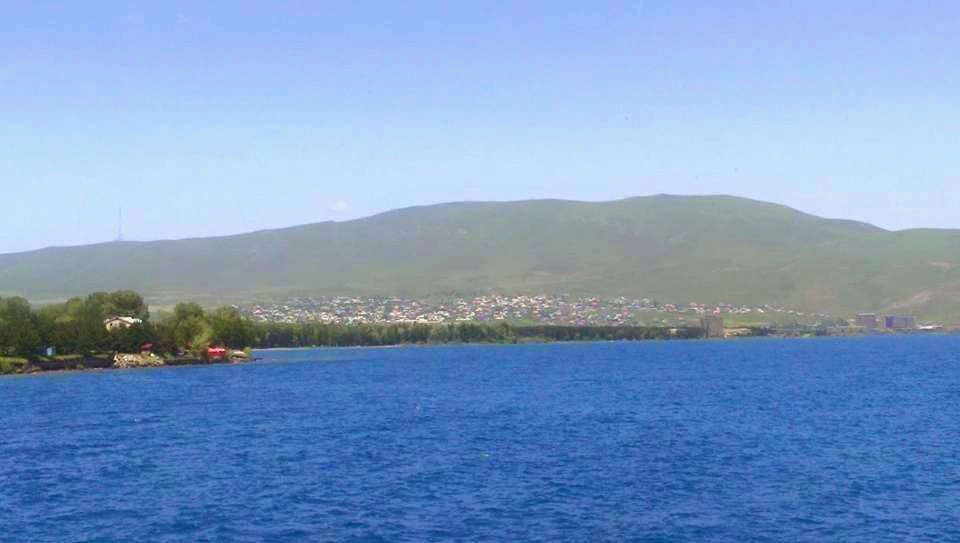
A view of Tsovagyugh and Lake Sevan

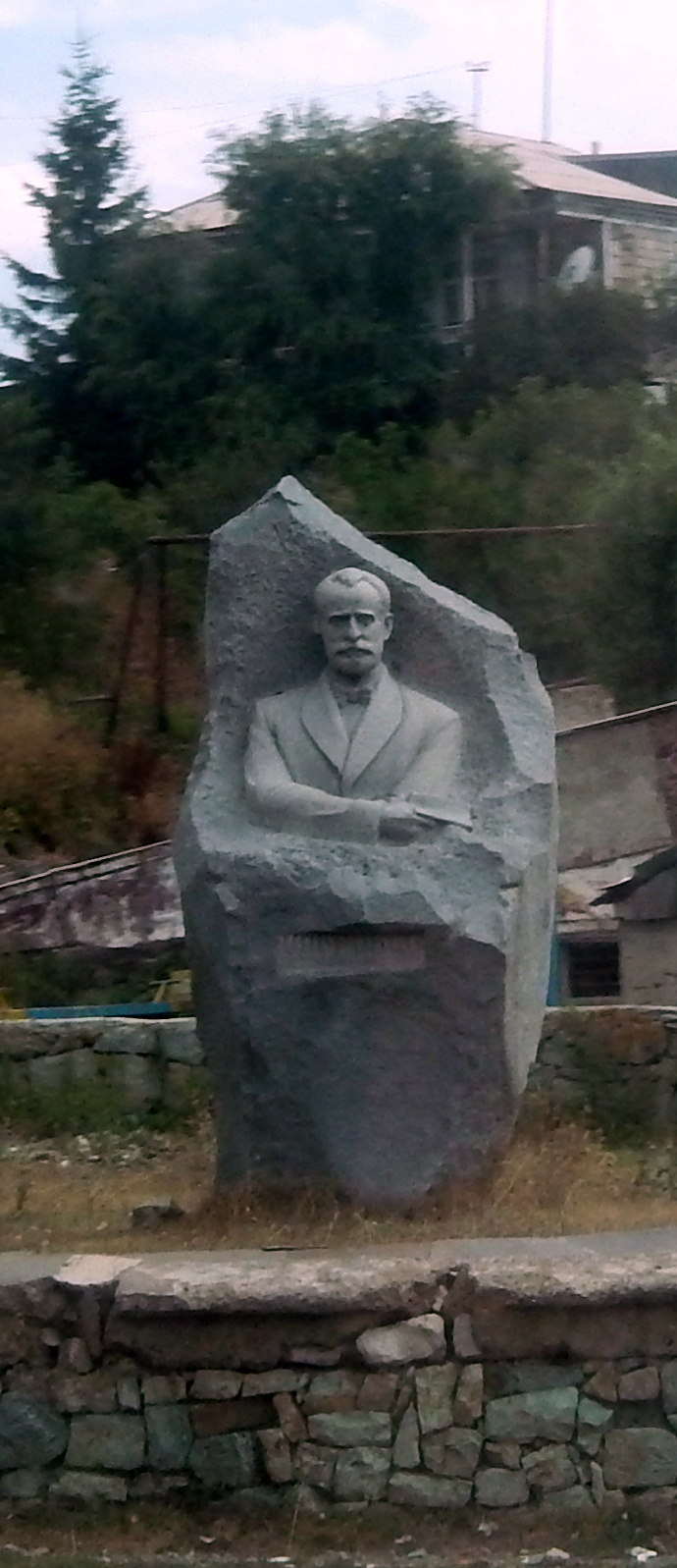
A monument in honor of Muratsan
