= Shirakavan (municipality) =

Village in Shirak, Armenia

Shirakavan Շիրակավան
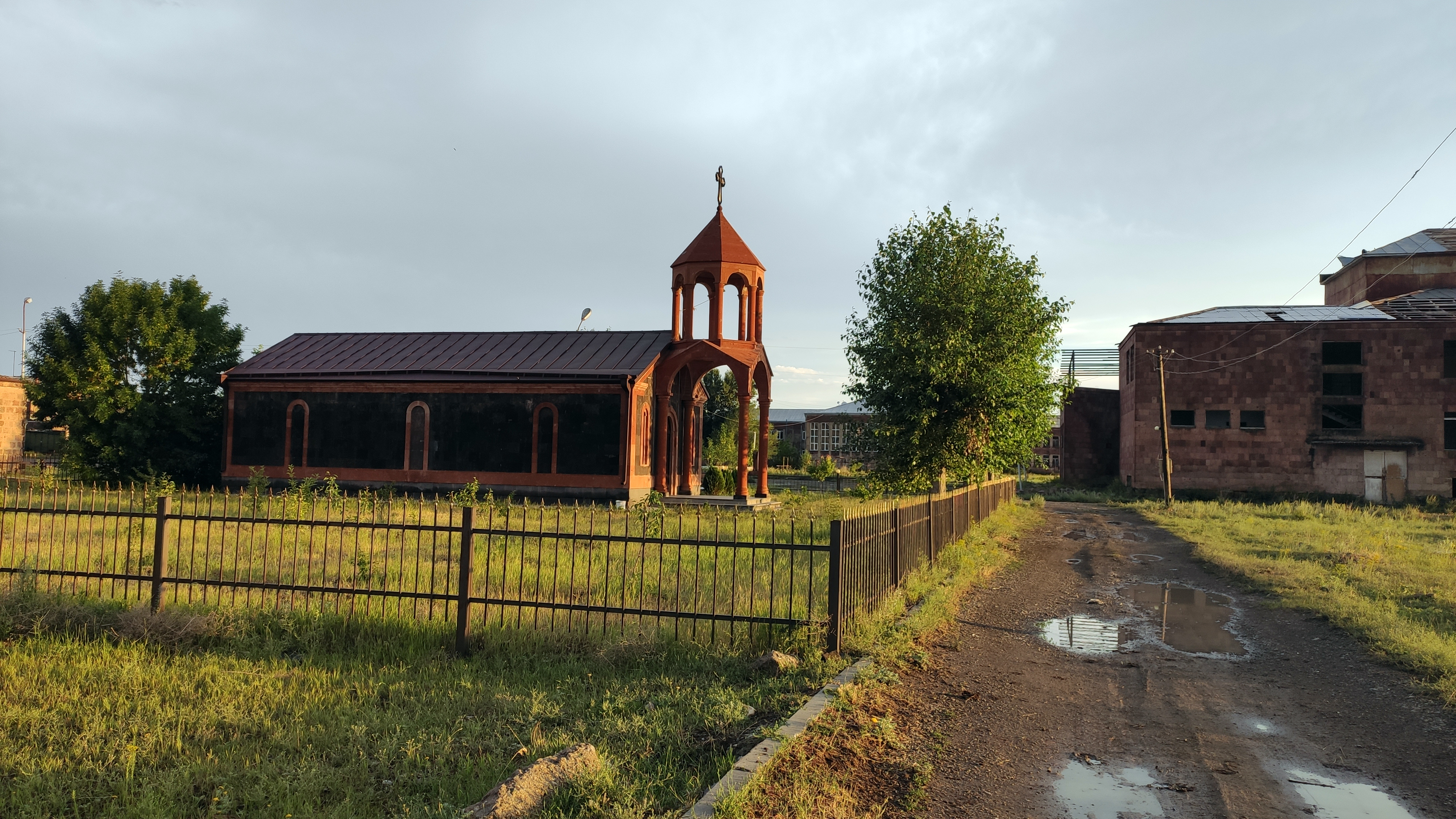

- Location within Armenia Location within Shirak
- Coordinates: 40°39′33″N 43°44′19″E
- Country: Armenia
- Province: Shirak
- Municipality: Ani
- Established: 1976

Government
  - Mayor: Marat Mkrtchyan

Area
  - Total: 18.7 km^{2} (7.2 sq mi)
- Elevation: 1,510 m (4,950 ft)

Population (2011)
  - Total: 698
- Time zone: UTC+4
- Postal code: 2909

Shirakavan (Armenian: Շիրակավան) is a village in the Ani Municipality of the Shirak Province of Armenia, near the border of Turkey.

== Demographics ==
The population of the village since 1831 is as follows:

Historical population
Year	Pop.	±% p.a.
1831	403	—
1897	903	+1.23%
1926	685	−0.95%
1939	786	+1.06%
1959	454	−2.71%
1970	426	−0.58%
1979	432	+0.16%
1989	933	+8.00%
2001	743	−1.88%
2011	698	−0.62%
