= Tsaghkunk, Armavir =

Village in Armavir, Armenia

Tsaghkunk Ծաղկունք
- Location within Armenia
- Coordinates: 40°10′46″N 44°16′12″E
- Country: Armenia
- Marz (Province): Armavir

Population (2011)
  - Total: 1,144
- Time zone: UTC+4 ( )
  - Summer (DST): UTC+5 ( )

Tsaghkunk Armavir, village entrance

Tsaghkunk (Armenian: Ծաղկունք, also Romanized as Tsaghkunk’, Tsaghkunq, and Tsakhkunk; until 1946, Abdurahman; formerly, Verkhnyaya Aylanlu and Verin Aylanlu) is a town in the Armavir Province of Armenia. The town's church dates from the 19th century.

== See also ==
- Armavir Province
