= Horom, Armenia =

Village in Shirak, Armenia

Horom Հոռոմ
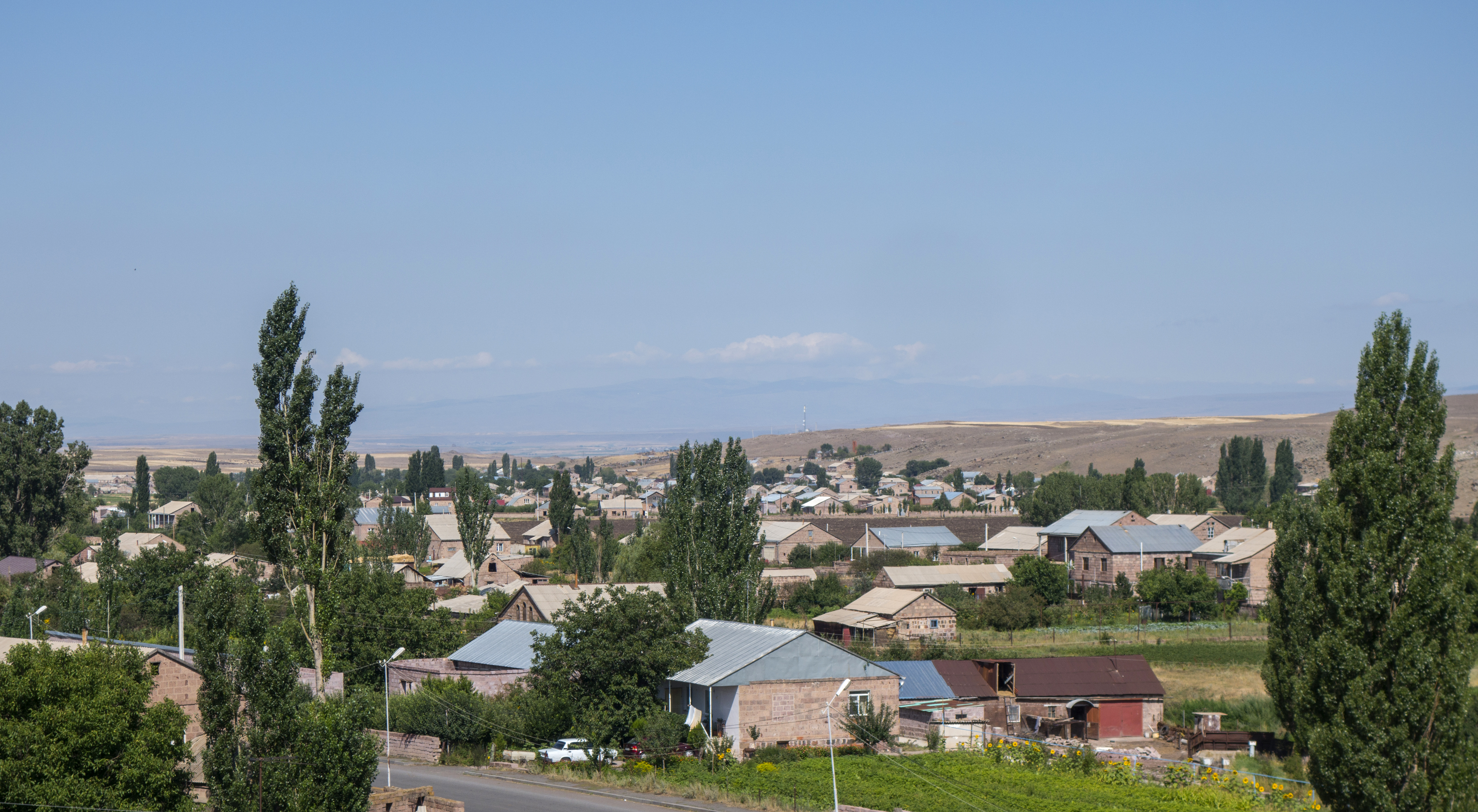

- Location within Armenia Location within Shirak
- Coordinates: 40°39′15″N 43°52′56″E
- Country: Armenia
- Province: Shirak
- Municipality: Artik

Population (2011)
  - Total: 2,032
- Time zone: UTC+4
  - Summer (DST): UTC+5

Horom (Armenian: Հոռոմ) is a village in the Artik Municipality of the Shirak Province of Armenia. Located 1 km east of Horom and situated upon two large hills south of the main road and opposite of the dam and reservoir is the ancient Bronze Age through Urartian Citadel of Horom.

Not far from this location in Ghak and Shvaghtapa are two Urartian cyclopean forts.

== Demographics ==
Historical population
| Year | Pop. | ±% p.a. |
|---|---|---|
| 1831 | 459 | — |
| 1897 | 1,939 | +2.21% |
| 1926 | 1,564 | −0.74% |
| 1939 | 1,867 | +1.37% |
| 1949 | 1,660 | −1.17% |
| 1970 | 1,949 | +0.77% |
| 1979 | 1,841 | −0.63% |
| 2001 | 2,166 | +0.74% |
| 2011 | 2,032 | −0.64% |

== Development programs ==
Horom village became part of COAF-supported villages (Children of Armenia Fund).

The programs implemented include: Student Councils, Debate Clubs, Health and Lifestyle Education, School Nutrition & Brushodromes, Women Health Screenings, Support for Reproductive Health.

Children of Armenia Fund also renovated village facilities such as Cafeteria and Brushodrome.
