= Karmravor Church =

Church in Ashtarak, Armenia

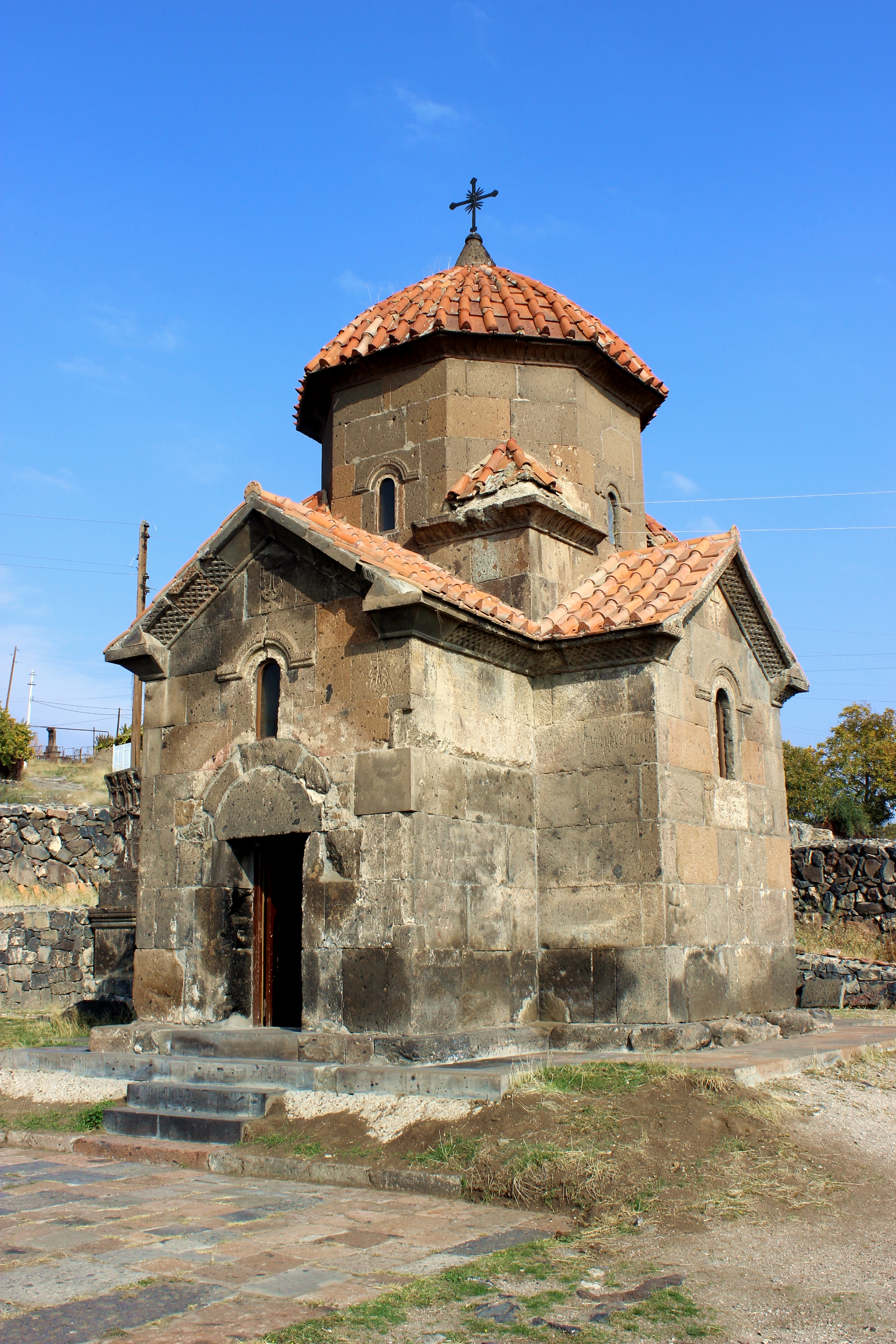
- The church in October 2014

- Location within Armenia Location within Aragatsotn

Religion
- Affiliation: Armenian Apostolic Church

Location
- Location: Ashtarak, Aragatsotn Province, Armenia
- Coordinates: 40.299628°N 44.365417°E

Architecture
- Type: Small cruciform central-plan
- Style: Armenian
- Completed: 7th century
- Dome: 1

Karmravor (Armenian: Կարմրավոր եկեղեցի; meaning "reddish" because of the colour of its dome), also known as the Church of Holy Mother of God (Սուրբ Աստվածածին, Surb Astvatsatsin) is a 7th-century Armenian Apostolic church in the town of Ashtarak in the Aragatsotn Province, Armenia.

== Architecture ==
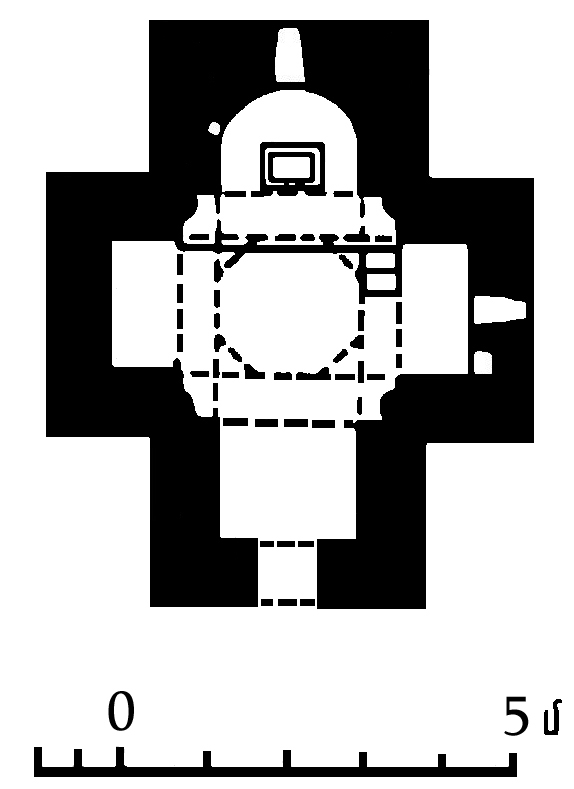
Plan of Karmaravor church

Surp Astvatsatsin is a small building with a cruciform central-plan and a dome with an octagonal drum and a Byzantine-style red tile roof. It measures only 19 feet 7 inches by 24 feet 6 inches, and is simply decorated with geometric and foliage patterns around the eaves and cornices. The apse is horseshoe shaped. Many of the original tiles on the roof which were laid on mortar have remained intact, and the church has had only some minor restoration during the 1950s by the Soviet Union authorities in the Armenian Soviet Socialist Republic, though they did retain the original red clay roof tiles. A 19th century painting of Saint Sargis the General was hung in the church and in 2025, was loaned to the National Gallery of Armenia for public display.. During communist control, the church's 7th century wall murals were whited out but were gradually restored between 2013 and 2017.

According to Jean-Michel Thierry, a French historian specialising in Armenian art, Surp Astvatsatsin marks a turning point in Armenian architecture, with its plan in the shape of a cross with a single dome setting a style that would be repeated over the centuries in spite of other influences. Other churches of a similar style attributed to the 6th or 7th century are St. Marine of Artik, Lmbatavank, St. Astvatsatsin of Talin, and St. Astvatsatsin of Voskepar.

== Gallery ==
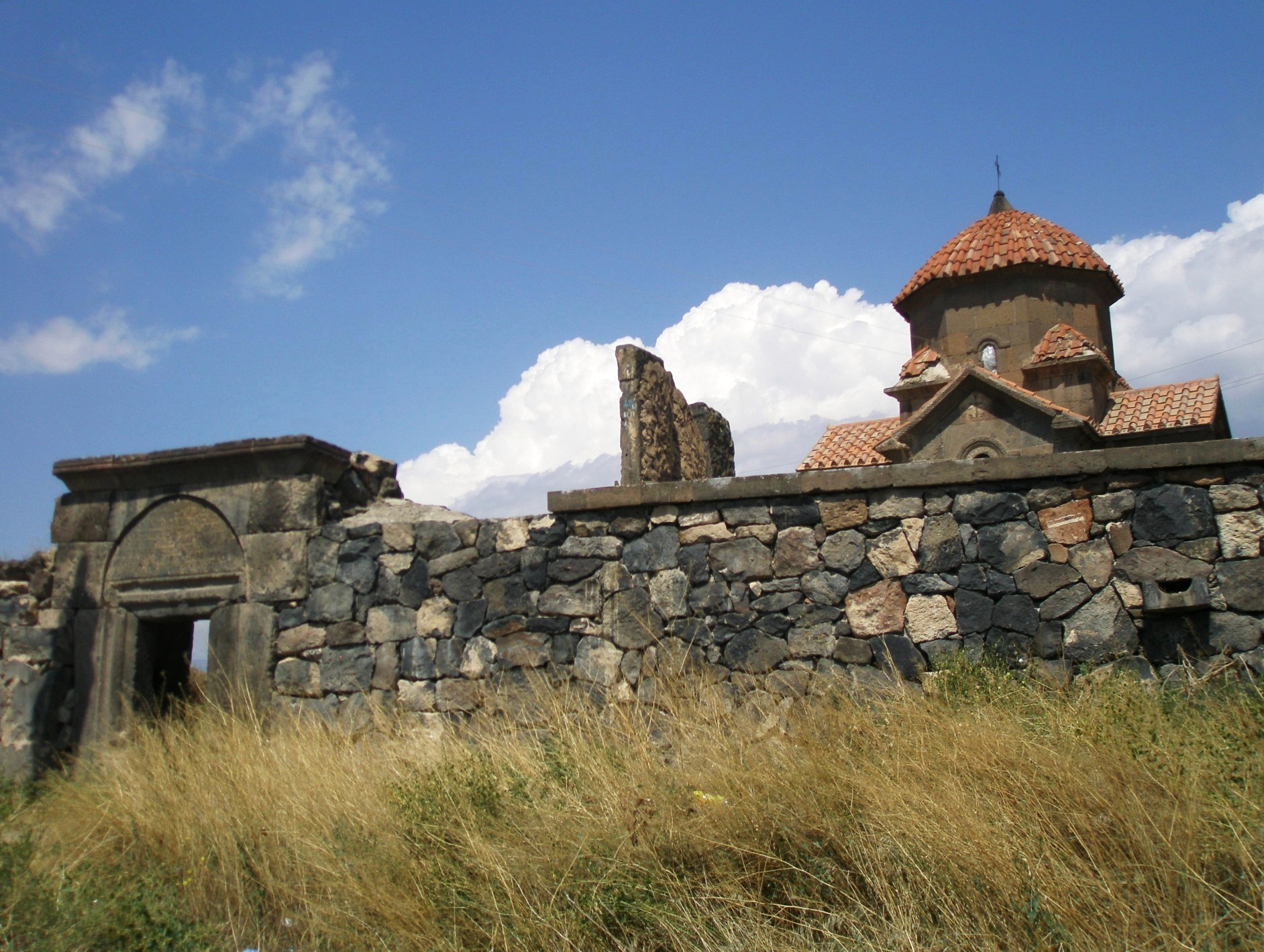

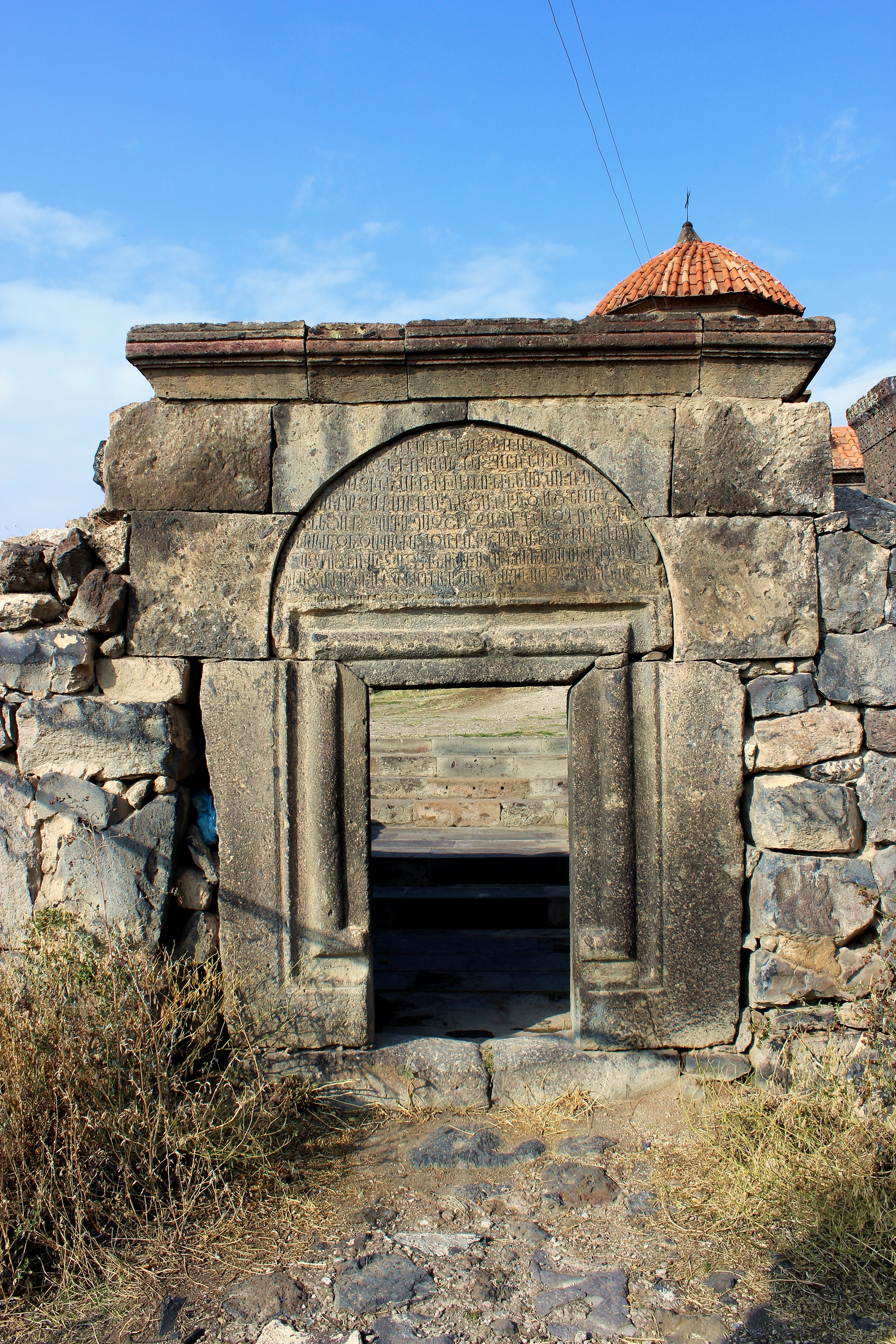

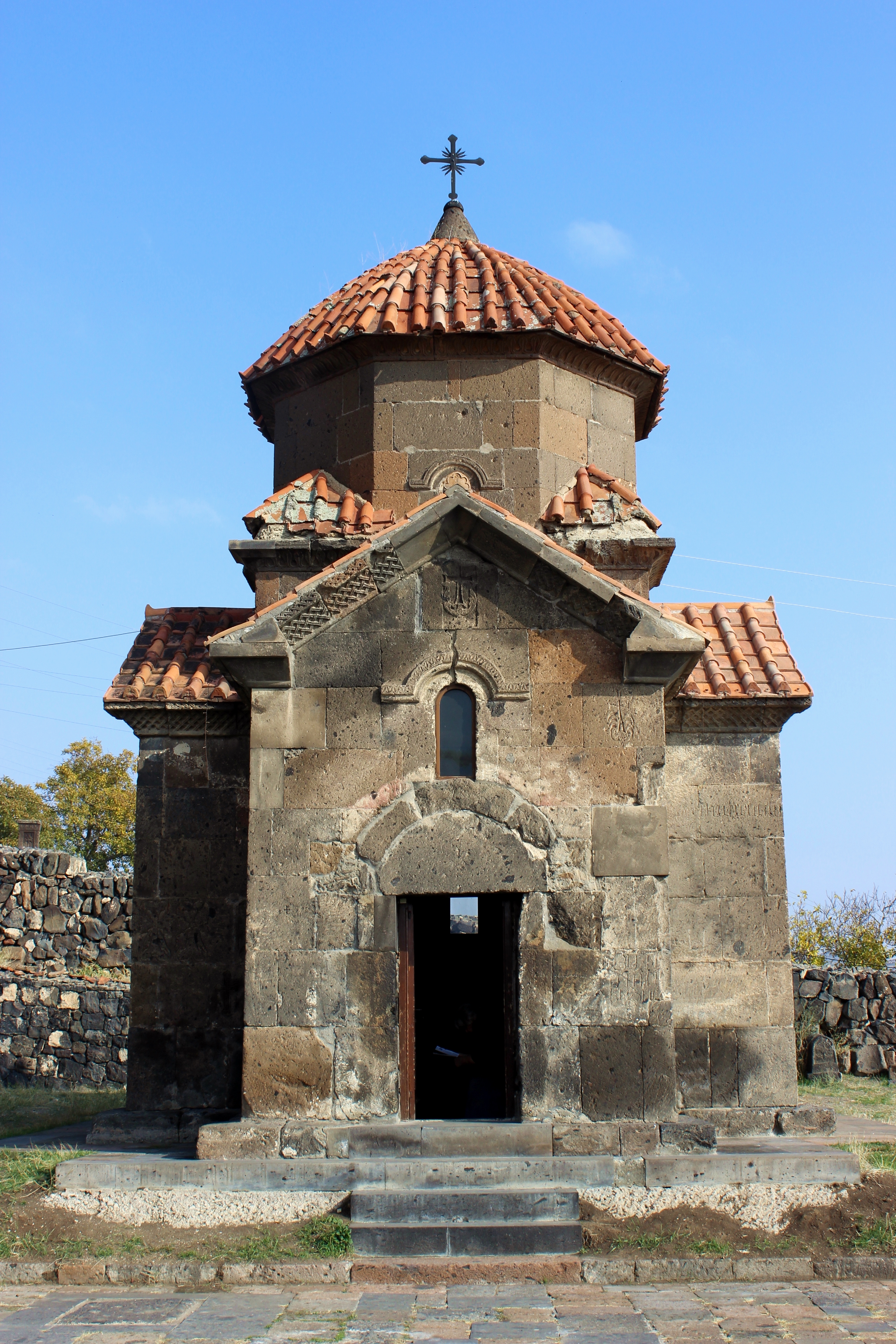

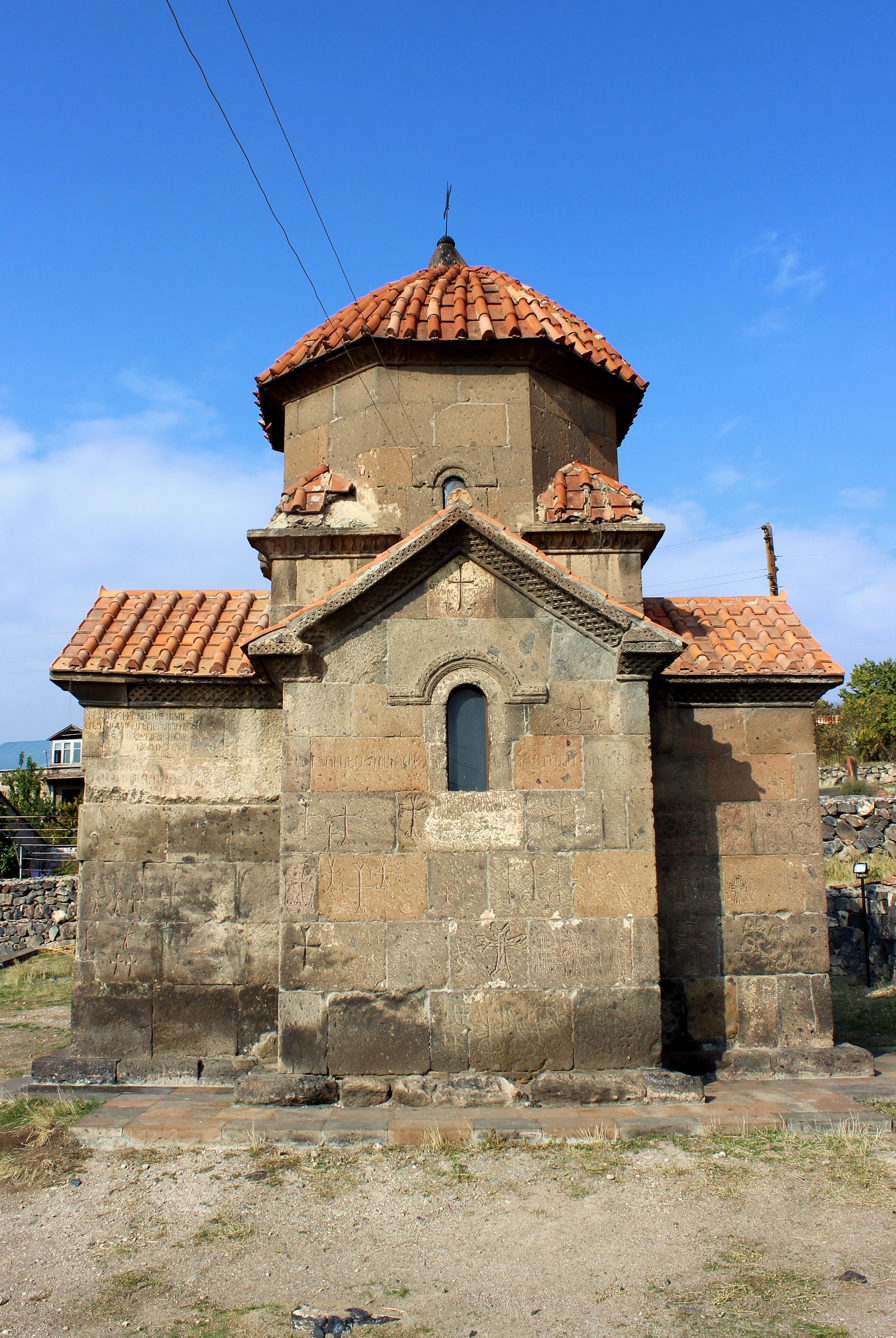

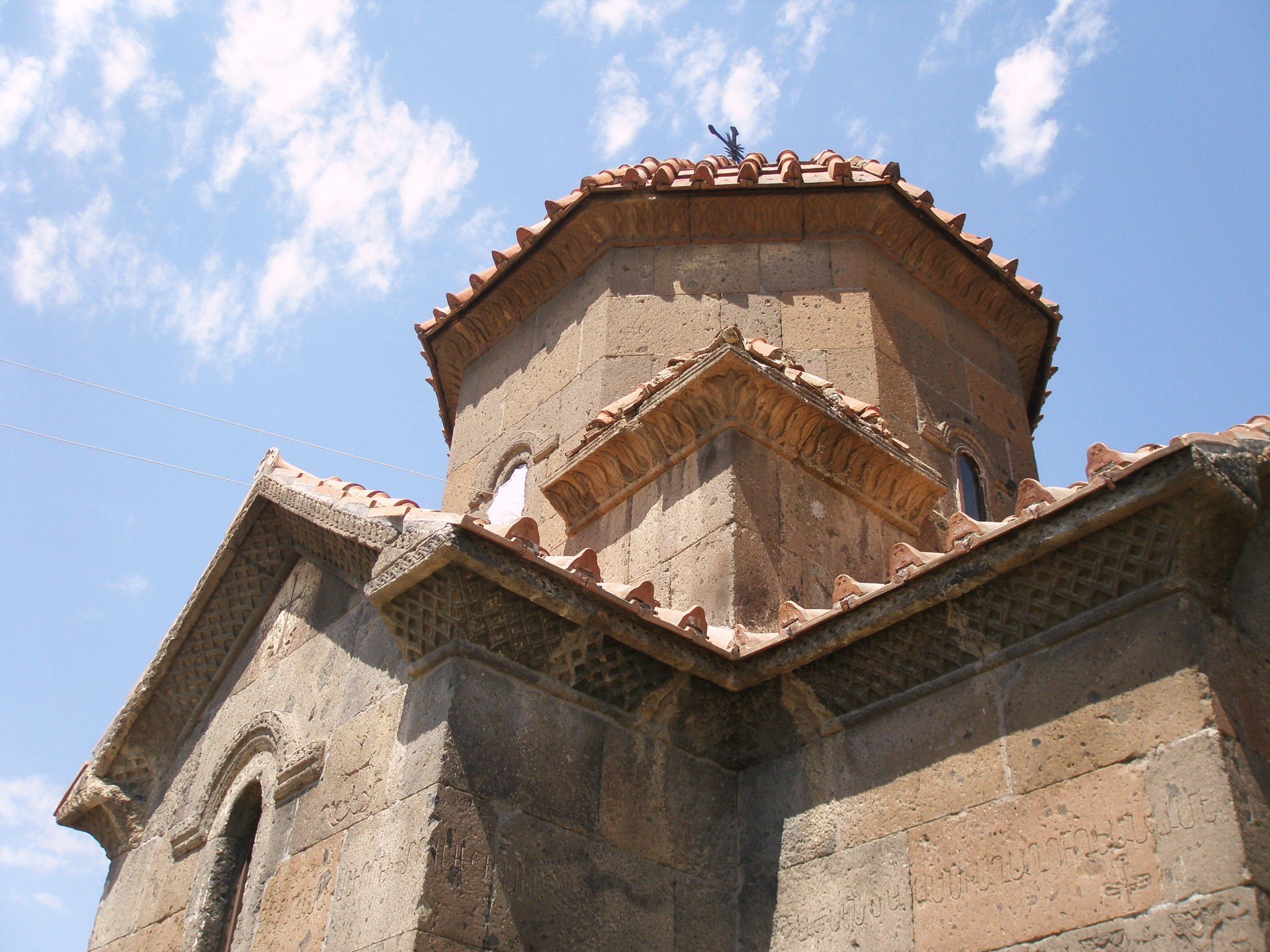

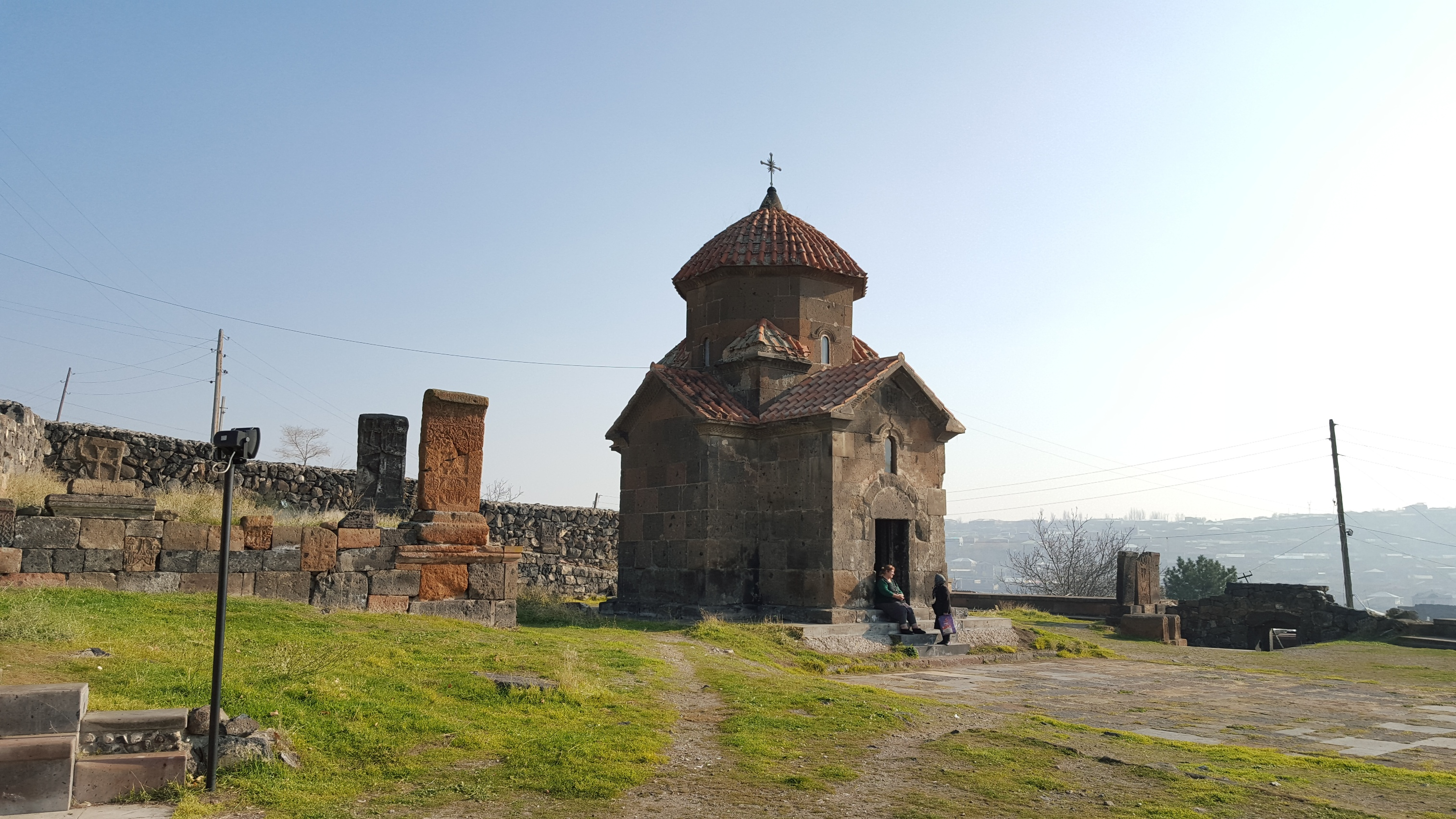

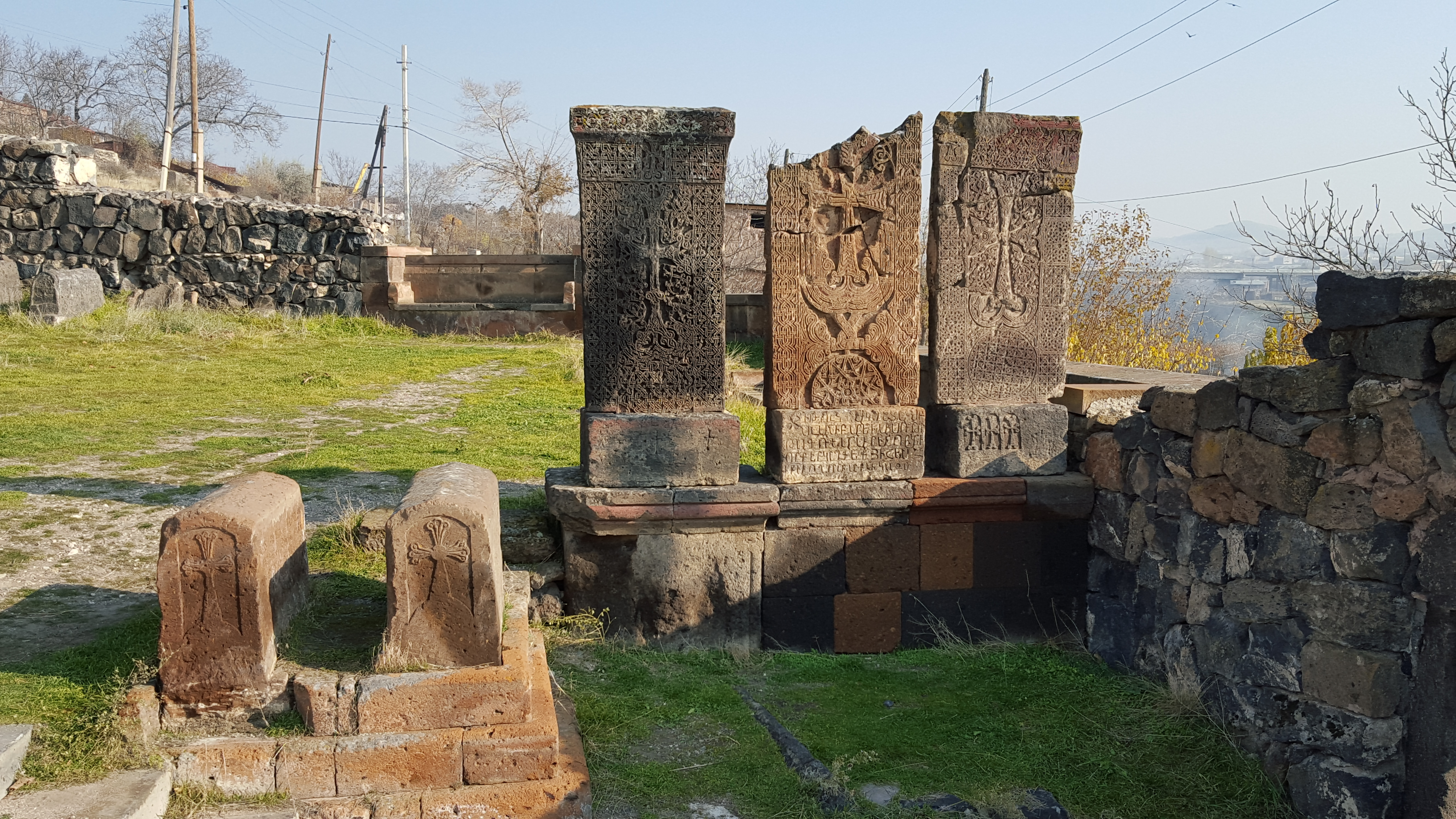
Khachkars

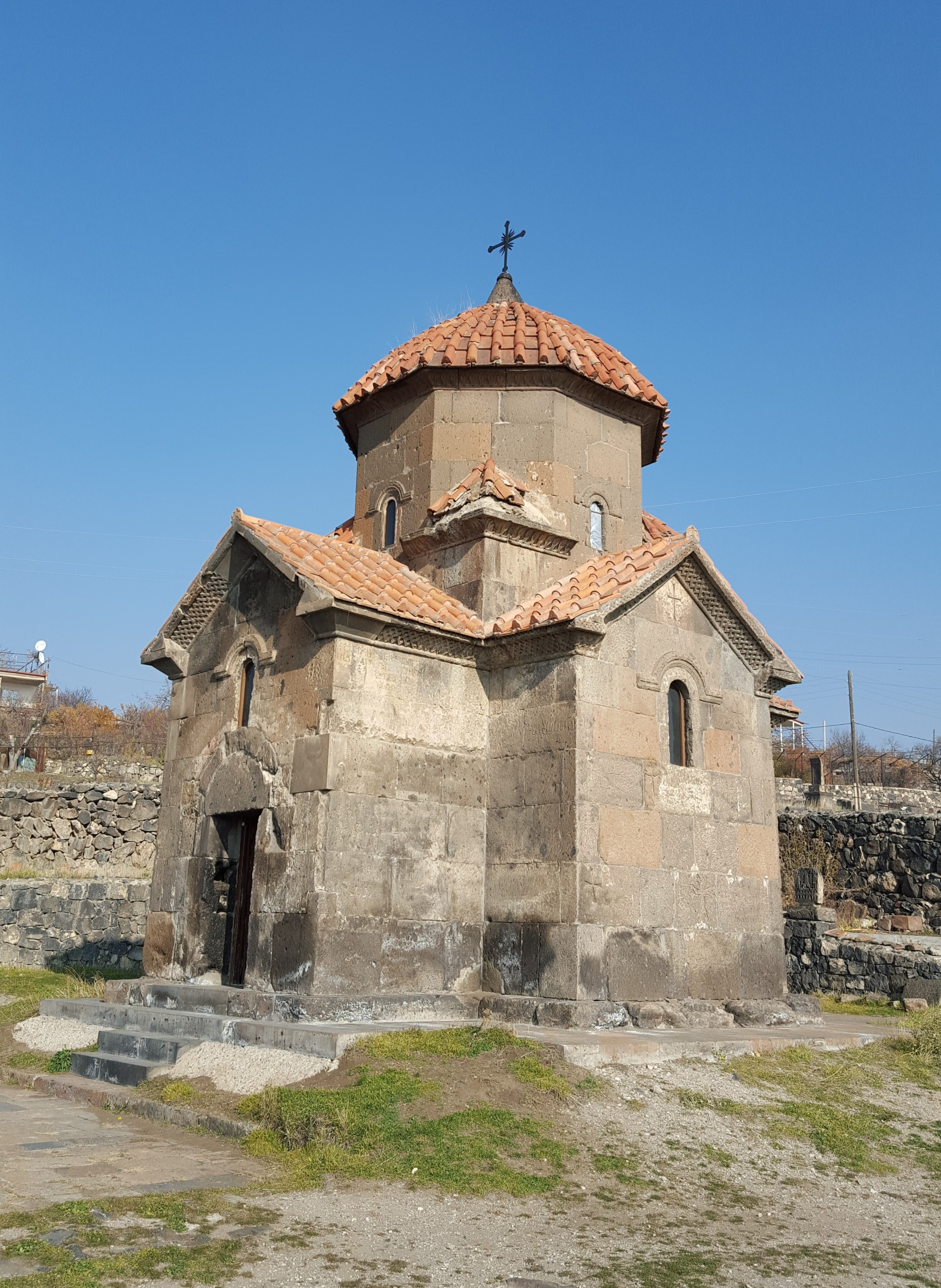

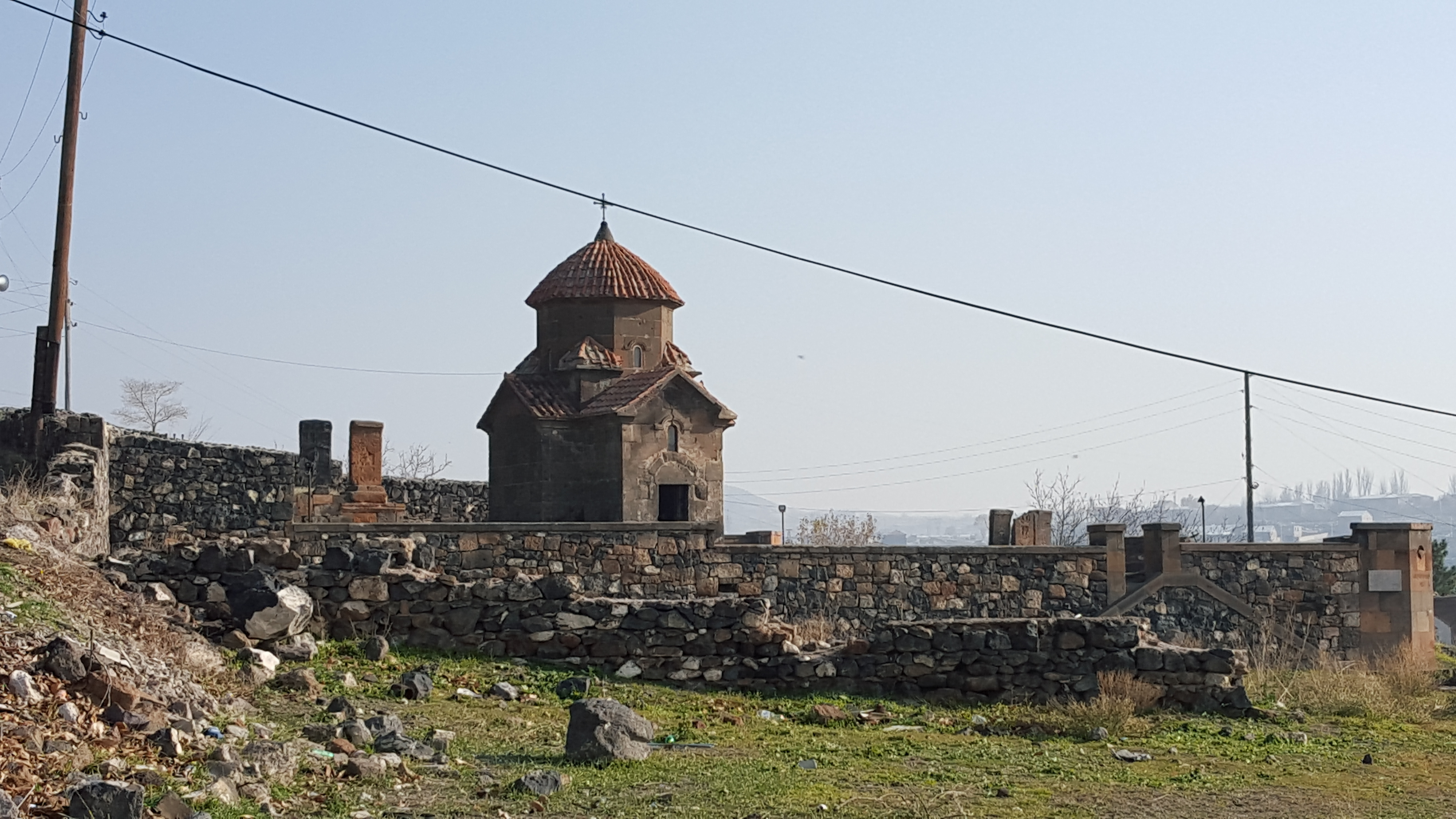

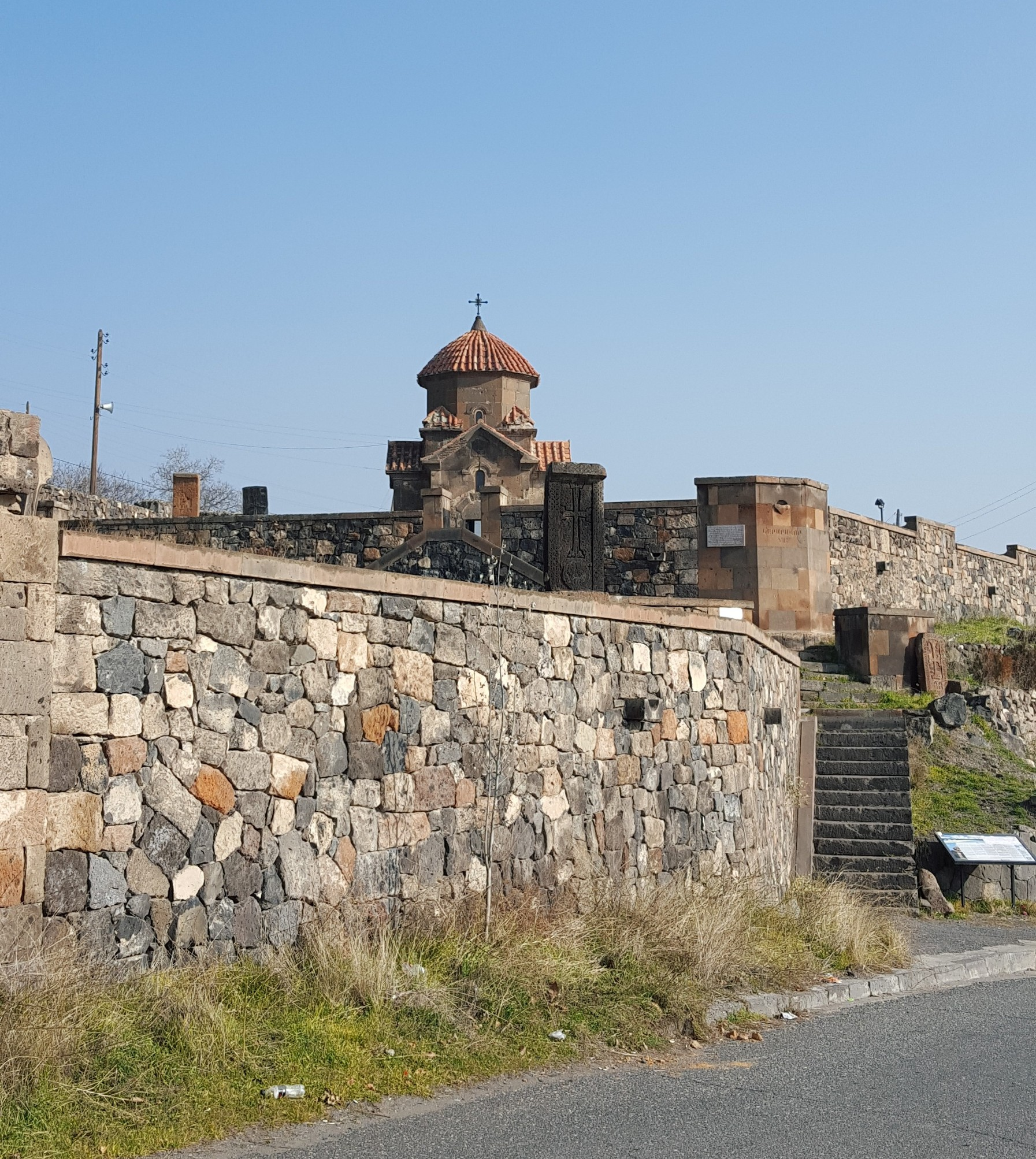
