= Berdavan =

Berdavan may refer to:

- Berdavan, Armenia
- Berdavan Fortress
