= 2006 Armenian First League =

Football league season

The 2006 Armenian First League season started on 1 May 2006. The last matches were played on 24 October 2006. Pyunik-2 became the league champions, but because they are a reserve team they were unable to promote to the Armenian Premier League. As a result, the second placed team Lernayin Artsakh was given promotion. Due to Banants-2 and Ararat-2 finishing in third and fourth position, the fifth placed team FC Dinamo Yerevan played in the promotion/relegation play-off, which was lost in the end.

== Overview ==
- Patani representing the Armenia national under-17 football team and FC Yezerk Noyemberyan are introduced to the league.
- Esteghlal-Kotayk-2 are renamed back to Kotayk-2.
- FIMA Yerevan change their name to Hay Ari.

== League table ==
Pos	Team	Pld	W	D	L	GF	GA	GD	Pts	Promotion or qualification
1	Pyunik-2	18	14	3	1	80	11	+69	45	Champions
2	Lernayin Artsakh	18	12	3	3	57	32	+25	39	Promoted to Armenian Premier League. Champions were unable to promote.
3	Banants-2	18	11	3	4	40	16	+24	36	
4	Ararat-2	18	11	1	6	46	24	+22	34	
5	Dinamo	18	9	4	5	36	34	+2	31	Promotion/relegation play-off.
6	Patani	18	6	3	9	43	49	−6	21	
7	Gandzasar-2	18	5	4	9	33	36	−3	19	
8	Mika-2	18	4	5	9	20	24	−4	17	
9	Hay Ari	18	3	2	13	22	60	−38	11	
10	Yezerk	18	1	0	17	12	103	−91	3	
11	Kotayk-2	0	-	-	-	-	-	—	0	Withdrew before start of the season.
12	Vagharshapat	0	-	-	-	-	-	—	0	Withdrew before start of the season.
13	Lori Vanadzor	0	-	-	-	-	-	—	0	Withdrew before start of the season.
14	Yerevan United	0	-	-	-	-	-	—	0	Withdrew before start of the season.

== Promotion/relegation play-off ==
Date	Venue	PL Team	Result	FL Team
18 November	unknown	Ulisses	4 - 2	Dinamo Yerevan

== See also ==
- 2006 Armenian Premier League
- 2006 Armenian Cup
