= Noyemberyan =

City in Tavush, Armenia

Noyemberyan Նոյեմբերյան
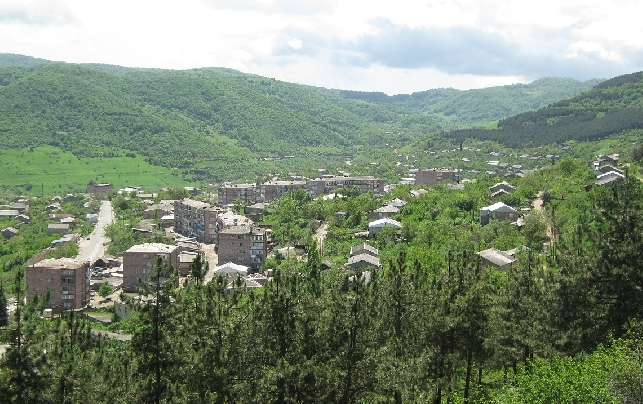
- A view of Noyemberyan

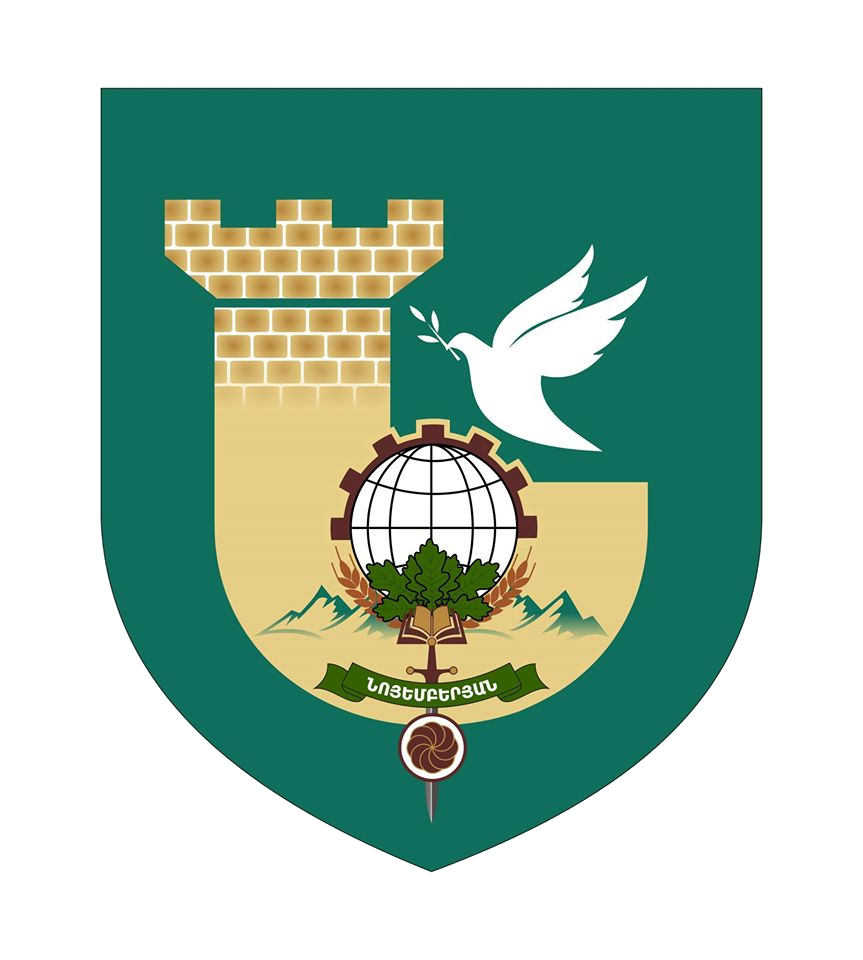
- Coat of arms

- Location within Armenia Location within Tavush
- Coordinates: 41°10′21″N 44°59′37″E
- Country: Armenia
- Province: Tavush
- Municipality: Noyemberyan
- Founded: 13th century

Area
  - Total: 3.6 km^{2} (1.4 sq mi)
- Elevation: 820 m (2,690 ft)

Population (2023)
  - Total: 4 327
  - Density: 1.1/km^{2} (2.9/sq mi)
- Time zone: UTC+4 (AMT)
- Website: Official website

Noyemberyan (Armenian: Նոյեմբերյան) is a town and urban municipal community in the Noyemberyan Municipality of the Tavush Province of Armenia. It is located 2 km west of the Armenia-Azerbaijan border and 9 km south of the Armenia-Georgia border. As of the 2011 census, the population of the town was 5,310. As per the 2023 official data, the population of Noyemberyan is 4,327.

== Etymology ==
Noyemberyan was known as Barana (Armenian: Բարանա) until 1937. According to historian Makar Barkhudaryants, the old name Barana or Parana (Armenian: Պարանա) is a dialectical form of the Armenian word aparan (Armenian: ապարան), meaning palace.

In 1938, it was renamed Noyemberyan (meaning the city of November) by the Soviets to commemorate the entry of the Soviet Red Army into Armenia that took place on November 29, 1920.

== History ==
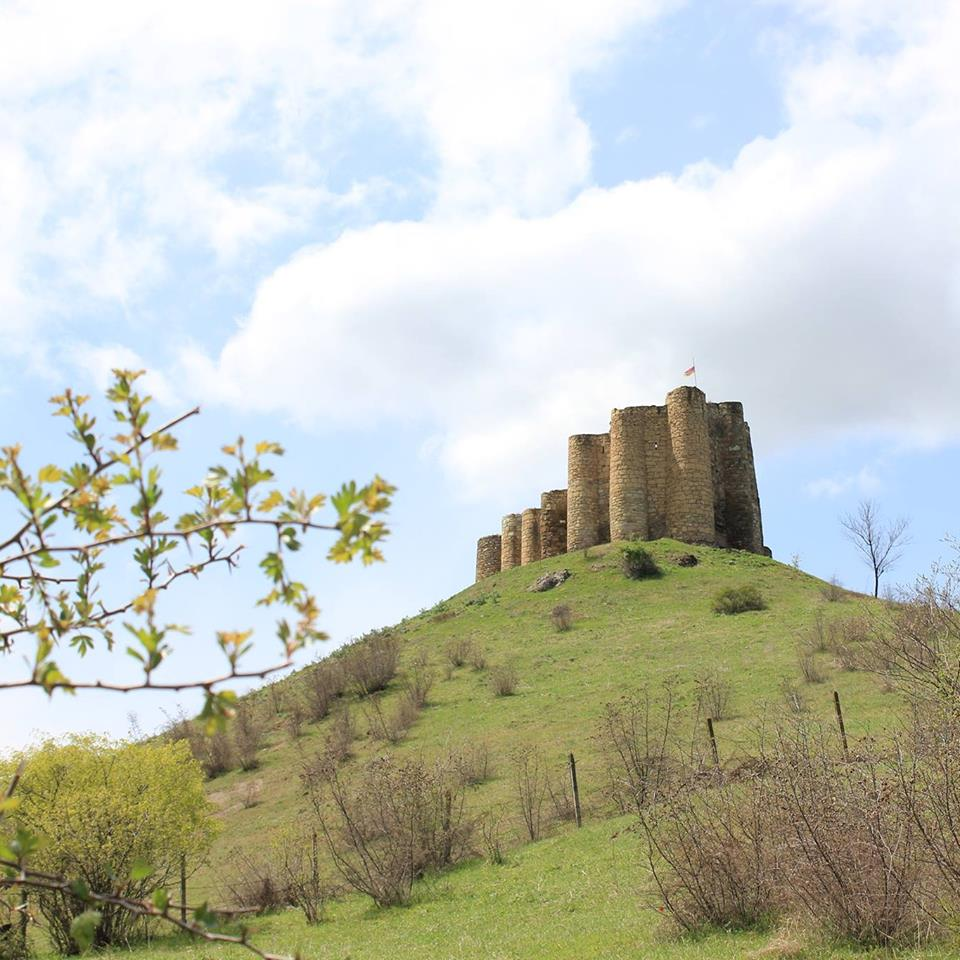
Berdavan Fortress near Noyemberyan

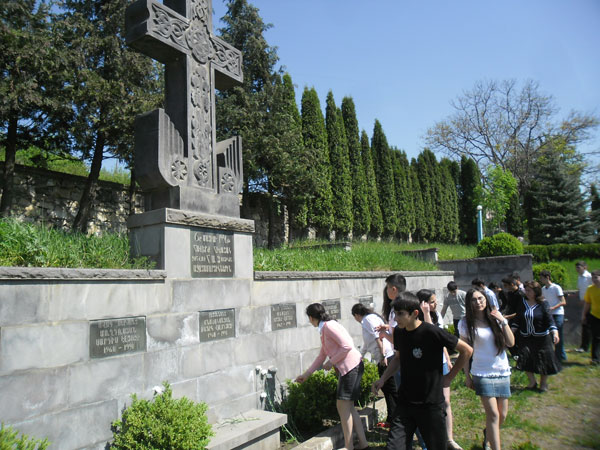
Memorial to the fallen in the Nagorno-Karabakh conflict in Noyemberyan

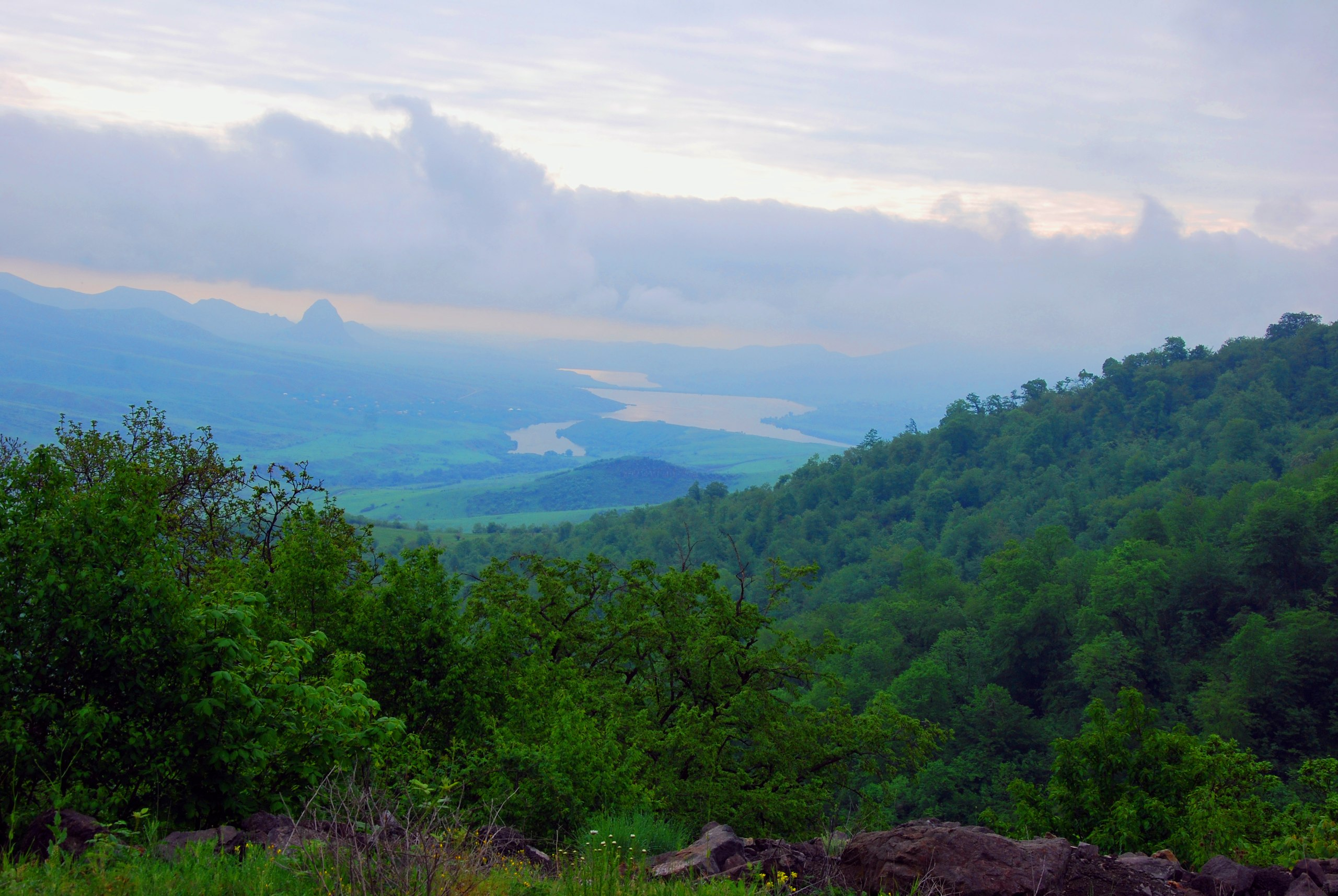
Noyemberyan countryside

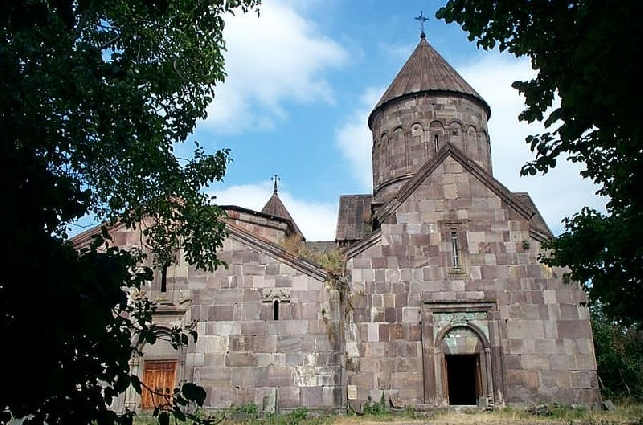
Makaravank near Noyemberyan

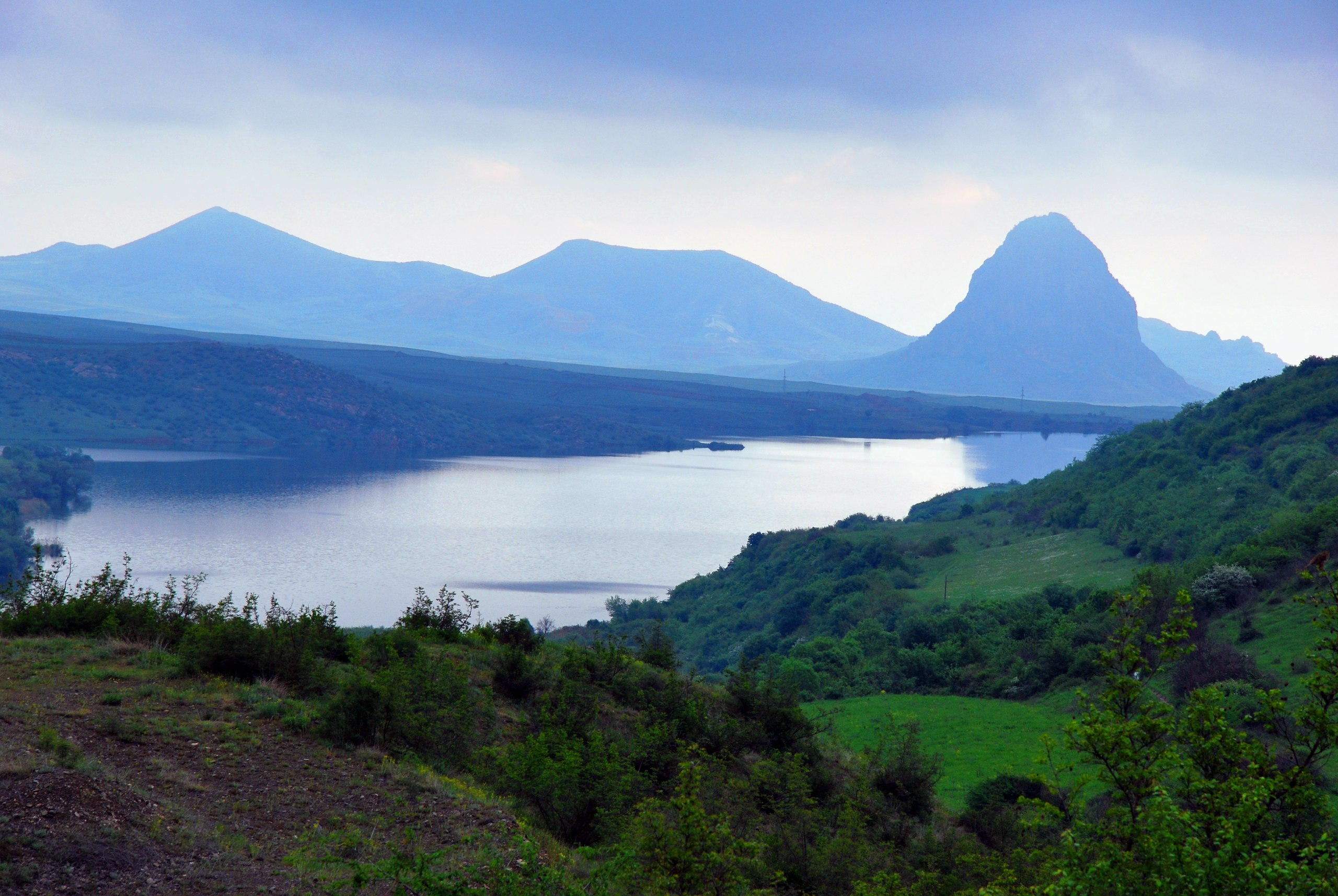
Scenery around Noyemberyan

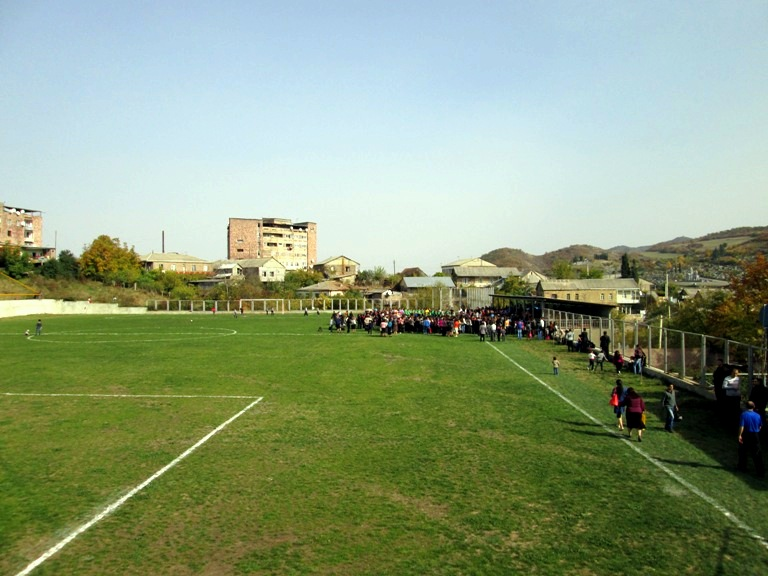
Noyemberyan City Stadium

Historically, the area of modern-day Noyemberyan was part of the Koghbapor (Armenian: Կողբափոր) canton of Gugark, the 13th province of Greater Armenia. Not much information is known about the origins of the settlement. However, the region was part of the Kingdom of Tashir-Dzoraget between the 10th and 12th centuries. The region was devastated during the Mongol invasions in 1236. Later, it was ruled by the Zakarids in the 13–14th centuries.

The 13th-century Mshkavank Monastery and Surp Sarkis Church, which are located in the immediate vicinity of the town, suggest that the settlement was formed during the 13th century.

In 1501–02, most of the Eastern Armenian territories including the settlement of Barana (modern-day Noyemberyan) were swiftly conquered by the emerging Safavid dynasty of Iran led by Shah Ismail I.

The territories of present-day Lori and Tavush provinces along with the neighboring Georgia, became part of the Russian Empire in 1800–01. The territories became an official region of Russia as per the Treaty of Gulistan signed between Imperial Russia and Qajar Persia in October 1813, following the Russo-Persian War of 1804–13. In 1840, the Elizavetpol uezd was formed and most of the territories of Tavush became part of the newly founded administrative division of the Russian Empire. Later in 1868, the Elisabethpol Governorate was established and Tavush became part of the newly formed Kazakh uezd of the governorate.

After the short-lived independent Armenia in 1918–20, the Soviet Red Army entered the Armenian village of Barana on 29 November 1920 and the Armenian Soviet Socialist Republic was officially declared on 2 December 1920. In 1937, the Noyemberyan raion of Soviet Armenia was formed. One year later, the village Barana was renamed Noyemberyan to become the centre of the raion. In 1971, Noyemberyan received the status of an urban-type settlement. During the Soviet days, food-processing—mainly dairy products—was the most developed industrial sector in Noyemberyan.

Following the independence of Armenia in 1991, Noyemberyan was given the status of a town within the newly founded Tavush Province as per the administrative reforms of 1995. In 2016, the municipality of Noyemberyan was enlarged to include the nearby rural settlements of Baghanis, Barekamavan, Berdavan, Dovegh, Jujevan, Koti, Voskepar and Voskevan.

== Geography ==
Noyemberyan is located at the northeast of Armenia, on the eastern foot of the Gugark mountains, at a road distance of 187 km northeast of the capital Yerevan, and 54 km north of the provincial centre Ijevan. The border with Azerbaijan is only 2 kilometers east of the town.

Noyemberyan is situated at the southeast of the Koghb River valley, at an average height of 820 meters above sea level. It is surrounded with the Voskepar mountains from the south and the mountains of Gugark from the west.

This location is classified as Cfb by the Köppen climate classification. The average temperature of the year is 10.9 °C, in January -1.5 °C, while in July 26.7 °C. The maximum temperature registered ever in Noyemberyan is 35 °C and the minimum is -32 °C (1972). The annual precipitation is 535 mm, with the most rainy period of the year ranging between April and May.

== Demographics ==
The majority of the town's population are ethnic Armenians who belong to the Armenian Apostolic Church. The regulating body of the church is the Diocese of Tavush, based in Ijevan. The town's main Surp Sarkis church dating back to 1903 was recently renovated. The town's second Surp Anna church was opened in 2011 through the efforts of Sedrak Mamyan, a native of Noyemberyan based in Volgograd.

Historical population
Year	Pop.	±% p.a.
1831	294	—
1897	1,197	+2.15%
1926	1,901	+1.61%
1939	2,625	+2.51%
1959	3,138	+0.90%
1970	4,330	+2.97%
1980	5,115	+1.68%
1989	6,116	+2.01%
2001	5,486	−0.90%
2004	5,500	+0.08%
2011	5,310	−0.50%
2023	4,327	−1.69%

== Culture ==
The remains of a cyclopean fortress dating back to the 2nd millennium BCE was found at the northern edge of Noyemberyan. The remains of the 13th-century Jukhtakeghtsi Church are found at the south of the town while the well-preserved Mshkavank Monastery of the same period is located around 2 km southwest of Noyemberyan.

Currently, the community of Noyemberyan is served by a cultural centre, a public library, an art school and a school of music.

Noyemberyan has the local "Kamut TV" station (since 1994) and "Tavush TV" also based in Noyemberyan (since 2010). The regional Ijevan TV is also well received in Noyemberyan.

== Economy ==
Noyemberyan was an important centre of food and dairy products during the Soviet years. Currently, the town has small plants for canned food, dairy products, flour and bakery products. There are also small firms for furniture, plastic products and candles. The nearby settlement of Berdavan is home to the Berdavan wine Factory.

Many of the citizens of Noyemberyan are involved in agriculture. Surrounded with fertile farms, the main crops include peach and grape. Iron and copper mines are found near Noyemberyan.

Tourism is among the growing sectors in the region. The town has many boutique hotels as well as B&Bs.

== Education ==
Currently, Noyemberyan is home to 2 public education school as well as 2 pre-school kindergartens.

Noyemberyan is also home to a state intermediate college run by the Ministry of Education and Science of Armenia.

== Sport ==
Football is the most popular sport in Noyemberyan. Aznavour FC founded in 1981, represented the town in domestic football competitions until 1997 when the club was dissolved due to financial difficulties.

The football field of Noyemberyan known as the "Central" during the Soviet times, was reconstructed between 2008 and 2013 with many intervals. Finally, the new Noyemberyan City Stadium was opened on 18 October 2013, with a capacity of 100 seats only. It is envisaged to install a permanent stand at the northern side of the pitch to increase the capacity up to 1,500 seats.

The town has a children and youth sport school run by the municipality.

== Transportation ==
The Ayrum border checkpoint and railway station on the Yerevan-Tbilisi highway, is around 22 km east of Noymeberyan. The town is connected with the main highway as well as the surrounding towns and villages, through the H-26 regional road.

== Notable people ==
- Narek Beglaryan, former footballer
