= FC Yezerk =

Armenian football club

- Full name: Football Club Yezerk
- Founded: 2006; 19 years ago
- Dissolved: 2007; 18 years ago
- Ground: Noyemberyan City Stadium, Noyemberyan, Armenia
- Capacity: 100

FC Yezerk (Armenian: Ֆուտբոլային Ակումբ Եզերք), is a defunct Armenian football club from Noyemberyan, Tavush Province. The club was founded in 2006 and dissolved in 2007 due to financial difficulties and is currently inactive from professional football. Their home stadium was the Noyemberyan City Stadium (formerly known as the Central).
