= Aznavour FC =

Aznavour
- Full name: Aznavour Football Club
- Founded: 1981; 44 years ago
- Dissolved: 1997; 28 years ago
- Ground: Noyemberyan City Stadium, Noyemberyan
- Capacity: 100

Aznavour FC (Armenian: Ազնավուր Ֆուտբոլային Ակումբ), is a defunct Armenian football club from Noyemberyan, Tavush Province.

== History ==
The club was founded in 1981 as Pahatsoyagorts Noyemberyan FC and played their home games at the Noyemberyan Tsentralny Stadium. After the independence of Armenia, the club was renamed Aznavour FC in honour of the French-Armenian singer and composer Charles Aznavour.

However, the club was dissolved in early 1997 due to financial difficulties and is currently inactive from professional football.

== League record ==
Year	Club Name	Division	Position	GP	W	D	L	GS	GA	PTS
1990	Pahatsoyagorts Noyemberyan	Armenian SSR League	9	32	11	7	14	40	69	29
1991	Pahatsoyagorts Noyemberyan	Armenian SSR League	10	38	15	5	18	51	64	35
1992	Aznavour FC	Armenian Premier League	17	22	11	5	6	42	29	27
1993	Aznavour FC	Armenian First League	2	20	13	1	6	45	21	27
1994	Aznavour FC	Armenian Premier League	8	28	11	3	14	43	72	25
1995	Aznavour FC	Armenian Premier League	3	10	4	1	5	10	14	13
1995/96	Aznavour FC	Armenian Premier League	12	22	0	2	20	19	82	2
1996–97	Aznavour FC	Armenian First League	3	22	12	6	4	35	24	42
1997–present	-	no participation	-	-	-	-	-	-	-	-
