= Noyemberyan City Stadium =

Football stadium in Armenia

Coordinates: 41°10′21″N 44°59′53″E

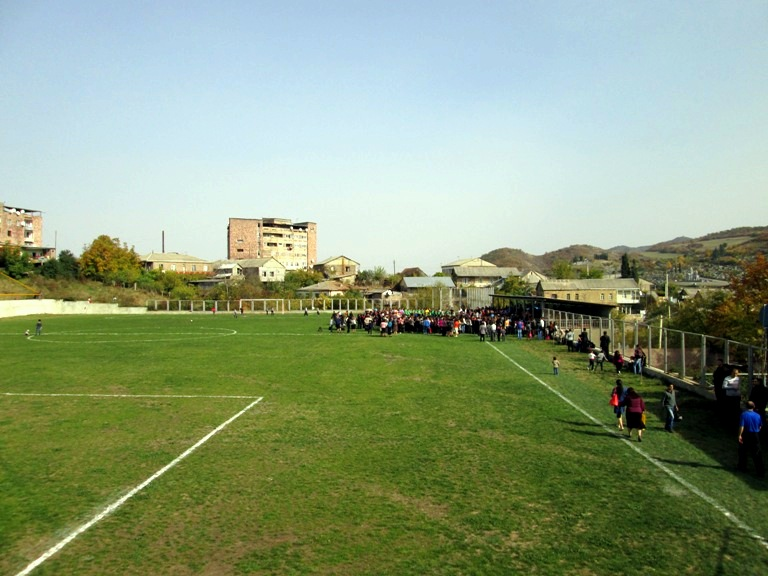
- Interactive map of Noyemberyan City Stadium
- Full name: Noyemberyan City Stadium
- Former names: Central
- Location: Noyemberyan, Armenia
- Owner: Noyemberyan Town Council
- Capacity: 100 (future 1,500)
- Surface: grass
- Field size: 100 x 64 meters

Construction
- Opened: 18 October 2013 (reopened)

Tenants
- Aznavour (1981-1997); Yezerk (2006-2007)

Noyemberyan City Stadium (Armenian: Նոյեմբերյանի քաղաքային մարզադաշտ) is a football stadium in Noyemberyan, Tavush Province, Armenia.

== Overview ==
The football field of Noyemberyan, known as the "Central" during Soviet times, was renovated between 2008 and 2013. Finally, the new Noyemberyan City Stadium was opened on 18 October 2013, with a capacity of 100 seats only. It is envisaged to install a permanent stand at the northern side of the pitch to increase the capacity up to 1,500 seats.

The total cost of the stadium was equal to AMD 165 million.

The pitch was the home venue of Aznavour FC of Noyemberyan. The club used the stadium for domestic competitions between 1981 and 1997 when it was dissolved due to financial difficulties.

It is currently used as a training centre for the youth football teams of the region.
