= Berdavan, Armenia =

Berdavan Բերդավան
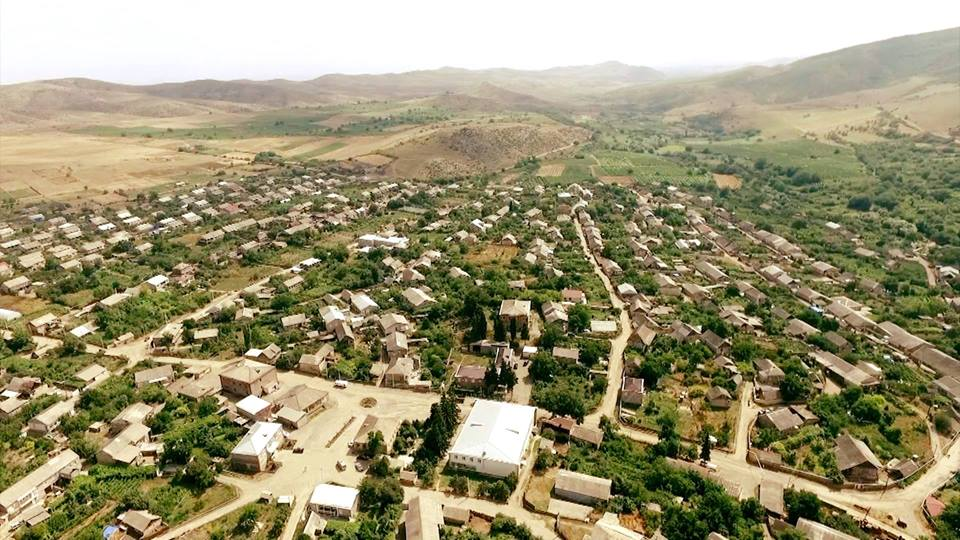
- A view of Berdavan

- Location within Armenia Location within Tavush
- Coordinates: 41°12′10″N 45°00′12″E
- Country: Armenia
- Province: Tavush
- Municipality: Noyemberyan

Government

Population (2011)
  - Total: 2,987
- Time zone: UTC+4 (AMT)

Berdavan (Armenian: Բերդավան) is a village on the Kolb River in the Noyemberyan Municipality of the Tavush Province of Armenia. The village is located about 2 km north of the town of Noyemberyan, and near the villages of Dovekh, Koghb and Zorakan. Berdavan Fortress is located on a nearby hilltop.

== Toponymy ==
Historically, the village was called Tkhadzor, then Ghalacha, and in 1978 it was renamed Berdavan.

== History ==
The village of Ghalacha was relocated in 1893 – 1900. The relocation was due to the presence of mosquitos which were thought to bring malaria, but at the new site there were problems with access to drinking water. The school in Ghalacha was opened in 1906, after a period when there were no official schools in the area.

During the Second World War, Berdavan lost more than half of its male population, and during the First Nagorno-Karabakh War the village was heavily shelled. The village has a monument dedicated to the people who died in World War II.

== Gallery ==
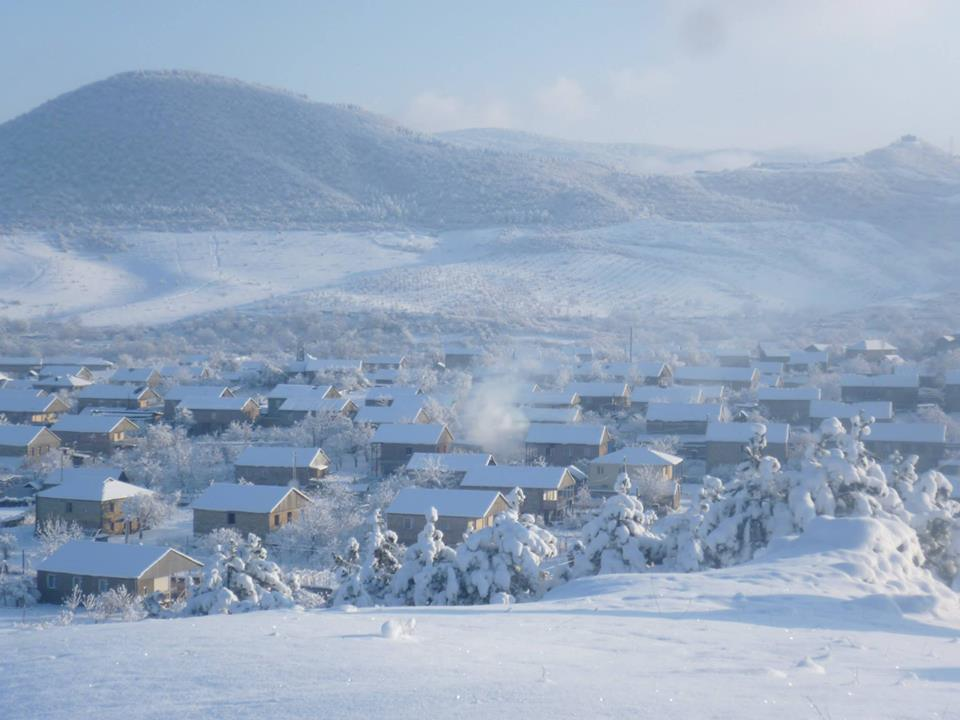
Berdavan in winter

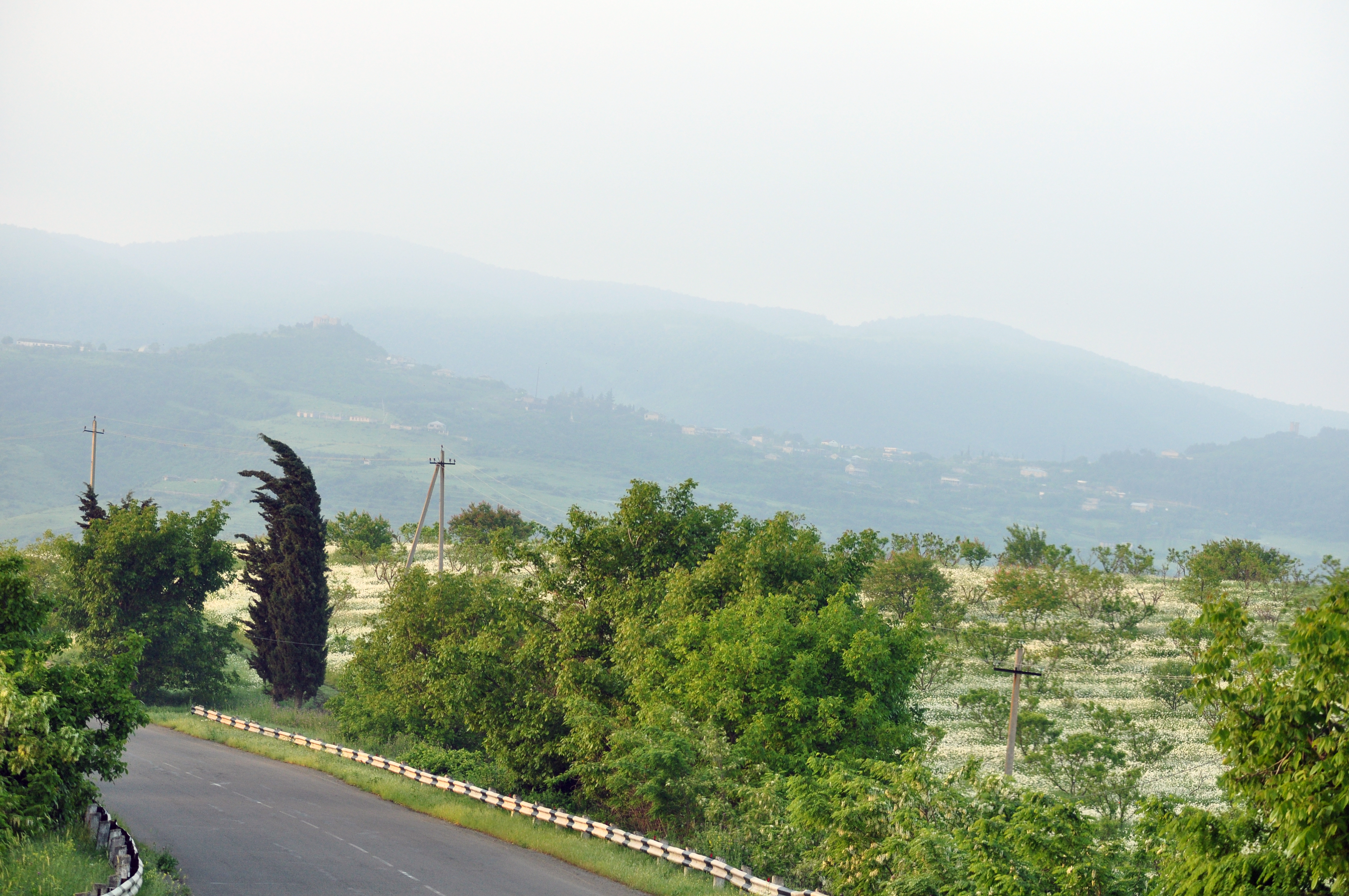
Scenery around the village

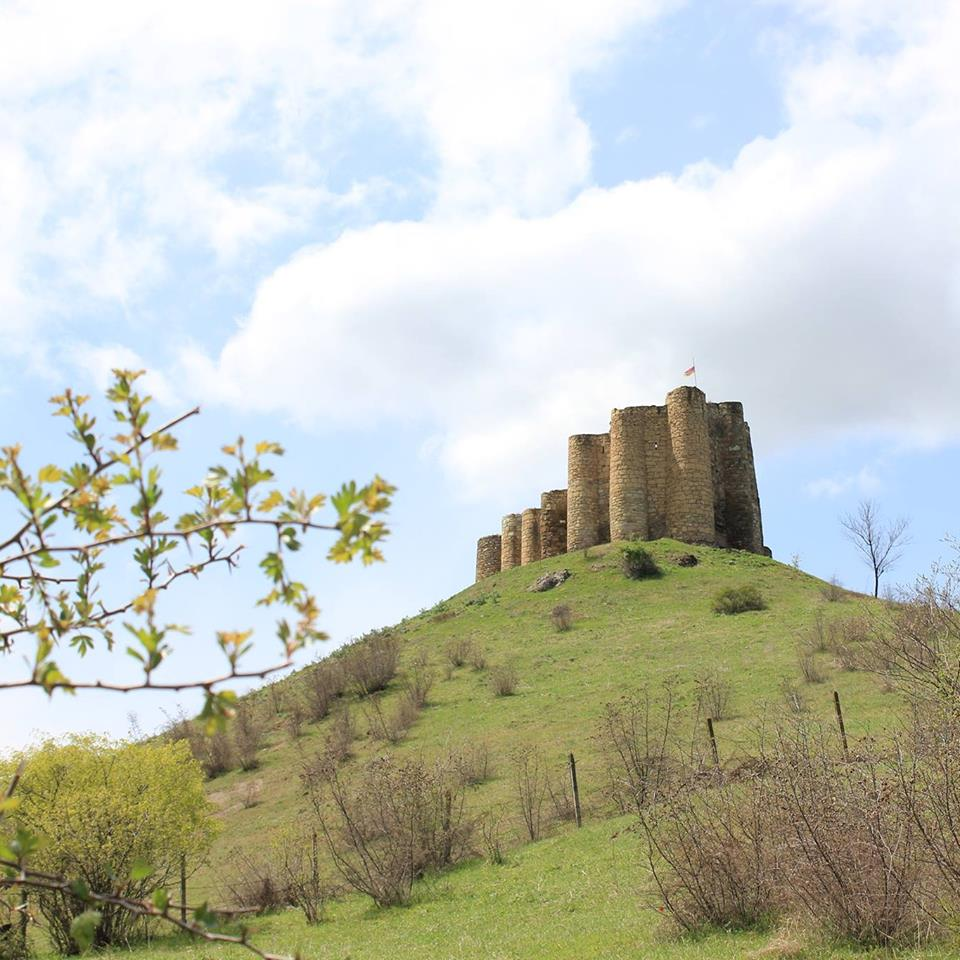
Berdavan Fortress

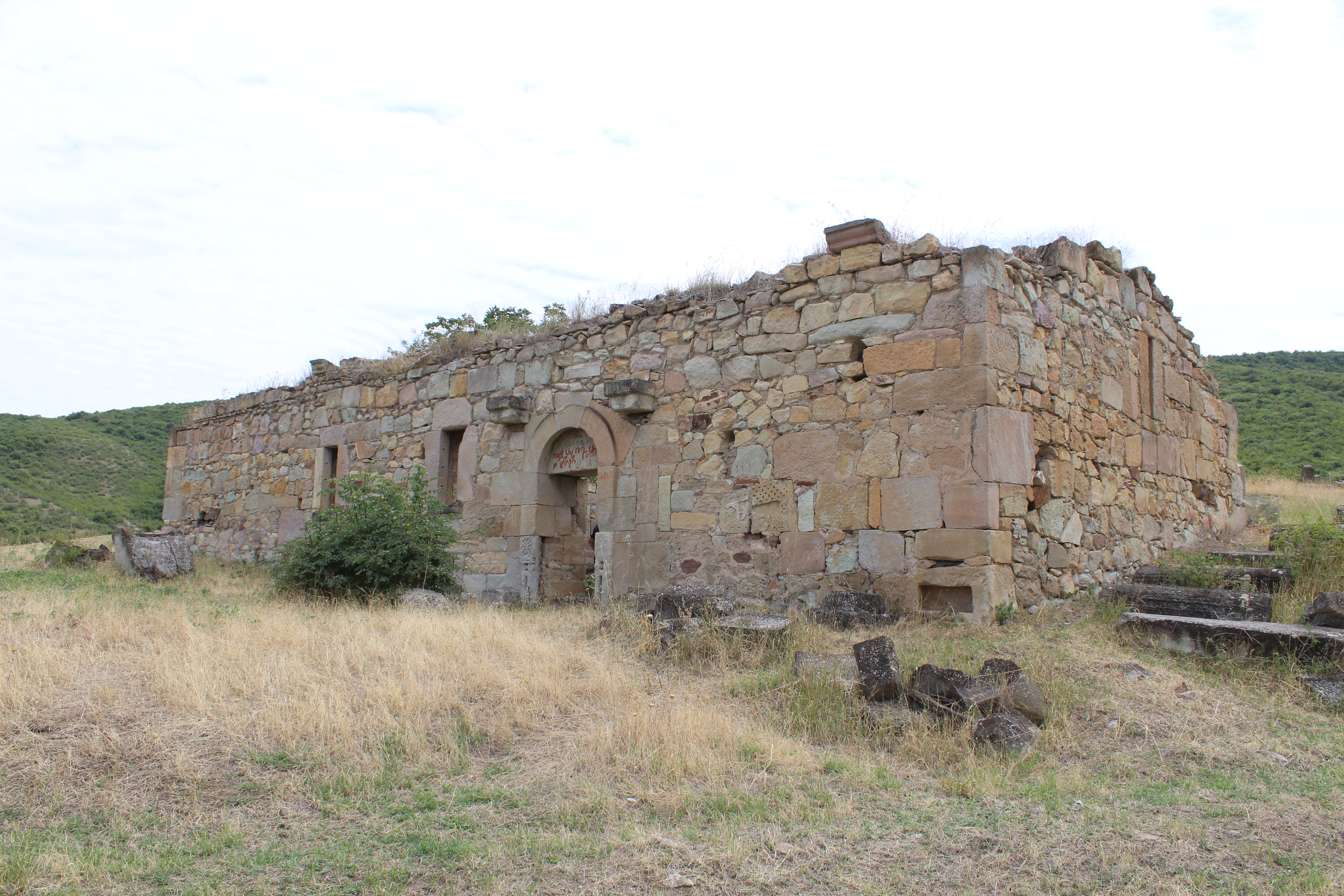
St. Nshan Church near Berdavan
