= Holy Mother of God Church, Voskepar =

Church in Voskepar, Armenia

Holy Mother of God Church of Voskepar
- Ոսկեպարի Սուրբ Աստվածածին եկեղեցի
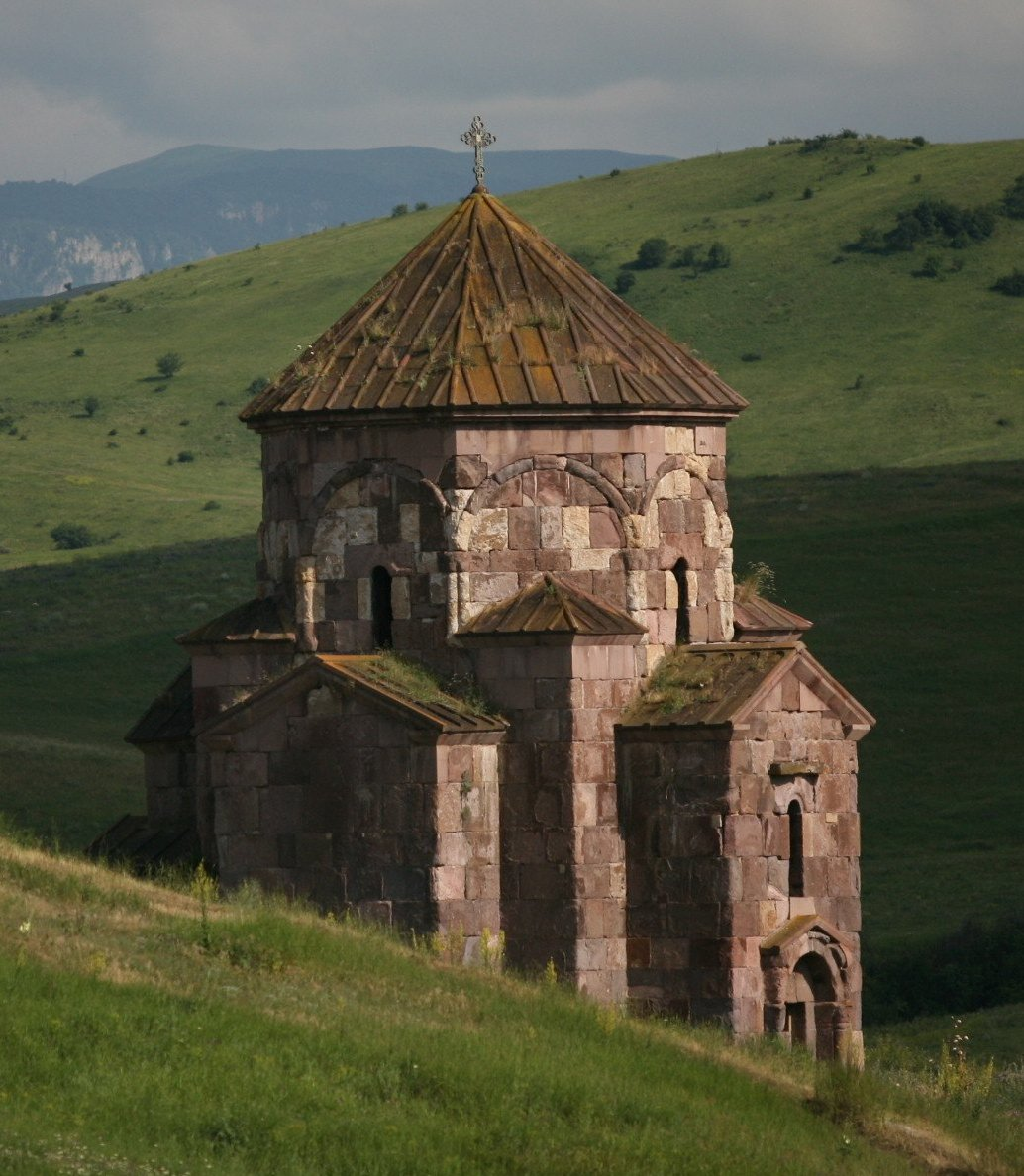

- Location within Armenia Location within Tavush

Religion
- Affiliation: Armenian Apostolic Church

Location
- Location: Voskepar, Tavush Province, Armenia
- Coordinates: 41.073639°N 45.075554°E

Architecture
- Type: Small cruciform central-plan
- Style: Armenian
- Completed: 7th century
- Dome: 1

The Holy Mother of God Church of Voskepar (Armenian: Ոսկեպարի Սուրբ Աստվածածին եկեղեցի) is a 7th-century Armenian church in Voskepar, Armenia, adjacent to the border with Azerbaijan. Its design is that of a cruciform central plan, the "Mastara" type. The roof was originally made of tiles. The church was reconstructed in 1975–1977. Despite heavy fighting during the First Nagorno-Karabakh War having spread to the area (Tavush Province of Armenia/Gazakh Rayon of Azerbaijan), and the destruction of the immediately adjacent Azeri village, Aşağı Əskipara (Lower Askipara), the church still stands.

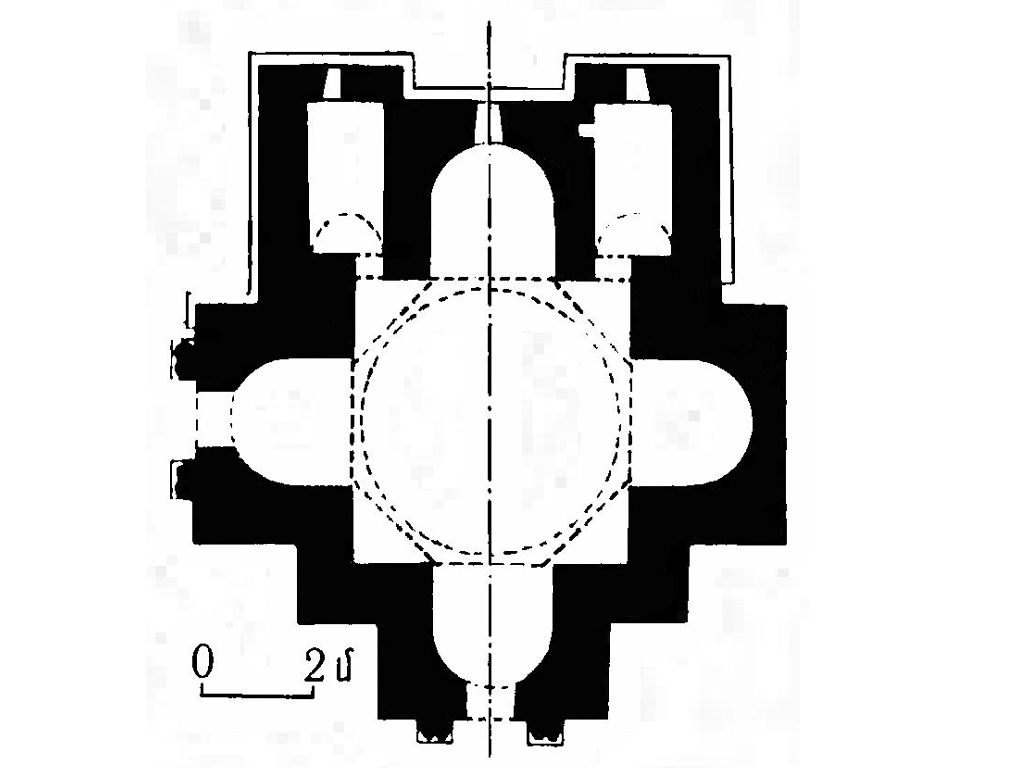
Plan of Holy Mother of God Church of Voskepar
