= Berdavan Fortress =

Armenian fortress

Berdavan Fortress Բերդավանի ամրոց
- Tavush Province, Armenia
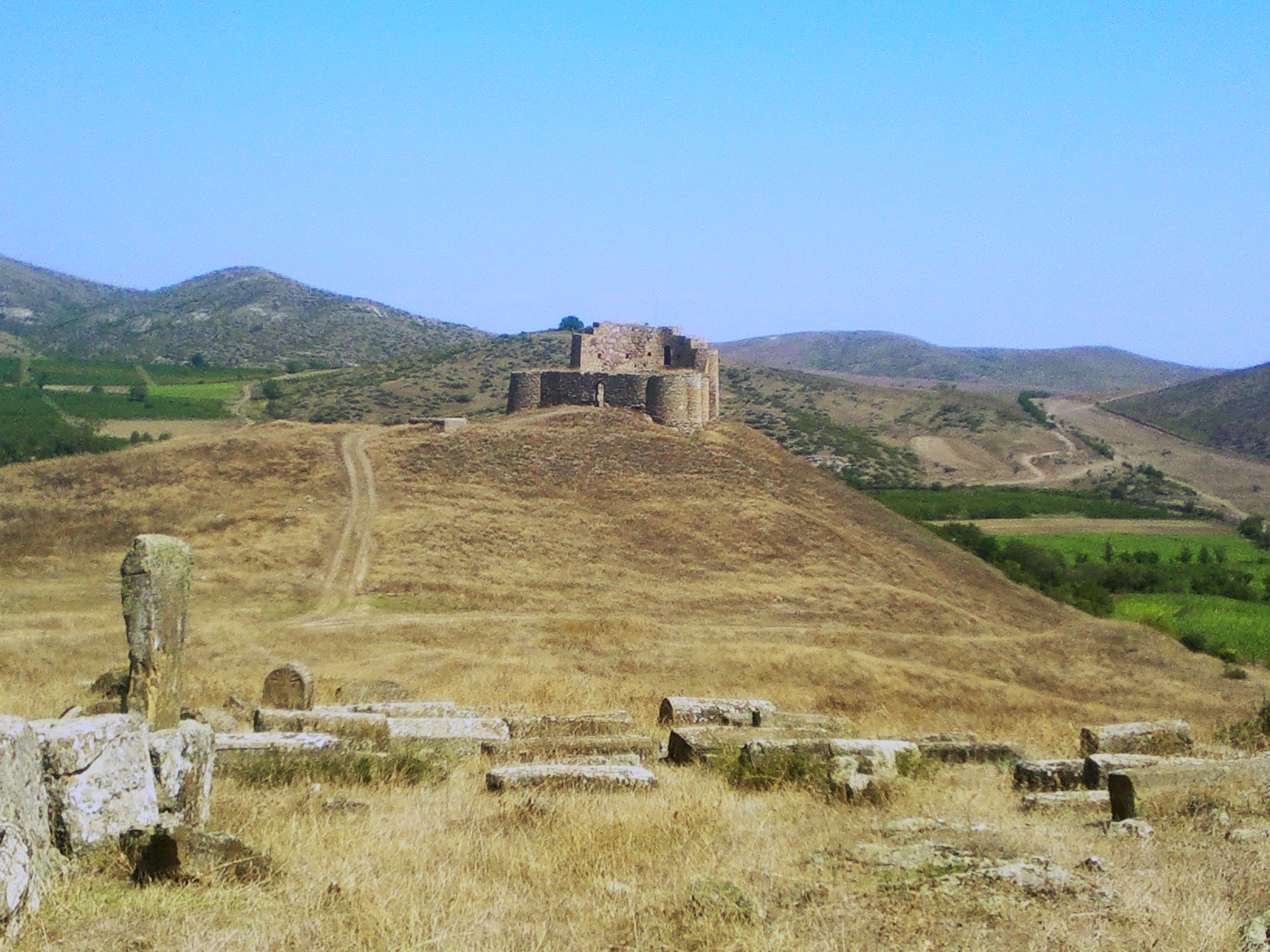

Site information
- Type: Fortress
- Open to the public: Yes
- Condition: Large portions survive intact.

Location
- Shown within Armenia Berdavan Fortress; Բերդավանի ամրոց (Tavush)
- Coordinates: 41.2038°N 45.0206°E

Site history
- Built: Most likely 10th century; 13th-17th century 17th-century reconstruction.
- Materials: Stone
- Demolished: Partially

Berdavan Fortress (Armenian: Բերդավանի ամրոց; Բերդավան; also Ghalinjakar Fortress) is a fortress in Armenia, located on a hilltop near the village of Berdavan in the Tavush Province, near the border with Azerbaijan. It is 664 metres (2,178 ft) above sea level.

== History ==
Berdavan is thought to have originally been built between the 10th and 11th centuries, but the present structure is most likely of the late-medieval period from around the 17th century during which time the castle was reconstructed. It is likely that the temple of Ghalinjakar mentioned in the 13th-century works of an unnamed Georgian historian is in fact Berdavan.

Some additional reconstruction took place in the 1980s. Ruins were cleared out, and the poorly constructed upper portions of the serf walls and towers were broken down and reconstructed. The two northeastern towers are currently being reconstructed. Archaeological excavations at the site have uncovered ceramic plates, metal axes and other items giving insight to the lives of those who lived and worked at Berdavan.

== Architecture ==
=== Fortress ===
The walls of the fortress are laid out in a triangular plan with ramparts linked together by eleven semi-cylindrical exterior towers that taper very little to the top and end at the same height as the walls. Because of the sloping topography at the site, the towers vary in height from 5.5 metres (18 ft) at the southwest end and 10.5 metres (34 ft) on the northwest end. Fortification walls are 1.2 metres (3.9 ft) thick. There is only one portal (1 meter in width) leading into the interior of the fortress, and it is at the western wall. Stairs are south of the entry.

Within the confines of the fortress walls were once shelters, storehouses and other buildings. A secret passage had once led from the fortress to the canyon below in the event of a siege. Part of the passageway (the height of a human) may still be seen at the lower portion of the eastern corner tower. The tower has an open interior, with a high door leading to the passage.

=== Church ===
Ruins of a triple-nave church with an adjacent medieval cemetery and chapel are 200 metres (660 ft) southwest of the fortress. It is assumed that the structure was built around the late-medieval period, around the time of the foundation of the fortress in the 10th century because of the layout, decorative elements and the building technique. The walls of the church still stand at their original height but the roof has since collapsed and parts of the structure lie buried. Walls are constructed of a slightly hewn yellowish felsite stone with some fragments of khachkars imbedded into the exterior.

There is only one portal leading into the structure from the northern wall, likely constructed from stones taken from another monument. Above the entry is a tympanum style lintel. Two iron rings positioned at either side of the portal indicate that there was once a wooden hall in front. The rectangular prayer hall, 12.55 by 7.75 metres (41.2 by 25.4 ft), was once divided into three naves by a pair of arches. Inset wall-pillars once stood at the walls to the north and the south. Remainders of arches and their footings are located above where the pillars stood, while the arches that had once spanned the naves are now gone. At the eastern side of the church is a semi-circular apse with a high stage and two "studies" or prayer rooms adjacent at either side.

Walls of a separate chapel 50 metres (160 ft) south of the church have a pair of khachkars of the 12th or 13th century perched on a high pedestal.

At the cemetery there is an unusual and large tevavor khachkar, meaning "cross stone with arms," in the yard. The stone has been carved in the shape of a cross and sits in a cube-shaped stone pedestal. The face of the khachkar has bas-relief carvings of crosses and standing human figures that sit in separate "panels".
