= Voskepar =

Village in Tavush, Armenia

Voskepar Ոսկեպար
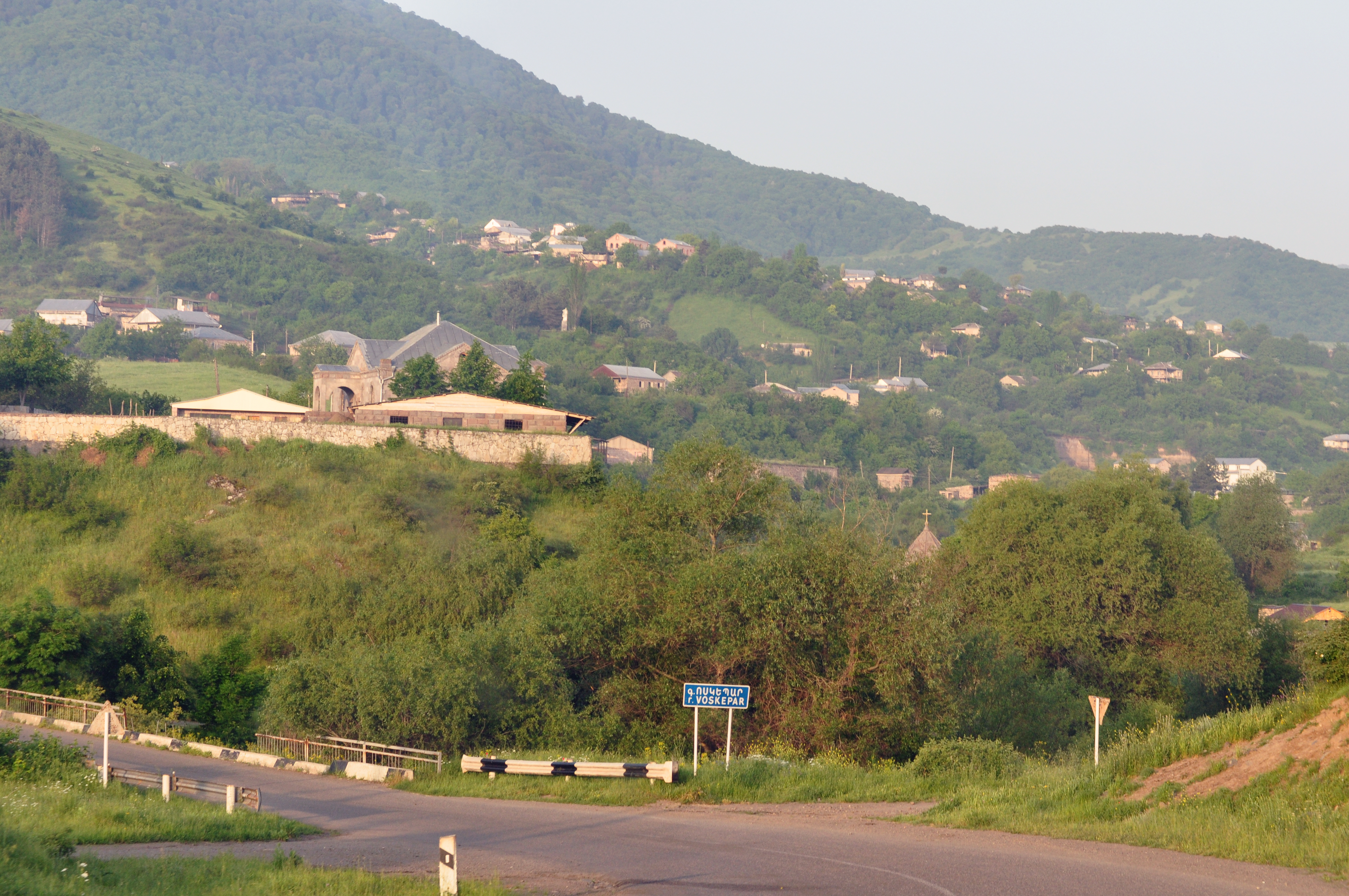
- Voskepar in May 2011
- Interactive map of Voskepar
- Location within Armenia Location within Tavush
- Coordinates: 41°03′53″N 45°03′27″E
- Country: Armenia
- Province: Tavush
- Municipality: Noyemberyan

Area
  - Total: 11.5683 km^{2} (4.4665 sq mi)
- Elevation: 850 m (2,790 ft)

Population (2011)
  - Total: 818
- Time zone: UTC+4 (AMT)
- Postal code: 4114

Voskepar (Armenian: Ոսկեպար) is a village in the Noyemberyan Municipality of the Tavush Province of Armenia, located close to the Armenia–Azerbaijan border.

== Etymology ==
Voskepar derives its name from the Voskepar mountain range; from Armenian ոսկե (voske, gold), and պարան (paran: string or chain). In the 19th and 20th centuries the village was also known as Aksibara and Akhsibara.

== History ==
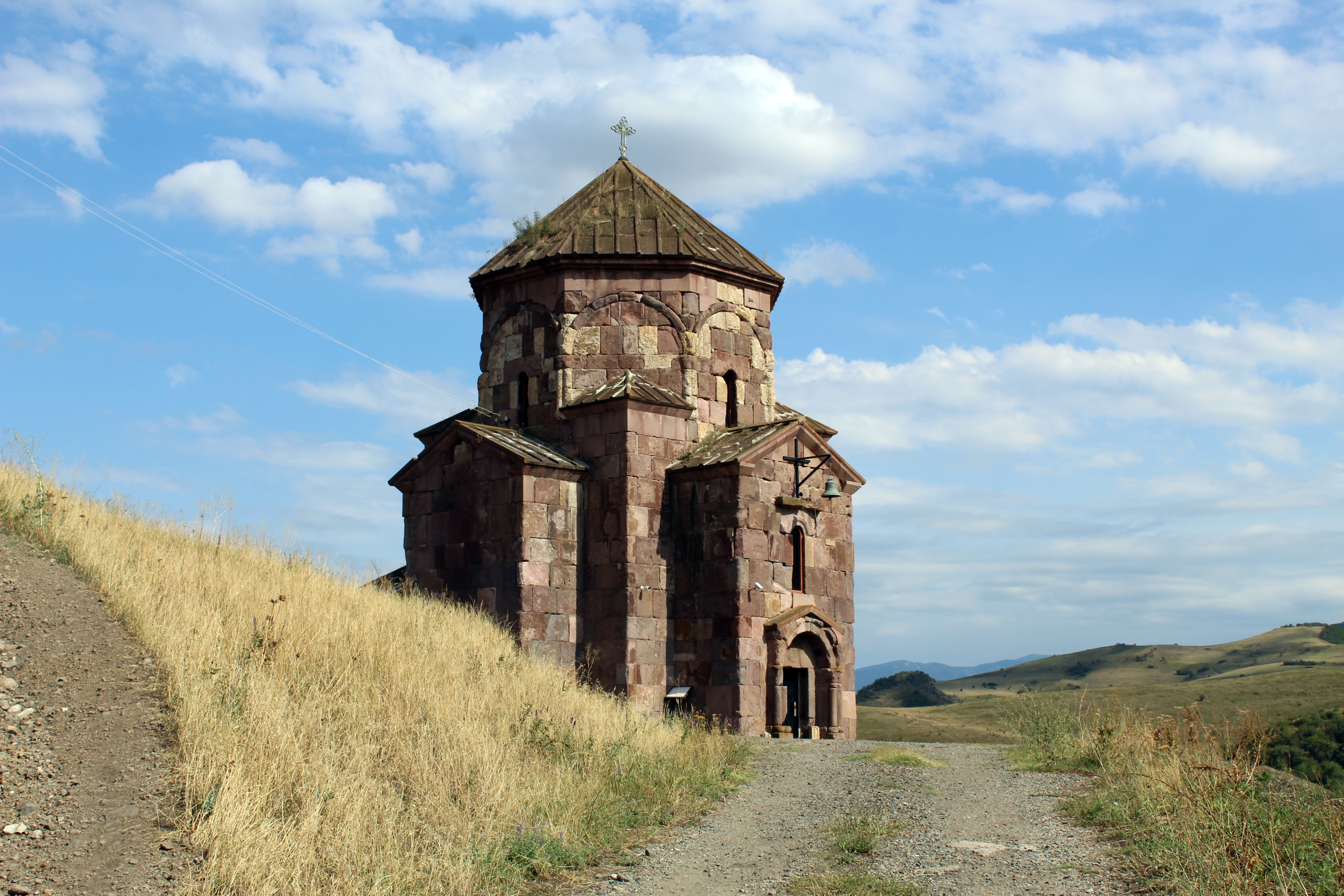
Holy Mother of God Church of Voskepar

Voskepar was founded in the 6th century. The village contains the 7th-century Armenian Holy Mother of God Church.

=== First Nagorno-Karabakh War ===
During the First Nagorno-Karabakh War, seven people were killed in inter-ethnic fighting in and around the village.

In 1991, the second operation of Operation Ring took place in and around Voskepar. This was a military operation conducted by Soviet Internal Security Forces and OMON units, officially dubbed a "passport checking operation." The stated goal launched by the Soviet Union's internal and defense ministries was to disarm Armenian militia detachments, which were organized in "[illegally] armed formations." The operation involved the use of soldiers who accompanied a complement of military vehicles, artillery and helicopter gunships to be used to root out the self-described Armenian fedayeen. However, contrary to their stated objectives, Soviet troops and the predominantly Azerbaijani soldiers in the Azerbaijan SSR OMON and army forcibly displaced many Armenians. Some authors have also described the actions of the joint Soviet and Azerbaijani force as ethnic cleansing. According to Svante E. Cornell, Operation Ring was carried out with "harshly systematic human rights violations."

Five Azerbaijani soldiers were killed in the border area close to the village in May 2012.

== Geography ==
The town lies in a valley to the south of the Voskepar Ridge, which reaches heights of 1,538 metres (5,046 ft). The average temperature is 30 °C (86 °F) in summer and −2 °C (28 °F) in winter. The abandoned villages of Yukhari Askipara (Upper Askipara, Verin Voskepar in Armenian) and Ashagi Askipara (Lower Askipara, Nerkin Voskepar in Armenian) are located near the village. The village is located 163 kilometres (101 mi) north of Yerevan.

== Demographics ==
The population of the village was 956 in 2001, 880 in 2008, and 818 in 2011.

== Economy and culture ==
The population is mainly engaged in agriculture and animal husbandry. The village contains a health clinic, a house of culture, and a community center. There were 103 school pupils in the village in 2011. Besides the Holy Mother of God Church, the village also contains the St. Astvatsatsin Church and the St. Sarkin Church, built in 2000.

== Gallery ==
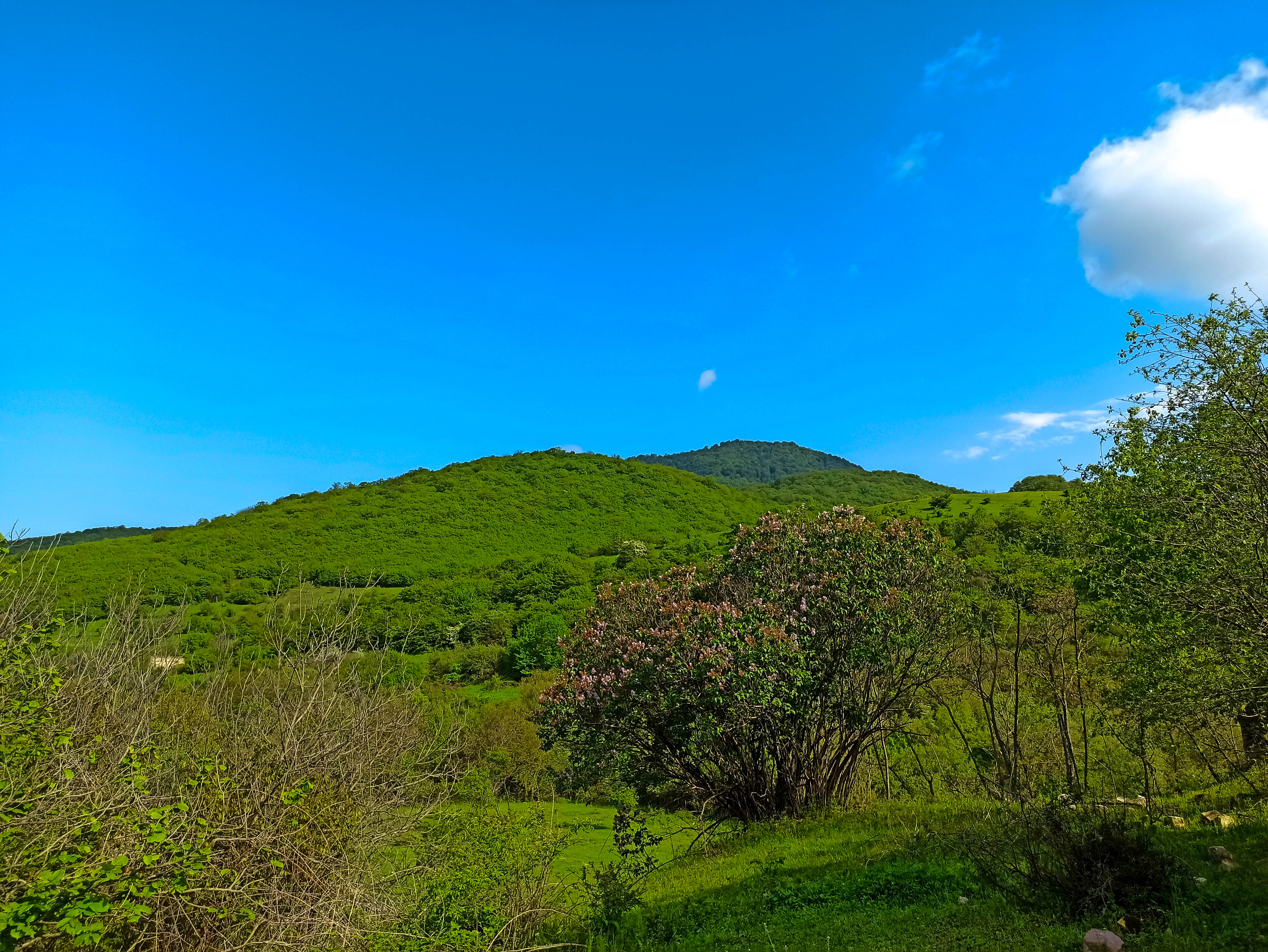

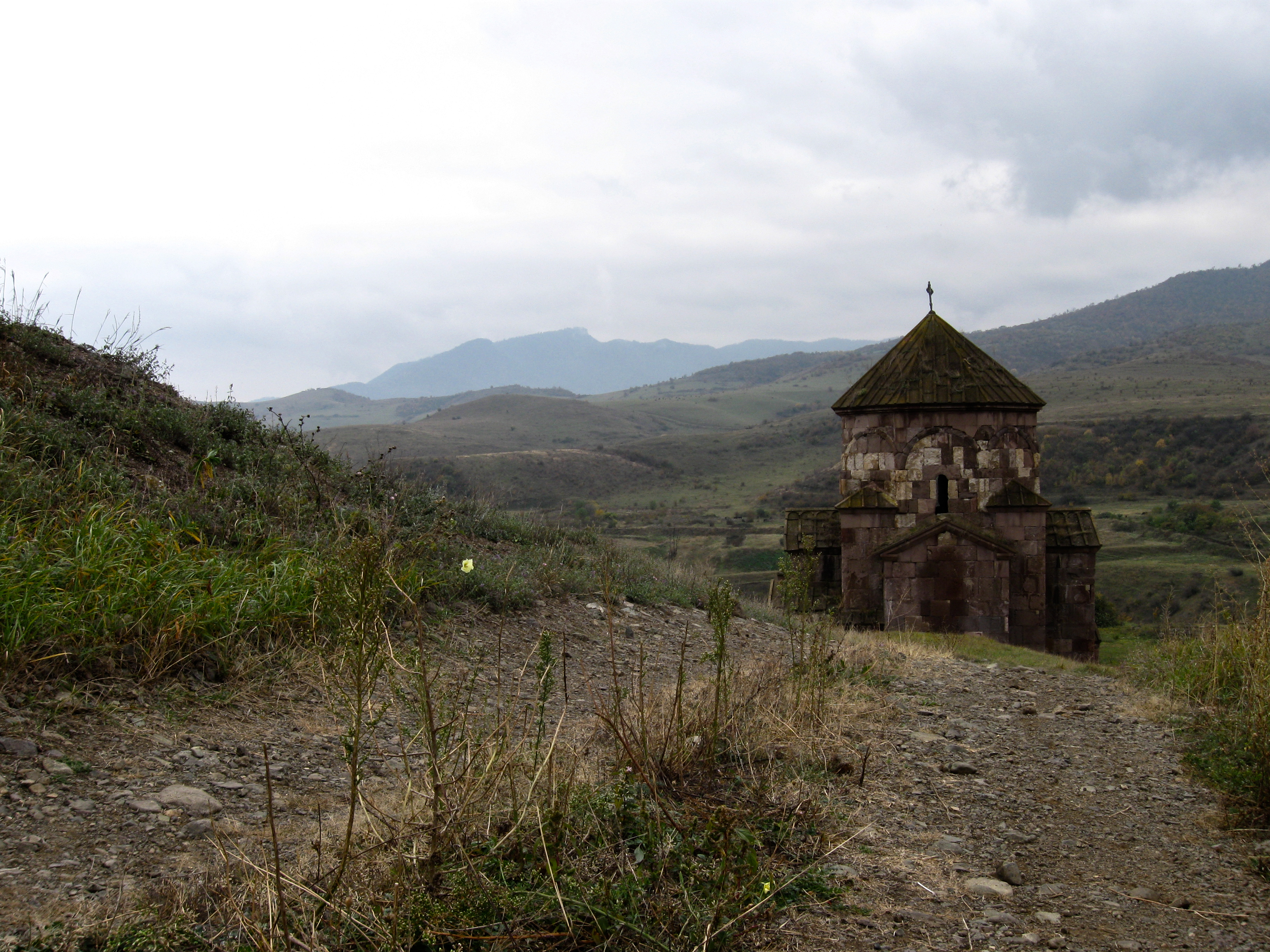
Holy Mother of God Church

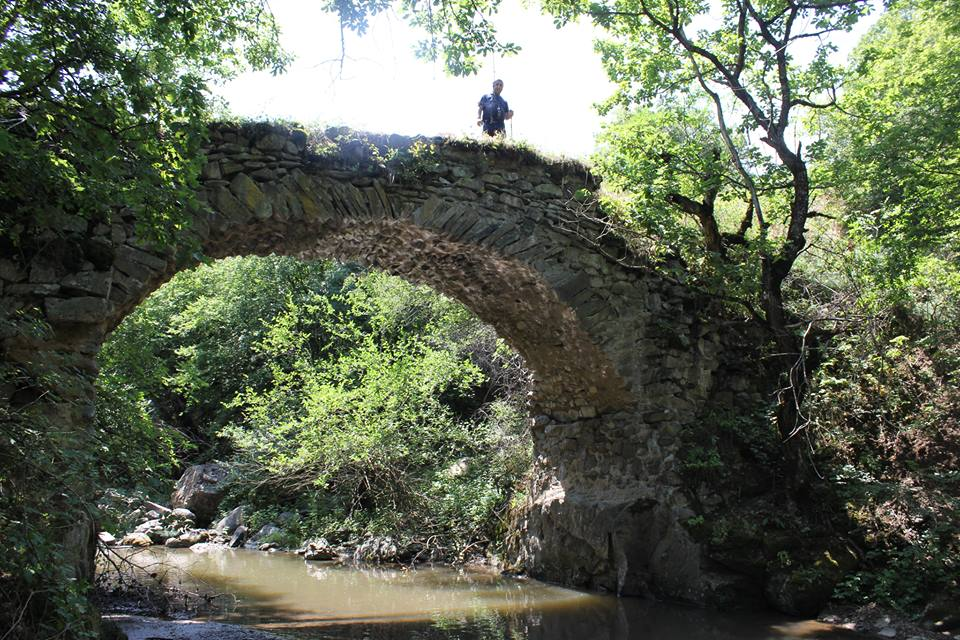

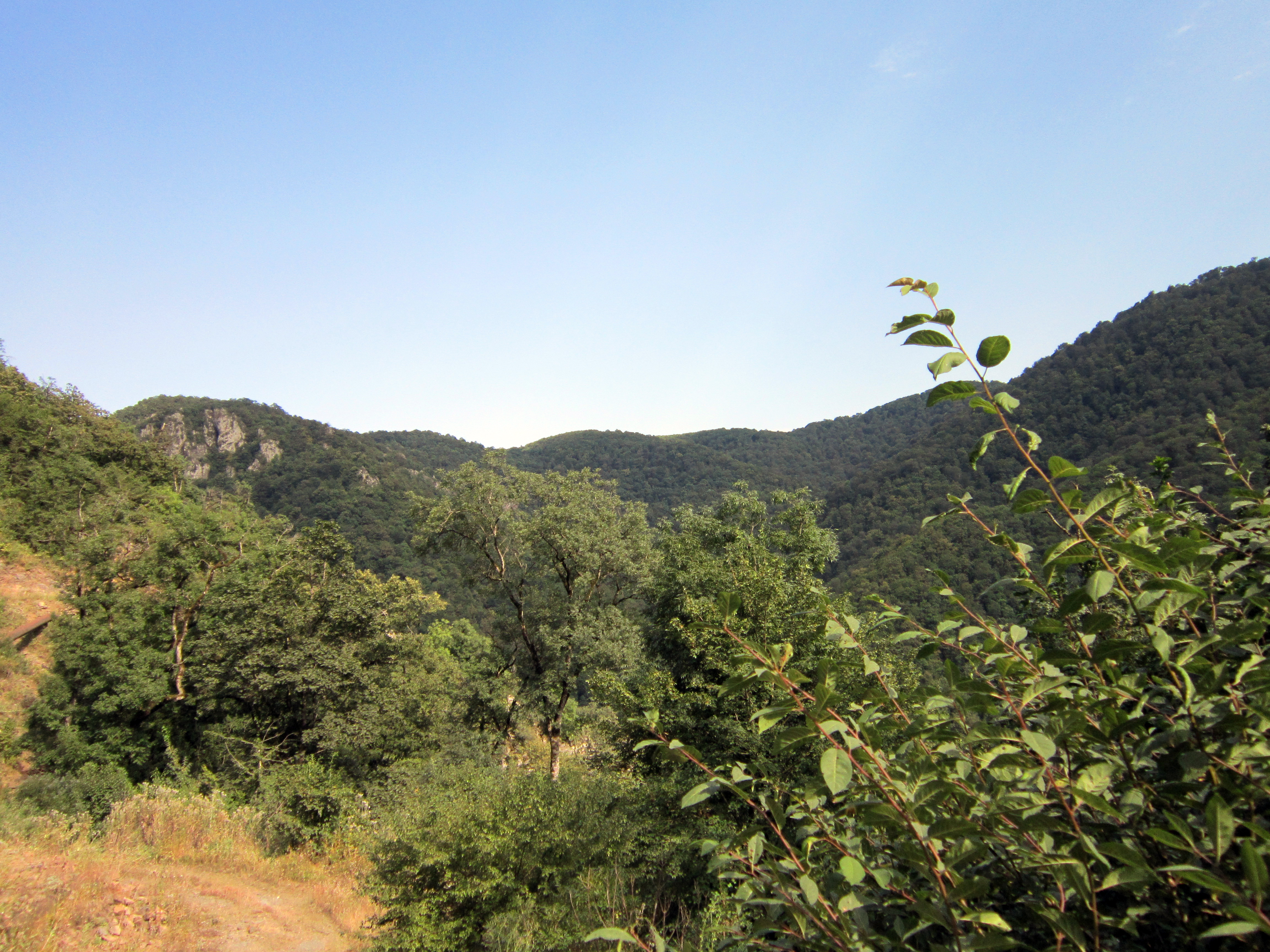

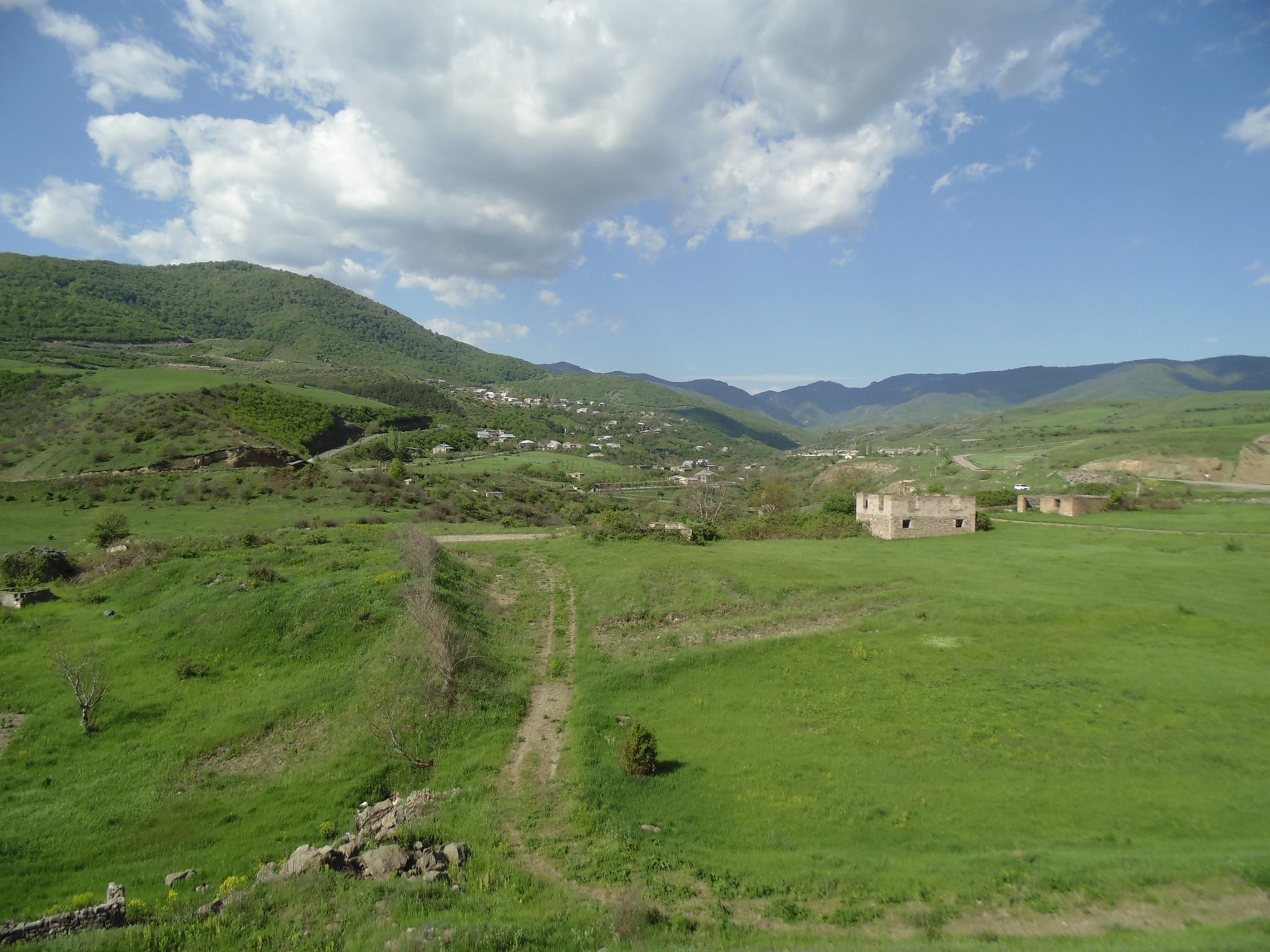

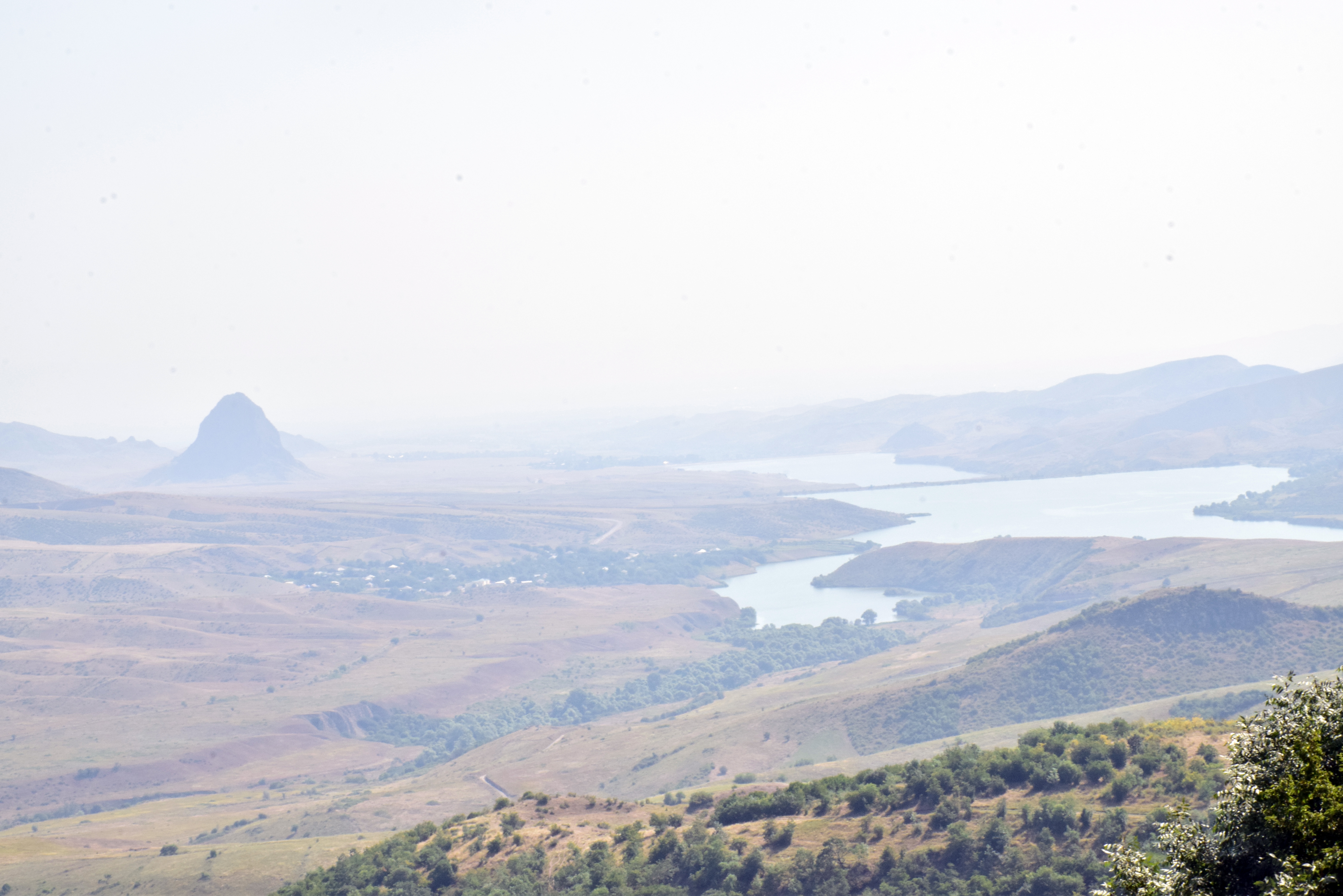

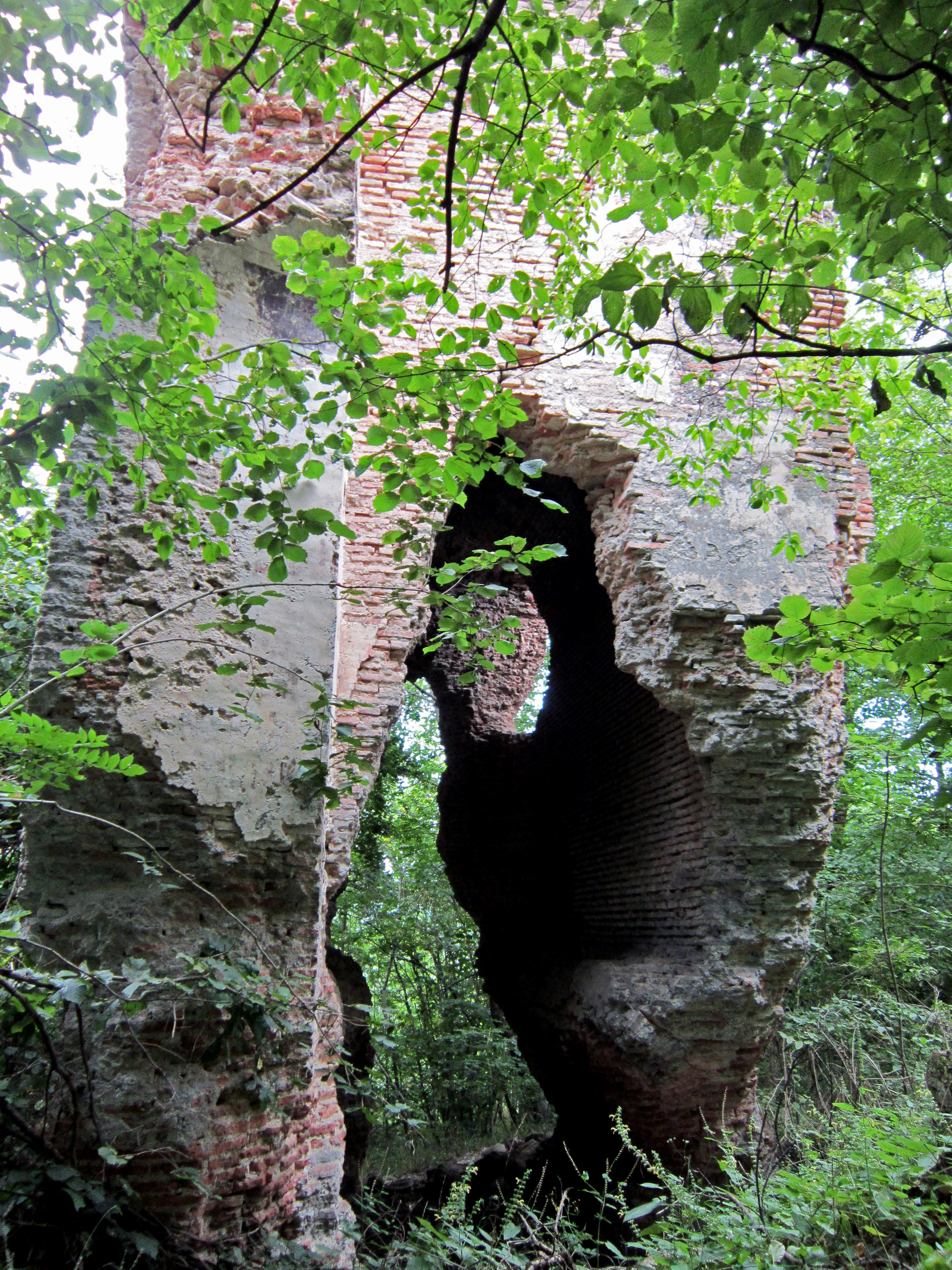
Berdavank fortress

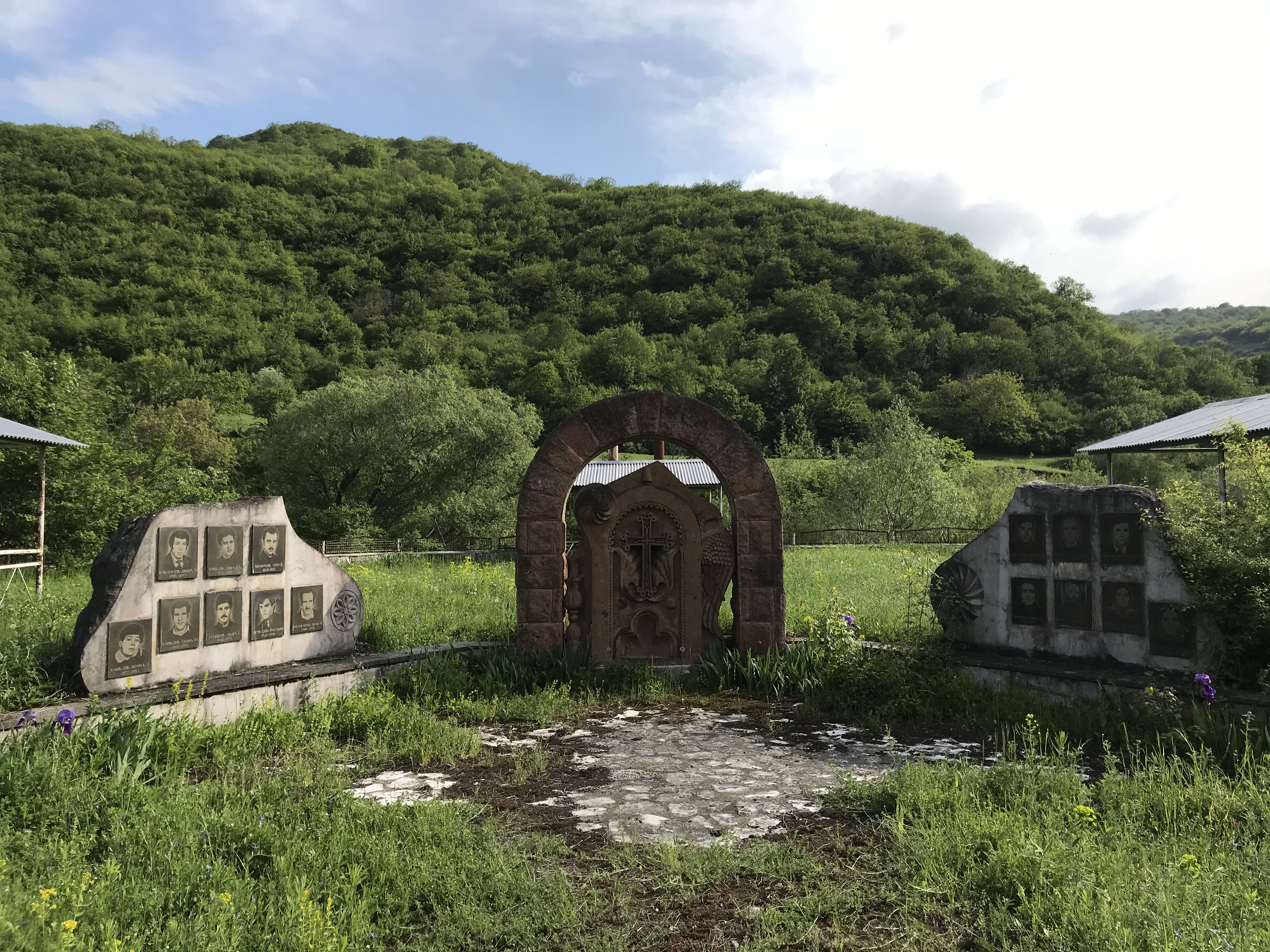
Artsakh war memorial

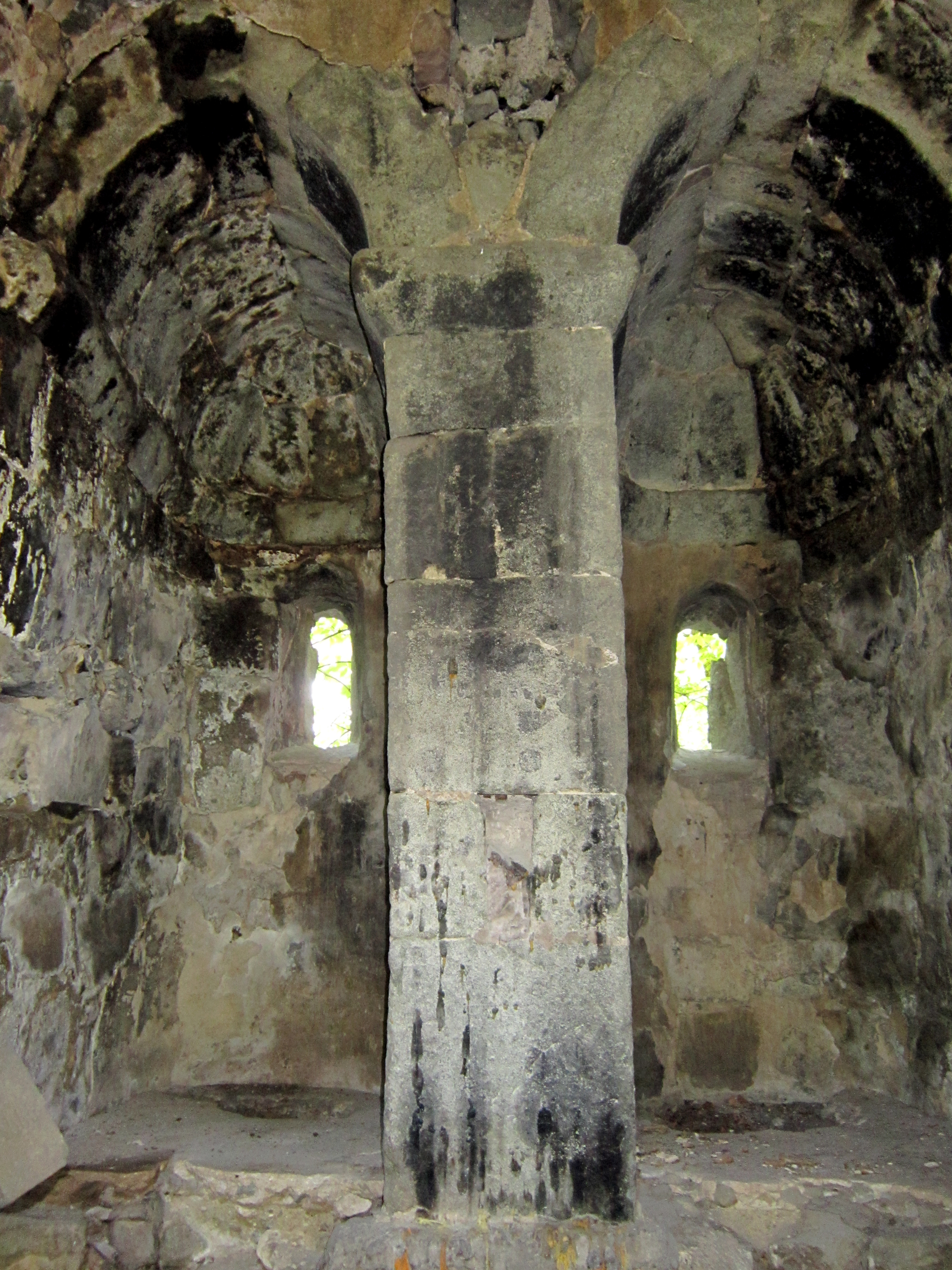
Jukhtak Yeghtsi Monastery
