= Haghpat =

Haghpat Հաղպատ
- Location within Armenia
- Coordinates: 41°05′42″N 44°42′37″E
- Country: Armenia
- Province: Lori
- Elevation: 1,000 m (3,300 ft)

Population (2011)
  - Total: 668
- Time zone: UTC+4 (AMT)

Haghpat (Armenian: Հաղպատ) is a village in the Lori Province of Armenia, located near the city of Alaverdi and the state border with Georgia.

The village is notable for Haghpat Monastery, a medieval monastery complex founded in the 10th century, and included in the UNESCO World Heritage List since 1996 along with nearby Sanahin Monastery.

== Geography ==
The village lies on a dissected plateau, a large flat area dissected by deep "cracks" formed by rivers, including the river Debed. The villages of Sanahin and Akner, as well as a part of Alaverdi, lie in plain view on neighbouring sections of the plateau. However, a steep and long descent to and ascent from the river is required to travel to them.

== Gallery ==
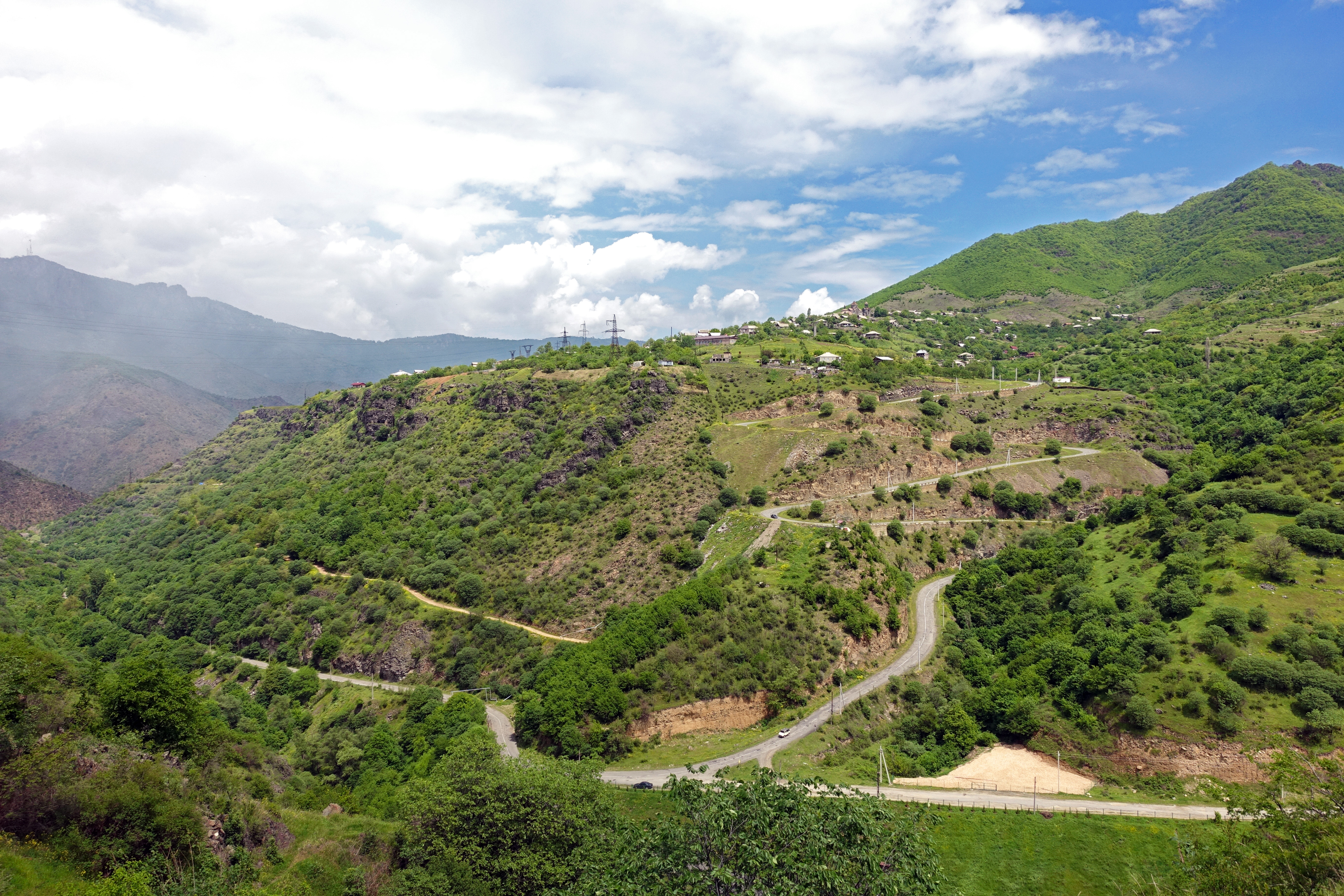

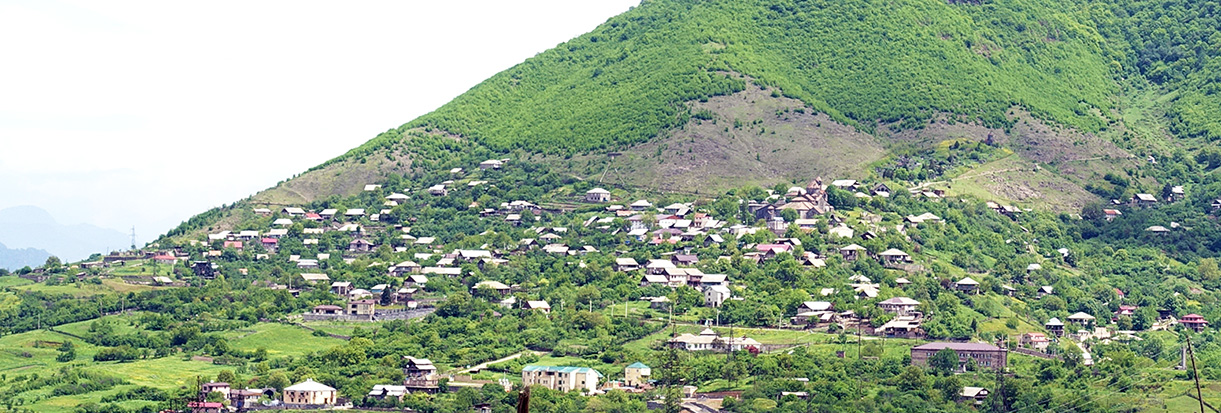

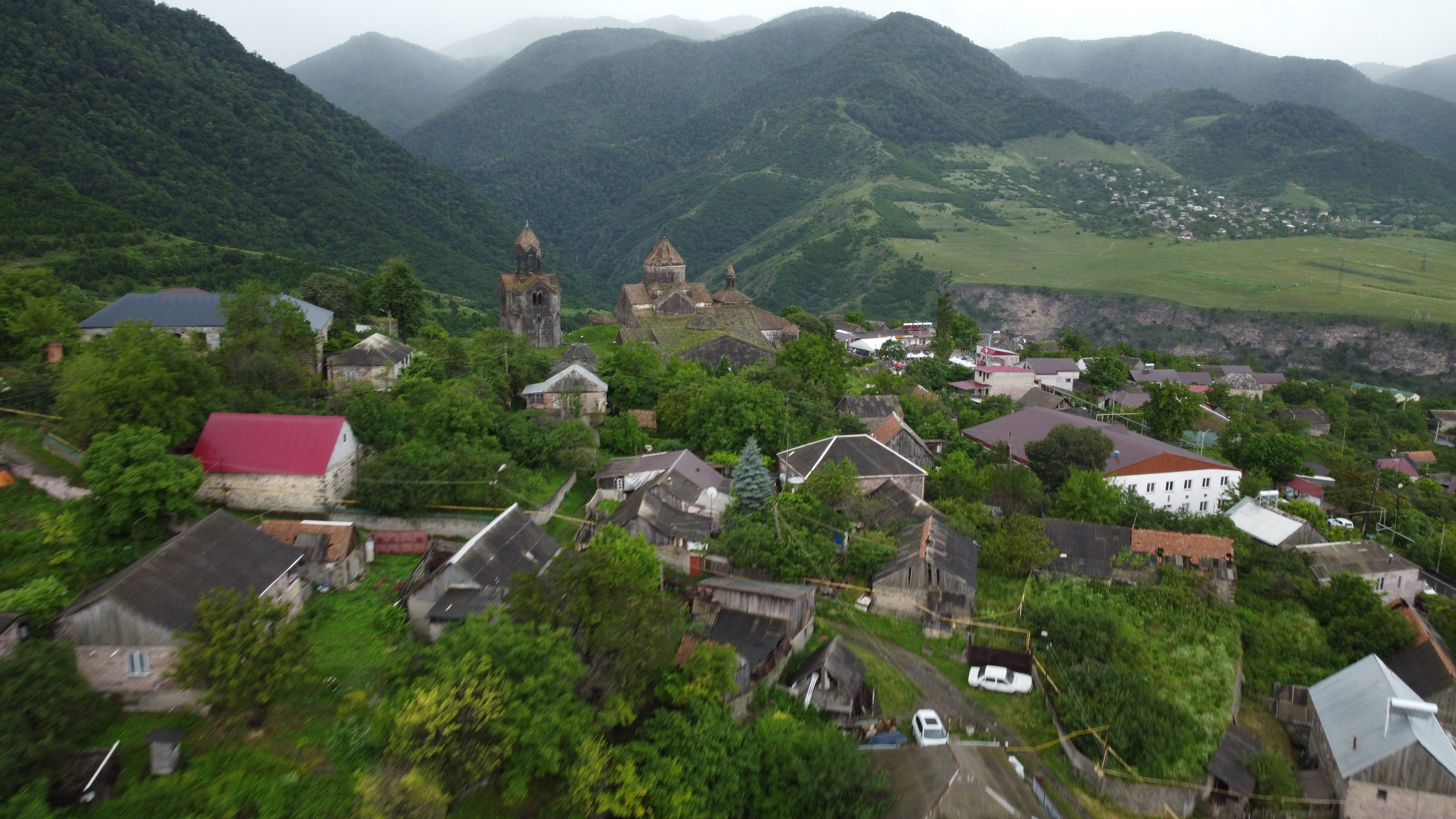

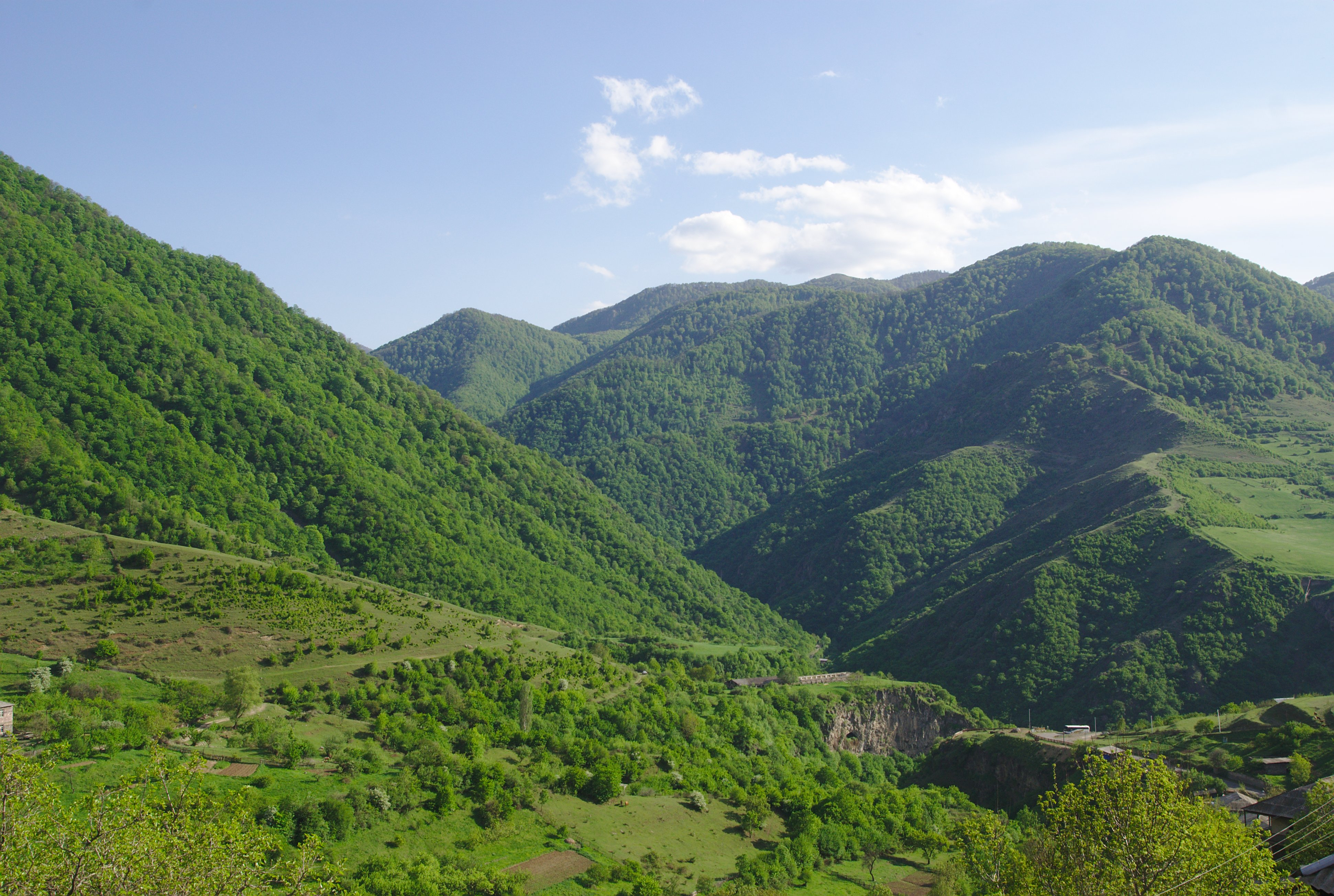

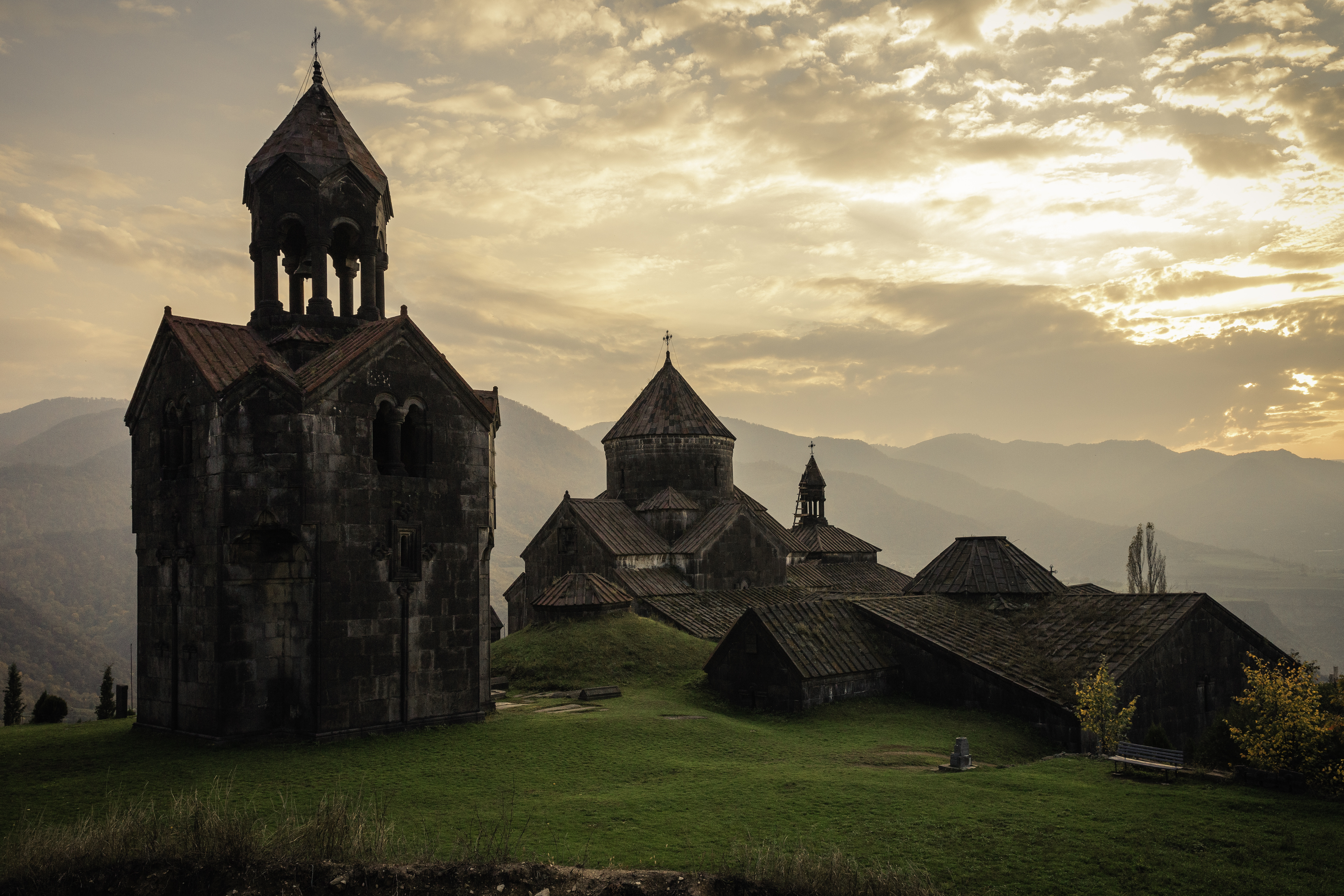

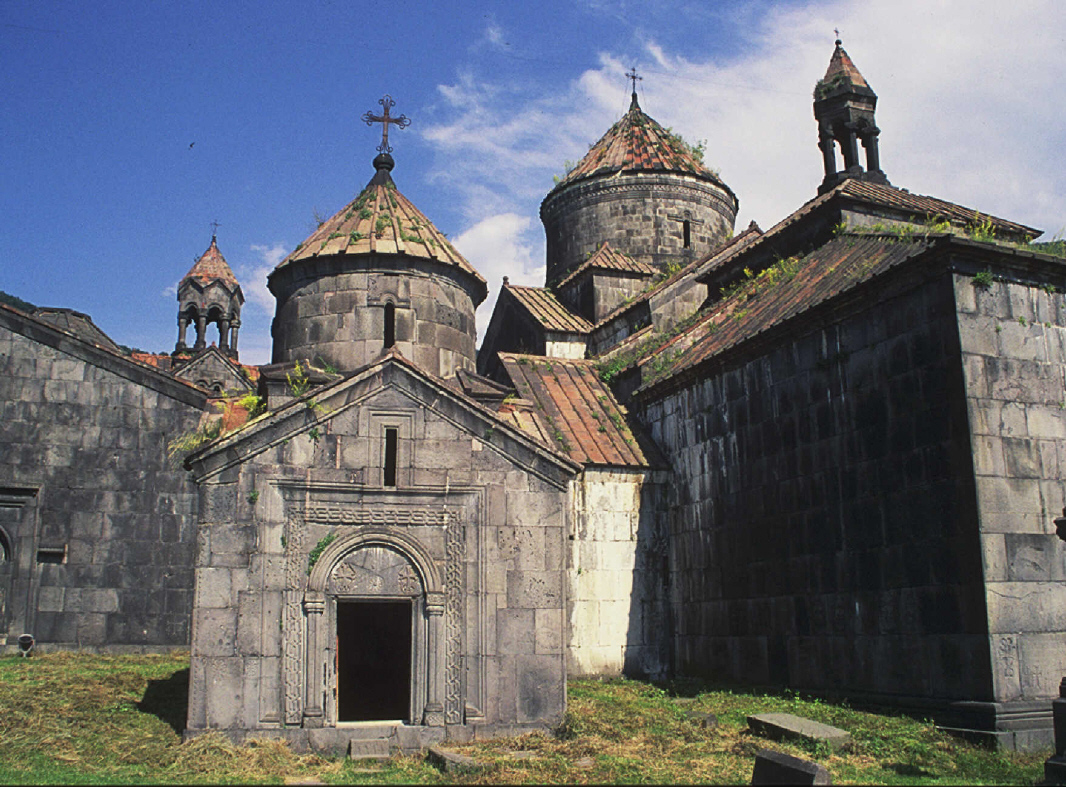

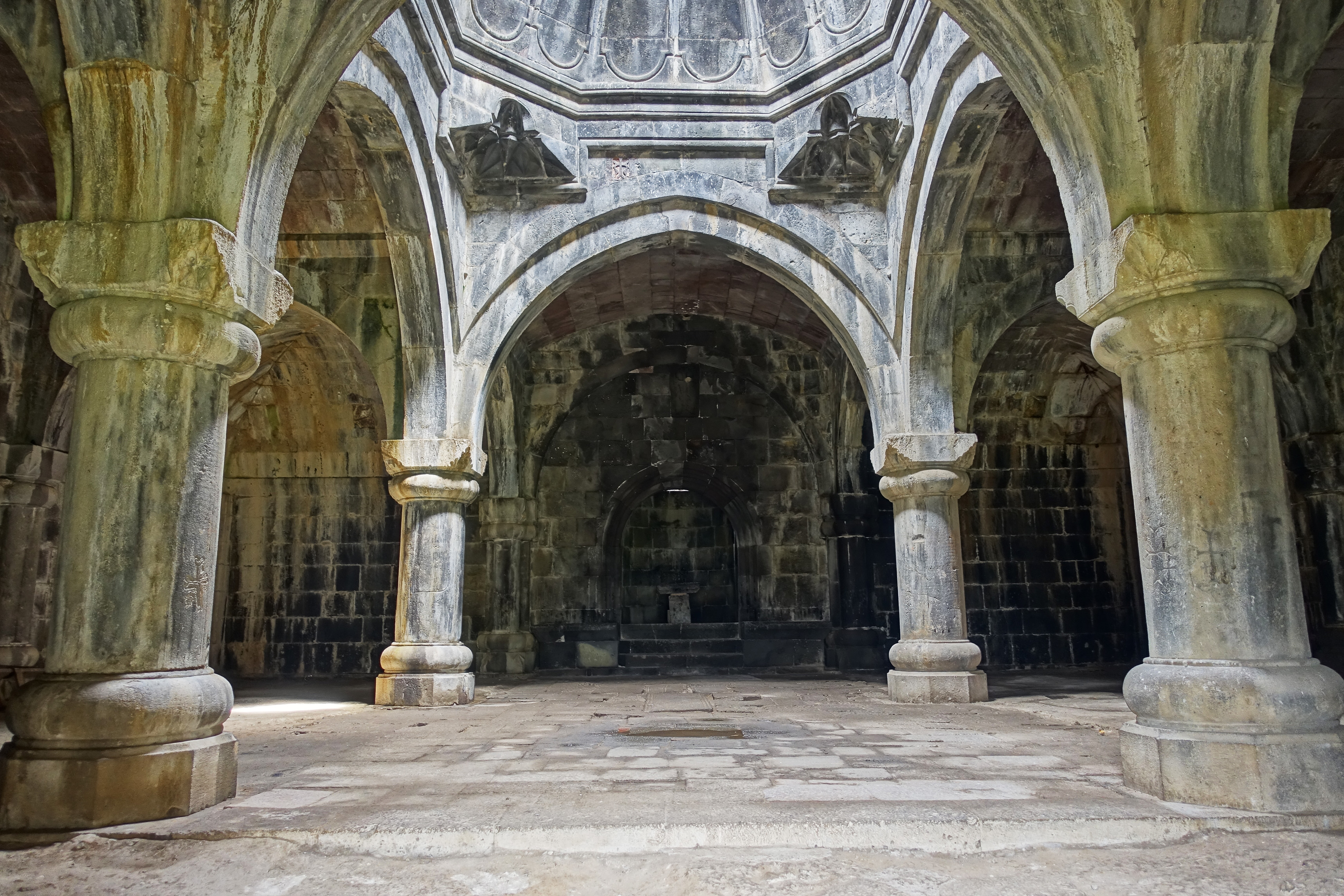
