= Akner =

Akner may refer to:

- Akner, Lori, Armenia
- Akner, Syunik, Armenia
- Akner monastery, Turkey

== See also ==
- Ackner
