= Otto Wilhelm Hermann Abich =

German mineralogist and geologist (1806–1886)

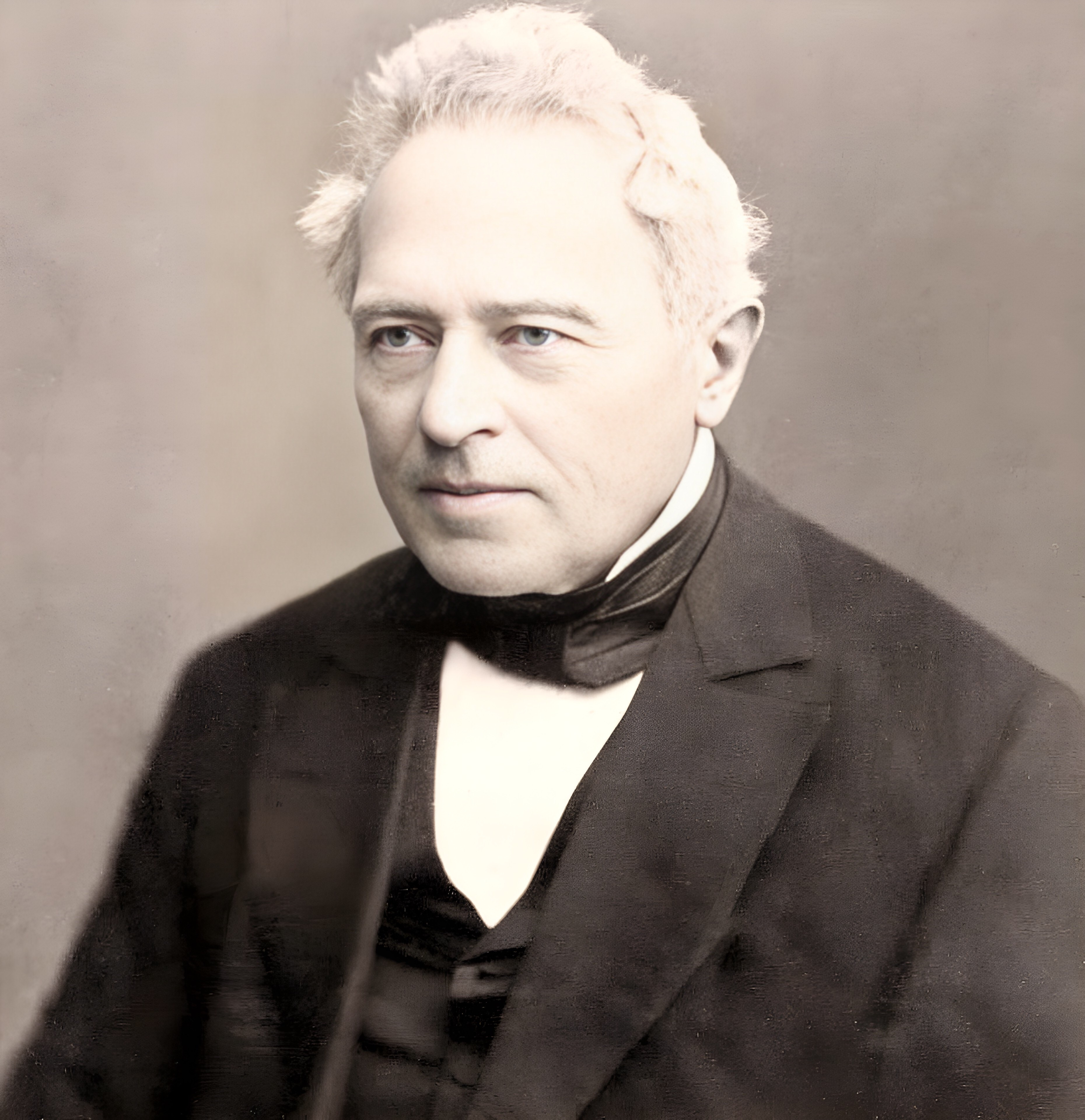
- Born: 11 December 1806; Berlin
- Died: 1 July 1886 (aged 79); Vienna
- Education: Humboldt University of Berlin
- Scientific career
- Fields: Mineralogy, geology
- Workplaces: Imperial University of Dorpat

Otto Wilhelm Hermann Abich (11 December 1806 – 1 July 1886) was a German mineralogist and geologist who was among the first to conduct scientific studies in the Caucasus region and has been called the Father of Caucasian Geology. He worked briefly at the Imperial University of Dorpat and then travelled as part of the Corps of Mining Engineers of the Russian Empire. He collected minerals and fossils across the regions in which he travelled including Armenia, Persia, Italy and Daghestan.

== Biography ==
Abich was the son of mining officer Heinrich Carl Wilhelm and his wife Johanna Wilhemine, daughter of the chemist Martin Klaproth. He was born in Berlin and initially went to study law at Heidelberg University but gave it up after two years and transferred to the natural sciences at Berlin university where his teachers included Alexander von Humboldt, Christian Leopold von Buch and Carl Ritter. He also studied philosophy under Georg Hegel and history under Leopold Ranke. His doctoral thesis in 1831 was in Latin. His earliest scientific work is related to spinels and other minerals. Following a recommendation by von Buch, he made special studies of fumaroles, of the mineral deposits around volcanic vents, and of the structure of volcanoes, travelling to Vesuvius, Aetna, Stromboli and Lipari around 1833–34. In 1842 he was appointed professor of mineralogy in the Imperial University of Dorpat. He worked for the Russian Empire and became a member of the Petersburg Academy of Sciences in 1853. His absence from Dorpat led to his being removed from the university and being placed in the Corps of Mining Engineers under M. S. Vorontsov. He travelled to the Caucasus, Daghestan, Armenia and northern Persia. Residing for some time at Tiflis, he investigated the geology of the Armenian Highland (this term was introduced by Abich) and Caucasus. In 1844 and 1845 he ascended Ararat volcano several times, studied the geological event of 1840 that was centered on Ararat (Akori village). He discovered some Miocene mammal fossils in Maragha. At the age of 50 he married Adelaide (Adele) daughter of chemist Hermann Heinrich Hess. In 1877 he retired to Vienna, where he published two volumes on his geological explorations in the Caucasus. He received the Constantine gold medal of the Imperial Russian Geographical Society for this, and a third volume was published posthumously, edited by Eduard Suess, with a biography. He died in Vienna from appendicitis and according to his wishes, he was cremated and the ashes buried in his mother's grave in Koblenz. The mineral Abichite was named after him.

== Publications ==
Abich published more than 190 papers. The following are some of the major writings, both book and papers in journals, of Abich:

- Vues illustratives de quelques phenomenes geologiques, prises sur le Vesuve et l'Etna, pendant les annees 1833 et 1834 (Berlin, 1836);
- Ueber die Natur und den Zusammenhang der vulcanischen Bildungen (Brunswick, 1841);
- Über die geologische Natur des armenischen Hochlandes (1843)
- Vergleichende chemische Untersuchungen der Wasser des Caspi Sees, Urmia- und Van-Sees (1859)
- Über das Steinsalz und seine geologische Stellung im russischen Armenien (1859)
- Vergleichende Geologische Grundzüge der Kaukasishen, Armenischen und Nordpersischen Gebirge-Prodromus einer Geologie der Kaukasischen Länder (1859)
- Structure et Géologie du Daghestan (1862)
- Geologische Karte Apscheron (1864)
- Geologie der Halbinseln Kertsch und Taman (1865)
- Zur Kenntnis der Thermalquellen im Kaukasus (1866)
- Zur Geologie des südöstlichen Kaukasus (1866)
- Aus Kaukasischen Ländern (1869)
- Les glaciers actuelles et anciens du Caucase (1870)
- Geologische Beobachtungen auf Reisen im Kaukasus im Jahre 1873 (part 2 - 1875)
- Productivität und Geotektonische Verhältnisse der caspischen Naphtaregion (1879)
- Geologische Forschungen in den Kaukasischen Ländern (3 vols., Vienna, 1878, 1882, and 1887)
