= Akori =

Akori may refer to:

- Akori, Lori Province, Armenia
- The Armenian name of Yenidoğan, Aralık, Iğdır Province, Turkey
