= Kapan Futsal =

- Short name: Kapan
- Founded: 2017; 8 years ago
- Ground: Davit Hambardzumyan Sports School, Kapan
- President: (Armenia) Ashot Hayrapetyan
- Head Coach: (Armenia) Jean Movsisyan
- League: Armenian Futsal Premier League
Home colours	Away colours

Kapan Futsal, are an Armenian professional futsal club based in the town of Kapan, Syunik Province.

== History ==
Kapan Futsal club was founded in 2017 by the former mayor of the town of Kapan Ashot Hayrapetyan. The club participated in the 2017–18 season of the Armenian Futsal Premier League, playing their home games at the Davit Hambardzumyan Sports School of Kapan. The club's first ever competitive match took place on 1 October 2017 in Kapan, when they defeated Sh.S.U. Futsal by 9 goals to 6 in matchday 1 of the season.

At the end of their inaugural season, the team occupied the 6th position among 8 participant teams, losing the chance to advance to the final four play-off stage.

== Season by season ==
Season	Tier	Division	Pos.
2017–18	1	Premier League	6th
