= Armenian Futsal Premier League =

- Founded: 1998
- Country: Armenia
- Confederation: UEFA
- Number of clubs: 8
- Level on pyramid: 1
- International cup: UEFA Futsal Cup
- Current champions: Leo (2nd title)
- Current: Current Season at UEFA.com

The Premier League (Armenian: Հայաստանի ֆուտզալի Բարձրագույն լիգա) is the premier futsal league in Armenia. It was founded in 1998. The Premier League, which is played under UEFA rules and is organized by the Football Federation of Armenia, currently consists of 5 teams.

== 2017-18 teams ==
Currently, 8 teams are participating in the 2017-18 season:

Club	City	Arena	Capacity
Alaverdi	Alaverdi	Oleg Gorbunov Sports School	n/a
Armenia Travel	Yerevan	Mika Sports Arena	1,200
Charbakh	Yerevan	Mika Sports Arena	1,200
Kapan	Kapan	Davit Hambardzumyan Sports School	n/a
Leo	Yerevan	Mika Sports Arena	1,200
Sh.S.U. Futsal	Gyumri	Aram Sargsyan Sports Hall	350
Shirak	Gyumri	Aram Sargsyan Sports Hall	350
VSU Futsal	Vanadzor	Armenia Sports Arena	950

== Champions ==
Season	Winner
1998/99	Yerevan
1999/00	Araks Yerevan
2000/01	Hayk Yerevan
2001/02	Hayk Yerevan
2002/03	Hayk Yerevan
2003/04	Polytechnic Yerevan
2004/05	Talgrig Yerevan
2005/06	Adana Yerevan
2006/07	Polytechnic Yerevan
2007/08	Polytechnic Yerevan
2008/09	Erebuni Futsal
2009/10	Kaghsi Hrazdan
2010/11	Erebuni Futsal
2011/12	Shahumyan Futsal
2012/13	Shahumyan Futsal
2013/14	Talgrig Yerevan
2014/15	ASUE Futsal
2015/16	ASUE Futsal
2016/17	Leo
2017/18	Leo
2018/19	Leo
2019/20	No champion due to the COVID-19 pandemic
2020/21	Yerevan
2021/22	Yerevan
2022/23	Yerevan
2023/24	Yerevan
2024/25	Yerevan

== See also ==
- Armenia national futsal team
- Football in Armenia
- Sport in Armenia
