= Leo Futsal =

- Short name: Leo
- Founded: 2016; 9 years ago
- Ground: Mika Sports Arena, Yerevan, Armenia
- Capacity: 1,200
- President: (Armenia) Karen Hakobyan
- Head Coach: (Russia) Vladislav Vladyshenkov
- League: Armenian Futsal Premier League
- 2017–18: Premier League, 1st (2nd title)
- Website: http://www.fcleo.am/
Home colours	Away colours

Leo Futsal, is an Armenian professional futsal club, playing in the Armenian Futsal Premier League. The club was founded in 2016 in Yerevan. In 2016-2017 it won the Armenian Futsal Premier League and got a chance to participate in UEFA Champions League. In the first season of Armenian Futsal Premier League, Leo had 129 goals and 41 goals in the second season. The first season of UEFA was held in Cyprus and the second season in Croatia. In 2017-2018 Leo Club won the Armenian Futsal Premier League one more time and went on to take part in the Champions League in Sweden. Currently, it continues its activities in the 2018-2019 Armenian Futsal Premier League.

== Statistics ==
Biggest Win (In Armenia)	Biggest Defeat (in Armenia)	UEFA Futsal Cup
Leo 23-1 Artik (01.10.2016)	Charbakh 6-2 Leo (20.05.2017)	Appearances: 6 (First in 2017)
Biggest Win (International)	Biggest Defeat (International)	Futsal Champions League
Classic Chishinau 0-7 Leo (2017)		Appearances: 3 (First in 2018)

== Goals ==
Year	Season	Division	Goals	Position
2016–17	1	Premier League	129	1st
2016-17	2	Premier League	41	1st

== Players ==
=== Current squad ===
As of 12 March 2019

#	Position	Name	Nationality
1	Goalkeeper	Artur Mkrtchyan	(Armenia)
2	Defender	Hakob Uzunyan (captain)	(Armenia)
4	Defender	Ashot Qartashyan	(Armenia)
5	Winger	Garegin Mashumyan	(Armenia)
7	Winger	Khachik Miqayelyan	(Armenia)
8	Defender	Gegham Martirosyan	(Armenia)
9	Defender	Saro Mardanyan	(Armenia)
10	Winger	Saro Galstyan	(Armenia)
11	Winger	Gor Sargsyan	(Armenia)
13	Winger	Andranik Mheryan	(Armenia)
17	Winger	Andranik Karapetyan	(Armenia)
19	Winger	Edvard Mkrtchyan	(Armenia)
20	Defender	Sargis Nasibyan	(Armenia)

=== List of Legioners ===
As of 12 March 2019

#	Name	Nationality	Date
13	De Souza	(Brazil)	2019
1	Deivid Chaves	(Brazil)	2016-2017
2	Sãul Olmo Campaña	(Spain)	2017
3	Sergei Loginov	(Russia)	2017
4	Slobodan Tomic	(Serbia)	2017
5	João silva	(Portugal)	2017
6	Ali Al-Ioani	(Romania)	2017
7	Marko Radanović	(Serbia)	2017-2018
8	Slobodan Janjic	(Serbia)	2017-2018
9	Lucas	(Brazil)	2017-2018
10	Greuto Carvalho	(Brazil)	2017-2018
11	Ronney Daniel	(Brazil)	2017-2018
12	Matheus Ramires	(Brazil)	2017-2018
13	Nikolay Pereverzev	(Russia)	2017-2018
14	Yevhen Ivanyak	(Ukraine)	2018

=== Technical staff ===
Head coach	(Russia) Vyacheslav Vladyshenkov
Manager	(Armenia) Anna Petrosyan
