= Shirak SC Futsal =

- Short name: Shirak
- Founded: 1998; 27 years ago (as Gyumri Futsal)
- Ground: Aram Sargsyan Sports Hall, Gyumri
- Capacity: 350
- President: (Armenia) Arman Sahakyan
- Head Coach: (Armenia) Styopa Mkrtchyan
- League: Armenian Futsal Premier League
- 2016–17: Premier League, 4th
- Website: http://fcshirak.am
| Home colours | Away colours |

Shirak SC Futsal, is the professional futsal section of Shirak SC, an association football club based in Gyumri, Armenia.

== History ==
The team was founded in 1998 as Gyumri Futsal to become one of the founding members of the Armenian Futsal Premier League. The team has participated in every single season of the futsal league since 1998. In September 2017, as a result of financial difficulties, the club became part of the Shirak SC family and re-branded as Shirak SC Futsal starting from the 2017-18 season. They currently play their home games at the Aram Sargsyan Sports Hall of Gyumri.

== Season by season ==
Here is the final position of the club season by season since 2004.

| Season | Tier | Division | Pos. |
|---|---|---|---|
| 2004-05 | 1 | Premier League | 5th |
| 2005-06 | 1 | Premier League | 5th |
| 2006-07 | 1 | Premier League | 3rd |
| 2007-08 | 1 | Premier League | 5th |
| 2008-09 | 1 | Premier League | 6th |
| 2010 | 1 | Premier League | 3rh |
| 2010-11 | 1 | Premier League | 5th |
| 2011-12 | 1 | Premier League | 3rd |
| 2012–13 | 1 | Premier League | 4th |
| 2013–14 | 1 | Premier League | 3rd |
| 2014–15 | 1 | Premier League | 3rd |
| 2015–16 | 1 | Premier League | 3rd |
| 2016–17 | 1 | Premier League | 4th |
| 2017–18 | 1 | Premier League | 3rd |
