= Horomayr Monastery =

Monastic complex in Lori Province, Armenia

Horomayri Monastery Հոռոմայրի վանք
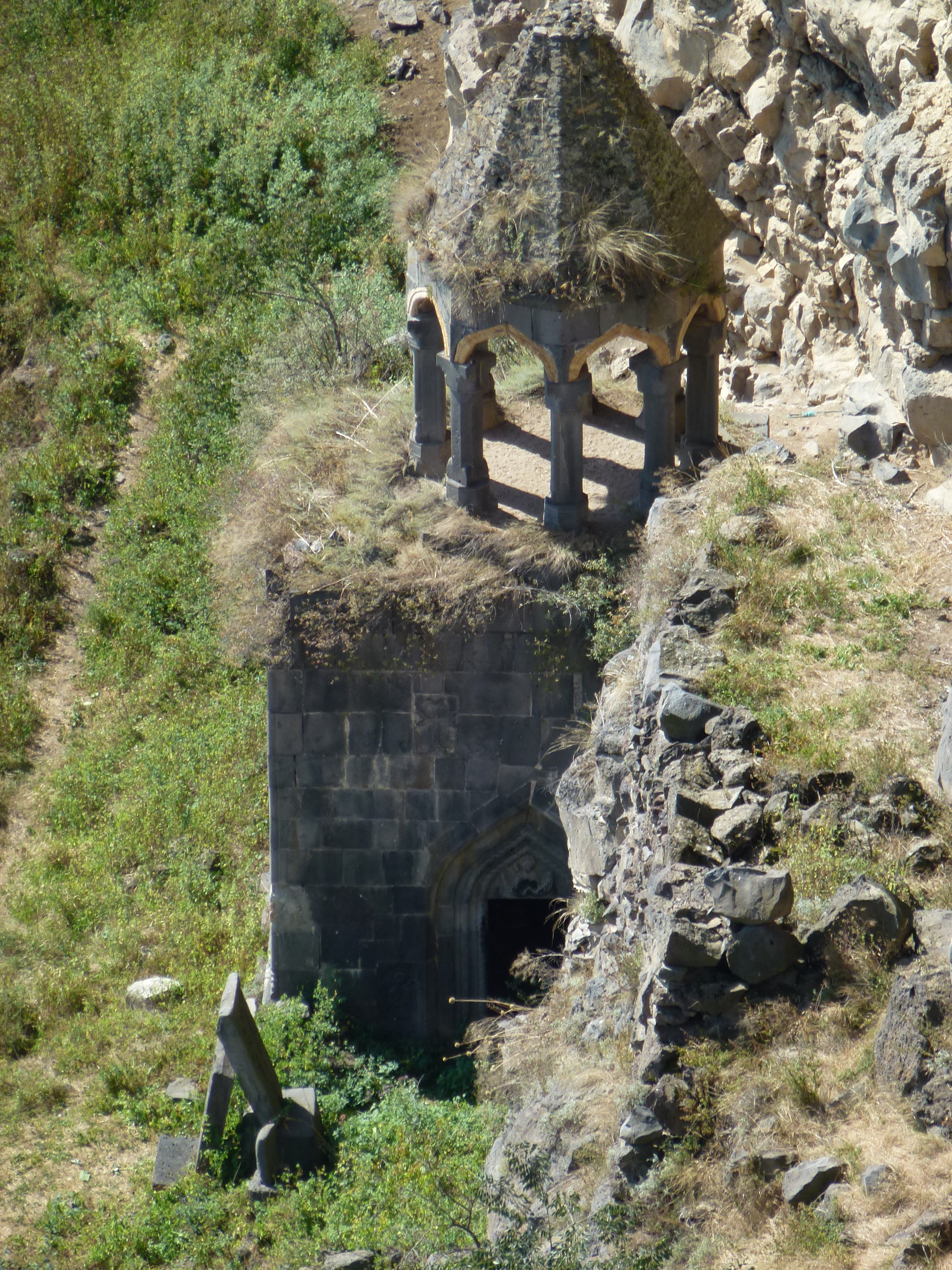

- Location within Armenia

Religion
- Affiliation: Armenian Apostolic Church

Location
- Location: Odzun, Lori Province, Armenia
- Coordinates: 41.035039°N 44.628039°E

Architecture
- Style: Armenian

Horomayr Monastery (Armenian: Հոռոմայրի վանք) is a monastic complex in the Lori Province of Armenia. The monastery is built on the cliffs 1 km south of the village of Odzun. It is easiest to get to Odzun from Alaverdi via the town's public transport. To get to the site, the visitor may climb up from the highway along the Debed River, or hike south across the cliffs from the last switchback to Odzun. The fastest but hardest route is to climb down the cliff south of Odzun.

The monastery is built in part at the top of the cliff, in part halfway down. At the top, there is a three-chambered chapel. Below, the walls of the canyon form one of the four walls of the structures. There are caves within the monastic complex, khachkars, and carvings. St Mark's Church was built by the Princes Zakare and Ivane Mkhargrdzeli in 1187. The other buildings were built by Abbot Samuel in 1206.

The bottom monument complexes of Horomayr are stretched in the same way as the main church of St. Virgin in the convent of Bardzrakash St. Gregory for the same reasons: highly constrained terrain.
