= Alaverdi, Armenia =

City in Lori, Armenia

Alaverdi
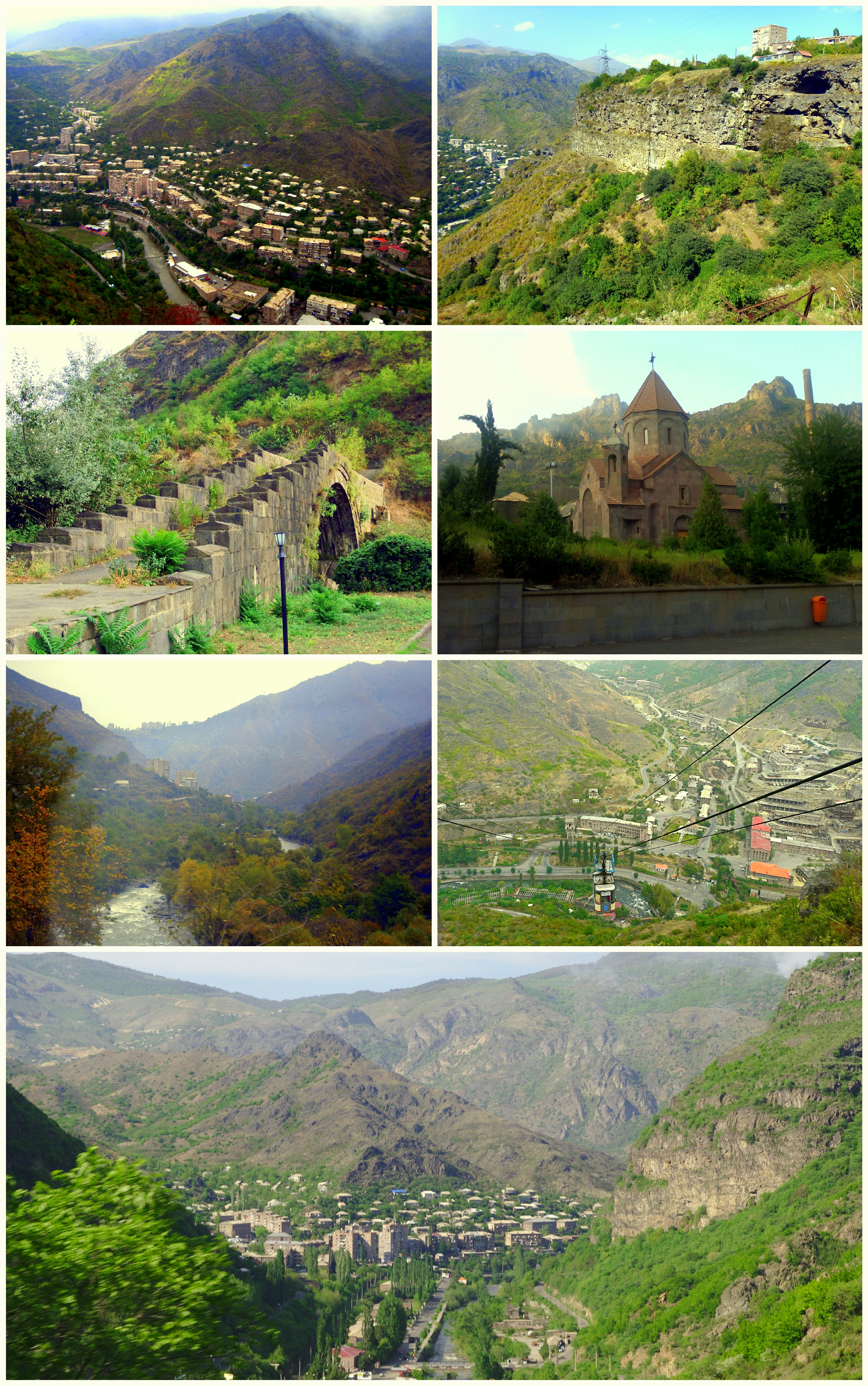
- From top left: Alaverdi skyline • Old caves in Alaverdi; Sanahin Bridge • Gregory of Narek Church; Debed River • The copper combine and cable car Panoramic view of Alaverdi

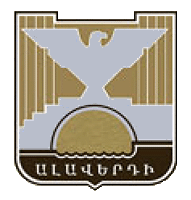
- Coat of arms

- Location within Armenia
- Coordinates: 41°08′N 44°39′E
- Country: Armenia
- Province: Lori
- Founded: 1899

Area
  - Total: 18 km^{2} (6.9 sq mi)
- Elevation: 715 m (2,346 ft)

Population (2026)
  - Total: 11,500
- Time zone: UTC+4 (AMT)
- Area code: (+374) 253
- Website: Official website

Alaverdi (Armenian: Ալավերդի, Armenian pronunciation: [ɑlɑvɛɾˈdi], Greek: Αλαβερντί), is a city and municipal community in the Lori Province at the northeastern part of Armenia, near the border with Georgia. It is located at the only direct rail link between Armenia and Georgia. Situated at the bottom of the Debed river gorge, Alaverdi is an important commercial and industrial centre in northern Armenia.

As of the 2022 census, the population of the town is 12,152, down from 12,243 reported in 2011 and 26,300 reported in 1989. Currently, the town has an approximate population of 11,000 as per the 2016 official estimate.

== Etymology ==
Historically, the area around Alaverdi was known as Manasgomer or Manits Gom during the medieval period. Starting from the 17th century, the settlement became known as Alaverdi, derived from the name of a 17th-century Iranian Turkic Borçalı tribe leader Allahverdi Mollaoğlu Tarkhan.

However, Alaverdi was formed as a settlement known as Manes (from historical Manits Gom) only in 1899, when the copper smelter was opened near the village of Madan (currently part of Alaverdi) at the northern outskirts of Sanahin village and residential barracks were built to accommodate the laborers of the smelter.

== History ==
Excavations conducted in 1931 testify that the region of modern-day Alaverdi was most probably settled during the 1st half of the 2nd millennium BC. Later, the region became part of the Urartu Kingdom between the 8th and 6th centuries BC. After the Achaemenid invasion, the region became part of the Satrapy of Armenia. With the establishment of the Kingdom of Armenia in 331 BC, the region became part of the Dzorapor canton of the historic Gugark, the 13th province of Greater Armenia.

Following the partition of Armenia in 387 between the Byzantine Empire and Sassanid Persia, and the subsequent collapse of Arsacid Armenia in 428, Eastern Armenia including Dzorapor region became under the rule of Sassanid Persia. In 658, Armenia was conquered by the Arab invaders. At the end of the 9th century, Dzorapor became part of the newly established Bagratid Kingdom of Armenia. In 979, King Kiurike I founded the Kingdom of Tashir-Dzoraget (alternatively known as the Kingdom of Lori) under the rule of the Kiurikian dynasty and the protectorate of the Bagratid kings of Armenia. The Kiurikians ruled the kingdom until 1118 when Tashir-Dzoraget became part of the Kingdom of Georgia.

The Seljuks invaded the region in the early 12th century, but their rule did not last long and in 1118-1122 the Georgian king David the Builder conquered Lori and granted the rule to the Georgian-Armenian Orbelian Dynasty. The Orbelians revolted unsuccessfully in 1177, after which a Kipchak named Khubasari was appointed spasalari of Lori. Later in 1185, the province became ruled by the Zakarian dynasty after Queen Tamar of Georgia appointed the Zakarid prince Sarkis as its governor. Between the 11th and 13th centuries, and with the establishment of the monasteries of Haghpat and Sanahin and Odzun, the region modern-day Alaverdi became a prominent centre of Armenian culture, theology and science. Scholars such as Hovhannes Imastaser, Grigor Tuteordi, Davit Kobayretsi, Grigor Magistros worked in these monasteries. However, the region was devastated by the Mongol invasion of 1236, and the Zakarian dynasty declined by the second half of the 14th century.

Lori was annexed by Safavid Persia as a result of the 1555 Peace of Amasya and became part of Persia's Kartli-Kakheti province. After Nader Shah's murder in 1747, the Georgian kingdoms of Kartli and Kakheti became independent and united into a single kingdom by 1762. In 1801, together with the Georgian provinces of Kartli and Kakheti, Lori was annexed by the Russian Empire. The region became officially part of the Russian Empire at the Treaty of Gulistan signed on 1 January 1813 between Imperial Russia and Qajar Persia. Administratively, the region was part of the Borchali uyezd within the Tiflis Governorate of the Russian Empire.

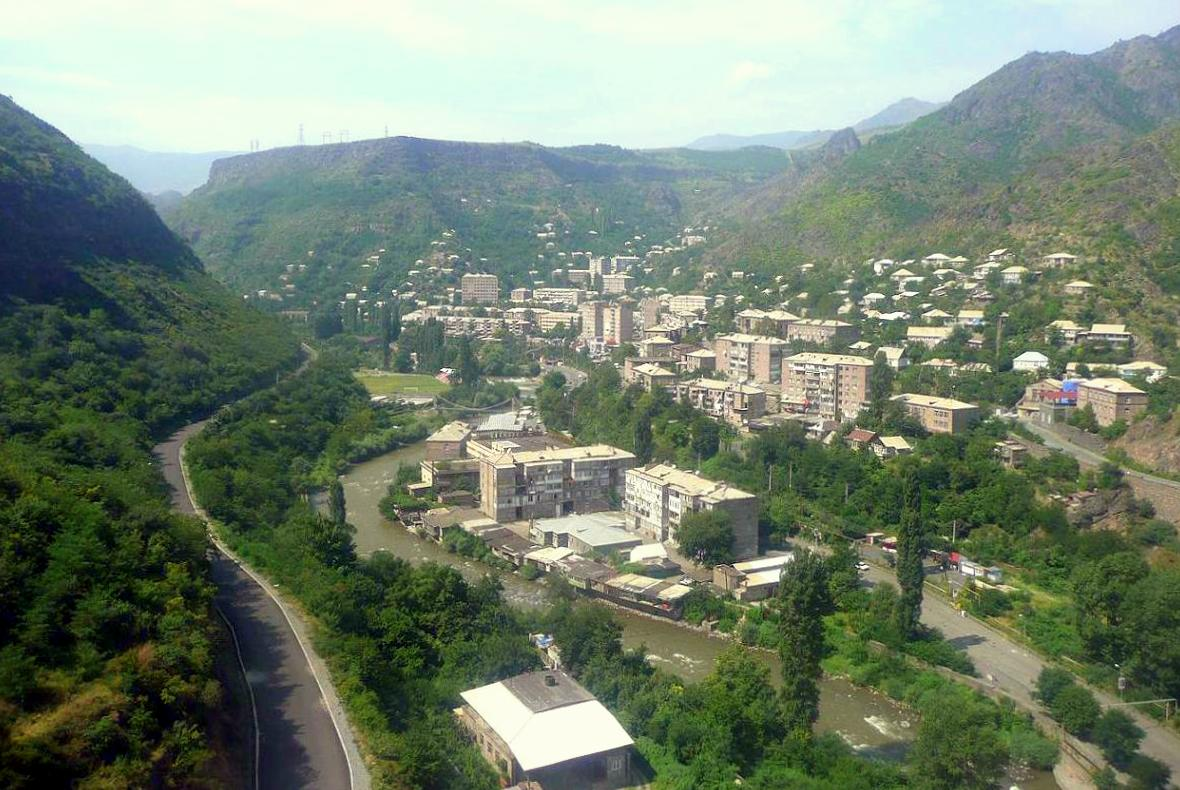
General view of Alaverdi

Under the Russian rule, a number of Pontic Greek miners were resettled in the area during the 18th century to start exploiting copper, through the efforts of the Argoutinski-Dolgoruki family. Soon after, nearly a quarter of the entire Russian copper supply was being mined in Alaverdi. At the end of the 19th century, the concession to exploit the mine was sold to a French firm. With the establishment of the Tbilisi-Alexandropol railway in 1899, a new copper smelter was opened near the village of Madan between Sanahin and Akori, to set the foundation for a new settlement that became the residence of the smelter staff. The newly founded settlement was renamed Manés.

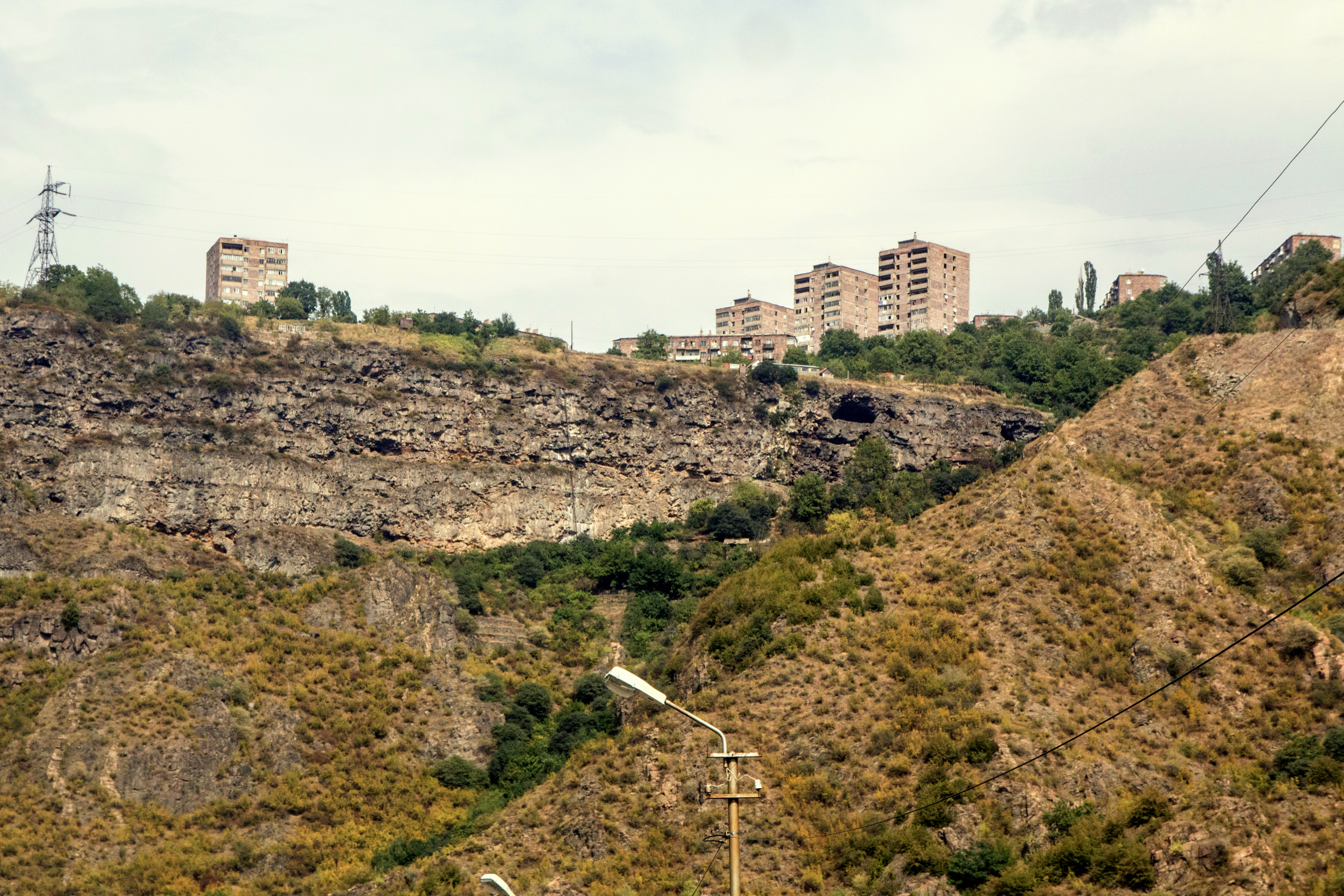
Soviet-era buildings

In May 1918, Lori became part of the newly formed Republic of Armenia. In late 1918, Armenia and Georgia fought a border war over Lori. In January 1919, the Lori neutral zone was established by the British forces. Following Armenia's sovietization in December 1920, Lori – including Manes – was finally incorporated into Soviet Armenia on 11 February 1921.

Under the Soviet rule, the first major plan of Manes was introduced in 1929-1930 by architect Mikayel Mazmanyan. Manes was renamed Alaverdi in 1935 and granted the status of an urban-type settlement in 1938 to become the centre of Alaverdi raion. With the gradual progress of the town as a major industrial centre of Soviet Armenia, the major plan of the town was revised and developed in 1946 by architect Hrayr Isabekyan to acquire its current socialist industrial appearance. Between 1959 and 1962, based on the design of architect Levon Cherkezyan, the southern half of the town was built in the Sanahin plateau on the right bank of the Debed river.

Sanahin native Anastas Mikoyan visited Alaverdi and Sanahin numerous times, most notably in March 1962. Mikoyan frequently advised Soviet Armenian officials on various economic development projects in the Alaverdi region, especially during the Khrushchev Thaw. Following the independence of Armenia in 1991, Alaverdi was included within the newly formed Lori Province, as per the 1995 administrative reforms. The municipal community of Alaverdi includes the nearby rural settlement of Akner as well. Considered one of the leading industrial plants in the region, the Alaverdi copper smelter has been operated by the ACP company since its privatization in 1997.

== Geography and climate ==
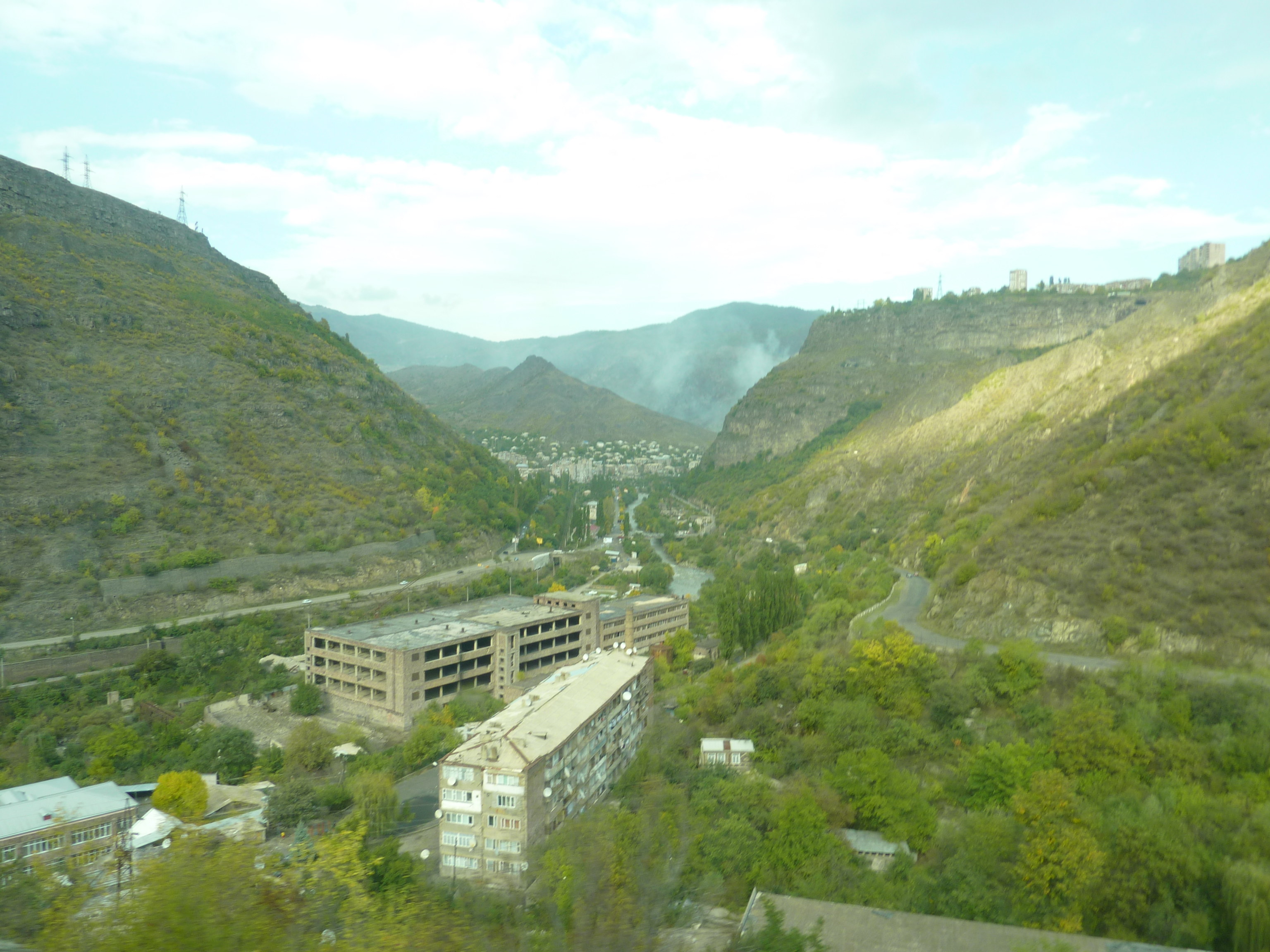
Debed river canyon

Alaverdi is on the shores of Debed river canyon 1,000 meters (3,300 feet) above sea level, surrounded by high mountains and green forests. The Debed river flows through the centre of the town dividing it into two parts. The older northern half of Alaverdi is in the Debed canyon, and the newer southern half of the town is on the Sanahin plateau. It is surrounded by large villages including Sanahin at the southeast, Haghpat at the east, Akori at the west, and Odzun at the southwest. The Somkheti mountains dominate over the town from the north and the northwest while the Pambak mountains dominate from the south and the southwest. The Lalvar peak with a height of 2,544 meters (8,346 feet) is at the northwest of the town.

Alaverdi has a cold semi-arid climate (BSk) according to the Köppen climate classification.

Climate data for Alaverdi
Month	Jan	Feb	Mar	Apr	May	Jun	Jul	Aug	Sep	Oct	Nov	Dec	Year
Mean daily maximum °C (°F)	0.6 (33.1)	2 (36)	5.8 (42.4)	10.5 (50.9)	15 (59)	19.2 (66.6)	22.1 (71.8)	22.8 (73.0)	18.2 (64.8)	13.1 (55.6)	7.1 (44.8)	2.6 (36.7)	11.6 (52.9)
Daily mean °C (°F)	−7.4 (18.7)	−5.5 (22.1)	−1 (30)	6 (43)	11.1 (52.0)	14.3 (57.7)	17.6 (63.7)	17.7 (63.9)	13.6 (56.5)	7.9 (46.2)	1.9 (35.4)	−3.9 (25.0)	6.1 (43.0)
Mean daily minimum °C (°F)	−11 (12)	−8.9 (16.0)	−4.9 (23.2)	0.1 (32.2)	5.3 (41.5)	9.8 (49.6)	13.2 (55.8)	13.6 (56.5)	9.5 (49.1)	4.1 (39.4)	−3.1 (26.4)	−8.5 (16.7)	1.6 (34.9)
Average precipitation mm (inches)	23 (0.9)	27 (1.1)	35 (1.4)	67 (2.6)	111 (4.4)	104 (4.1)	64 (2.5)	49 (1.9)	45 (1.8)	41 (1.6)	31 (1.2)	22 (0.9)	615 (24.2)
Average precipitation days	5	6	11	15	17	13	9	8	9	9	6	5	113
Source: alaverdi.am, climate-data.org

== Demographics ==
=== Population and ethnic groups ===
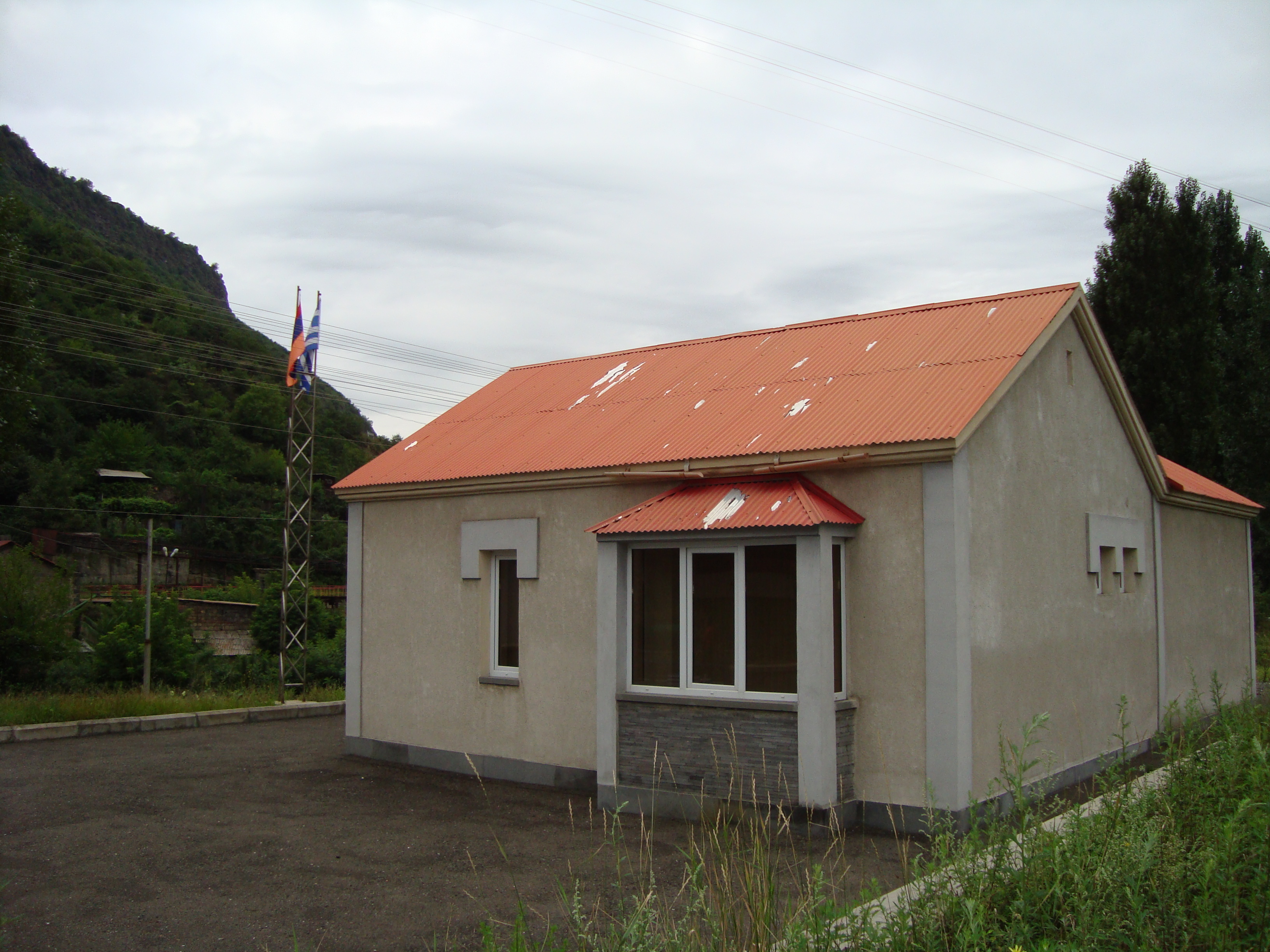
Greek community centre in Alaverdi

Alaverdi is mainly inhabited by ethnic Armenians with a minor Greek community that was once considered the largest in Armenia. The Greeks in Armenia speak the Pontic dialect and they are fluent in both Armenian and Russian.

The Madan neighbourhood of Alaverdi used to have a large Greek community during the Soviet period.

Historical population
Year	Pop.	±% p.a.
1907	3,250	—
1916	1,185	−10.60%
1926	4,500	+14.27%
1939	10,010	+6.34%
1959	16,805	+2.62%
1970	23,311	+3.02%
1979	23,182	−0.06%
1989	14,835	−4.37%
2001	16,641	+0.96%
2011	13,343	−2.18%
2022	12,152	−0.85%

=== Religion ===
The majority of Alaverdi are ethnic Armenians who belong to the Armenian Apostolic Church. The regulating body of the church is the Diocese of Gougark, headed by Archbishop Sebouh Chouldjian (seat in Vanadzor).

The church of Saint Gregory of Narek opened in November 2001 is the town's church. It was built through the efforts of the Alaverdi Copper Smelter, the Diocese of Gougark and the local citizens of the town.

== Culture ==
The Mikoyan Brothers Museum in Sanahin honors the brothers Anastas and Artem Mikoyan.

The Alaverdi municipal theatre founded in 1932 by Armen Armenyan is among the most significant theatres of Armenia that produced many prominent artists.

The Alaverdi traditional music band was formed in 1937 and toured all over the Soviet major cities. The band performed in Germany, France and Belgium as well. The town has also a drama theatre. It consists of a large theatre hall and a big public library.

The National Gallery of Armenia opened its Alaverdi branch in 1987.

In 1997, the Alaverdi cultural palace was opened. It is also home to the public library of the town.

As of 2009, Alaverdi is home to a music academy named after Romanos Melikian, as well as three schools with a total of 600 students.

=== Historical monuments ===
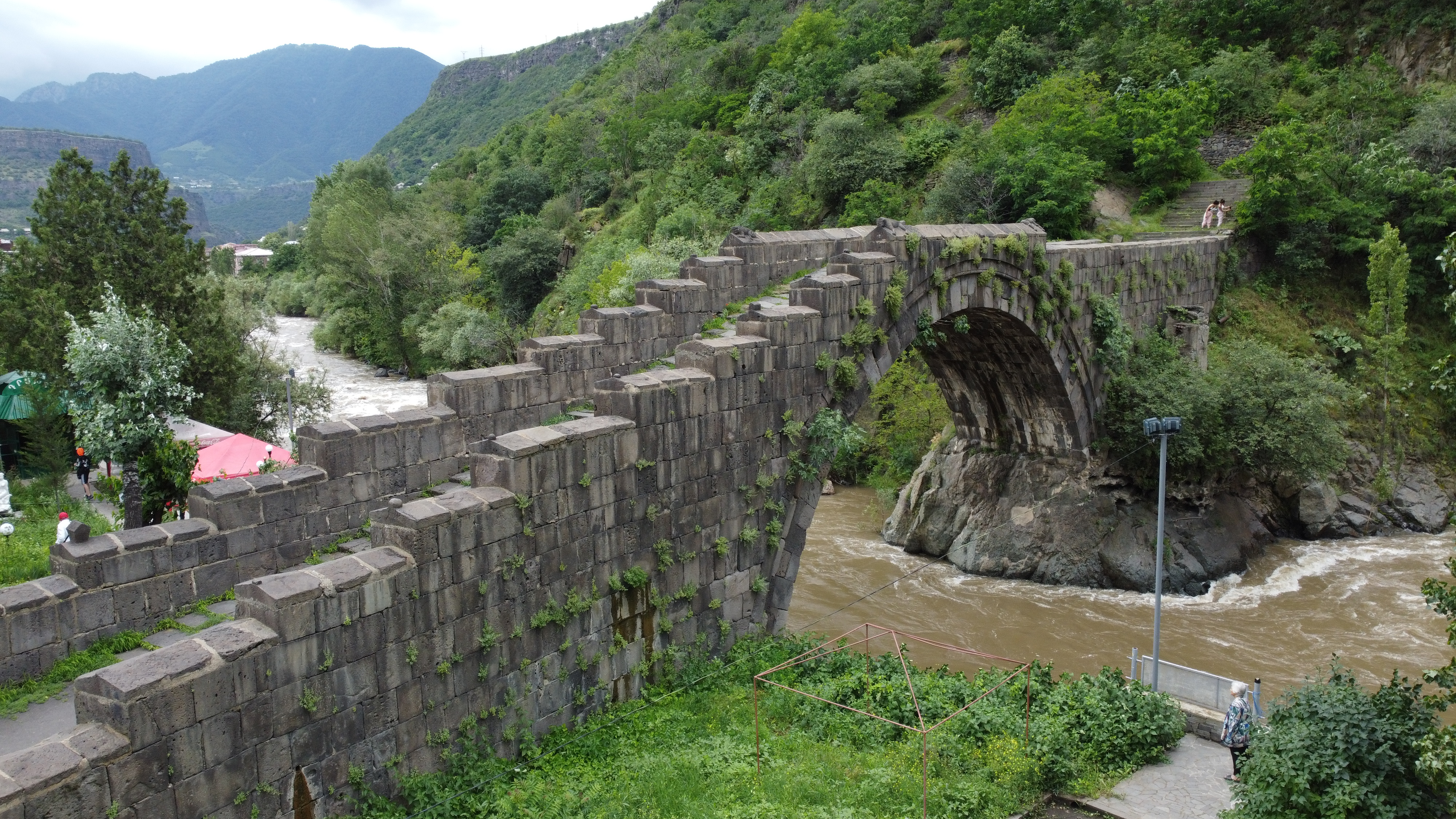
The late 12th century Sanahin Bridge.

The area around Alaverdi is rich with historical monuments and natural life. Many samples of the Armenian architectural heritage are located near the town including:

- Odzun Church of the 5th century,
- Horomayr Monastery of the 7th century near Odzun village,
- Surp Hovhannes Monastery of Ardvi, 8th-13th centuries,
- Kaytson Castle of the 10th century located near the shores of Debed river,
- Kayan Fortress, built by King Ashot Yerkat in the 10th century near Alaverdi,
- Sanahin Monastery of the 10th century,
- Haghpat Monastery of the 10th century,
- Church of the Forty Martyrs of the 11th century,
- The Sanahin Bridge on Debed river, dating to 1192.

== Transportation ==
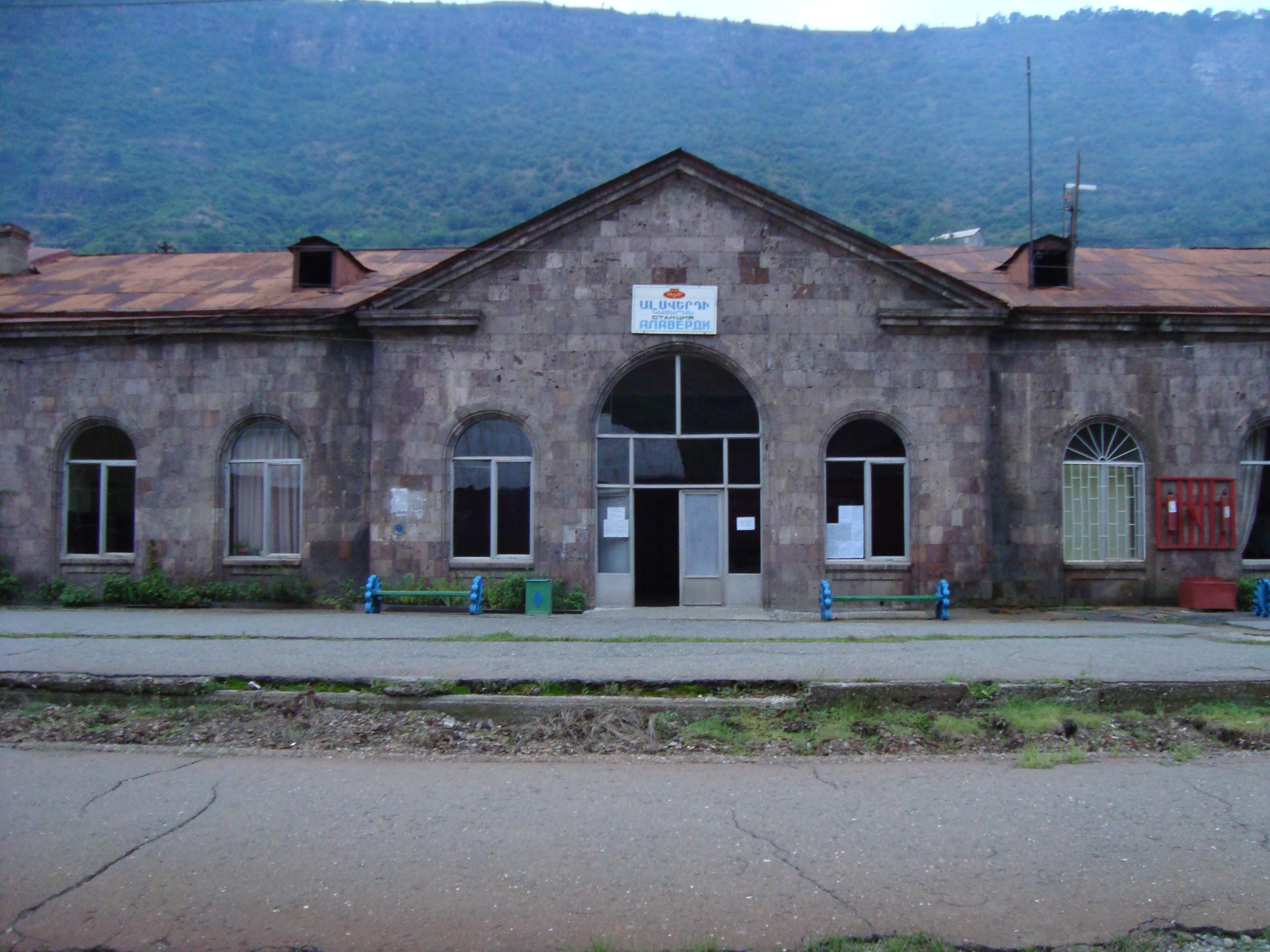
Alaverdi railway station

Alaverdi is a major railway station on the Yerevan-Gyumri-Tbilisi line. The railway is functioning since 1899 and currently connecting the town with western and central Armenia, as well as Georgia.

The M-6 Motorway that connects Yerevan with Tbilisi, passes through Alaverdi.

The southern half of the town is connected with its northern counterpart through bridges over the Debed river. It used to be connected by a cableway that was built in 1977, but it has been out of operation since a 2014 lightning strike.

The nearest airport to Alaverdi is the Stepanavan Airport (currently being reconstructed) located 51 km west of the town.

== Economy ==
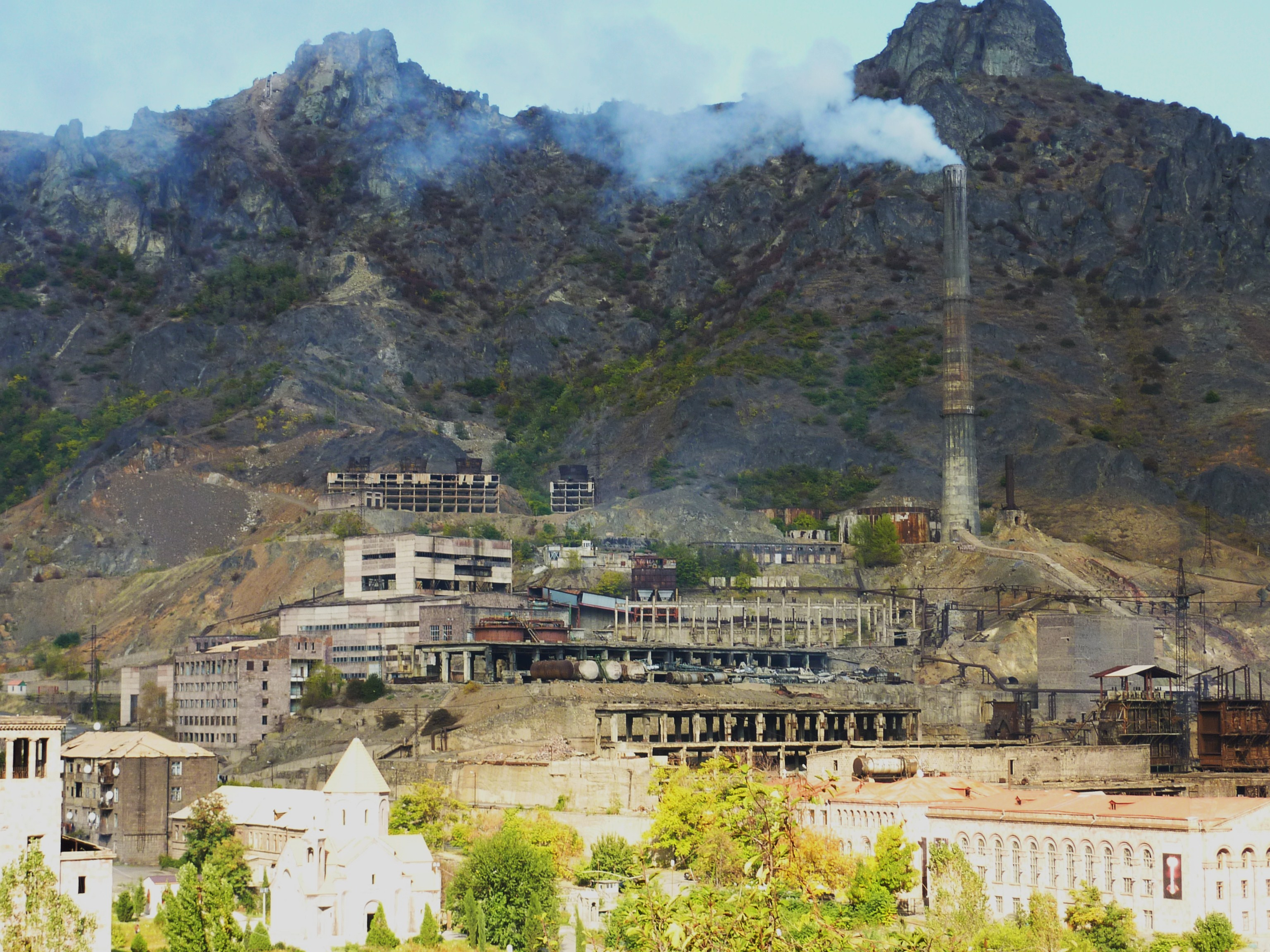
Alaverdi Copper Smelter

During the Georgian rule over Alaverdi region, the Alaverdi Copper Smelter was founded in 1770, by the order of Georgian king Erekle II. At the end of the 19th century, the region was flourished through the growing Russian and French investments in metallurgical business. In 1903, the amount of copper produced in Alaverdi region made around 13% of the total copper production in the Russian Empire.

By the end of 1909, the hydropower plant of Debed river was inaugurated in order to provide the developing metallurgical plants with sufficient energy.

During the Soviet rule, massive construction works were carried on in Alaverdi, including the surrounding areas of Sanahin and other villages. The Soviets made significant steps for the enlargement of the metallurgical industry in the region, which has turned Alaverdi from a small industrial settlement to a modern town within Soviet Armenia.

Recently, new plans were introduced for the expansion of copper production in Alaverdi smelter and the development of new copper mines within the frameworks of the "Armenian Copper" project. The factory provides employs roughly 500 workers.

== Education ==
Gugark province was one of the major educational centres throughout the history of Armenia. The historic University of Sanahin opened in 966 AD by the efforts of the Bagratuni queen Khosrovanush, was located in the area of modern-day Sanahin village at the southeastern outskirts of Alaverdi.

Currently, the town is one of the important educational centres of Lori province. As of 2009, 10 public education schools are operating in Alaverdi with around 2,000 students. On the other hand, around 400 kids in the town are served by 6 kindergartens. The Alaverdi state intermediate college offers an opportunity of study in pedagogy with a duration of 2 years, while the Tumanynan branch of the Northern University offers degrees in nursing and dental prosthesis.

== Sport ==
=== Football ===
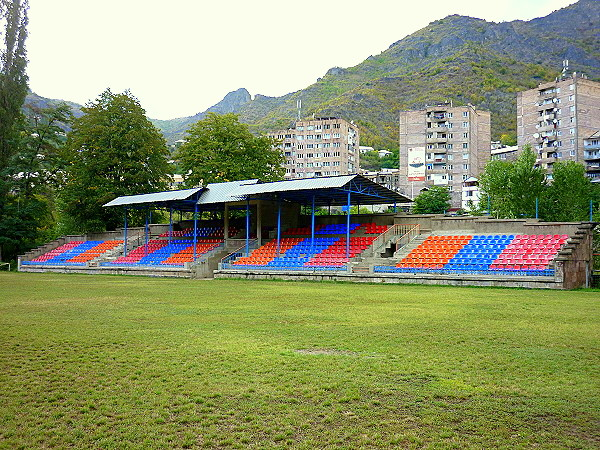
Metallurg Stadium

Alaverdi is one of the major centres of sports in Armenia. In 1936, the Metallurg Football Club of Alaverdi had participated in the lower levels of the first ever Soviet football championship, representing the Armenian SSR.

After the independence of Armenia in 1991, Debed FC represented the town in the Armenian Premier League during the 1992 season. However, like many other Armenian football clubs, Debed FC was dissolved in 1993 and is currently inactive from professional football.

In general, the sports infrastructure in Alaverdi is very poor, but some plans have been implemented by the Football Federation of Armenia to promote the game in the region. Therefore, the town's only Metallurg Stadium, was renovated to serve the young footballers and sport schools of the Lori Province.

=== Other sports ===
During the Soviet period, Alaverdi used to have a strong handball team. The handball training school of Alaverdi named after Oleg Gorbunov (Soviet handball player during the 1960s), is still operating in since 1962. Other specialized schools for chess and boxing are also operating in the town since 2006.

Alaverdi Futsal represents the town in the Futsal League of Armenia, playing their games at the Oleg Gorbunov Sports School.

== Notable people ==
- Svetlana Navasardyan, concert pianist

== Twin towns – sister cities ==
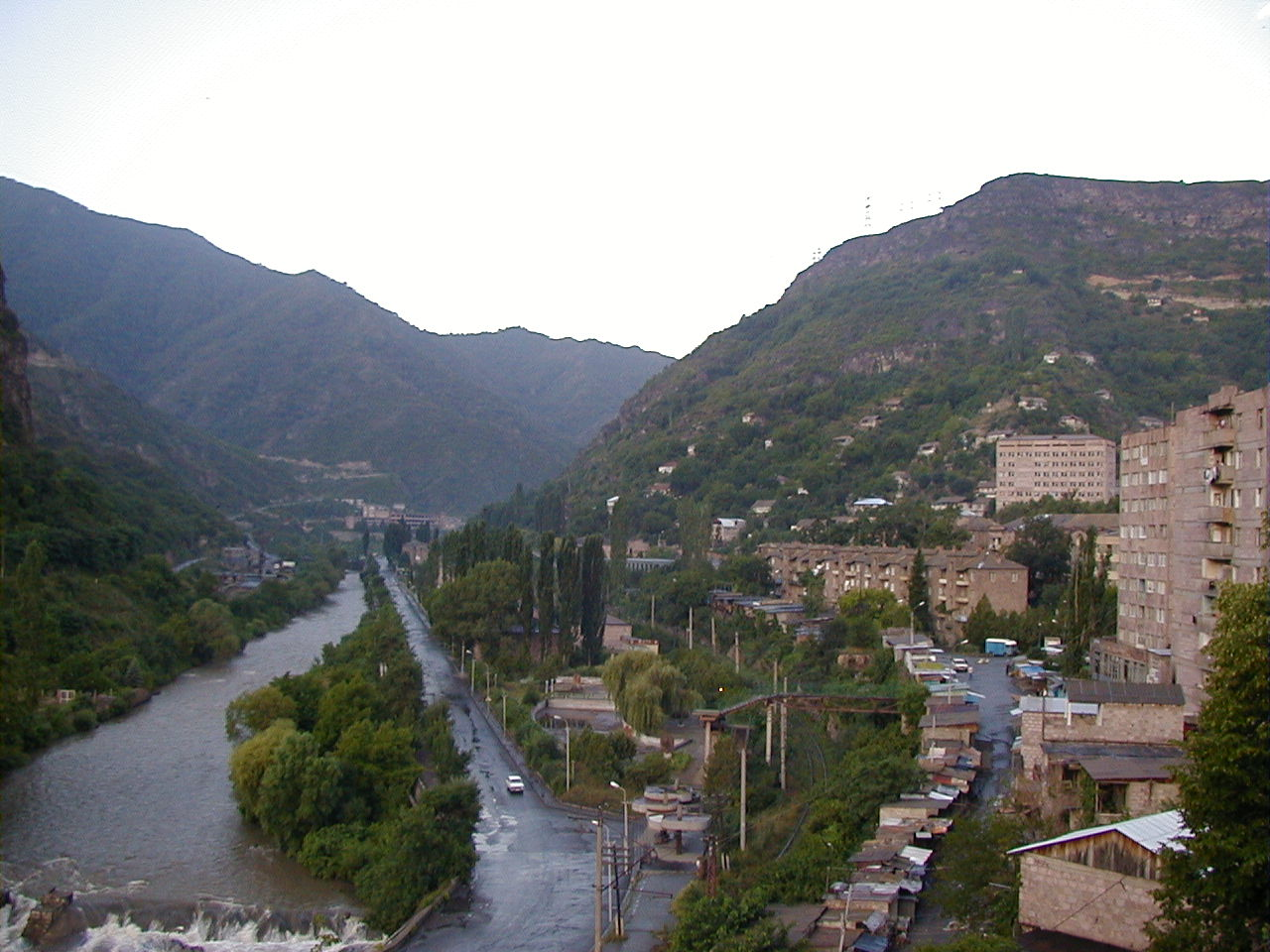
Downtown Alaverdi

- (Georgia (country)) Kobuleti, Georgia, since 28 May 2007.
- Nikaia-Agios Ioannis Rentis, Greece, since 1 October 2007.
- Polotsk, Belarus, since 26 May 2012.
- Daugavpils, Latvia, since 2 October 2012.
- Gheorgheni, Romania, 25 September 2014.
