= Debed FC =

Debed
- Full name: Football Club Debed Alaverdi
- Founded: 1938; 87 years ago
- Dissolved: 1993; 32 years ago
- Ground: Metallurg Stadium, Alaverdi
- Capacity: 743

Debed FC (Armenian: Դեբեդ Ֆուտբոլային Ակումբ), is a defunct Armenian football club from Alaverdi, Lori Province. Founded in 1938, Debed is one of the oldest football clubs in Armenia. However, the club was dissolved in early 1993 and is currently inactive from professional football.

== League record ==
Year	Club Name	Division	Position	GP	W	D	L	GS	GA	PTS
1990	Debed FC	Armenian SSR League	22	30	6	4	20	47	80	16
1991	-	unknown	-	-	-	-	-	-	-	-
1992	Debed FC	Armenian Premier League	23	22	4	5	13	35	68	13
1993–present	-	no participation	-	-	-	-	-	-	-	-
