= Metallurg Stadium, Alaverdi =

Football stadium in Alaverdi, Armenia

Coordinates: 41°05′47″N 44°38′55″E

Metallurg Stadium
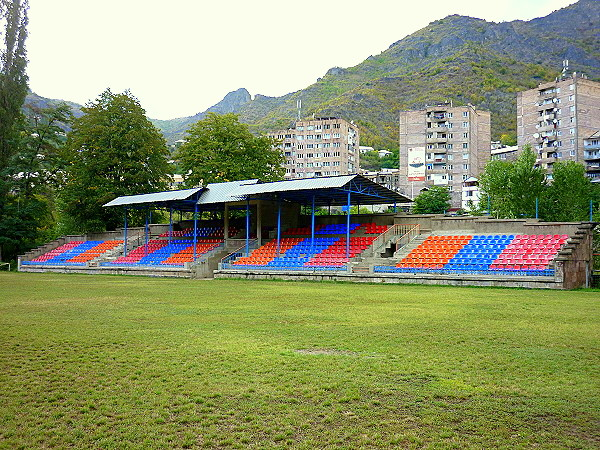
- Metallurg Stadium
- Interactive map of Metallurg Stadium
- Location: Alaverdi, Armenia
- Owner: "Armenian Copper Programme" CJS Company
- Capacity: 743
- Surface: grass

Construction
- Built: 1970

Tenant
- Debed (1970-1993)

Metallurg Stadium (Armenian: Մետալուրգ Մարզադաշտ) is an all-seater football stadium in Alaverdi, Armenia.

== Overview ==
Metallurg Stadium was built in 1970 on the right bank of Debed river. Between 1970 and 1993, it served as a home venue for the local football team Debed during the Armenian Premier League matches.

Currently the stadium is owned by the "Armenian Copper Programme" Closed Joint-Stock Company of Vallex Group, and holds a capacity of 743 seats.

It is mainly used as a training ground by the local youth teams of the Lori Province.

== Gallery ==
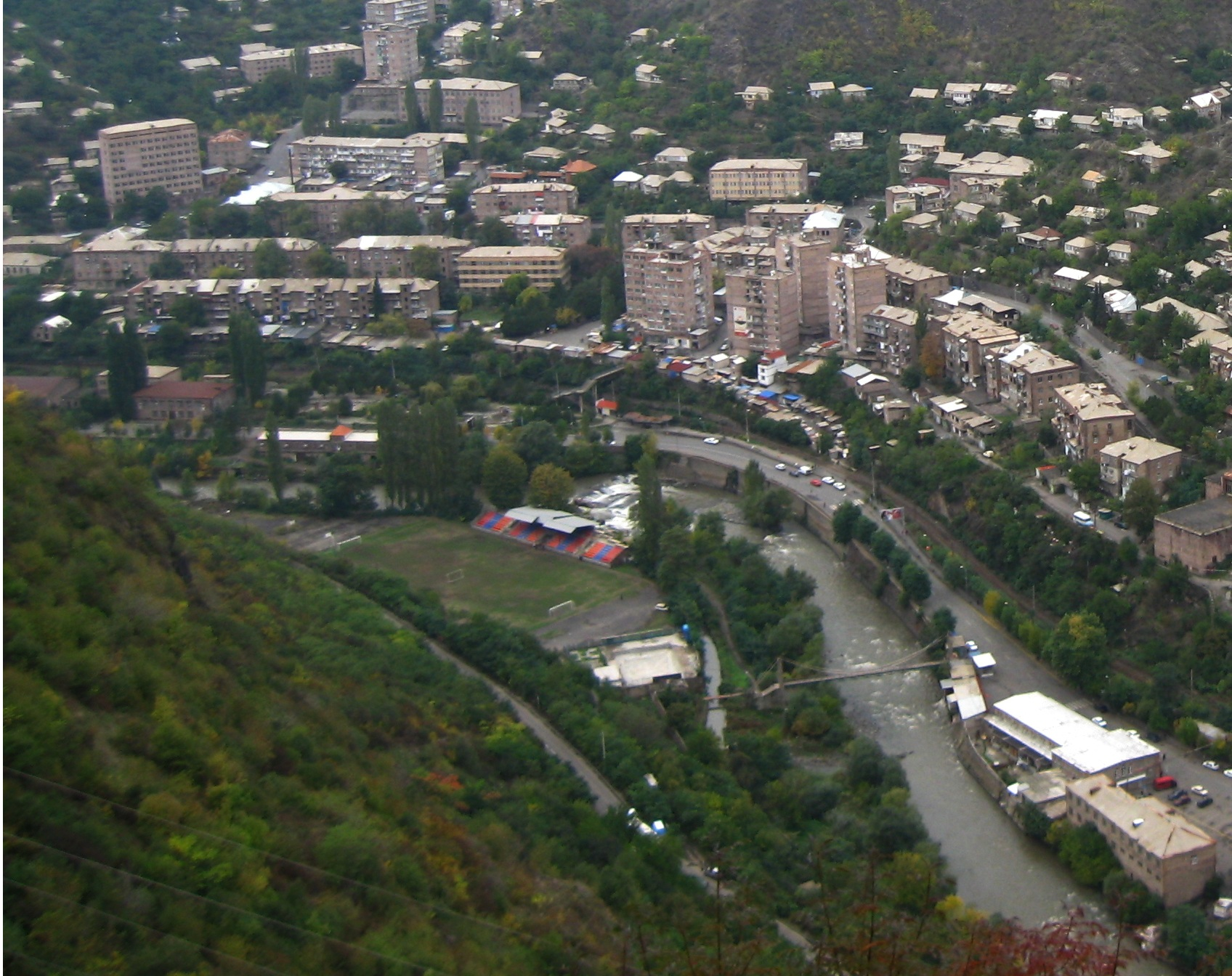
The location of Metallurg Stadium near the Debed River

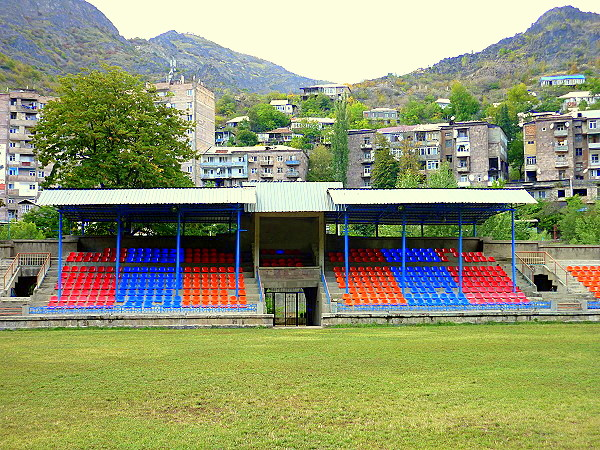
The main stand
