= Alaverdi Futsal =

- Founded: 2015; 10 years ago
- Ground: Oleg Gorbunov Sports School, Alaverdi
- President: Manvel Avagyan
- Head Coach: Arkadi Hanisyan
- League: Armenian Futsal Premier League
- 2017–2018: Premier League, 7th
Home colours	Away colours

Alaverdi Futsal (Armenian: Ալավերդի), was an Armenian professional futsal club based in the town of Alaverdi, Lori Province.

== History ==
Alaverdi Futsal club was founded in 2015 with the assistance of Alaverdi City Council, as well as the member of Parliament Eduard Sharmazanov who is a native of Alaverdi. The club participated in the 2015–16 season of the Armenian Futsal Premier League, occupying the 6th place among 7 participants in their inaugural season. They played their home games at the Oleg Gorbunov Sports School of Alaverdi. They appear to have folded before the 2018–2019 season as they do not appear in the league statistics for that season and the last YouTube video posted of them playing is from April 2018.

== Season by season ==
Season	Tier	Division	Pos.
2015–2016	1	Premier League	6th
2016–2017	1	Premier League	7th
2017–2018	1	Premier League	7th
