= Sh.S.U. Futsal =

- Short name: Sh.S.U. Futsal
- Founded: 2017; 8 years ago
- Ground: Aram Sargsyan Sports Hall, Gyumri
- Capacity: 350
- President: (Armenia) Sahak Minasyan
- Head Coach: (Armenia) Hovhannes Ayvazyan
- League: Armenian Futsal Premier League
- 2017–18: Premier League, 8th
Home colours	Away colours

Shirak State University Futsal Club, shortly known as Sh.S.U. Futsal, is an Armenian professional futsal club based in Gyumri, representing the Shirak State University named after Mikael Nalbandian.

== History ==
Shirak State University Futsal Club was formed in 2017 by the initiation of the Shirak University rector Dr. Sahak Minasyan, and through the efforts of the university students, alumni and a group of professional futsal players from Shirak Province. The team currently plays at the Armenian Futsal Premier League, using the Aram Sargsyan Sports Hall of Gyumri as their home ground. During their inaugural 2017-18 season, the team occupied the 8th position among 8 teams.

== Season by season ==
Season	Tier	Division	Pos.
2017–18	1	Premier League	8th
