= Sanahin =

Sanahin Սանահին
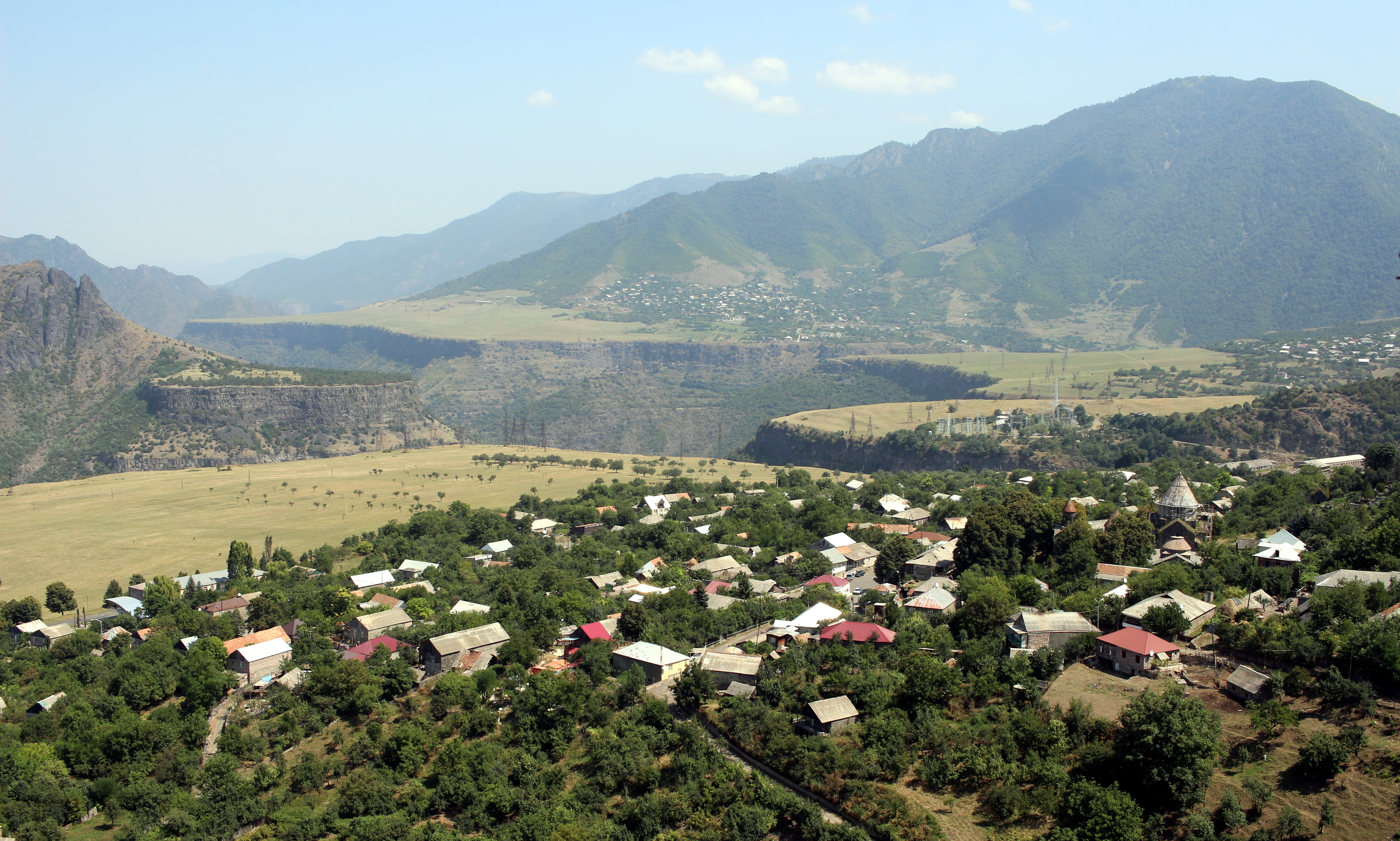

- Location within Armenia
- Coordinates: 41°05′17″N 44°40′00″E
- Country: Armenia
- Province: Lori
- Elevation: 1,016 m (3,333 ft)
- Time zone: UTC+4 (AMT)

Sanahin (Armenian: Սանահին) is a district of the city of Alaverdi in the northern province of Lori in Armenia. Once a separate village, it is the location of the Sanahin Monastery complex, founded in the 10th century and listed as a UNESCO World Heritage Site, along with the nearby Haghpat Monastery.

== Notable people ==
Sanahin was the birthplace of the brothers Anastas and Artem Mikoyan. Artem was a famous aircraft designer, and co-founder of the Mikoyan-Gurevich (MiG) design bureau along with Mikhail Gurevich. Anastas was a Soviet statesman and long-serving Politburo member, known for his roles in the Soviet food industry, de-Stalinization, and international diplomacy, especially during the Cuban Missile Crisis. In addition to Sanahin Monastery, many visitors also stop at the nearby Mikoyan Brothers Museum, run by relatives of the Mikoyan family.
