= Ackner =

Ackner is a surname. Notable people with the surname include:

- Johann Michael Ackner (1782–1862), Transylvanian archaeologist and nature researcher
- Desmond Ackner, Baron Ackner (1920–2006), British judge and Lord of Appeal in Ordinary
