= Akner, Lori =

Akner Ակներ
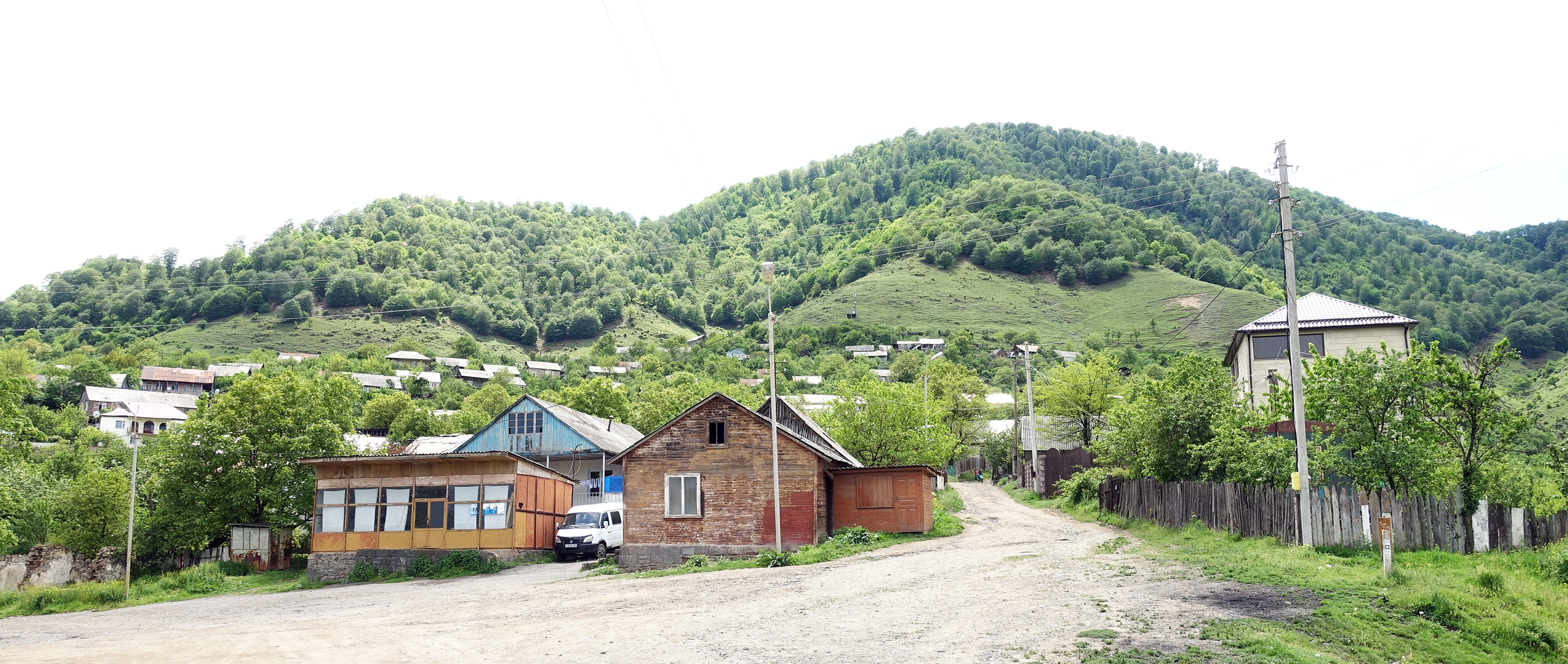

- Location within Armenia
- Coordinates: 41°04′59″N 44°41′24″E
- Country: Armenia
- Province: Lori
- Elevation: 1,050 m (3,440 ft)

Population (2011)
  - Total: 512
- Time zone: UTC+4 (AMT)

Akner (Armenian: Ակներ), is a village that belongs to the municipal community of Alaverdi, in the Lori Province of Armenia.

== Population ==
Year	1886	1914	1922	1939	1959	1970	2001
Population	290	501	475	765	644	302	655

== Gallery ==
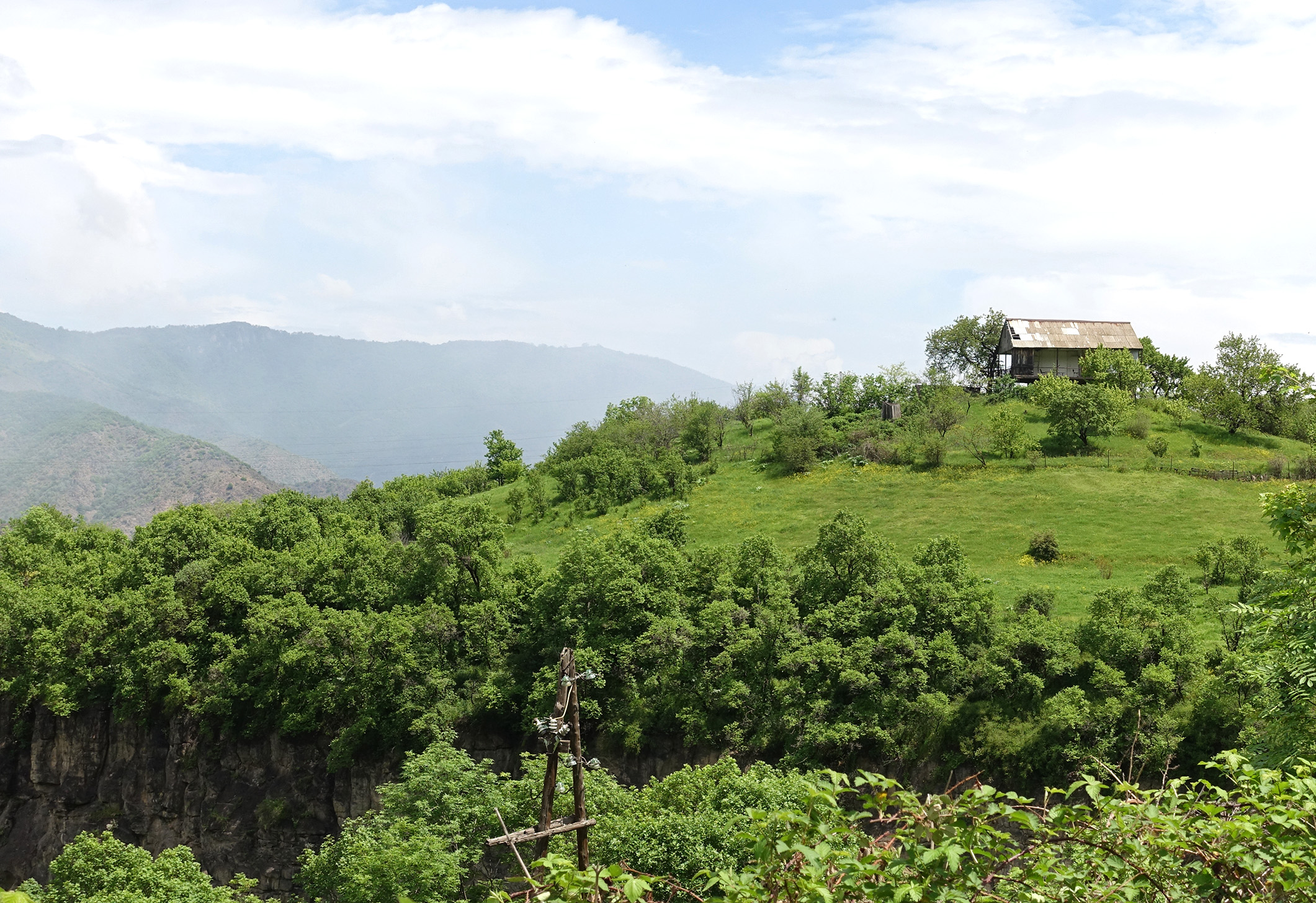

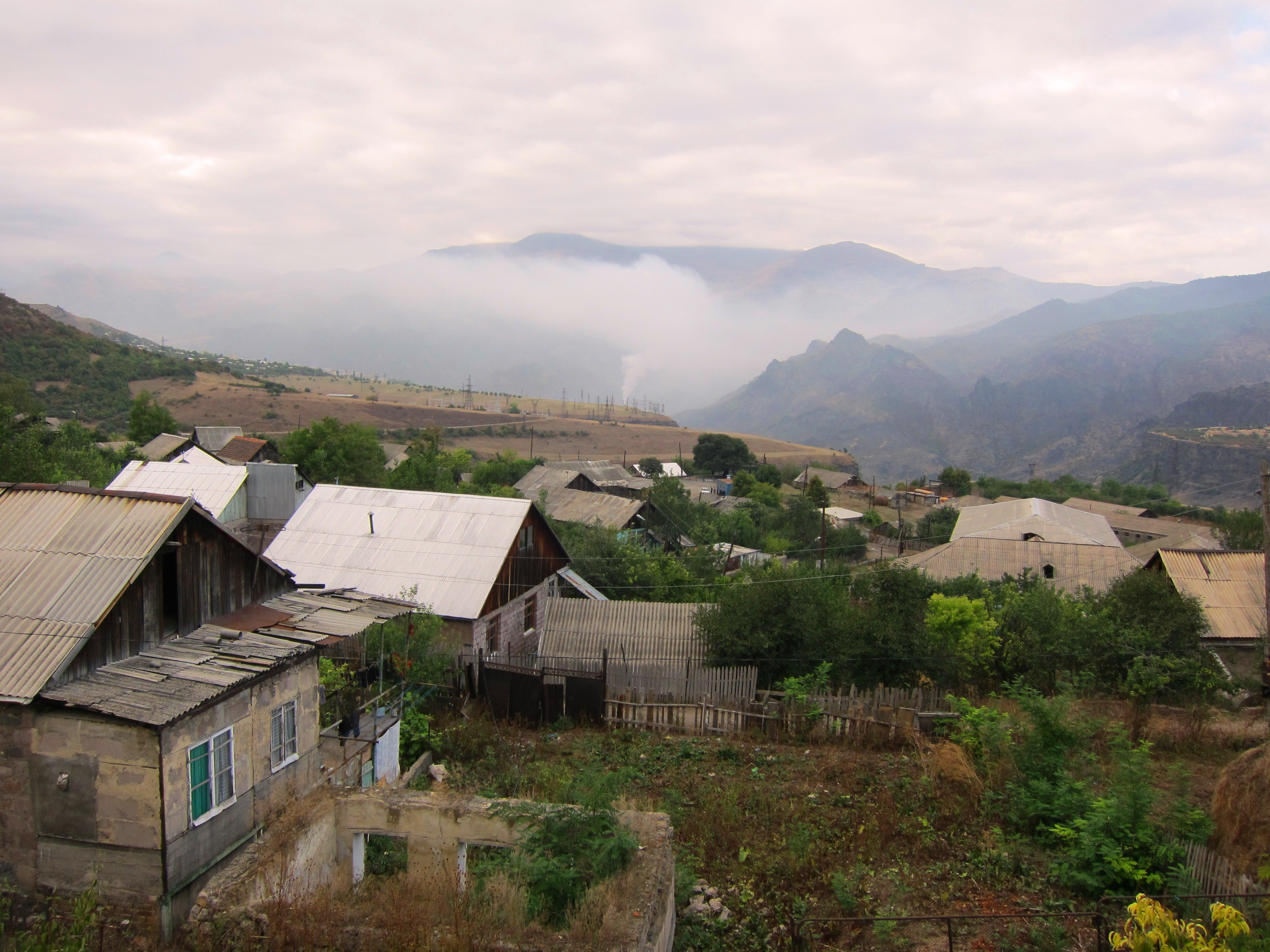

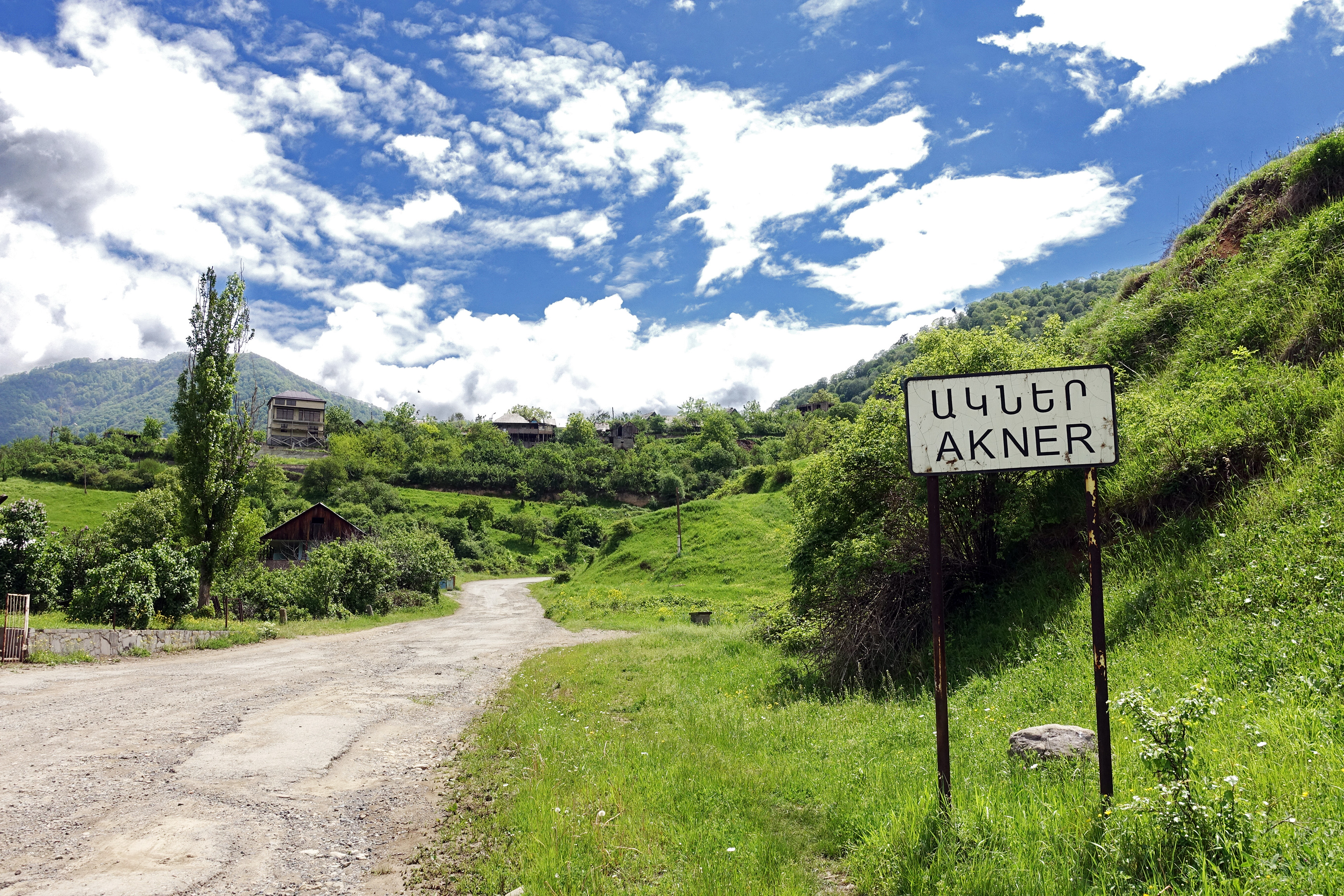

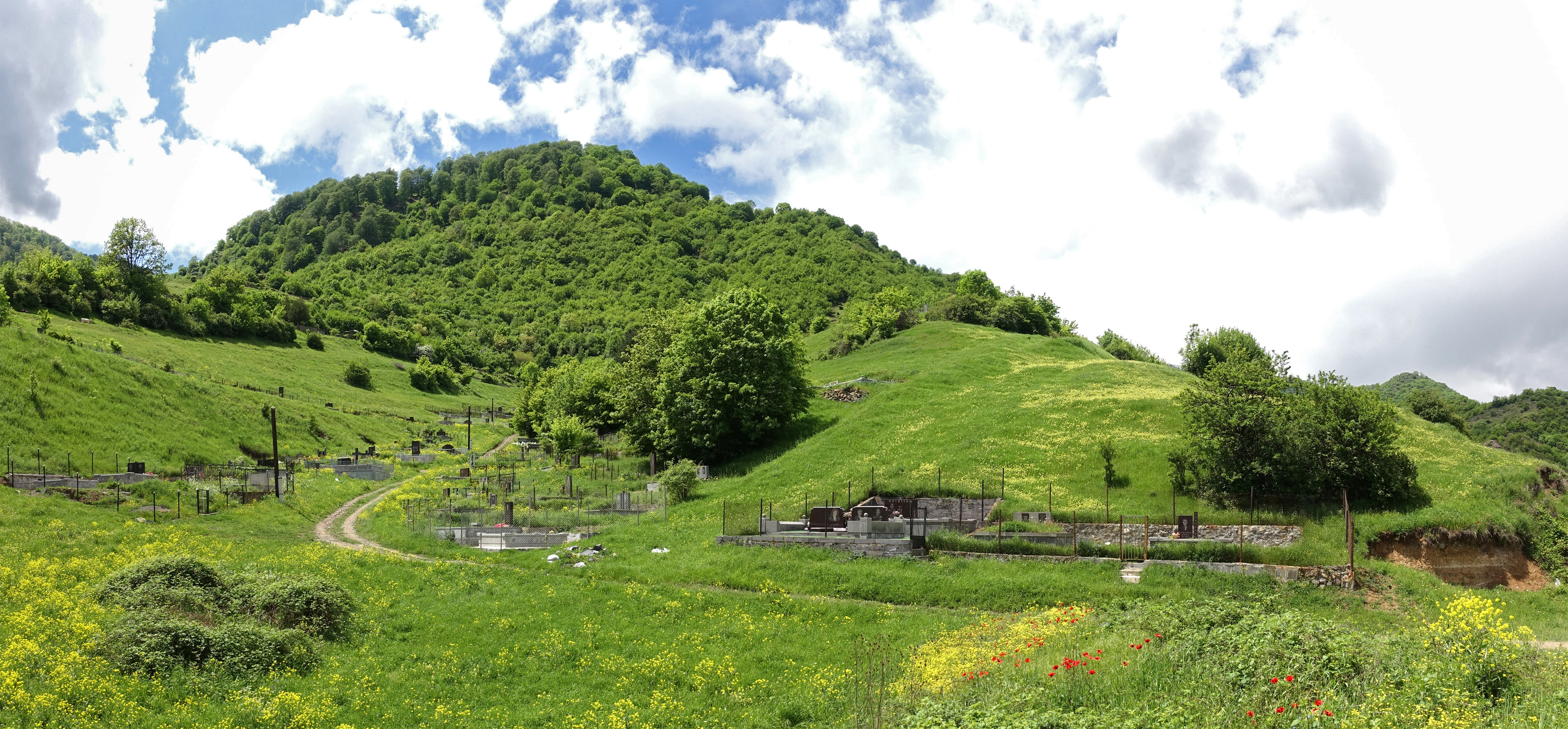

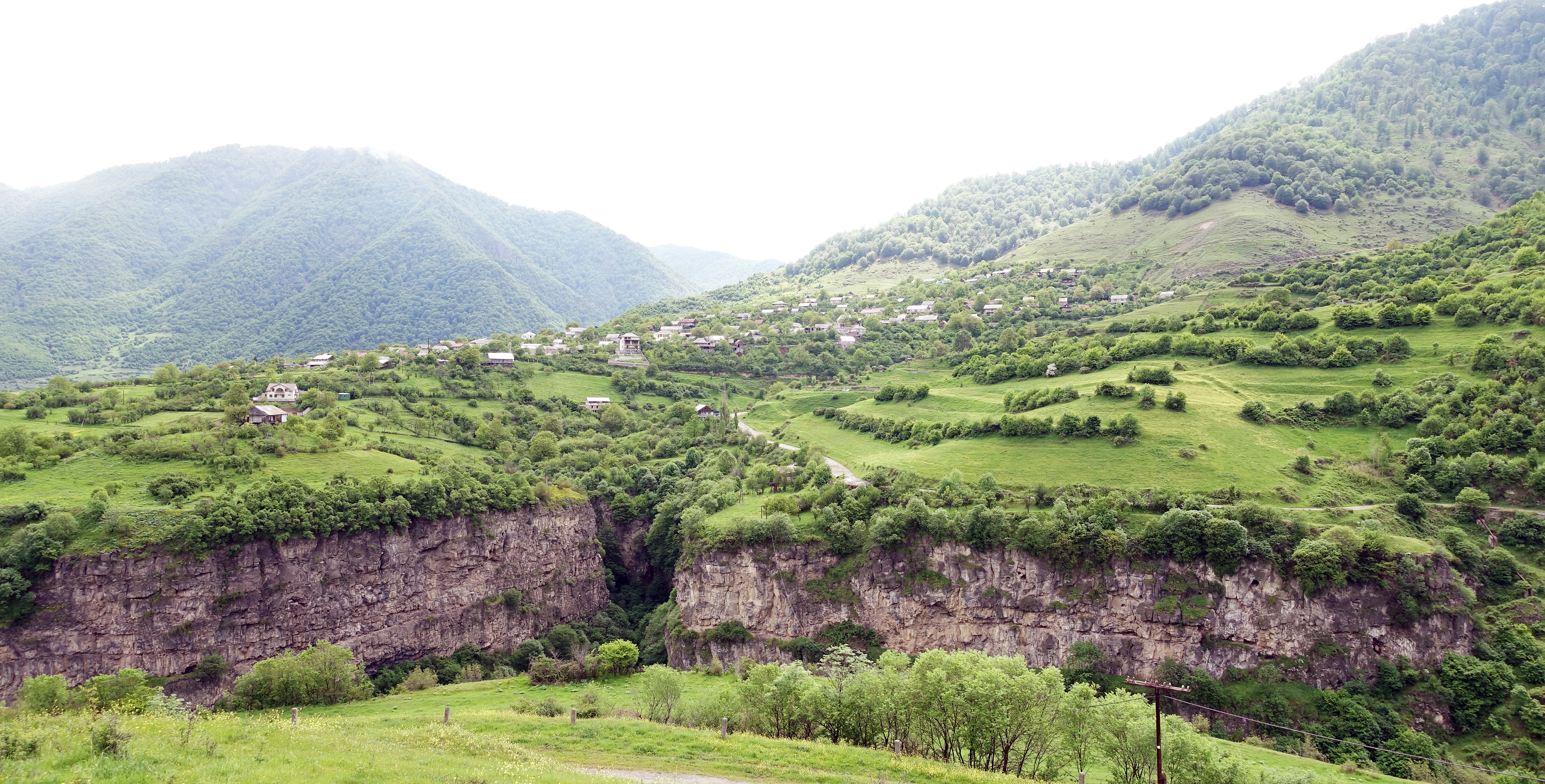
