= Akori, Armenia =

Akori Աքորի
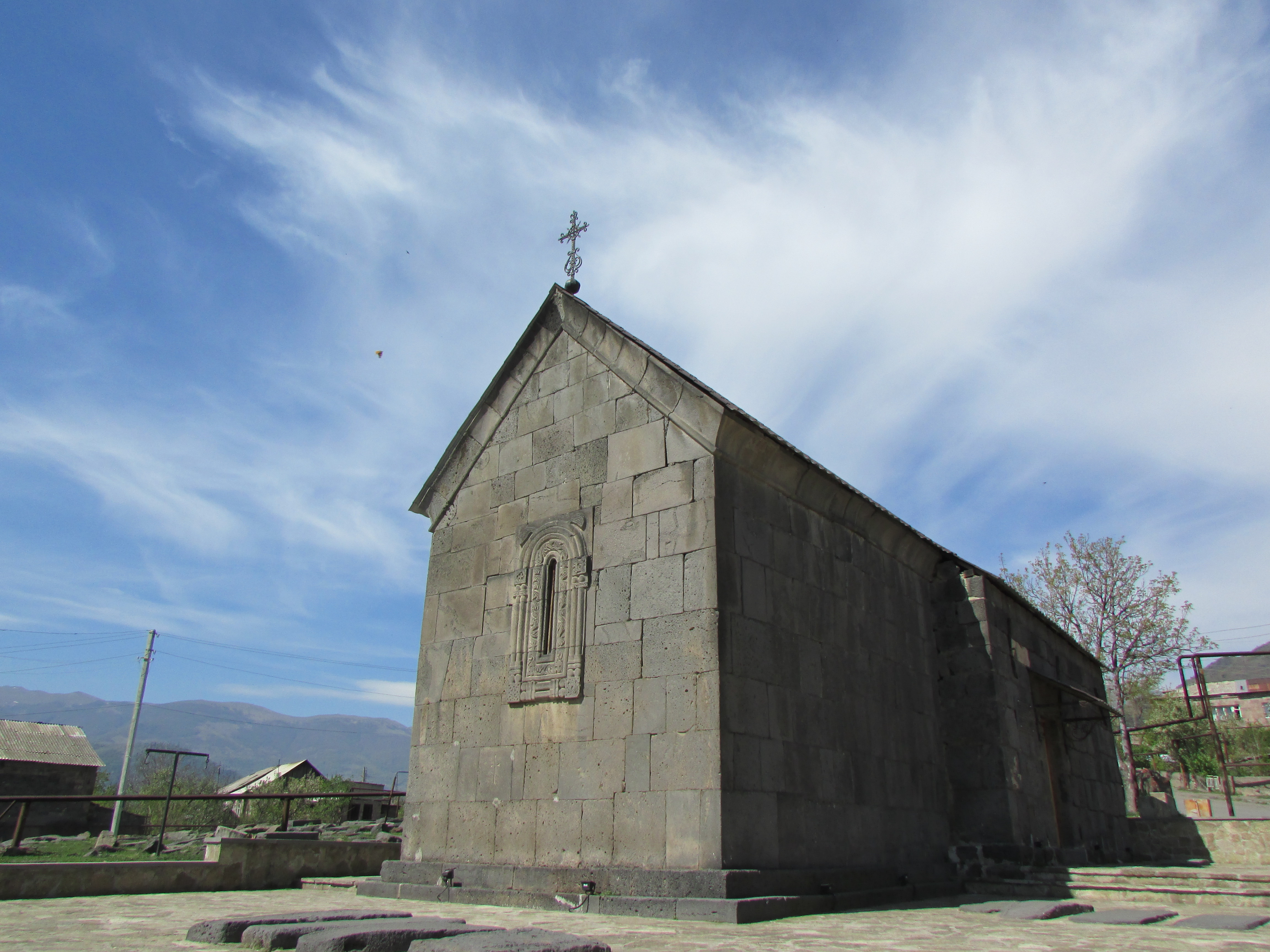

- Location within Armenia
- Coordinates: 41°05′32″N 44°36′58″E
- Country: Armenia
- Province: Lori

Area
  - Total: 24.8 km^{2} (9.6 sq mi)
- Elevation: 1,400 m (4,600 ft)

Population (2011)
  - Total: 2,065
- Time zone: UTC+4 (AMT)

Akori (Armenian: Աքորի) is a village in the Lori Province of Armenia.

== Development programs ==
Starting in 2006 Children of Armenia Fund started working in Akori to advance rural life in the village. The programs implemented include professional orientation, English teaching Access Program, school principals' workshop, healthecare supervision, Public health screenings, eye care and oral hygiene trainings, art clubs. Children of Armenia Fund also renovated village facilities such as SMART Room, Sunny room child Development corner. Before COAF SMART Center opening there were already SMART rooms in the villages. These education rooms have all the equipment and internet connection to provide local people with new possibilities. It helps connect communities with each other and the world. SMART rooms provide education in self-development, medicine, social services, computer literacy, media literacy. These rooms enable people to learn also during winter months, when travelling in Lori region is difficult. SMART rooms are accessible not only for rural youth, but also neighboring students and community members.

== Gallery ==
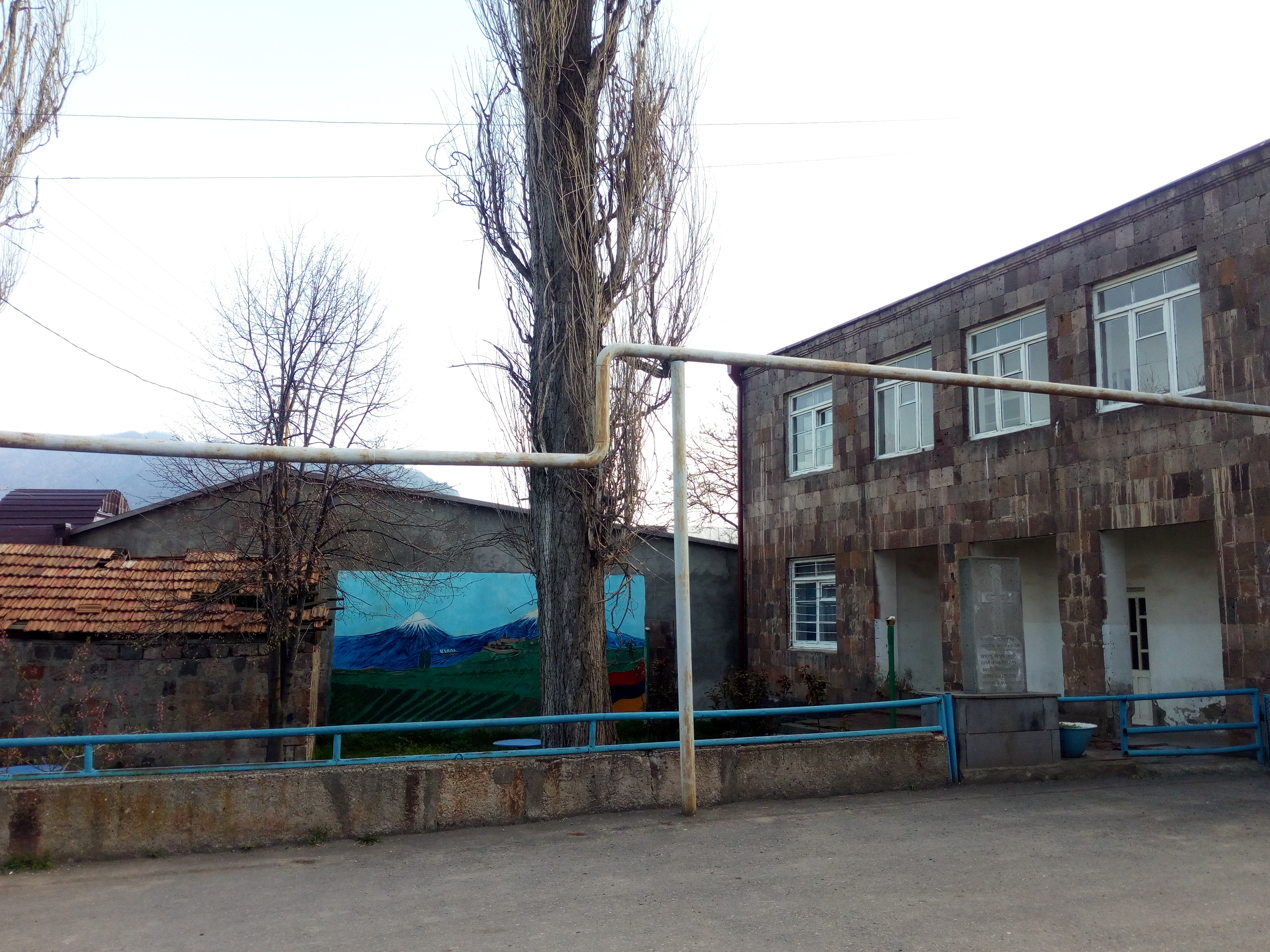

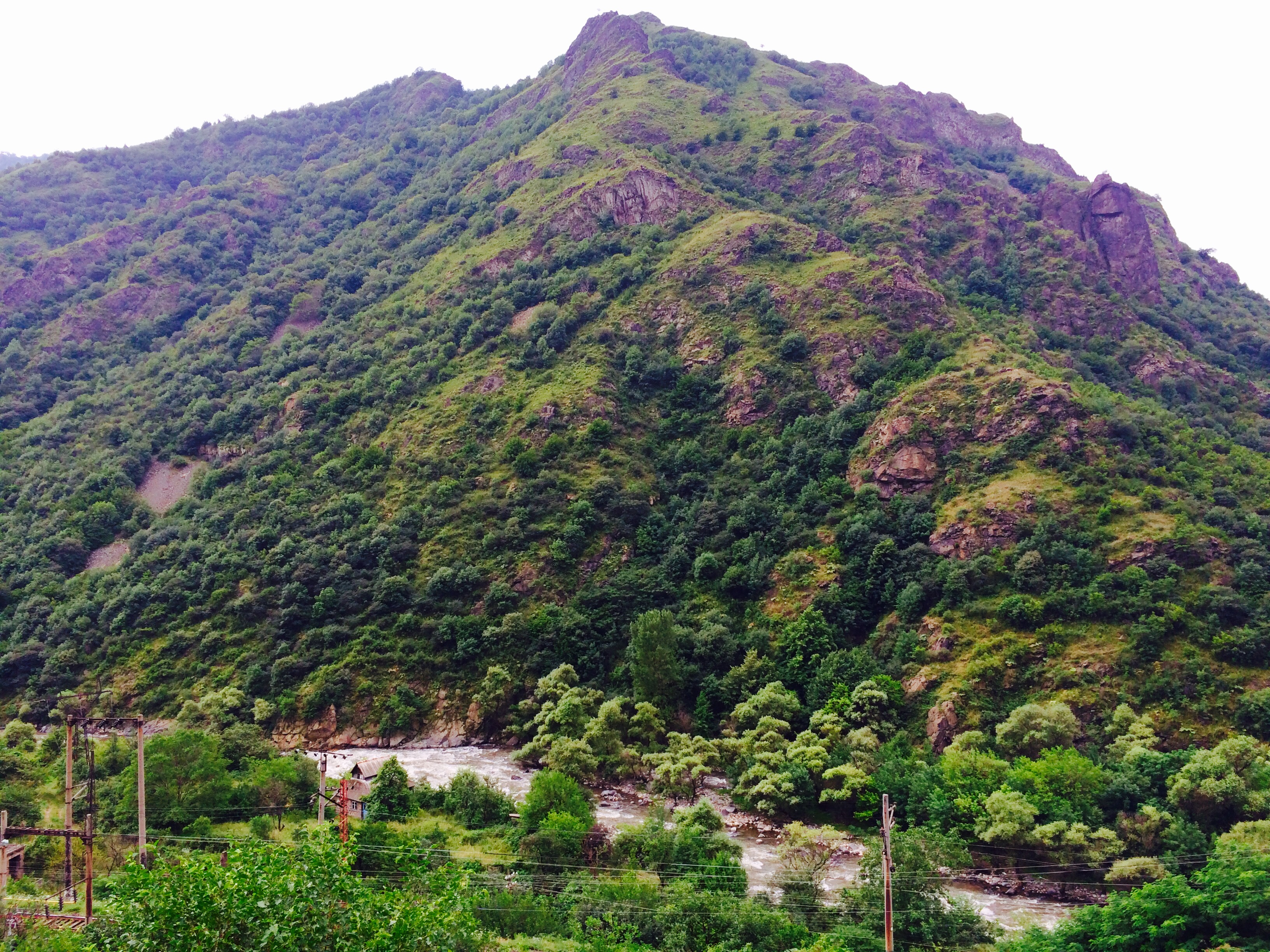

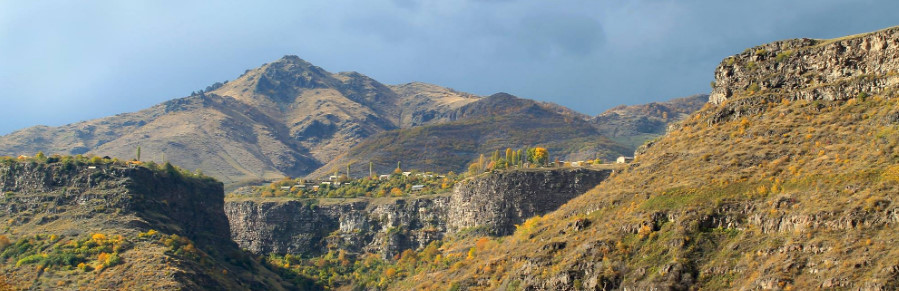

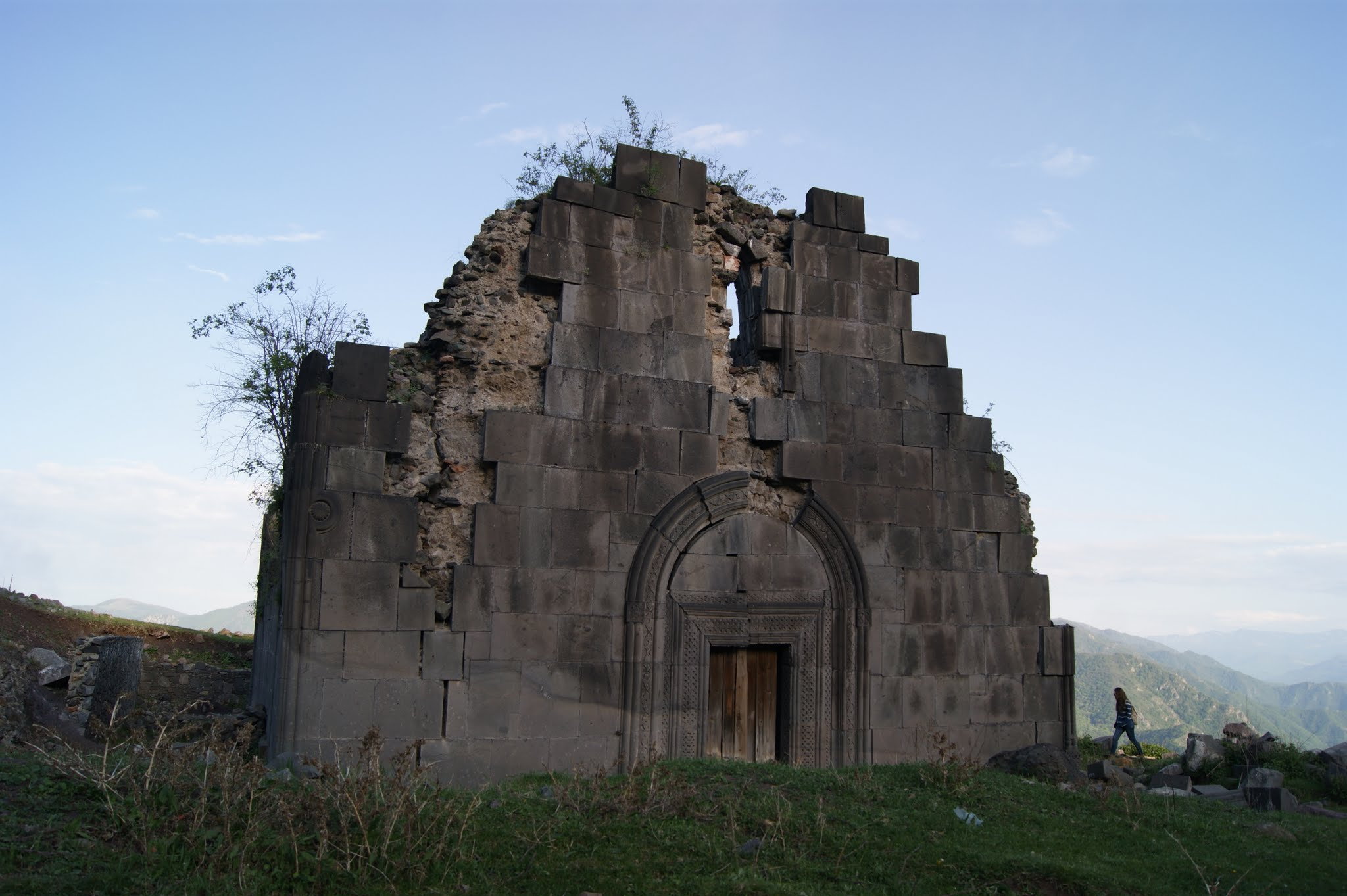
