= Lori (historic province) =

Historical region of Armenia

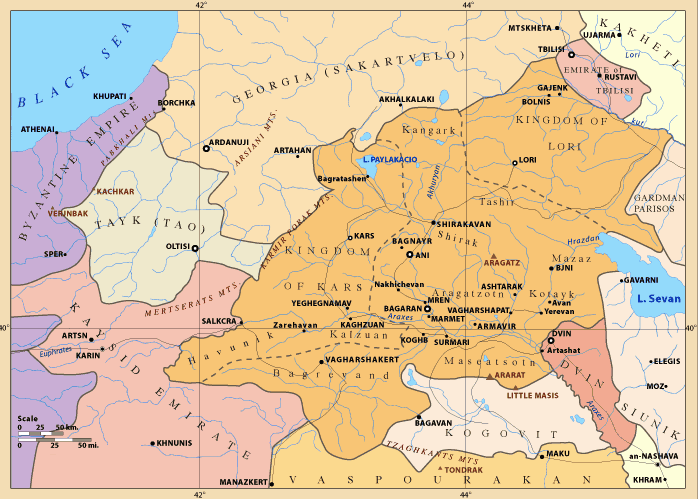
The Kingdom of Lori and Lori Fortress in the northeast of Bagratid Armenia

Lori (Armenian: Լոռի) is a historical geographical region of Armenia. In ancient times and the Middle Ages, it was also known as Tashir or Tashirk. After the construction of Lori Fortress by King David I Anhoghin in the 11th century, the region was also referred to as Lori.

== Name ==
In ancient times, the region of Lori was known in Armenian as Tashir or Tashirk’ (ტაშირი, Tashiri in Georgian). Pliny refers to the region as Thasie (Robert Hewsen suggests the reading *Thasira). In the Middle Ages, Georgians also called the place Somkhiti, i.e., Armenia, along with the other nearest regions. The central part of the region was also referred to as Tashiratap’, meaning 'Tashir plain' in Old Armenian (currently Lori Plateau). Until the 7th century, its center was Odzun; later, Lori (Lore) or Loriberd became the central town. It was in the 11th century that the region began to be called Lori after its principal settlement.

== Geography ==
Lori was located in between the Javakheti (to the west), Virahayots (to the north), Bazum (to the south), and Gugark (to the east) mountain ranges, which are parts of the Lesser Caucasus. It corresponded to the historical district of Tashir and the former Kalinino, Stepanavan and Tumanyan districts of Armenia (the northern part of modern-day Lori Province). Lori encompassed the Lori Plateau and the basin of the Debed River.

== History ==
=== Ancient Times ===
In the historical memory of the Armenians, all the regions in the province of Gugark (including Tashir) were governed by the descendants of Gushar, the offspring of Hayk, the legendary patriarch of the Armenian nation.

According to Cyril Toumanoff, the region of Tashir was seized from Armenia in the wake of the Pharnavazids' expansion. That opinion was shared by Robert H. Hewsen. After coming into possession of the Armenian regions of Tashir, as well as Ashotsi, the Pharnavazids united them into the Duchy of Samshwild. In the 2nd century B.C., the re-established Armenian monarchy returned Tashir to Armenia. The Artaxiad dynasty, in turn, created a separate administrative unit including Tashir.

In the first half of the 1st century (the period of the fall of the statehood), Iberia established control over Tashir. At the close of the same century, however, the re-established Armenian statehood (ruled by the Artaxiads) managed to return the region. After the division of Armenia in 387, Tashir (the upper parts excluded) passed under Iberia's control. The princes of Tashir represented those dynasties of Armenia which existed both under the Artaxiads and in the later epochs. Ghazar Parpetsi and Elishe refer to the princes of Tashir as participants of the rebellion against the Sassanids between 450 and 451 (formerly part of Gugark Bdeshxhood). By the mid-5th century, Tashir became a separate kingdom. By the end of the 7th century, it restored the one-time bdeshxhood borders.

=== Middle Ages ===
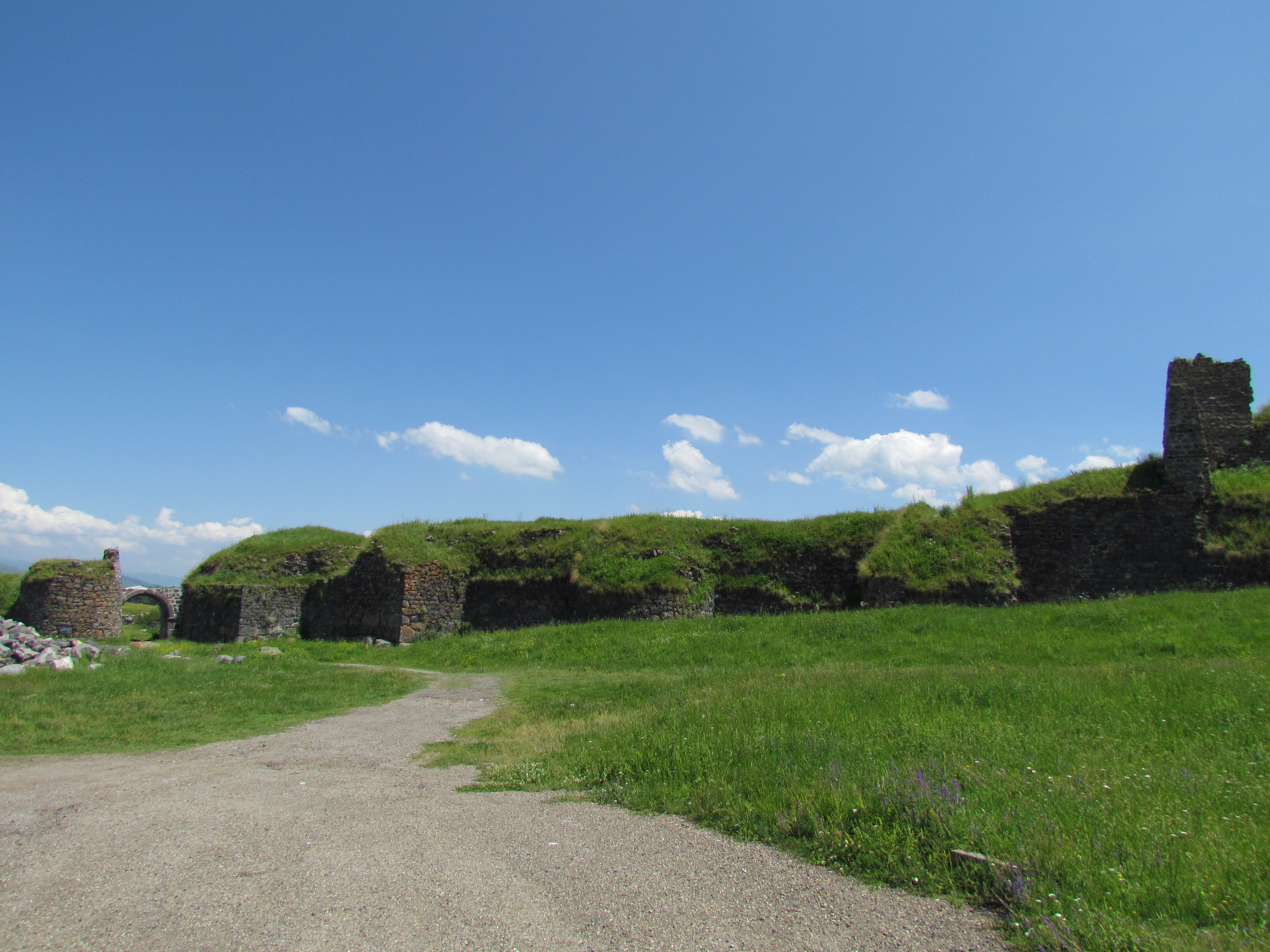
Lori Fortress, founded by the Armenian King David I Anhoghin in the first half of the 11th century.

In the 9th century, Prince Guaram conquered Tashir. Available records reveal that neither his father, Ashot, nor grandfather, exercised control over the region. Until 876, Guaram handed over the adjacent region of Ashotsk to his son-in-law Ashot, the future king of Armenia. It was apparently in that period that Tashir was handed over as the name never occurs among the lands under the Bagratids' possession. However, it was later referred to as a land controlled by their Armenian kinsmen.

In about 908 A.D., King Ashot III's son, Kurike, gained control over northern Tashir, which had a formed state in vassal dependence upon Ani. Lori, otherwise known as Tashir-Dzoraget, reached its heyday under David I Anhoghin. Alp Arslan's invasion in 1064 had its reflection also on that state's historic future. King Kurike II of Lori was forced to recognize the sovereignty of Alp Arslan. At the time, King Bagrat IV of Georgia seized Samshvilde from Kurike II, and the latter had to move the capital to the south, i.e. the fort city of Lori founded earlier by his father. In 1105, Lori was invaded by Emir Kyzyl. The Kingdom of Lori finally fell in 1113. The Kingdom of Lori was one of the last remnants of Armenian statehood after the Seljuk invasion of the country in the 11th century.

In the period between 1110 and 1123, King David the Builder united several Armenian lands – including Lori – to Georgia. A Georgian chronicler left records about David's invasions: "... The same year he conquered the Armenian fortress of Lore". According to Vardan the Great, the latter united "Gag, Terunakat, Tavush, Kayan, Kaytson, Lore, Tashchir and Makhanaberd, subjecting all the Armenian possessions to his rule". Afterwards, the Georgian king also held the title of the King of Armenians. Lori was soon handed over to the Orbelian dynasty. Shortly after the suppression of the Orbeli uprising (1177), King George III handed over Lori to the Khubasar, the Kipchak ruler. Eight years later, however, Queen Tamar handed over the region to Sargis Mkhragrdzeli-Zavaryan, the new amirspasalar (commander-in-chief) of Georgia. According to Cyril Toumanoff, Lori was ruled by the Kingdom of Zakaryans (Mkhragrdzeli) between the 12th and 13th centuries. North-Eastern Armenia, which was under Georgian reign, was ruled by Amirspasalar Zakare and his son, Shahinshah, in the 13th century. The entire north of Armenia was liberated from the Seljuks, with the reign extending to vaster areas. Also in the same period, the small region of Dsegh appeared briefly under Mamikonian rule. From 1236 until 1237, Lori, along with other major cities of Armenia, was captured by the Mongols. Ahead of the Mongol conquest, it was one of the main centers of crafts and trade in Northern Armenia. The fortified city fell under the rule of Qarachar Noyan. In the late 14th century, Lori was destroyed by Tamerlan. Lori was among those regions of historic Armenia that suffered the most severe consequences of the Timur invasion as part of the Georgian Kingdom. In 1435, Georgian King Alexander I handed over the region to the Orbelian dynasty. Between 1474 and 1477, traveler Ambrogio Contarini wrote the following record about Lori:

/Loreo/ On the 22nd day, we started climbing up the very high mountain and reached its peak by the evening. We stopped there for a rest without even having a drop of water. In the early morning hours of the next day, we moved on and, going off the mountain, found ourselves on the lands under Uzun Hasan's possession (located on a small valley between a mountain and a river), remarkable not so much for the depth of its waters but rather for the steepness and height of its shorelines. There's an Armenian village built by the river, where we stopped for the night.

=== Modern and contemporary times ===
From the 16th until the 17th centuries, the mountainous regions of Lori were ruled by Armenian melik-feudals. Thus, in the 16th century, the ruler of Lori was Melik-Nazar who, in 1602, received a royal edict from King Abbas the Great of Persia, affirming his long-time rights to rule over the region.

After the 1555 Peace of Amasya, Lori passed under the Safavids' control, administratively being integrated into the Kingdom of Kartli-Kakheti. When Abbas the Great displaced an estimated 250,000 people from Eastern Armenia during the 1604 "Great Sürgün", the population of Lori was also deported. A contemporary of the events, Arakel of Tabriz, left the following record in the mid-17th century:

... he turned Armenia into an uninhabited [desert]. For upon resettlement, he exiled to Persia [residents] of not just a few but a vast number of Gavars, starting from the borders of Nakhivivan and reaching the Geghama coasts, the gavars of Lori, Hamzachiman and Aparan through Yeghegnadzor ...

After 1747, Kakheti, as well as Kartli, seceded from Iran. From 1762 onwards, Lori formed part of the Georgian Kingdom united by Heraclius II.

In 1771, traveler Johann Anton Güldenstädt wrote:

The Armenian region of Tashiri is located in Somkhiti, in the upper part of Poladauri Mahaver to the north and north-west of Tbilisi. It borders on the Georgian region of Airumli or Kars in the north and on Bampek in the east. The Persian king, Nader Shah, devastated it overwhelmingly. The vast majority of its population were the Armenians followed by Terekeme Tatars.

In 1801, Lori, along with Georgia, was annexed by Russia. It was made a part of the distantsiya (a type of administrative unit at the time) of Lori-Pambak. In 1840, Lori-Pambak was turned into an uchastok (police prefecture) and soon after made a part of the Alexandropol district of the Erivan Governorate. In 1862, Lori was a part of the Tiflis district. In 1880, it was an uchastok within the Borchaly district of the Tiflis Governorate. After the collapse of the Russian Empire, Lori was among the districts disputed between the newly formed republics of Armenia and Georgia. Armenia and Georgia fought a brief war over the disputed territories in December 1918, and Lori was turned into a neutral zone through British mediation. After the Soviet takeover of both countries, Lori became a part of Soviet Armenia.

== Culture ==
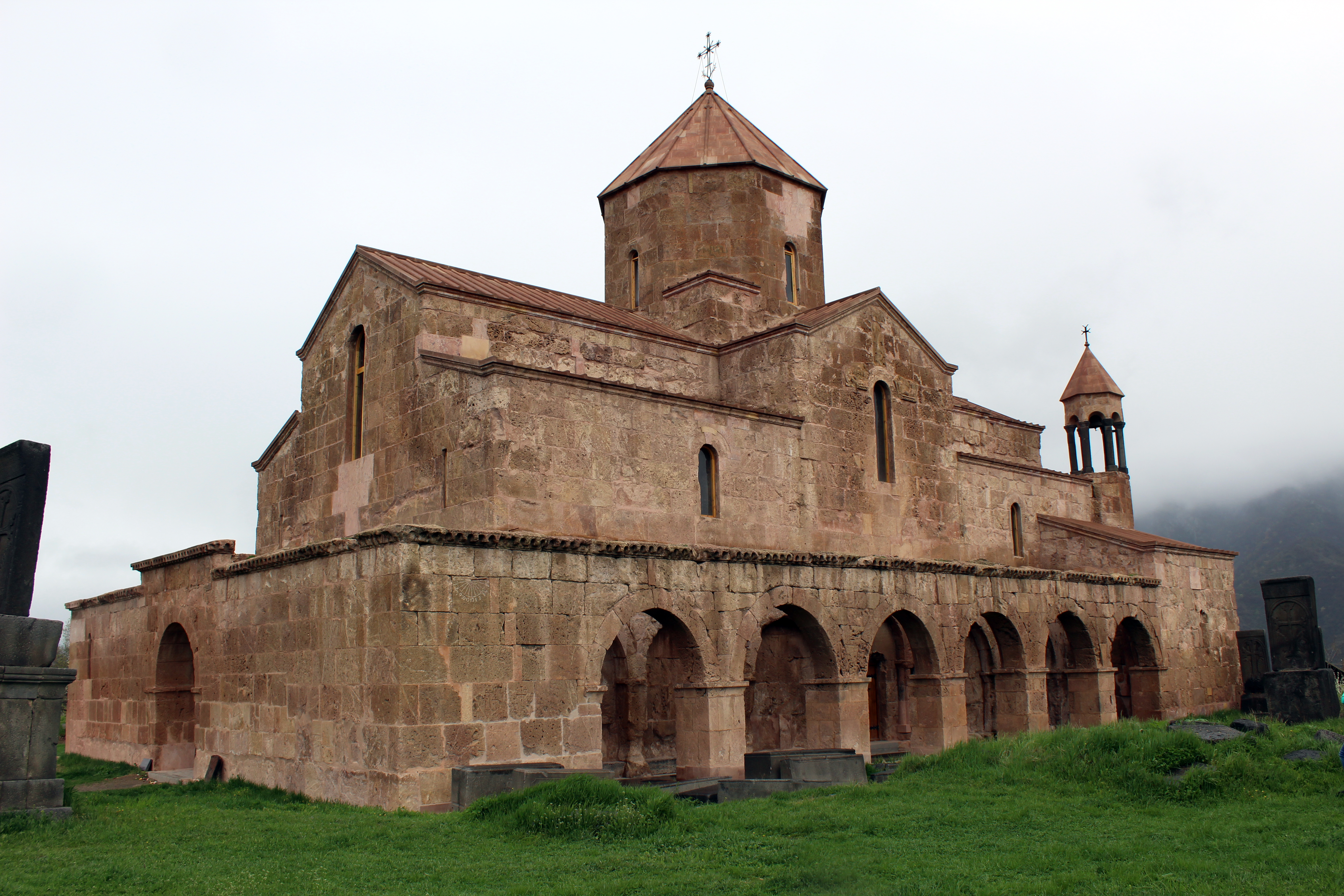
Odzun Church, 5th–7th century

Two mountain vishapakars have been preserved in Lori.

The region was a center of Armenian monastic life. In the early 5th century, Mesrop Mashtots visited Tashir. According to S. Peter Cowe, he sought to spread literacy among the Armenian population in an effort to preserve their authenticity after the region was captured from Armenia.

Among the medieval monasteries, there are such famous landmarks as Odzun, the Holy Mother of God Church of Kurtan, Tormak in Gulagarak, Jrashen in Vardablur and Bardzrakadh in Dsegh. The 6th-century basilica of Odzun is of a special cultural value. In the 10th century, the monasteries of Sanahin and Haghpat, major historical monuments of Armenia, were built in the east of the Tashir-Dzorakert Kingdom. Lori was home to such representatives of the Armenian culture as Hovhannes Sarkavag, Grigor Tuteordi, David Kobayretsi, Anania Sanahentsi, etc.

In the first decades of the 13th century North-Western Armenia (which was under the Zakarian dynasty's rule) saw a period of an economic and cultural boom. The event played a crucial role in the 13th-century history of the Armenian church, solidifying the Chalcedonians' positions while simultaneously approximating the two denominations.

In the early 13th century, a number of monasteries were estranged from the Armenian Apostolic Church to be handed over to the Chalcedonian Armenians. Among them were Pghindzavank (Akhtala), Kobayr, Khuchap, Hnevank, Kirants, Srveh, Sedvivank, Bggavor, etc. According to Aleksey Lidov, the region, which formed part of the Georgian Kingdom in different periods of history, remained the stronghold of the Armenian culture. According to The Cambridge History of Christianity, the Chalcedonian Armenian monasteries of Kobayr, Kirants and Pghndzavank (Akhtala, Lori region) performed the translation of texts unavailable in the Armenian language in the 13th century. Anthony Bryer, David Winfield, Dawit Isaak and Selina Ballance refer to Lori as the Chalcedonian-Armenian region of Georgia in the 13th century.
