= Cathedral of Mren =

Armenian church built in the 7th century

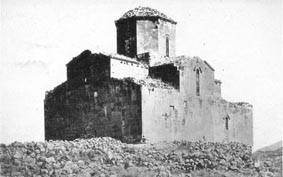
- Mren in the early 20th century

- Location within Turkey

Religion
- Affiliation: Armenian Apostolic Church

Location
- Location: Digor District
- Coordinates: 40.242125°N 43.662953°E

Architecture
- Type: Three-nave basilica with dome
- Style: Armenian
- Groundbreaking: 631
- Completed: 639

The Cathedral of Mren (Armenian: Մրենի տաճար) is a 7th-century Armenian church in an abandoned medieval town site called Mren. It is located in the Kars region of Turkey, near the border with Armenia, about 1.5 km west of the Akhurian River.

== Architecture ==
The Cathedral of Mren is a domed triple-nave basilica, believed, on the basis of an inscription on its west facade and on stylistic features, to have been built 631–639. It was built by David Saharuni, an Armenian ally of the Byzantine emperor Heraclius, to celebrate the latter's entry into Jerusalem in 628. Following construction, the name of the Byzantine Emperor, Emperor Theodosius II was inscribed in the cathedral as well as listing him as "Prince of Armenia and Syria". It also featured the name of the Bishop Theophilus and the Prince of Armenia Nerses Kamsarakan. The cathedral has a number of frescos covering the return of the True Cross to Jerusalem by Emperor Heraclius. It was noted as being a rare example at the time of showing the Emperor in Byzantine art as being dismounted from his horse and wearing plain clothing, a reference to the story that Heraclius tried to carry the cross in on horseback in his robes but it was too heavy but when he removed his crown and dismounted then it became miraculously light. It also contains early examples of mediaeval wall paintings depicting Jesus and the Twelve Apostles. Following the decline of the Byzantine Empire, the cathedral came under Muslim control for two centuries. When Christian rule was returned to the area in the 10th-11th century, the cathedral was reconsecrated.

It is the largest surviving domed basilica from seventh century Armenian architecture. Over the years, it had eventually become abandoned due to its remote location and due to it being located near the Armenia–Turkey border which had been closed, requiring official Turkish government permission to visit the site, which was rarely given. In 2008, the south wall collapsed, leaving the cathedral's structure unstable. In 2014, the World Monuments Fund surveyed the site with the Turkish Ministry of Culture in order to protect it.

== Gallery ==
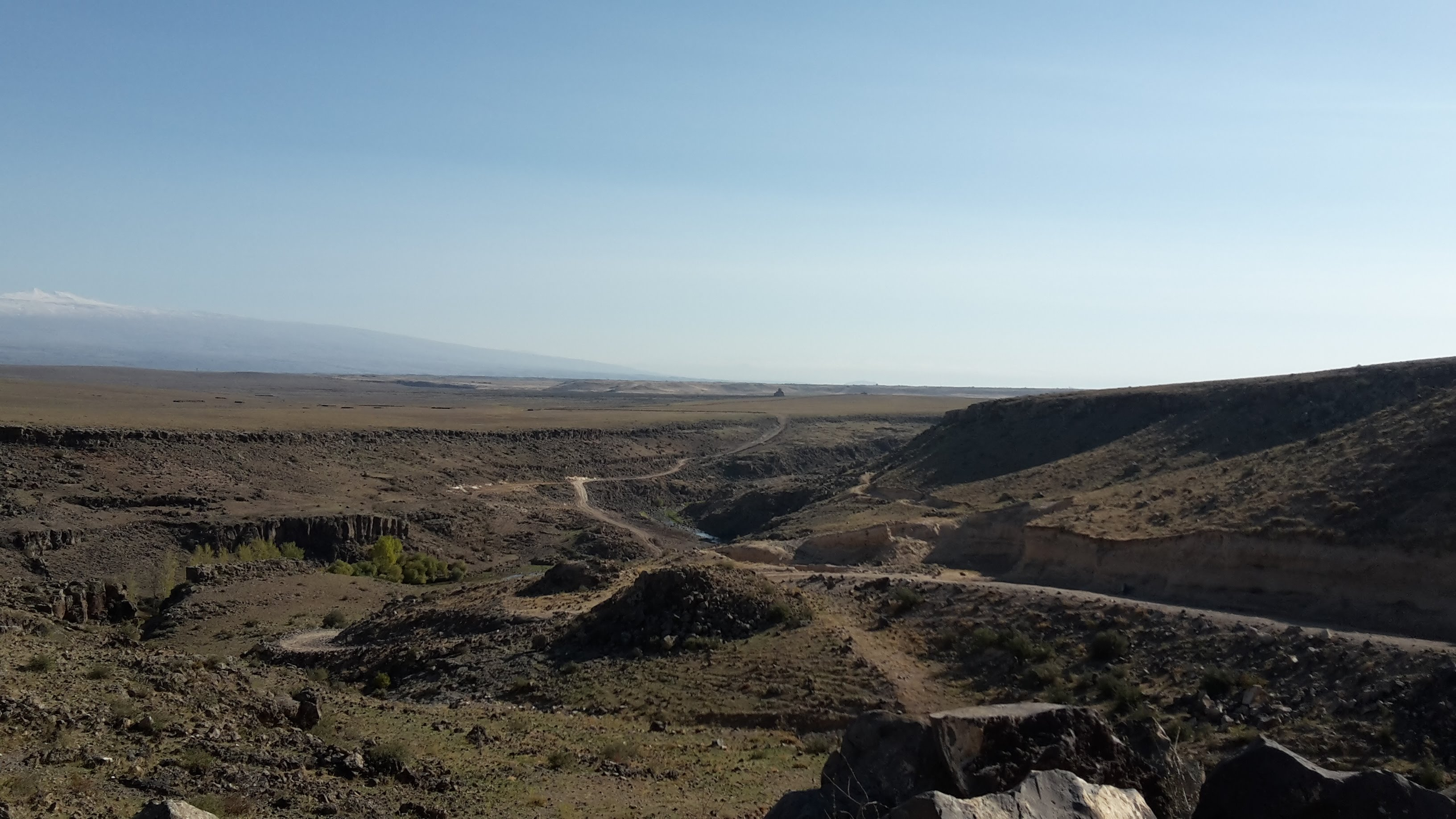
Path leading from village Karabağ to city of Mren

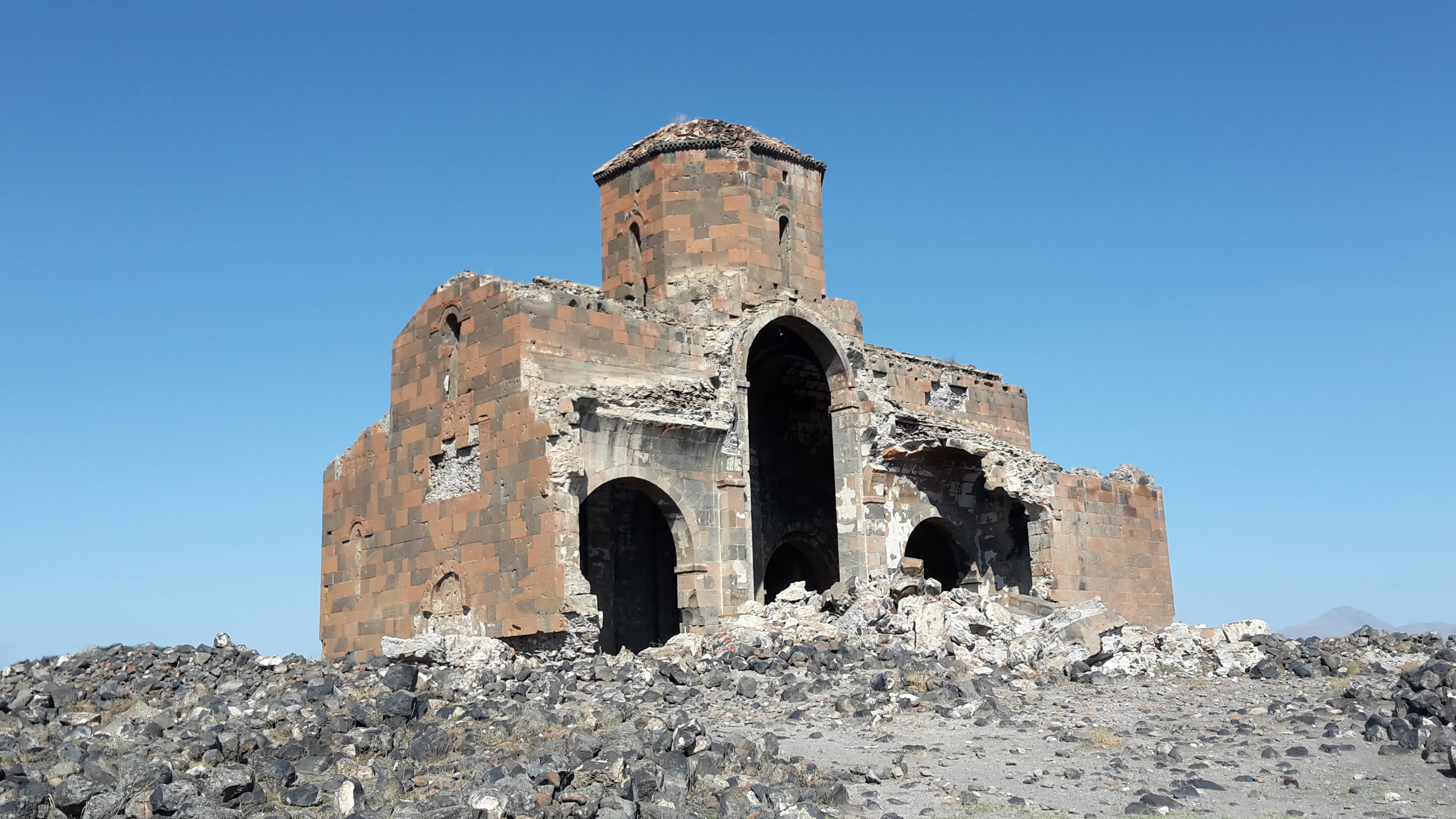
Collapsed side aisle

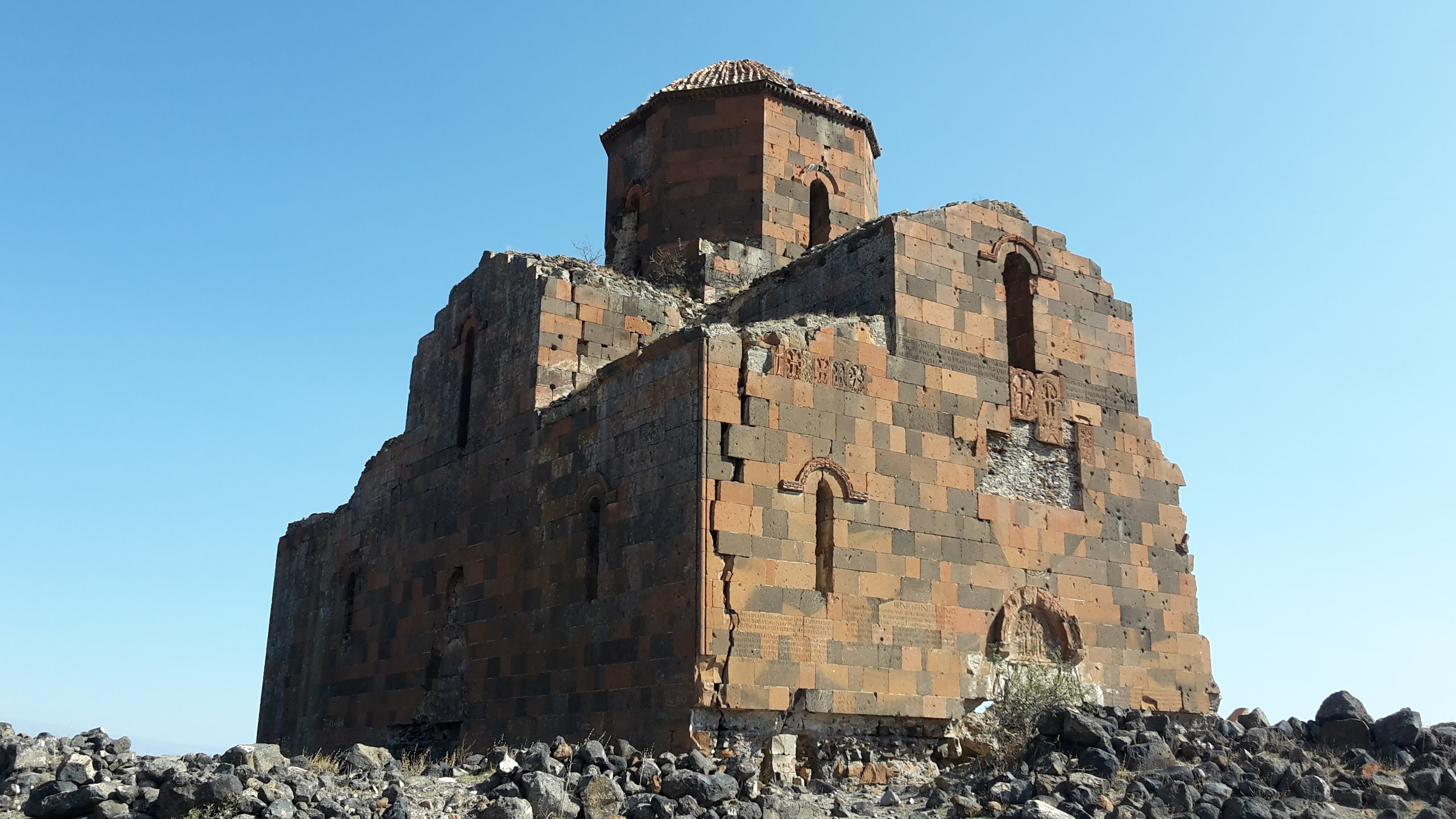

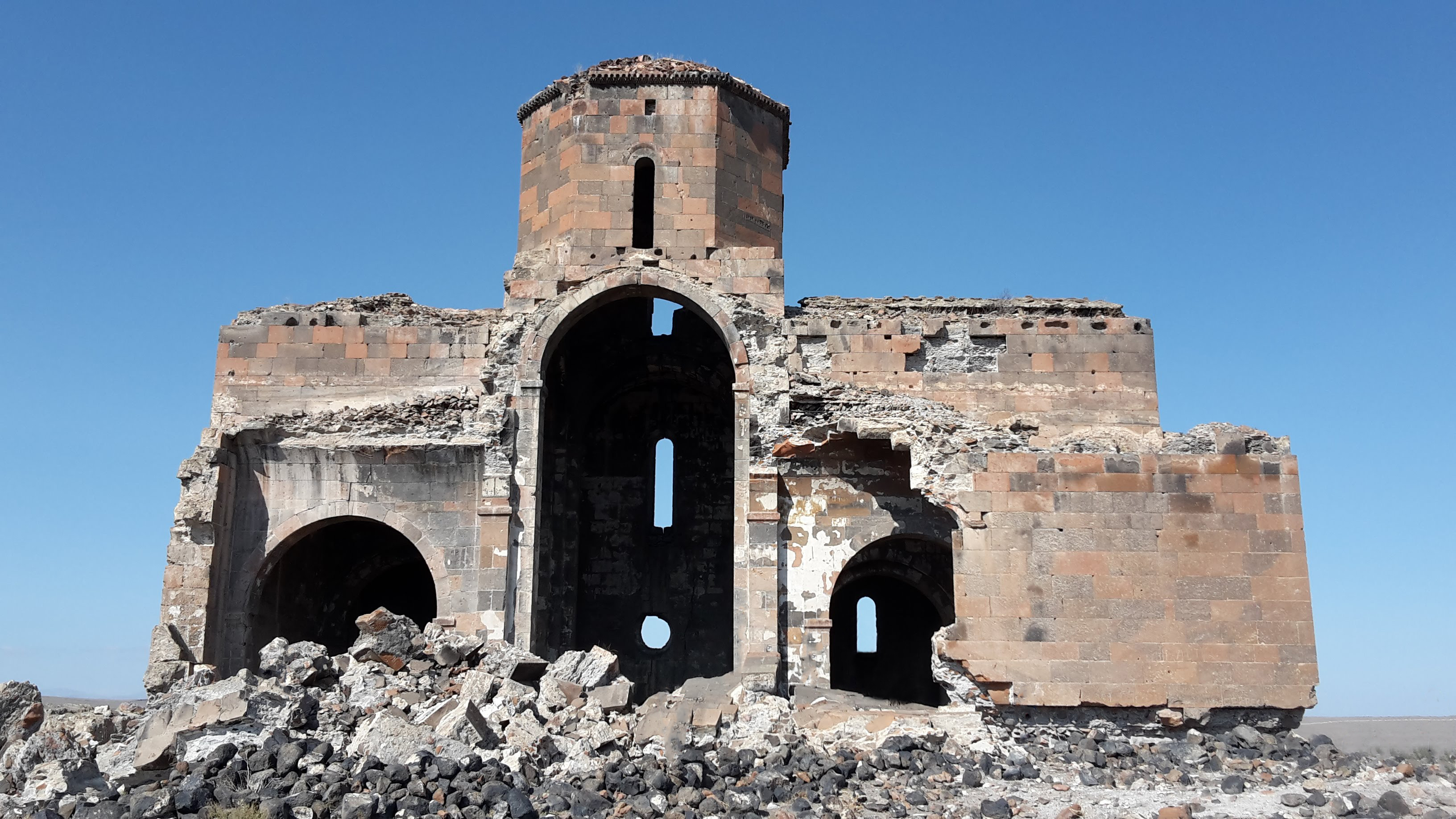

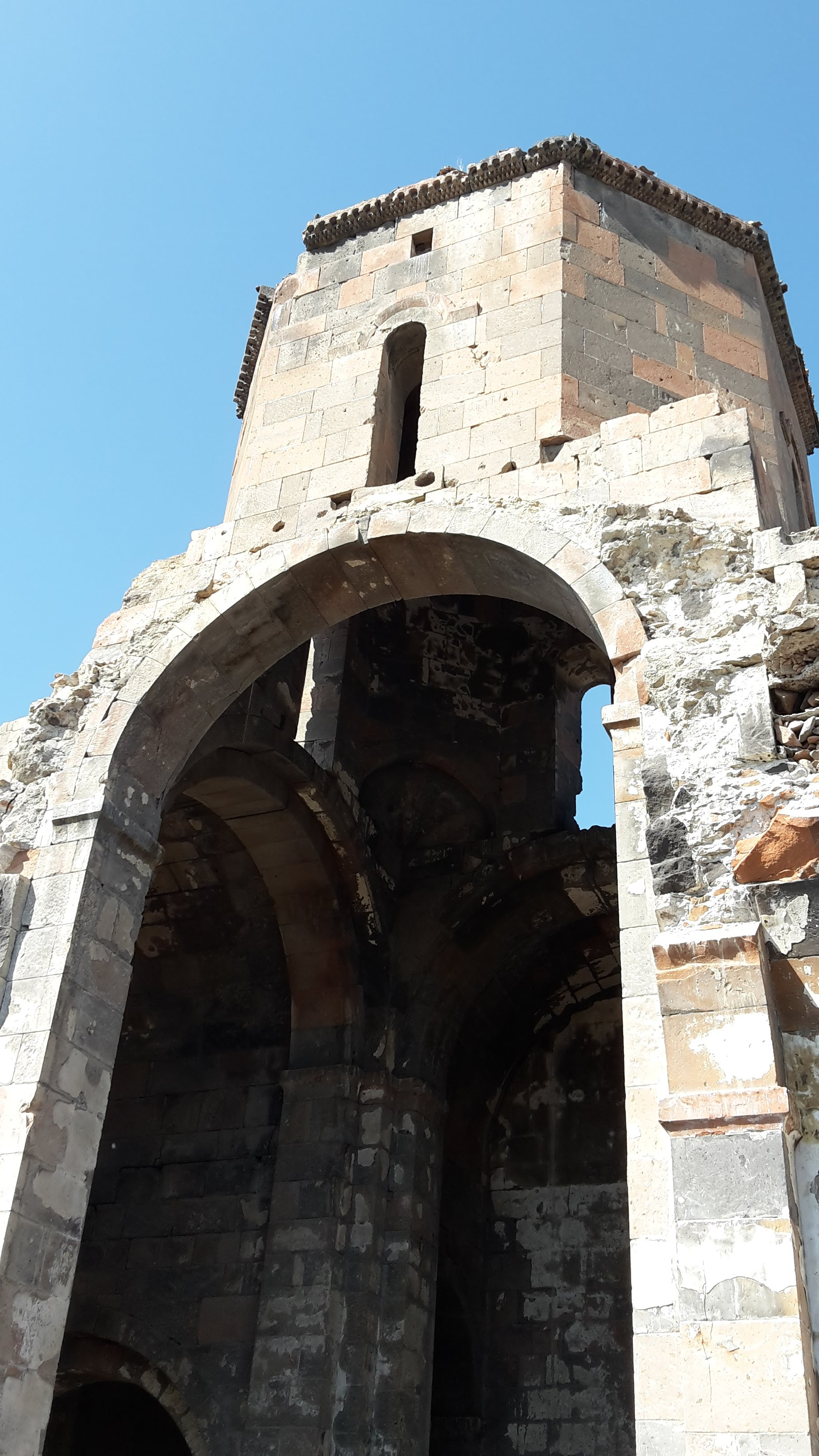

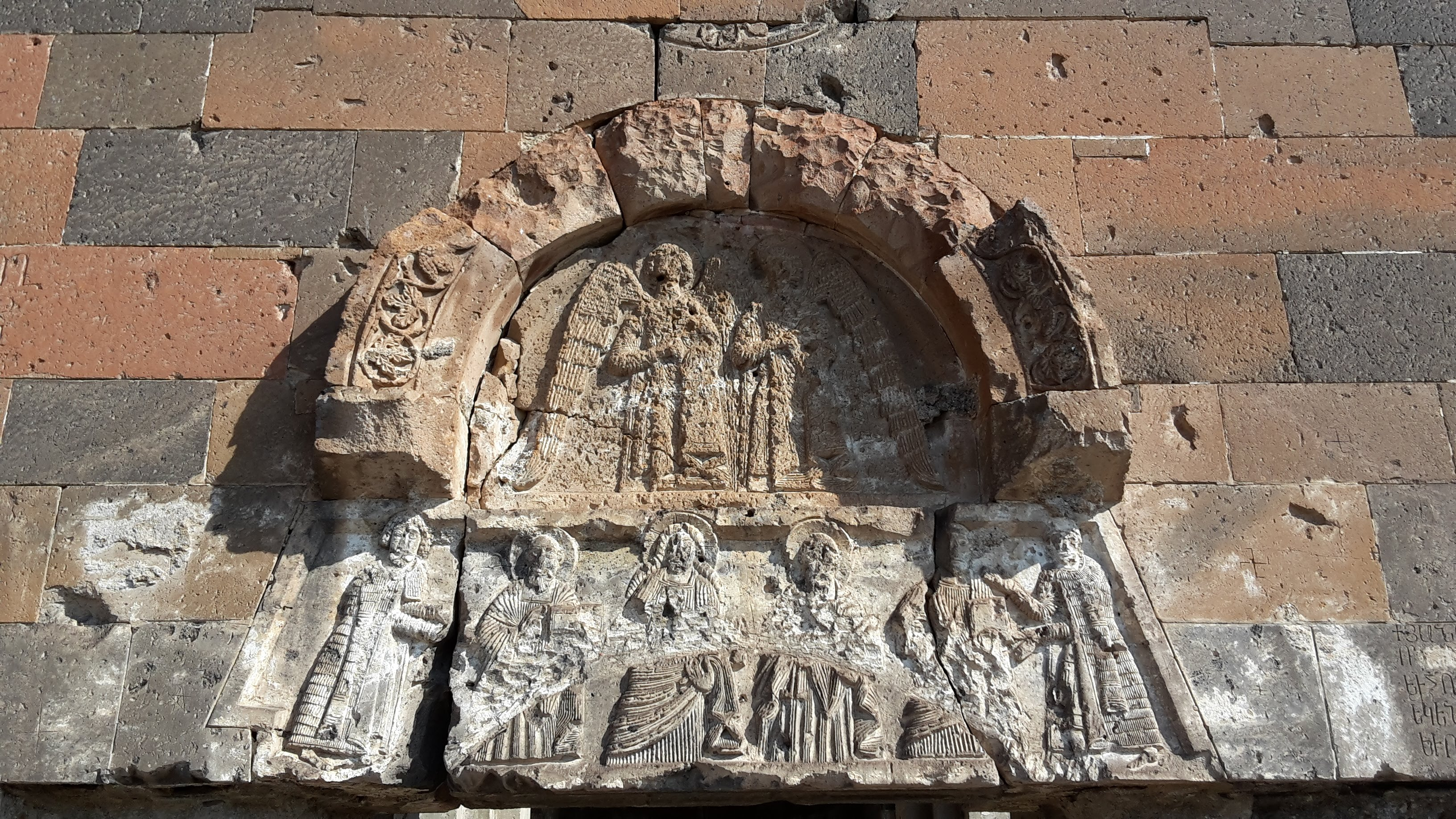
Portal with relief

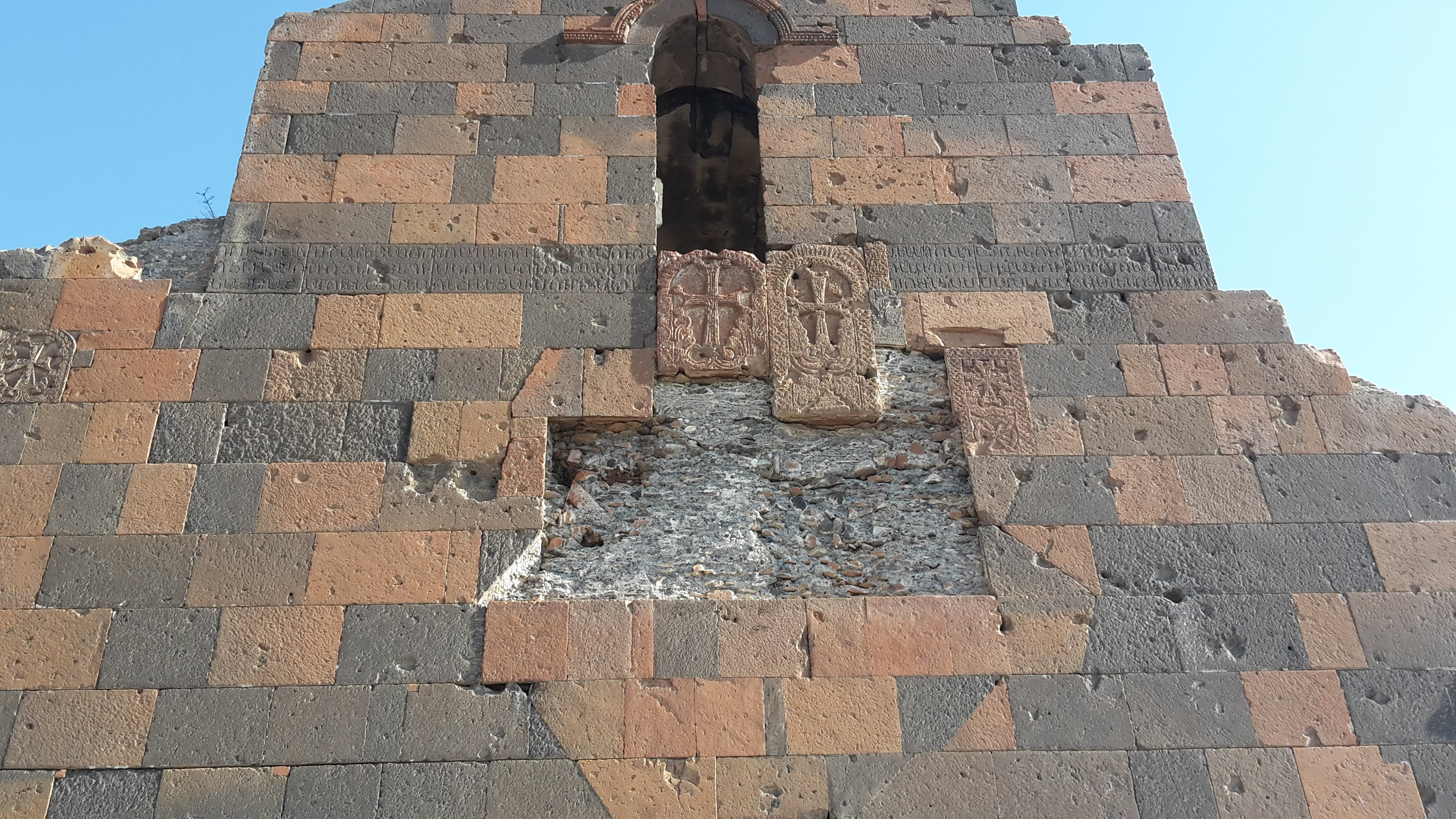
Facade with khachkars

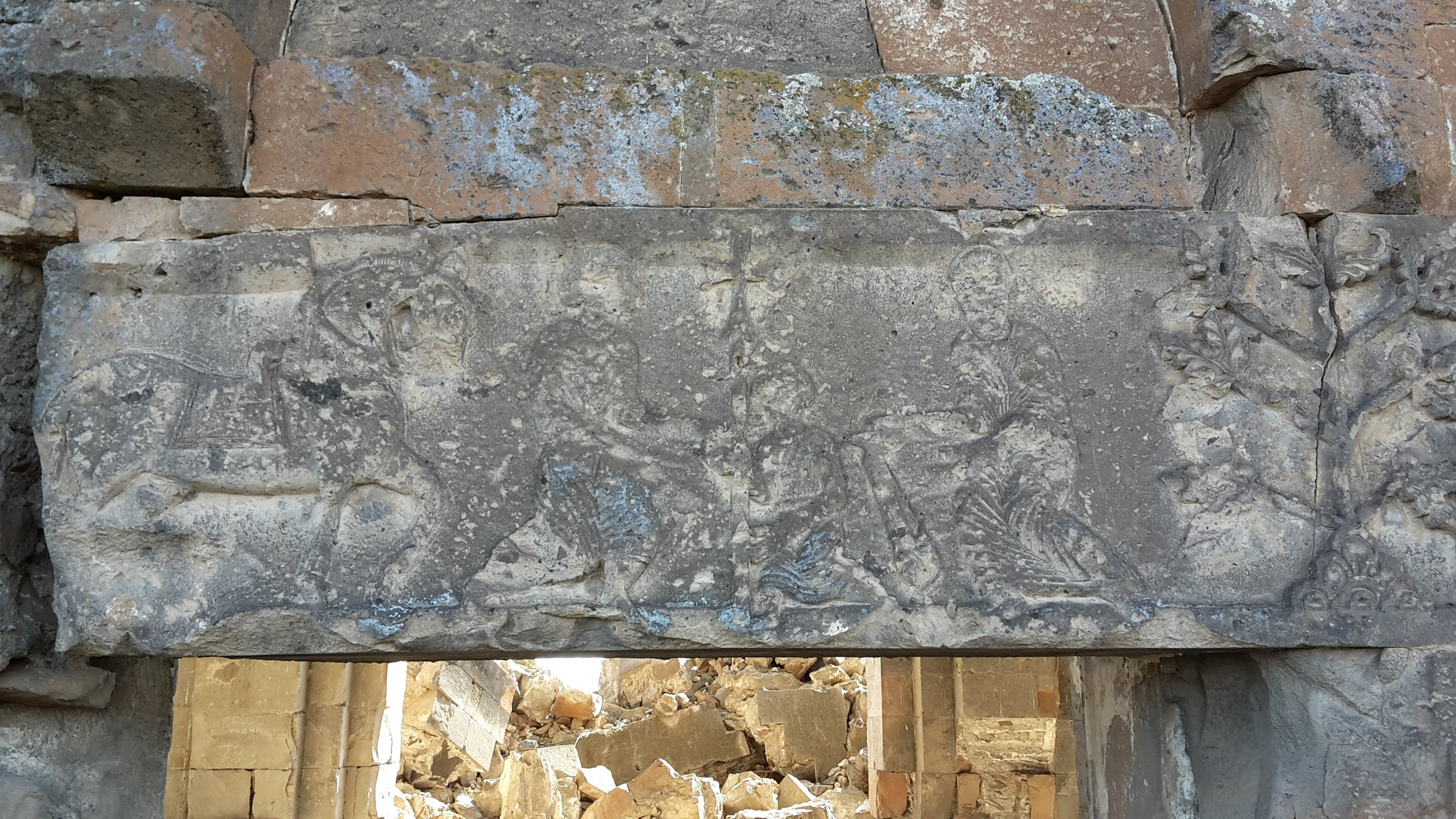
Lintel with relief

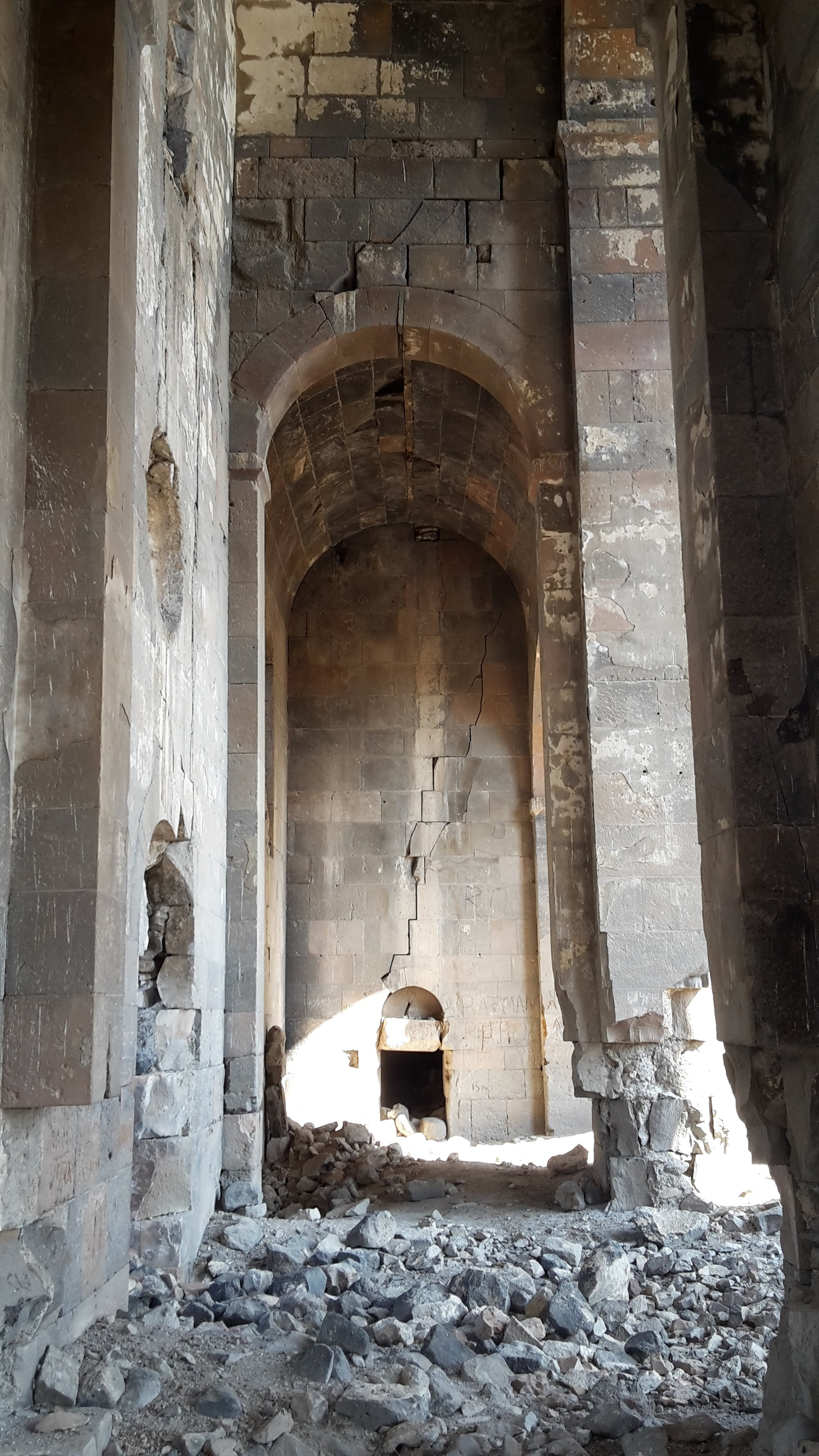
Side aisle

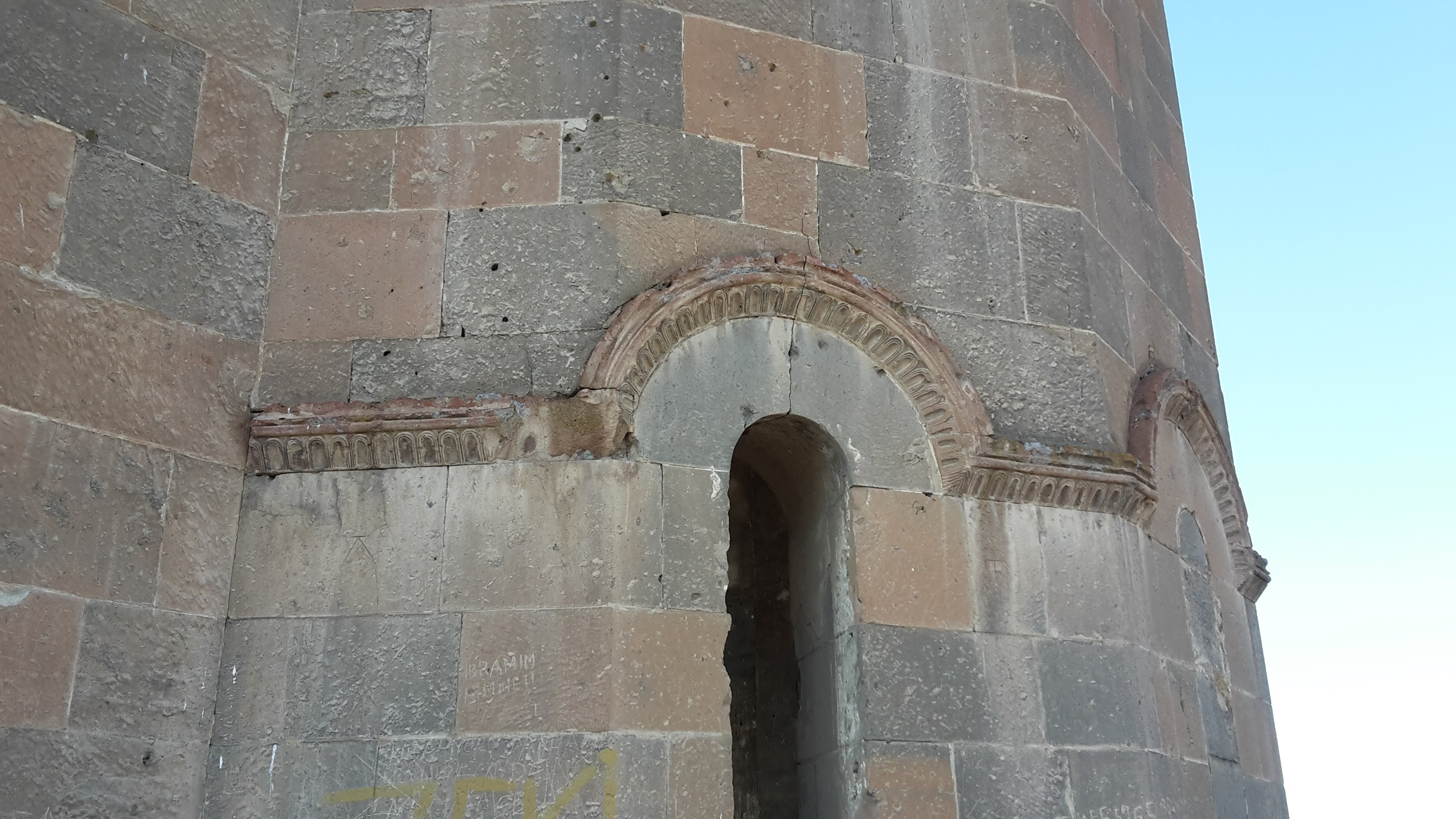
Apse

== See also ==
- Odzun Church, an architecturally similar and contemporaneous three-nave basilica with dome in Odzun, Armenia
- Ani Cathedral, another ruined Armenian church near Mren
