= Odzun Church =

5th–7th century church in Armenia

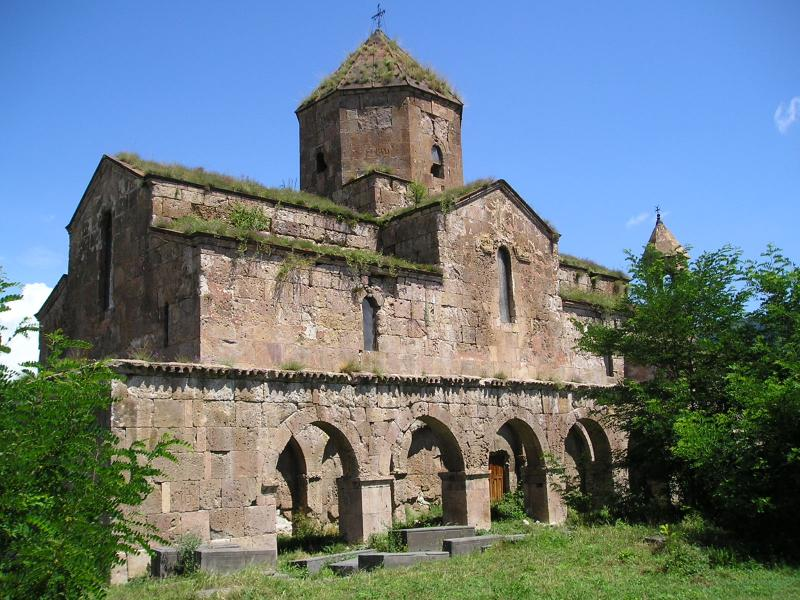
- Southern side of the Odzun Church

- Location within Armenia

Religion
- Affiliation: Armenian Apostolic Church

Location
- Location: Odzun, Lori Province, Armenia
- Coordinates: 41.050850°N 44.616416°E

Architecture
- Type: Three-nave basilica with dome
- Style: Armenian
- Completed: c. 5th–7th century

Odzun Church (Armenian: Օձունի եկեղեցի) is an Armenian basilica constructed around the 5th–7th century in the Odzun village of the Lori Province of Armenia.

== History ==
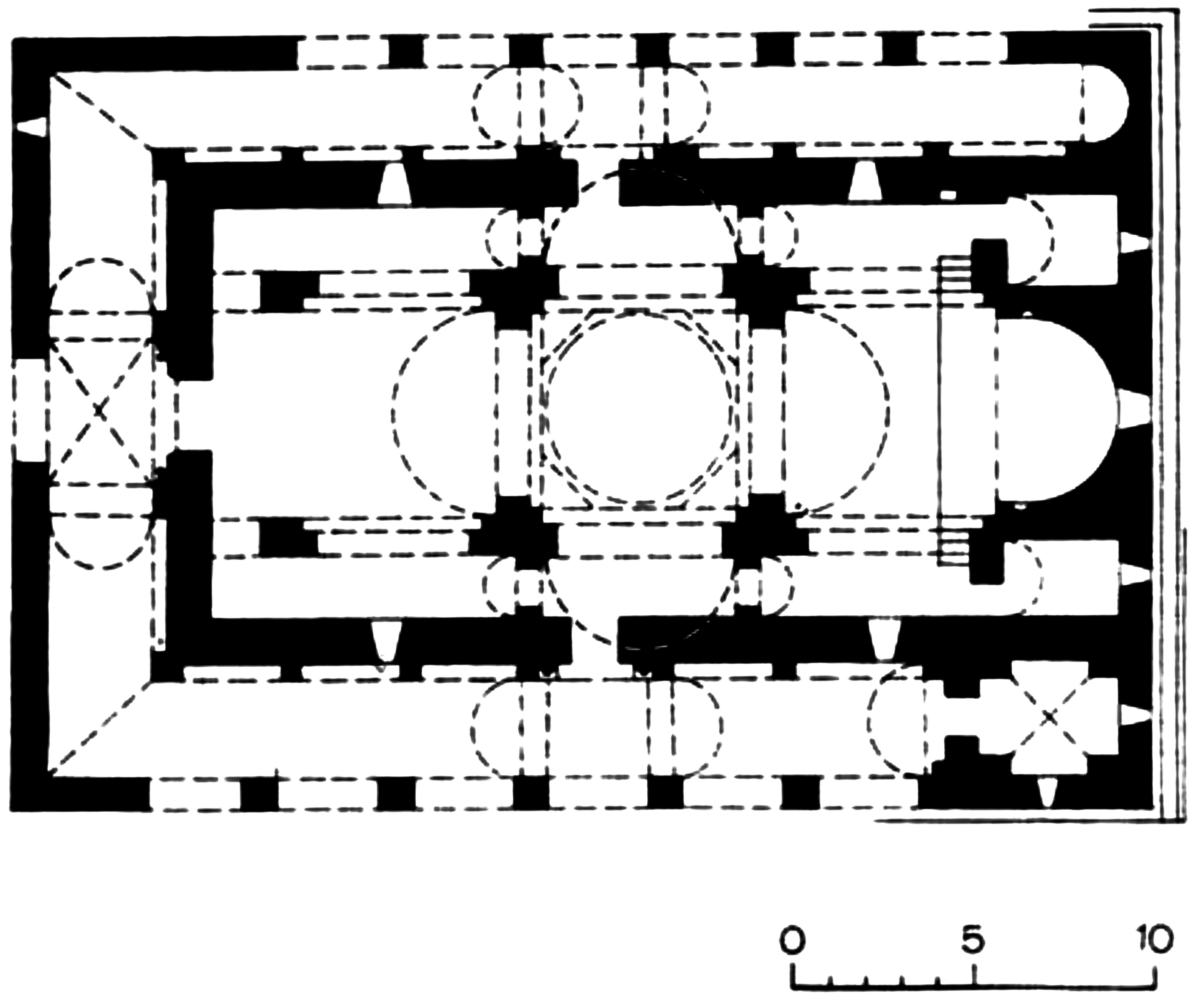
Plan of Odzun Church

The first church appeared here in the 6th century. In the 8th century it was reconstructed by Hovhannes III Odznetsi (Հովհաննես Գ Օձնեցի) who served as the katholikos between 717 and 728 and was, as his name suggests, from Odzun. This is the time the church got its current form of a pink felsite basilica with three naves, the two side naves being narrow. At the northern (not preserved anymore) and southern side there are unusual arcaded cloisters and the west cloister has a blind wall with an arched entrance in the middle.

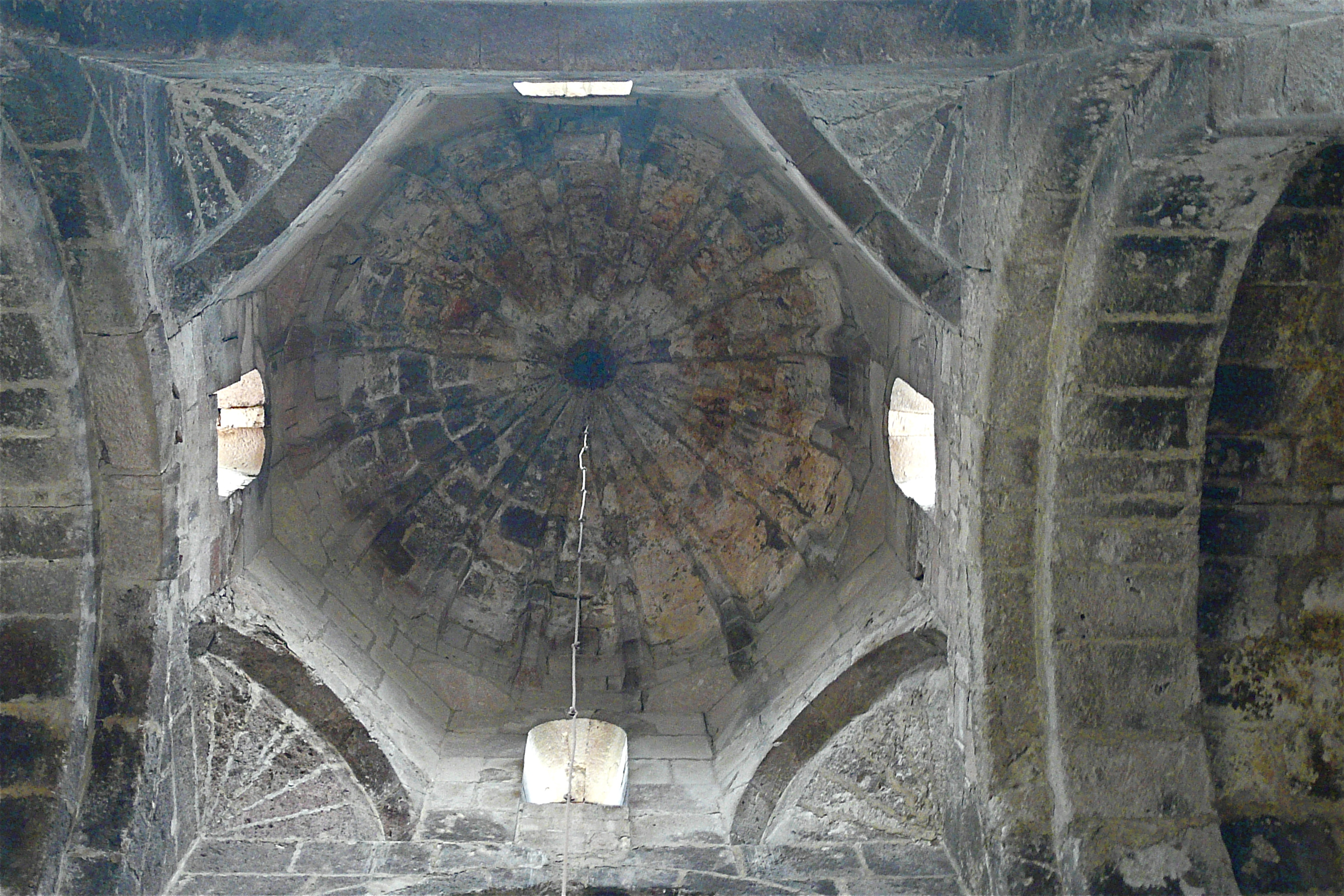
Squinches supporting the dome, interior view

The roof is barrel vaulted. Four columns support the rib vaulted tambour and there are two more columns at the western part of the church. At the eastern façade above the central window one can observe a carving of Christ with the gospel of St. John and two angels below. At the southern façade, at each side of the central window there are two angels and traces of another figure, probably Christ. Much later, in the 19th century two small bell towers were added. The church was renovated between 2012 and 2014.

There are numerous gravestones of the clergy around the church, as well as a funerary monument. Its stepped platform supports two carved stelae, each within one of a set of double arches. The east and west sides of the monument are carved with scenes from the Bible and introduction of Christianity in Armenia. Its north and south side are carved with geometrical motifs and floral shapes. It is suggested that this monument commemorates Hovhannes Odznetsi, but its style suggests that it was probably erected earlier, in the 6th century.

This is one of only two such funerary monuments in Armenia. The one located in Odzun is claimed to have been given as a gift to Armenia from an Indian king around the 8th century. The other one is situated in Aghudi in southern Armenian province of Syunik.

== Gallery ==
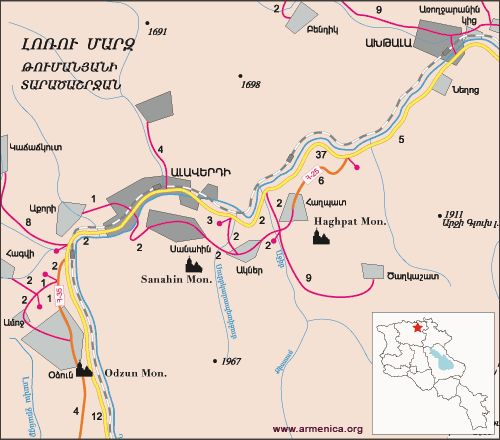
Map of Odzun and surrounding region

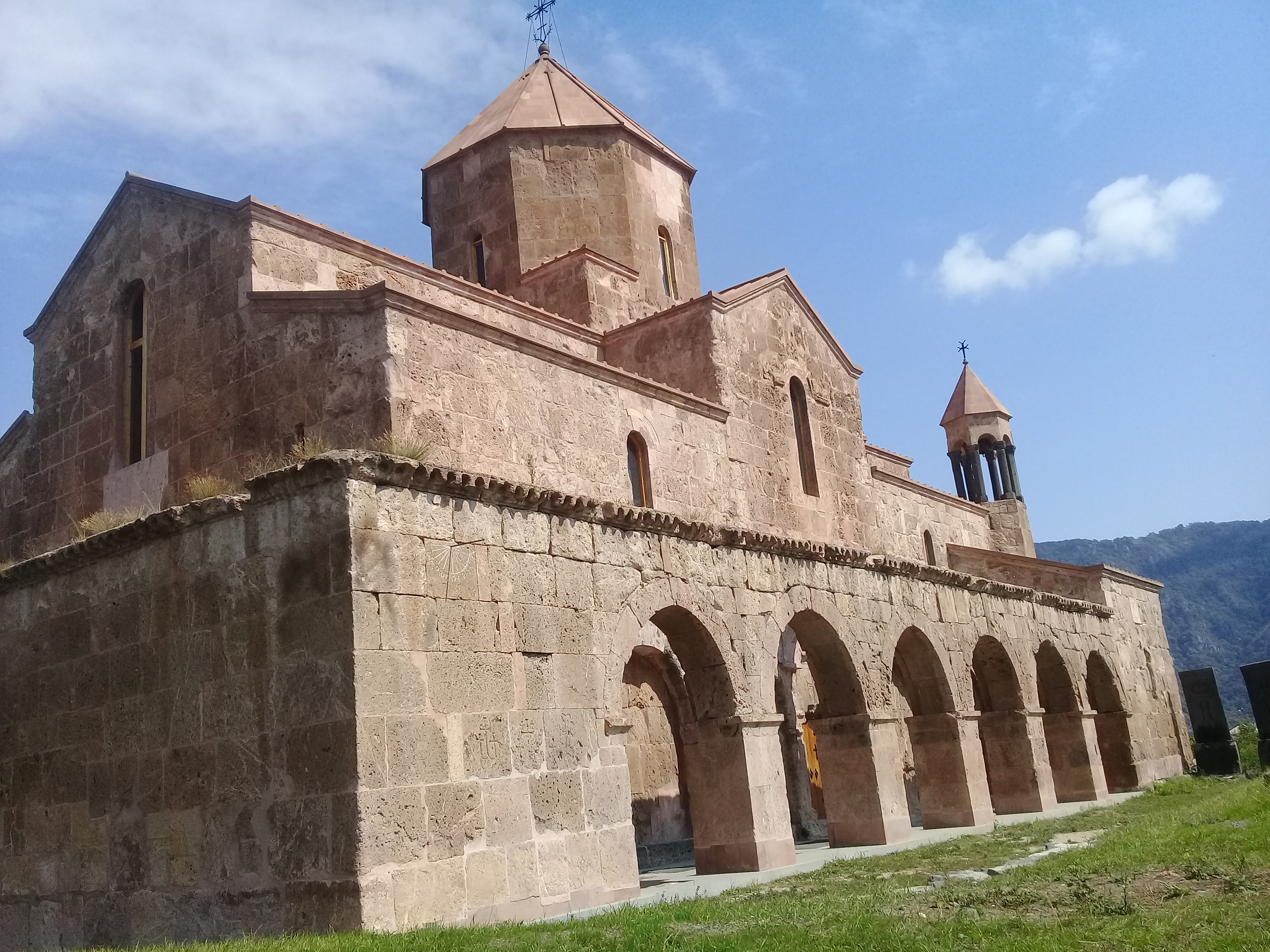

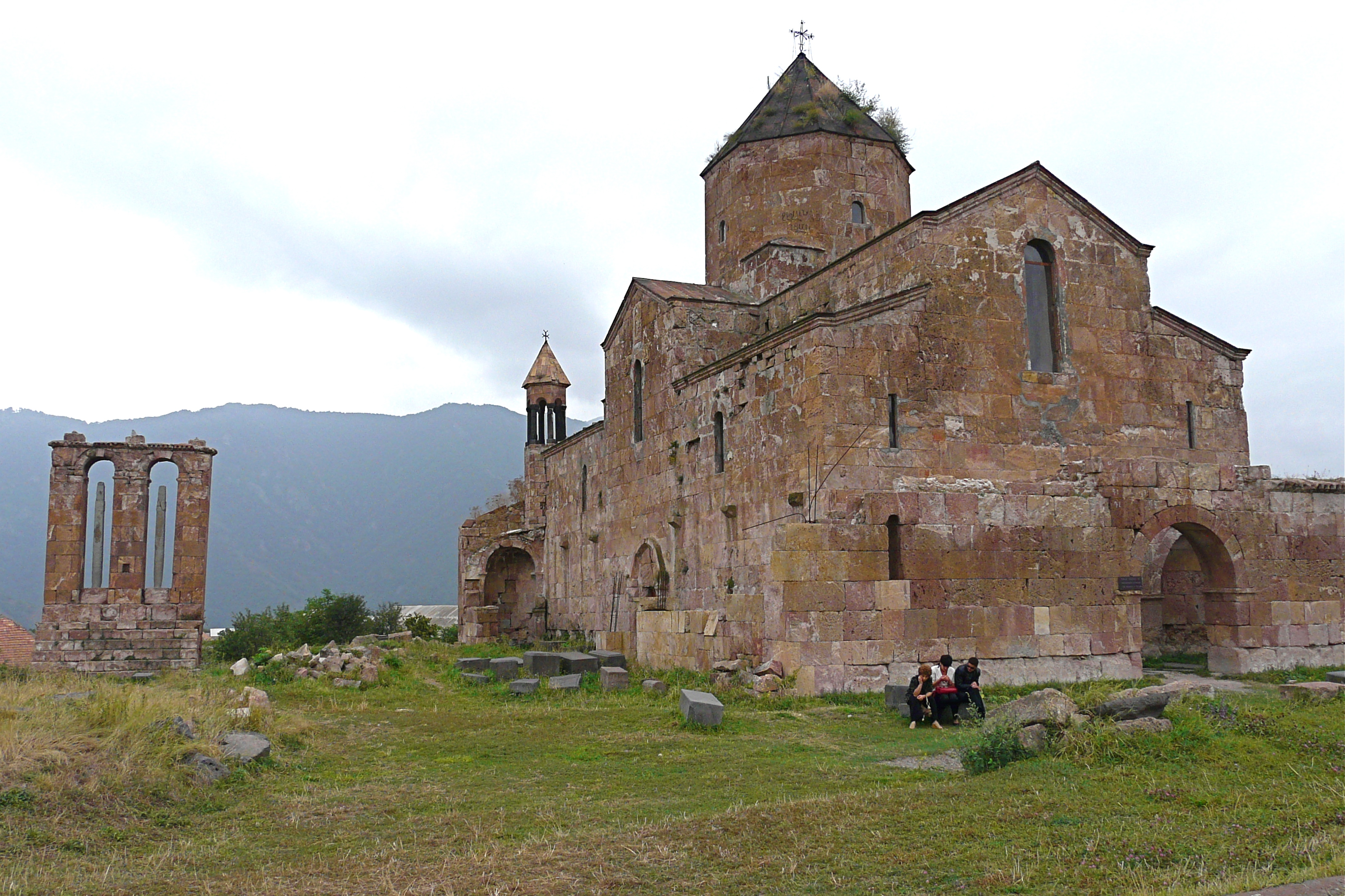
North and west sides of the church

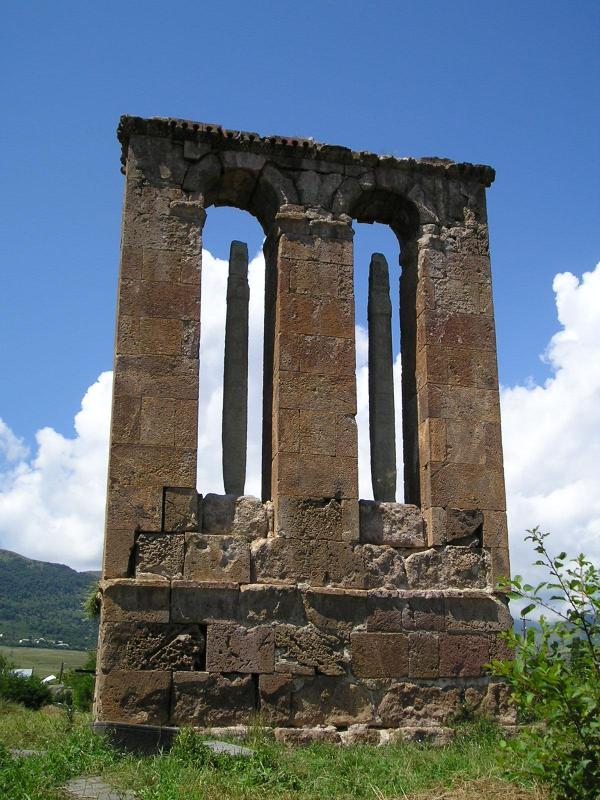
Funerary monument.

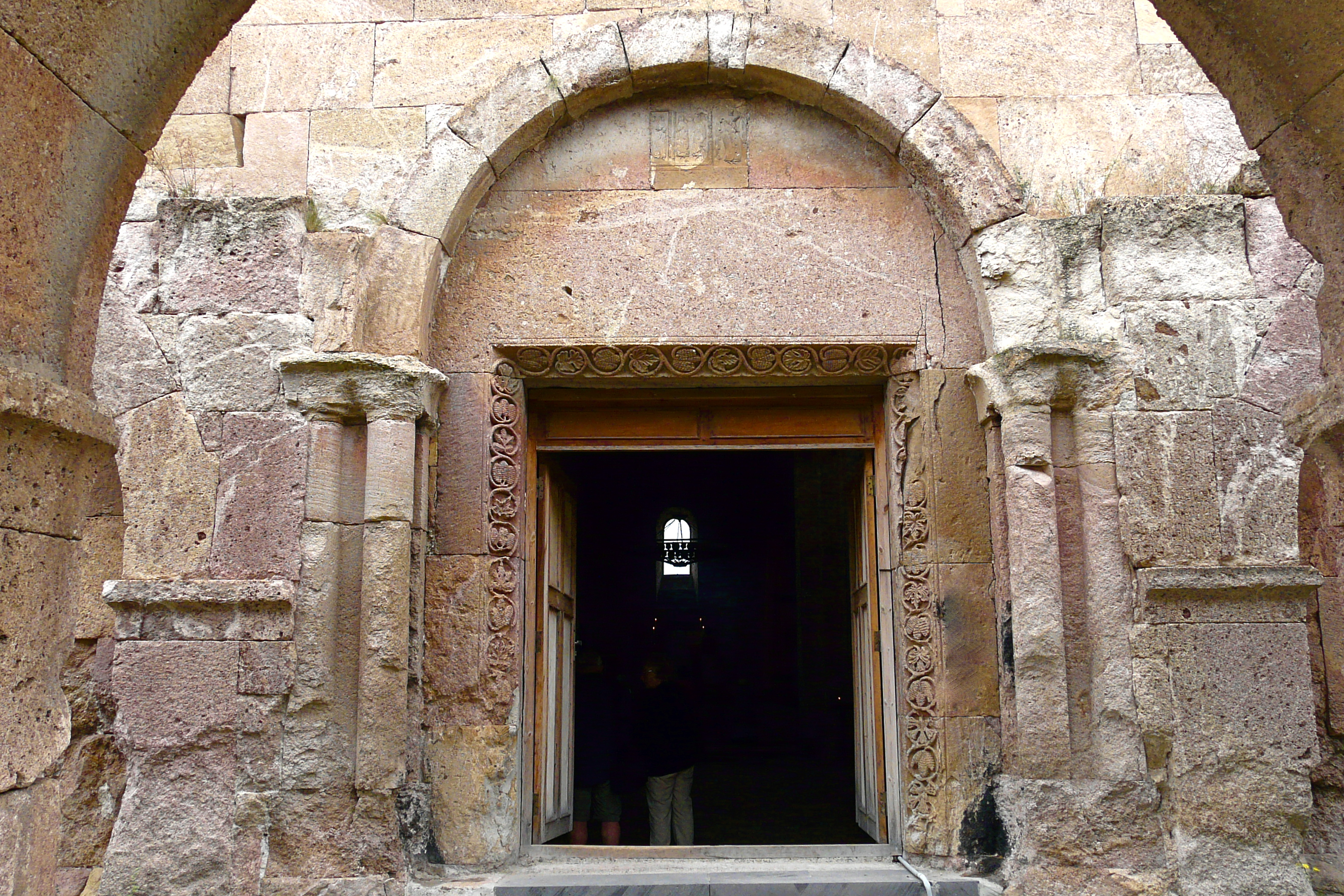
Portal to the church

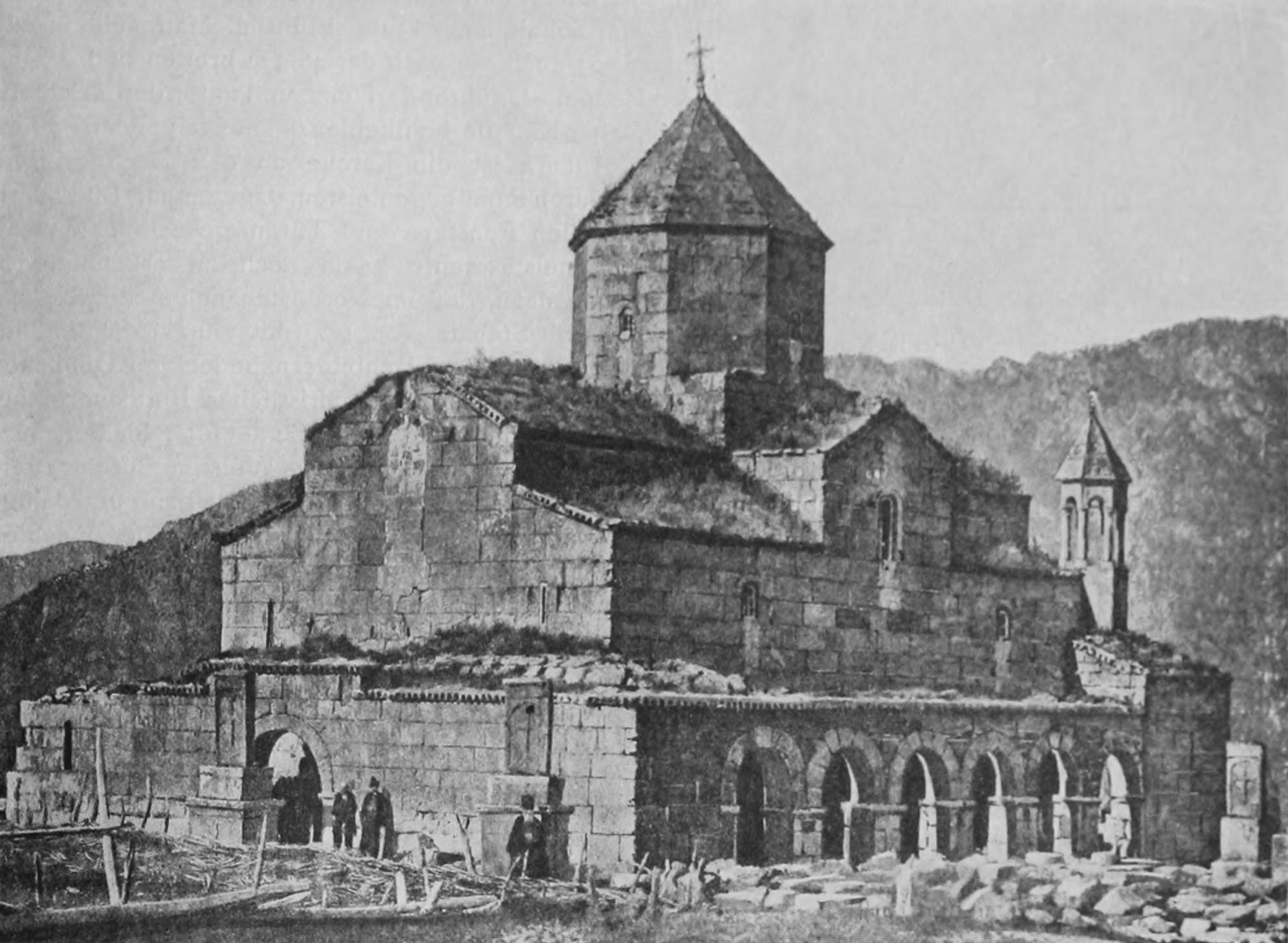
The church in the early 20th century

== See also ==
- Cathedral of Mren, a similar and contemporaneous three-nave basilica with dome in historical Armenia (in Turkey)
