= Odzun =

Odzun Օձուն
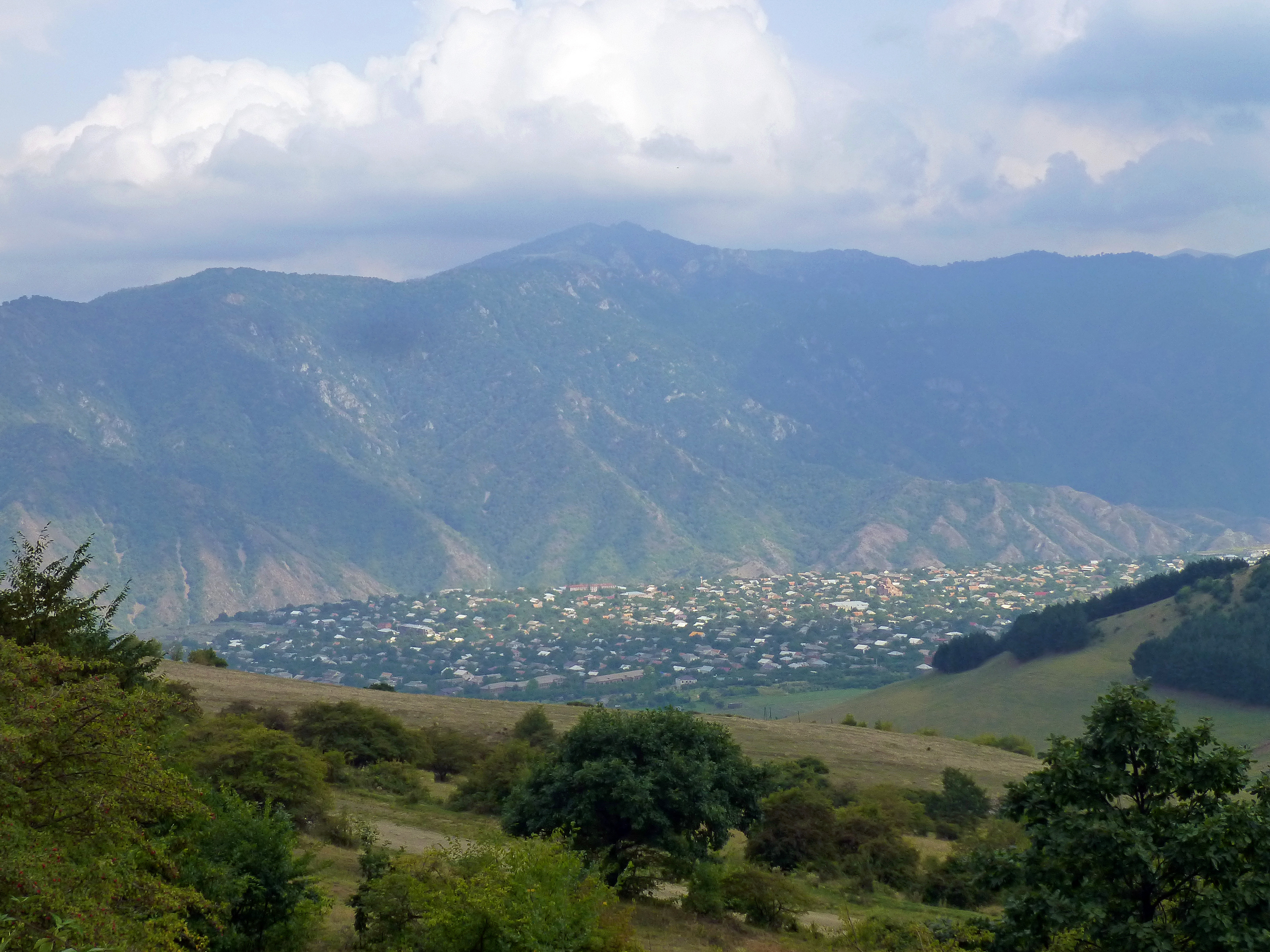

- Location within Armenia
- Coordinates: 41°03′14″N 44°36′41″E
- Country: Armenia
- Province: Lori

Area
  - Total: 5.32 km^{2} (2.05 sq mi)
- Elevation: 1,100 m (3,600 ft)

Population (2011)
  - Total: 4,048
- Time zone: UTC+4 (AMT)

Odzun (Armenian: Օձուն) is a village in the Lori Province of Armenia. It is situated on a plateau above the left bank of the Debed river gorge, about a thousand metres above the Yerevan–Tbilisi highway, a few kilometres south of the town of Alaverdi. It is famous for the 5th–7th century Odzun Church, an Armenian basilica with a cupola, overlooking the gorge.

== Toponymy ==
Garnik Asatrian and Gohar G. Hakobian derive the name of the village from the Armenian word օծել (otsel), "to anoint, consecrate, to sanctify" via the dialectal version օծուն (otsun). According to another explanation, the name of the village derives from the Armenian word odz 'snake'; thus, Odzun means 'having many snakes' or 'place of snakes'. The name of the village is attested in various forms, such as Otsun, Ozun, Adzun and Udzun. Turkic speakers called the village Uzunlar, formed by etymological reinterpretation of the Armenian name (uzun means 'tall' or 'long', and -lar is a plural-forming suffix). The village was officially known by this latter name from the beginning of the 19th century until 1967, when it was renamed Odzun.

== History ==
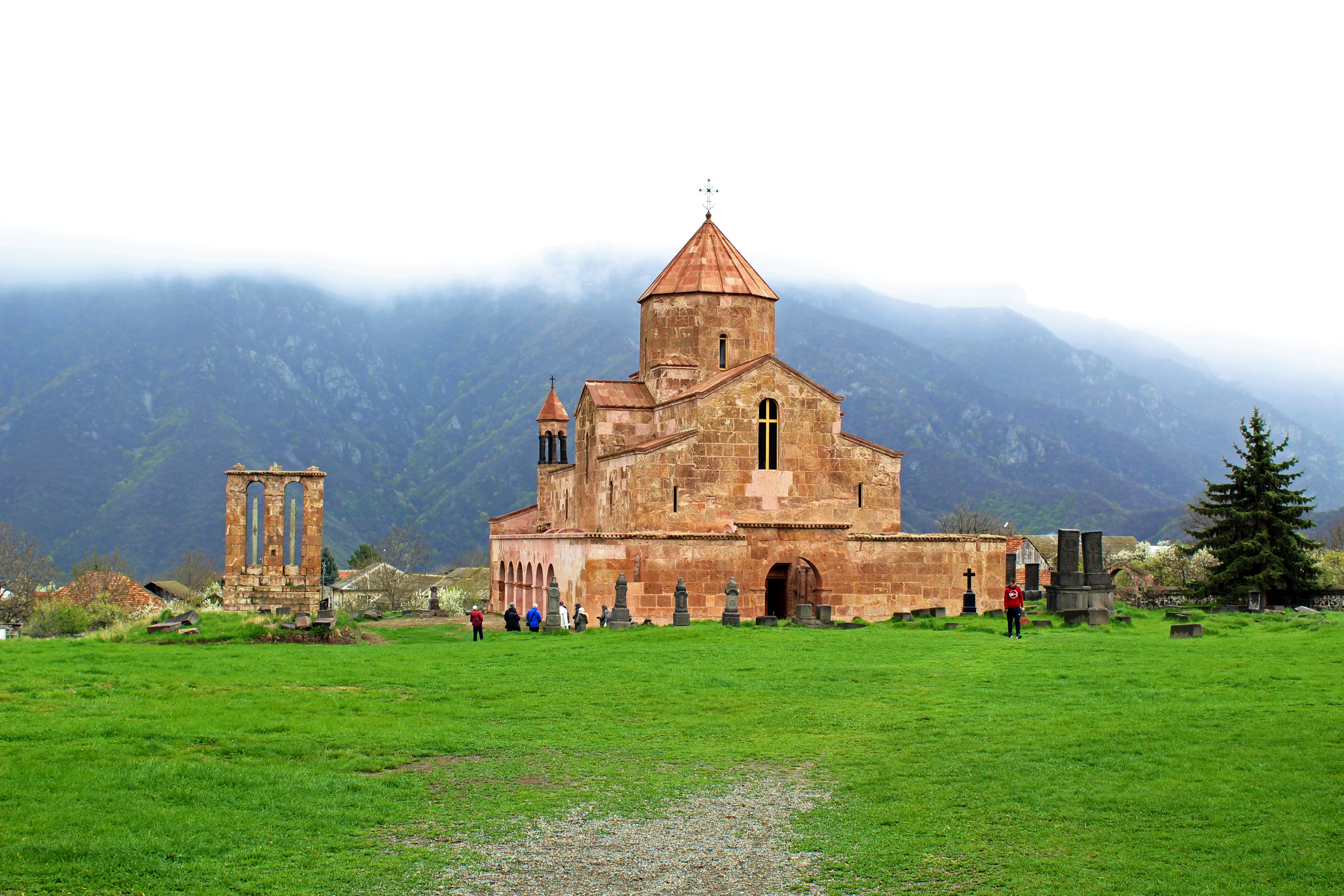
Odzun Church

In antiquity, Odzun was located in the Tashir district of the province of Gugark. It is mentioned in written sources from the 8th century onward and is one of the oldest settlements in the district of Tashir. In the early medieval period, it served as the center of that district. The 8th-century head of the Armenian Church, Catholicos John of Odzun (Hovhan Odznetsi), hailed from this village. In the 13th century, Vardan Areveltsi referred to the settlement as a large village or small town (avan). There are antiquities from various periods in the village and its vicinity. The Odzun Church, an Armenian basilica with a cupola, is located in the center of the village. There was once an extensive cemetery with khachkars surrounding the church. The date of the church's construction is disputed. According to some authors, it was constructed in the 8th century and consecrated by John of Odzun, while others believe it was built as early as the end of the 6th century and later renovated by Catholicos John. Near the church is a funerary monument with carved images dating to the 5th–6th centuries, but which tradition attributes to one of the Bagratid kings. The remains of a 5th-century single-nave church called Tsaghkavank are located on the outskirts of the village.

== Gallery ==
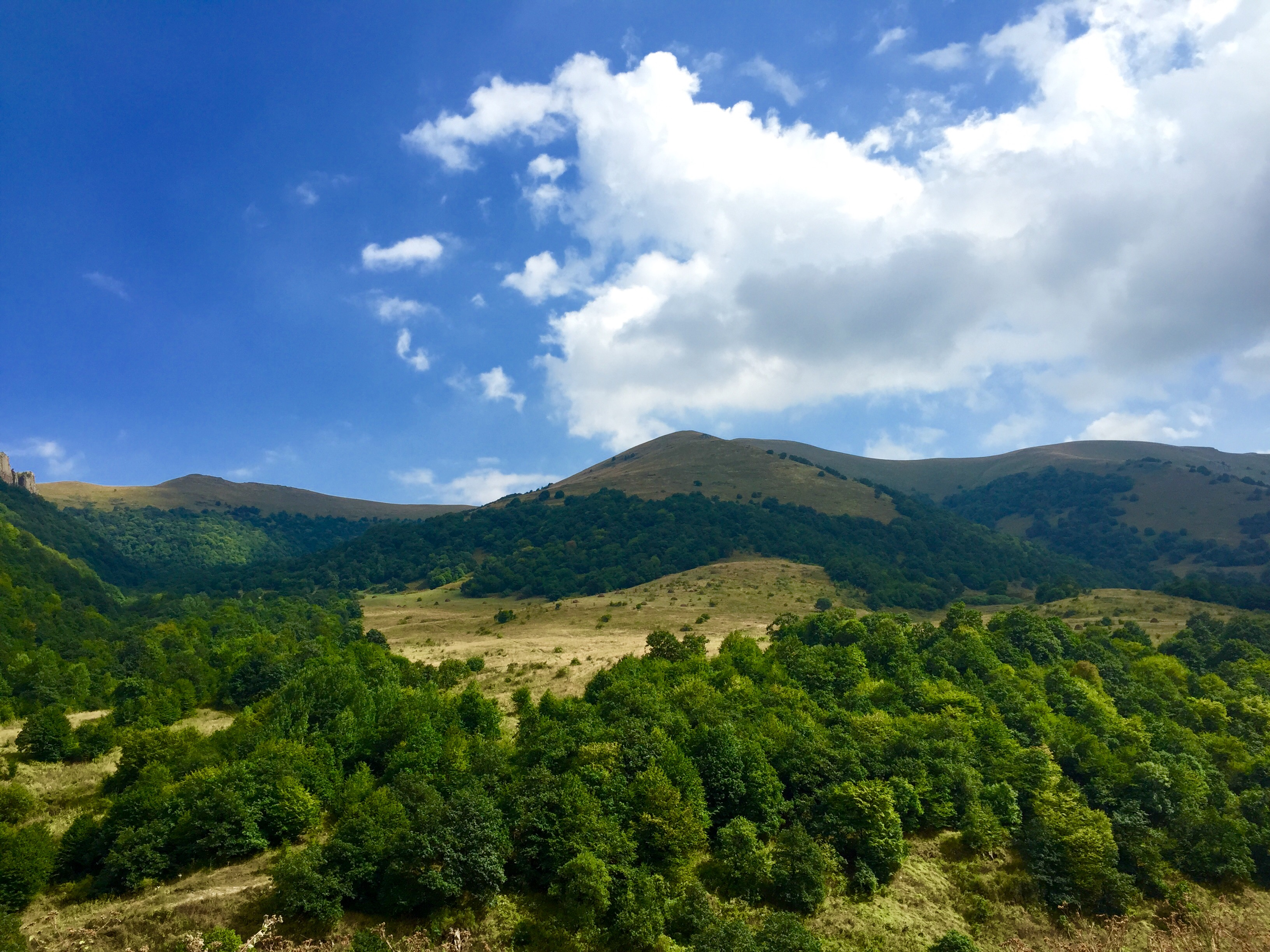

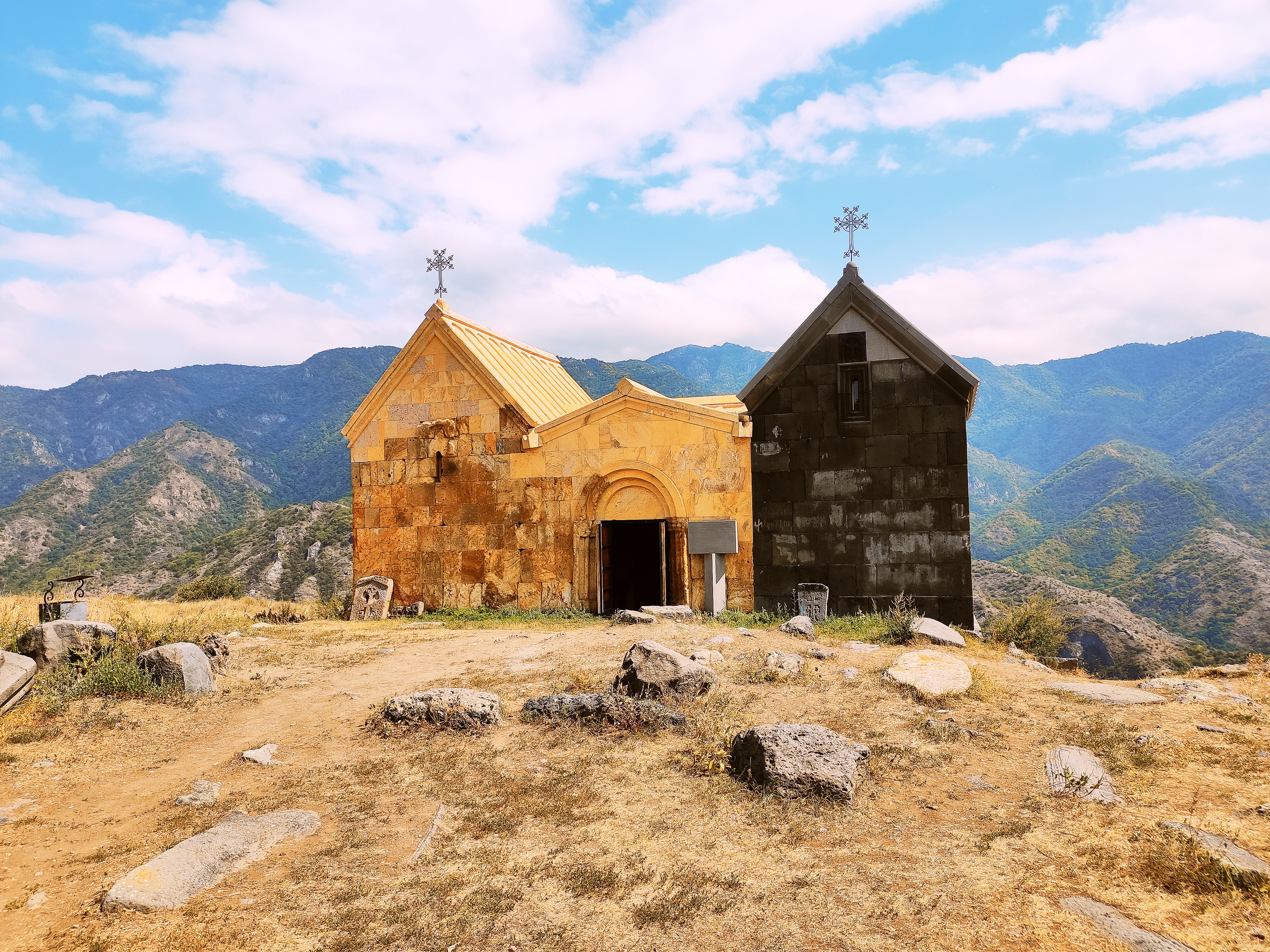

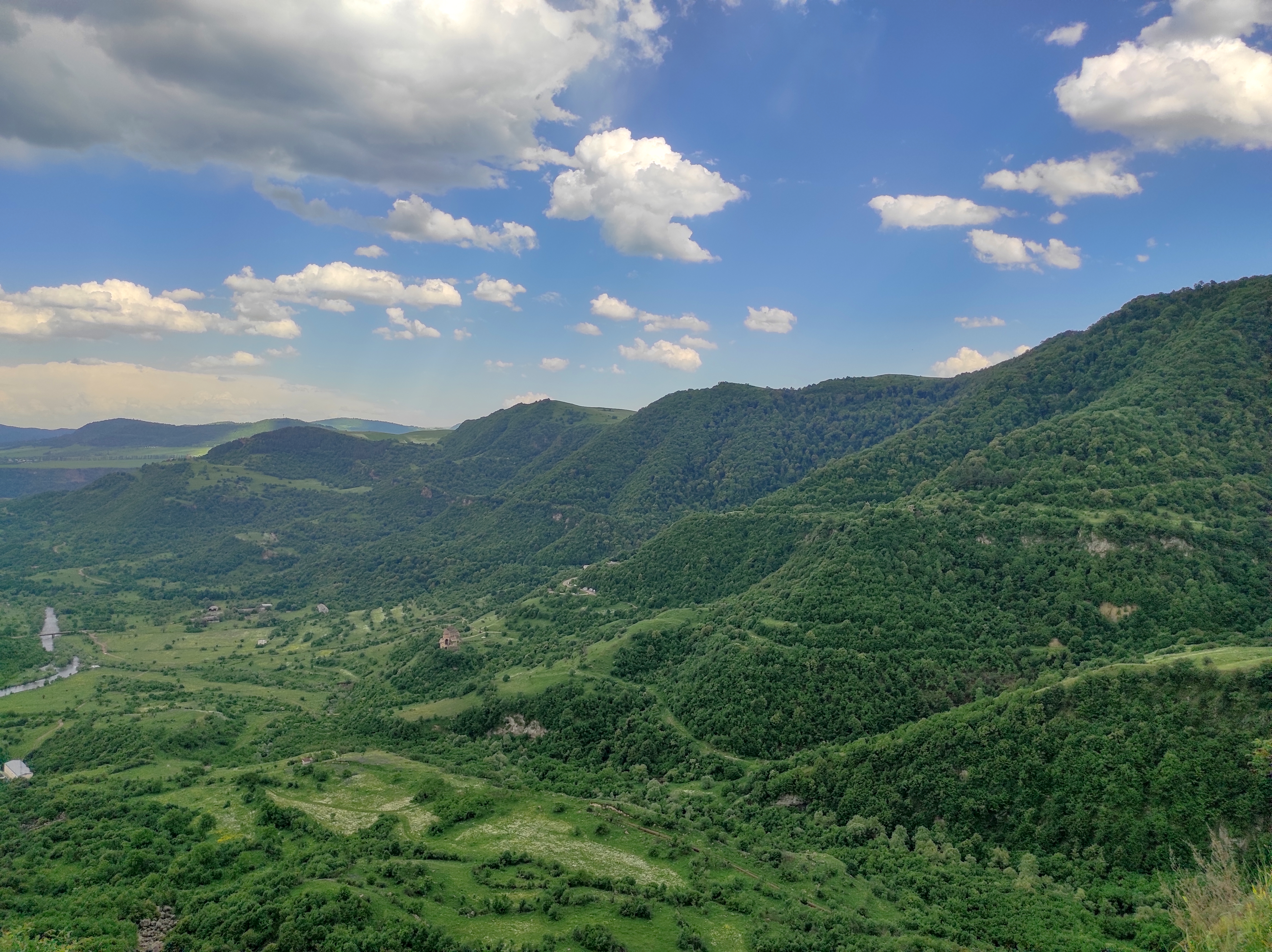

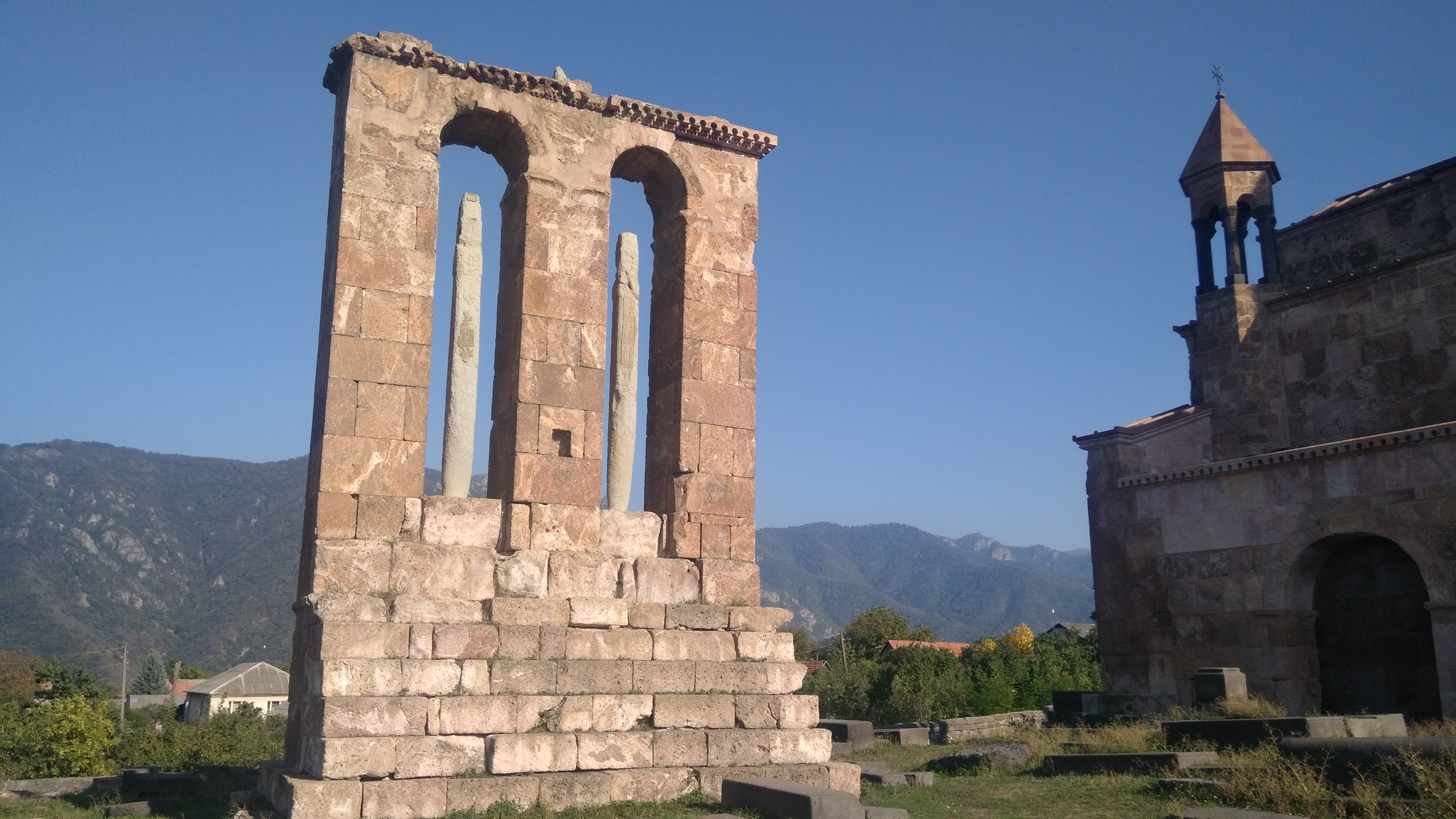

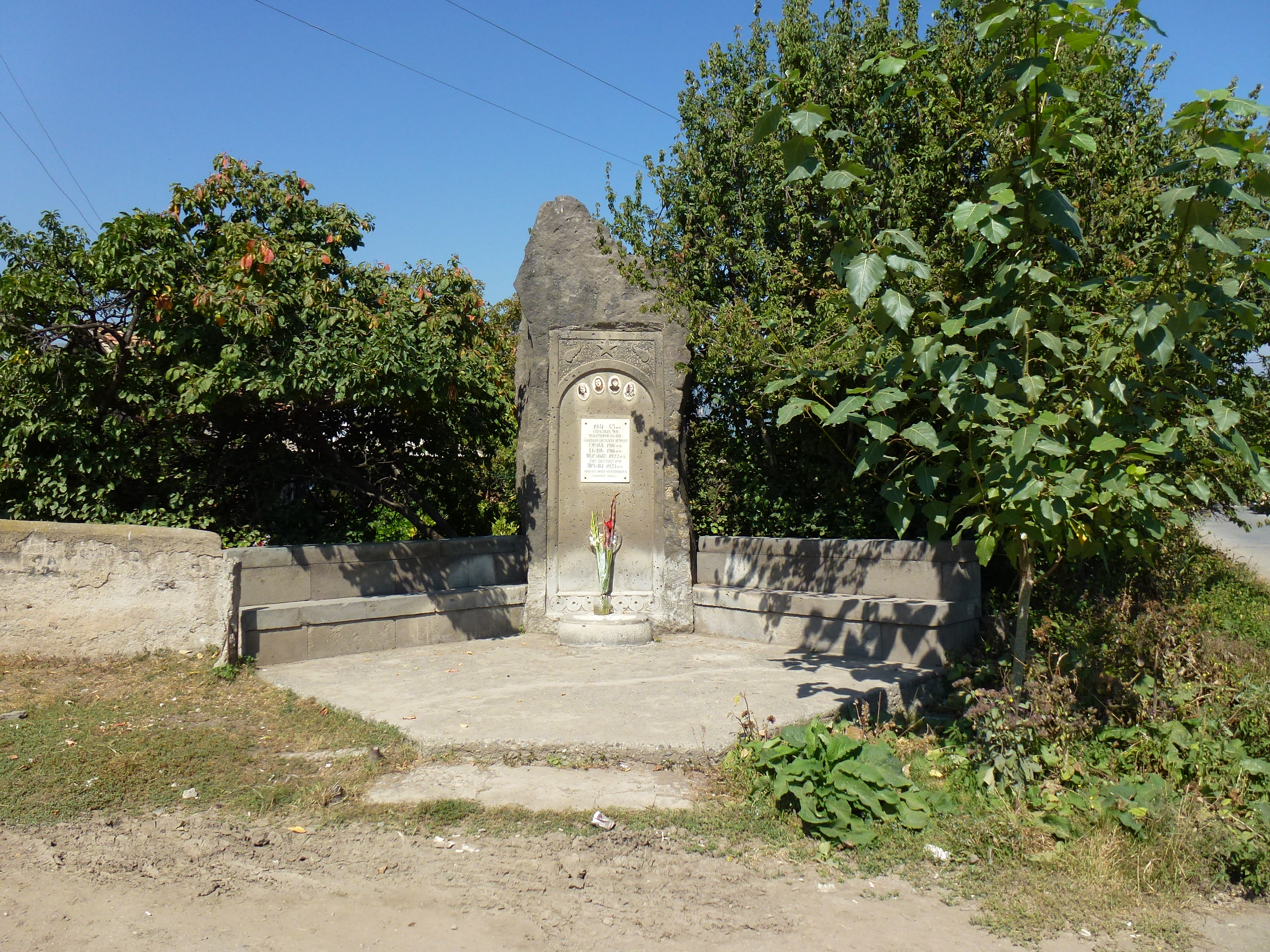

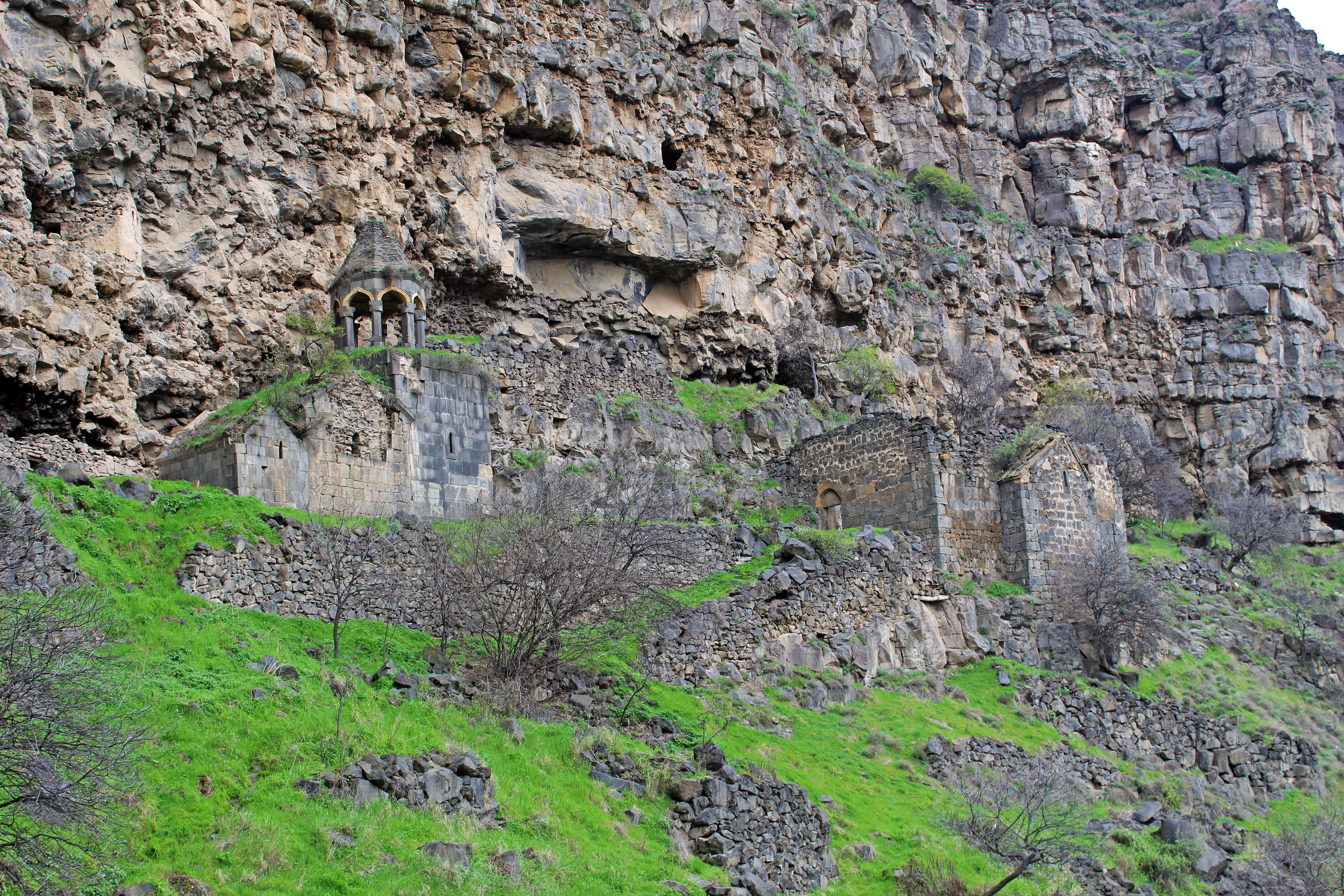

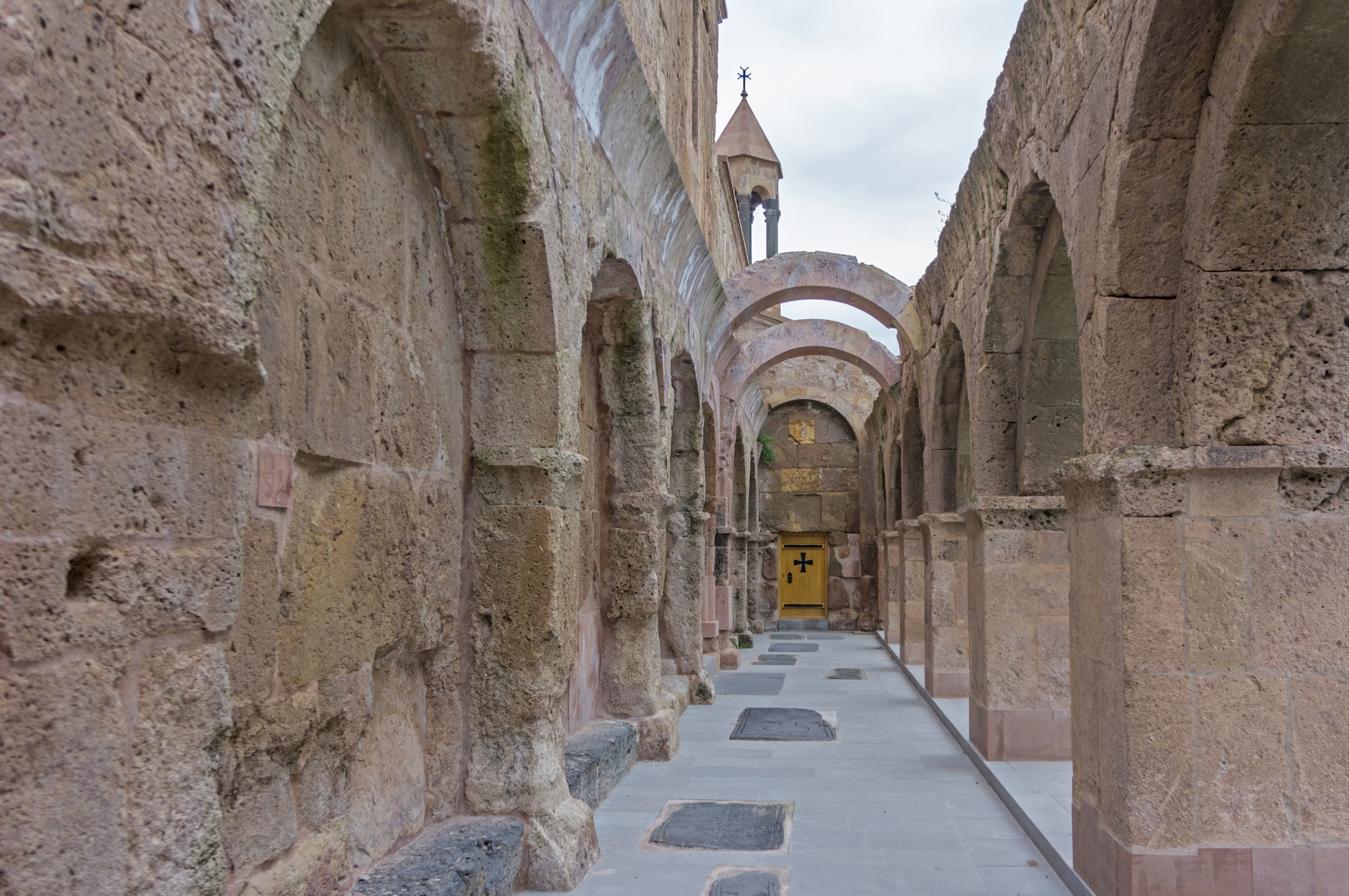

== Geography ==
=== Topography ===
The village is situated on a high plateau on the left bank of the Debed River. It is spread out and surrounded by fruit trees and fertile fields. The village receives its drinking water from a source located 17–18 kilometers (11–11 mi) away.

=== Climate ===
Climate data for Odzun (1991–2020)
Month	Jan	Feb	Mar	Apr	May	Jun	Jul	Aug	Sep	Oct	Nov	Dec	Year
Record high °C (°F)	17.2 (63.0)	18.5 (65.3)	28.0 (82.4)	29.5 (85.1)	30.5 (86.9)	33.8 (92.8)	36.0 (96.8)	38.9 (102.0)	34.7 (94.5)	28.9 (84.0)	24.6 (76.3)	21.0 (69.8)	38.9 (102.0)
Daily mean °C (°F)	−0.5 (31.1)	0.6 (33.1)	4.2 (39.6)	8.8 (47.8)	13.3 (55.9)	17.6 (63.7)	20.4 (68.7)	20.5 (68.9)	16.4 (61.5)	11.2 (52.2)	4.9 (40.8)	0.8 (33.4)	9.9 (49.7)
Record low °C (°F)	−20.0 (−4.0)	−22.9 (−9.2)	−10.5 (13.1)	−9.4 (15.1)	−1.0 (30.2)	2.0 (35.6)	6.4 (43.5)	4.8 (40.6)	−0.4 (31.3)	−4.3 (24.3)	−16.7 (1.9)	−19.6 (−3.3)	−22.9 (−9.2)
Average precipitation mm (inches)	18.0 (0.71)	20.0 (0.79)	31.4 (1.24)	59.6 (2.35)	89.2 (3.51)	90.4 (3.56)	52.5 (2.07)	39.8 (1.57)	41.0 (1.61)	40.3 (1.59)	21.6 (0.85)	12.7 (0.50)	516.5 (20.35)
Average precipitation days (≥ 1.0 mm)	4.5	4.9	7.2	11.2	15.2	12.7	8.7	7.1	6.7	7.4	5.2	3.5	94.3
Average relative humidity (%)	75.7	75.4	76.4	76.3	77.2	73.6	69.4	68.4	74.1	79.2	79.5	76.4	75.1
Source: NOAA
