= Zhamatun (village) =

Zhamatun Ժամատուն
- Location within Armenia
- Coordinates: 40°45′N 44°25′E
- Country: Armenia
- Province: Lori
- Elevation: 1,800 m (5,900 ft)

Population (2011)
  - Total: 9
- Time zone: UTC+4

Zhamatun (Armenian: Ժամատուն), is an abandoned village in the Lori Province of Armenia, belonging to the community of Halavar.

== Population ==
Year	1926	1939	1959	1970	2011
Population	110	136	182	96	9
