= Lori Province =

Province of Armenia

Lori Լոռի
- Province
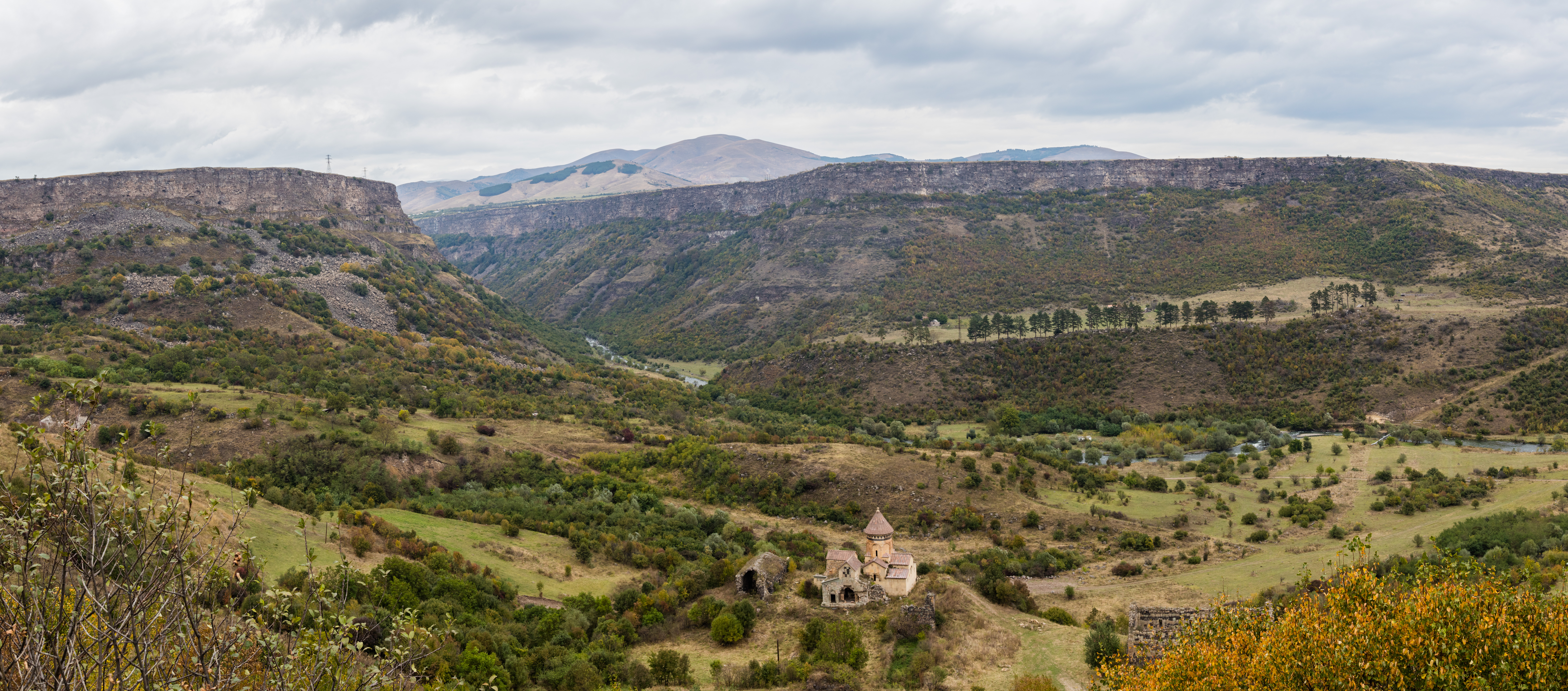
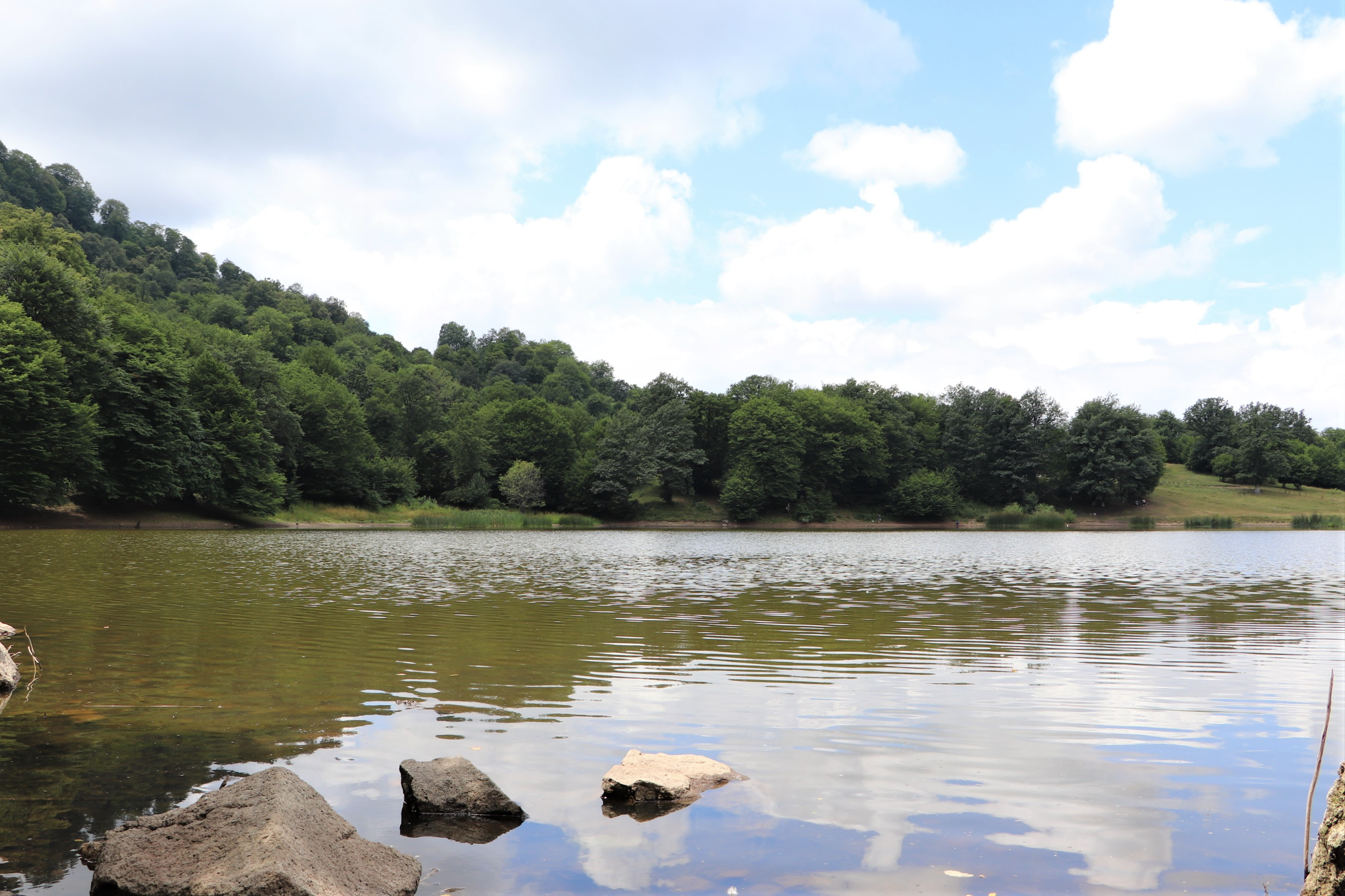
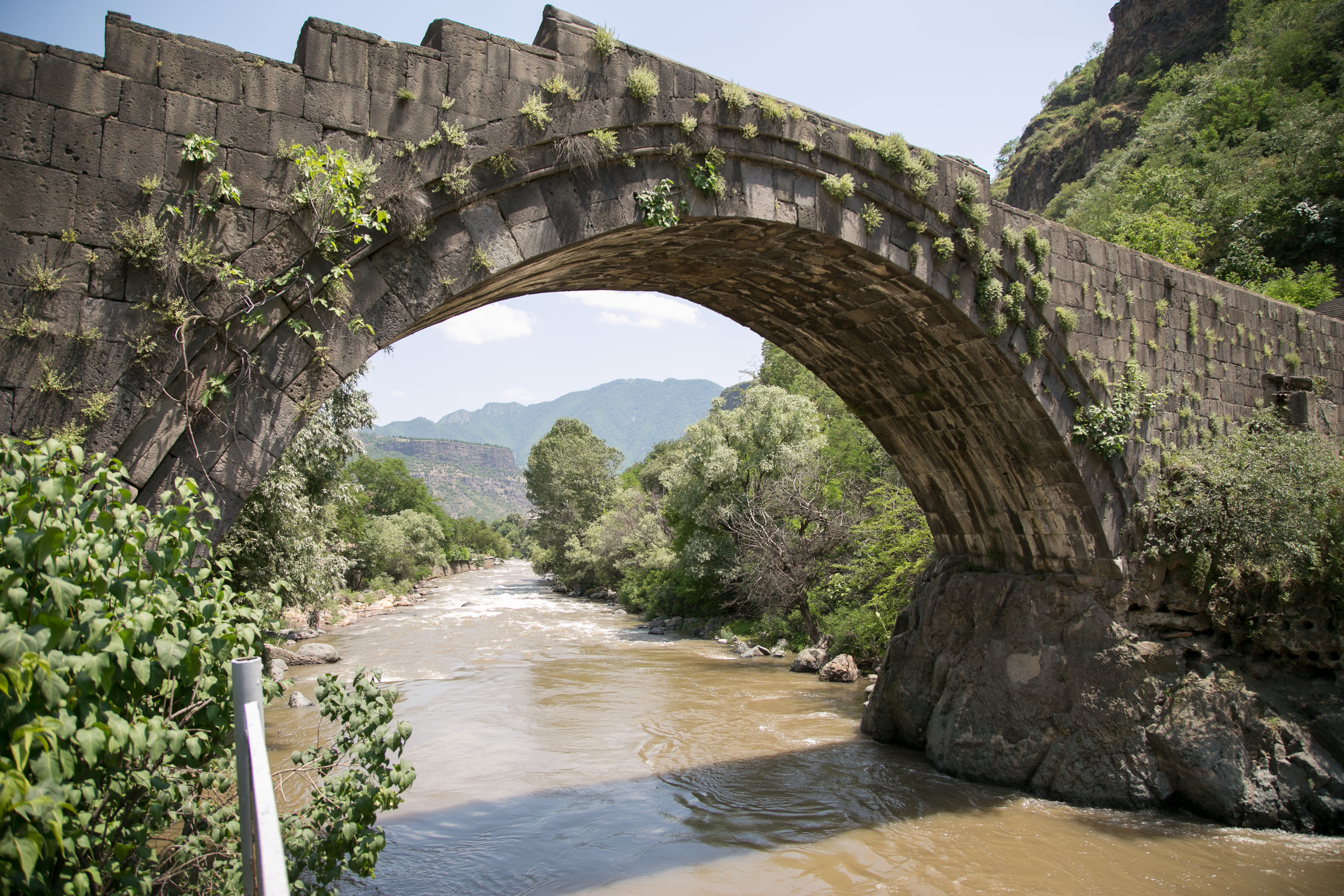
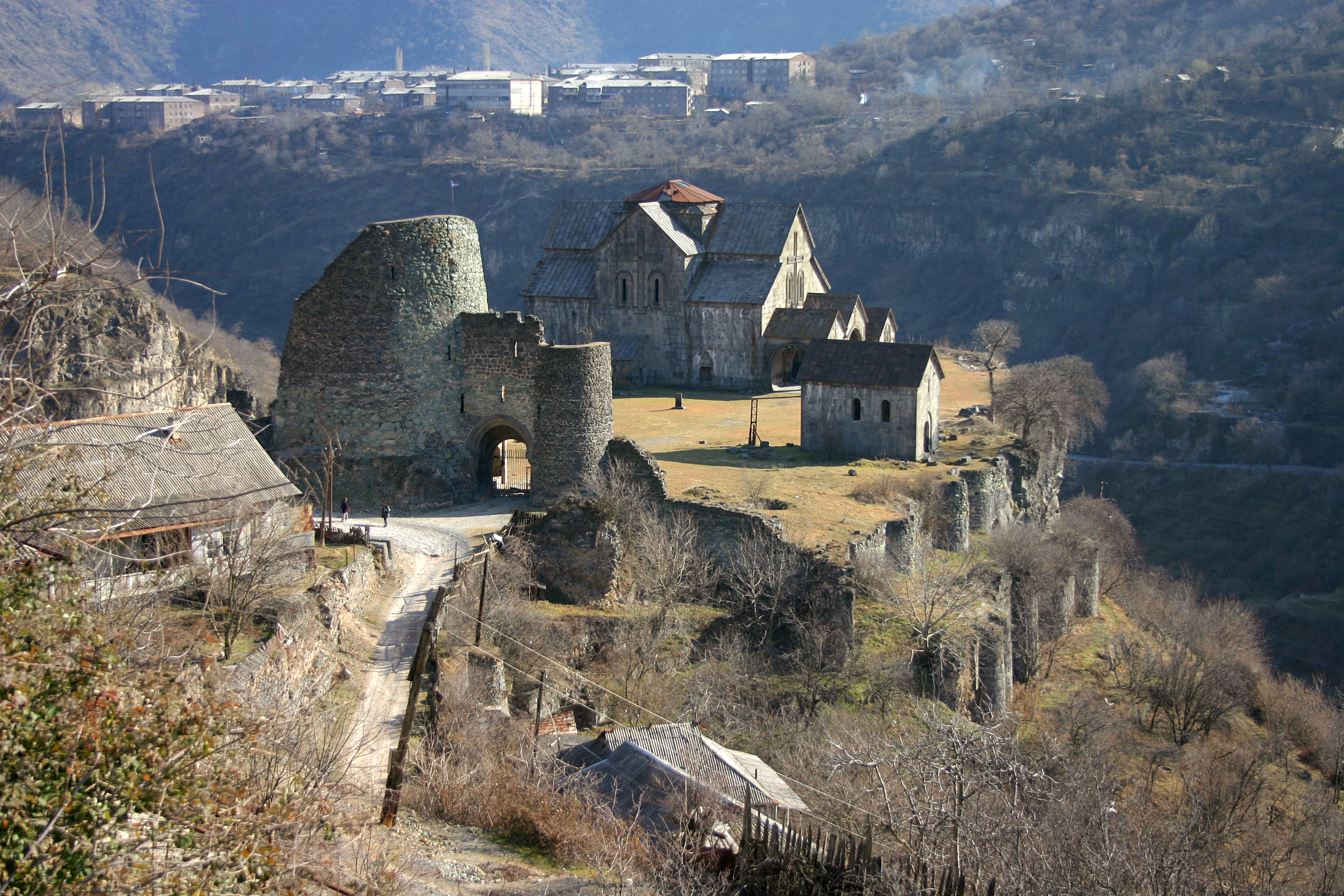
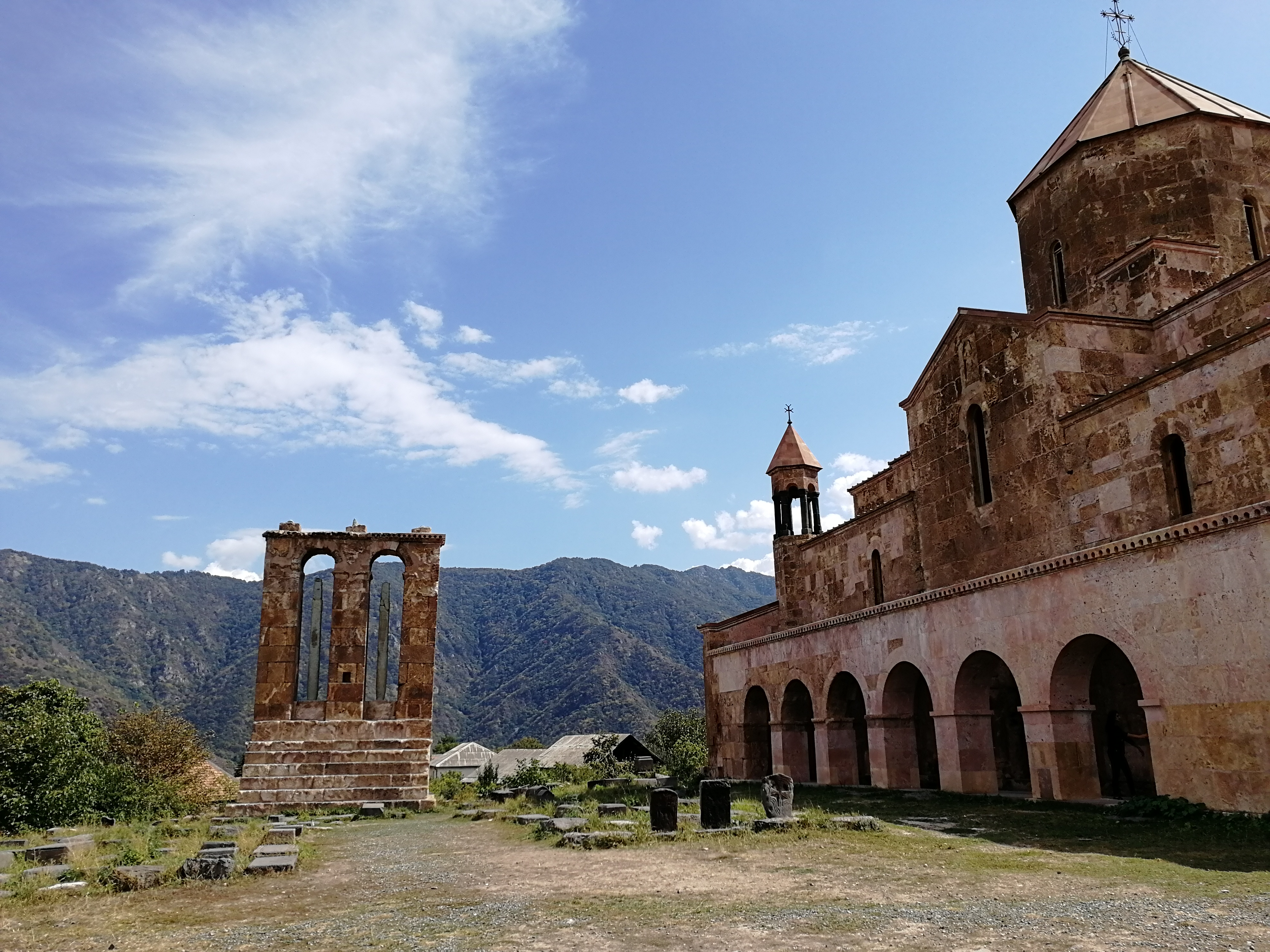
- From the top to bottom-right: View of Hnevank Monastery, Lake Tsover, Sanahin Bridge, Akhtala Monastery, Odzun Church

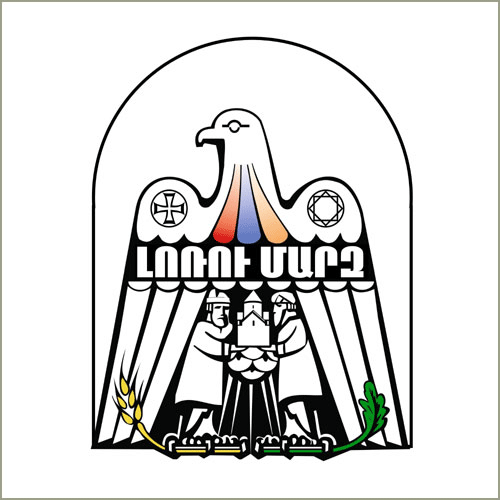
- Coat of arms

- Location of Lori within Armenia
- Coordinates: 40°55′N 44°30′E
- Country: Armenia
- Capital and largest city: Vanadzor

Government
  - Governor: Aren Mkrtchyan

Area
  - Total: 3,799 km^{2} (1,467 sq mi)
  - Rank: 3rd

Population (2022)
  - Total: 222,805
  - Estimate (1 January 2019): 215,500
  - Rank: 6th
  - Density: 58.65/km^{2} (151.9/sq mi)

GDP
  - Total: ֏ 276.931 billion (US$ 574 million)
  - Per capita: ֏ 1,263,372 (US$ 2,619)
- Time zone: AMT (UTC+04)
- Postal code: 1701–2117
- ISO 3166 code: AM.LO
- FIPS 10-4: AM06
- HDI (2022): 0.765 high · 8th
- Website: Official website

Lori (Armenian: Լոռի, Armenian pronunciation: [lɔˈri]) is a province (marz) of Armenia. It is located in the north of the country, bordering Georgia. Vanadzor is the capital and largest city of the province. Other important towns include Stepanavan, Alaverdi, and Spitak. It is home to the UNESCO World Heritage Sites of Haghpat and Sanahin monasteries and the well-preserved Akhtala monastery.

The province was heavily damaged during the 1988 Armenian earthquake.

The province is served by the Stepanavan Airport.

== Etymology ==
The name Lori (Լոռի) is of Armenian origin (from Armenian "quail"), and first appeared in the 11th century when King David I Anhoghin founded the fortified city of Lori. The fortress-city became the capital of the Kingdom of Tashir-Dzoraget in 1065. The name Lori later spread through the region and replaced the original name of Tashir.

== Geography ==
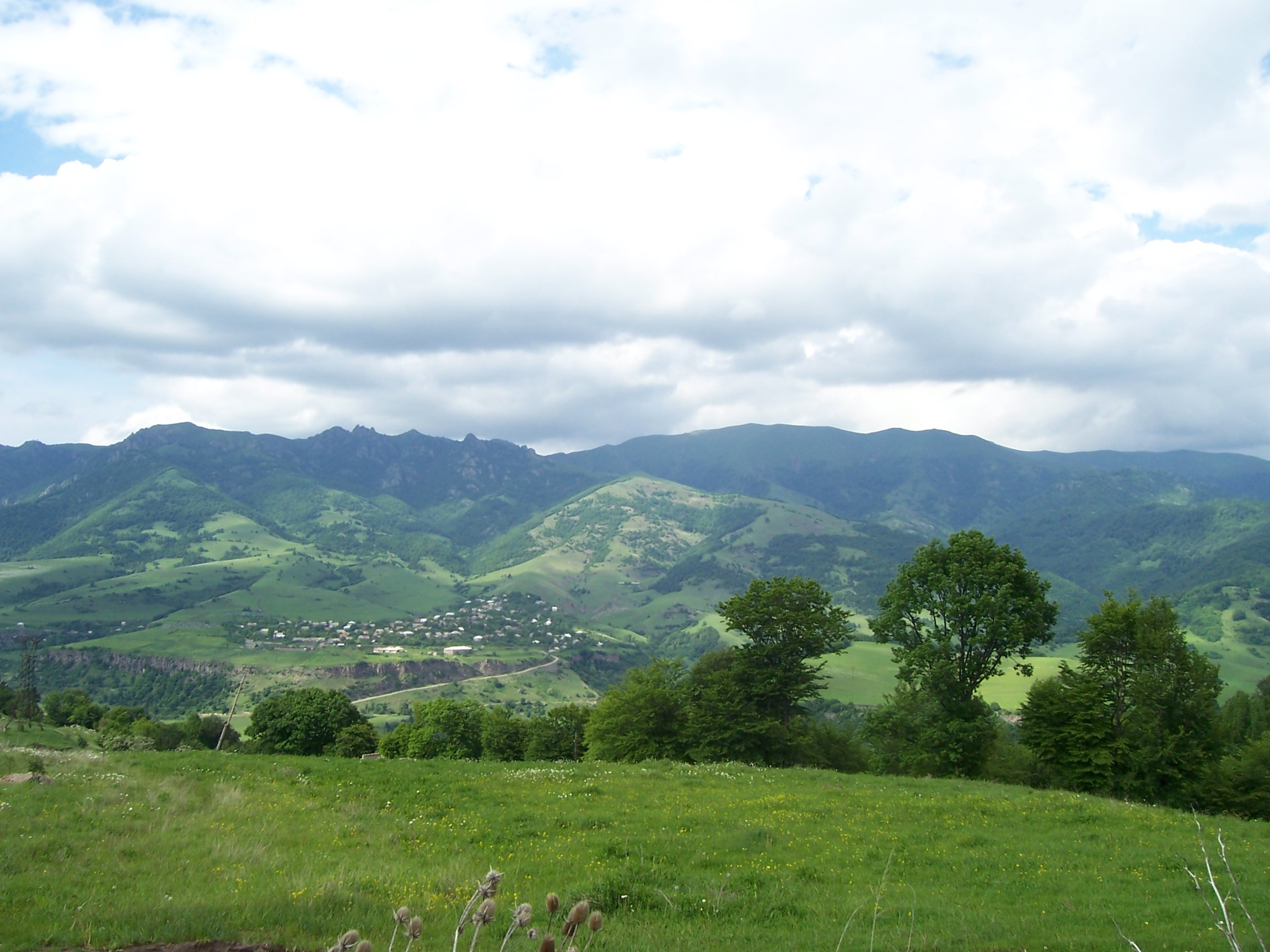
Pambak mountains and Dsegh village

Situated at the north of modern-day Armenia, Lori covers an area of 3,789 square kilometres (1,463 sq mi) (12.7% of total area of Armenia). It is bordered by Tavush Province from the east, Kotayk Province from the southeast, Aragatsotn Province from the southwest and Shirak Province from the west. The province is bordered by the Kvemo Kartli region of Georgia.

Historically, the territories of modern-day Lori are associated with the cantons of Tashir, Boghnopor and Dzorapor of Gugark province of Ancient Armenia.

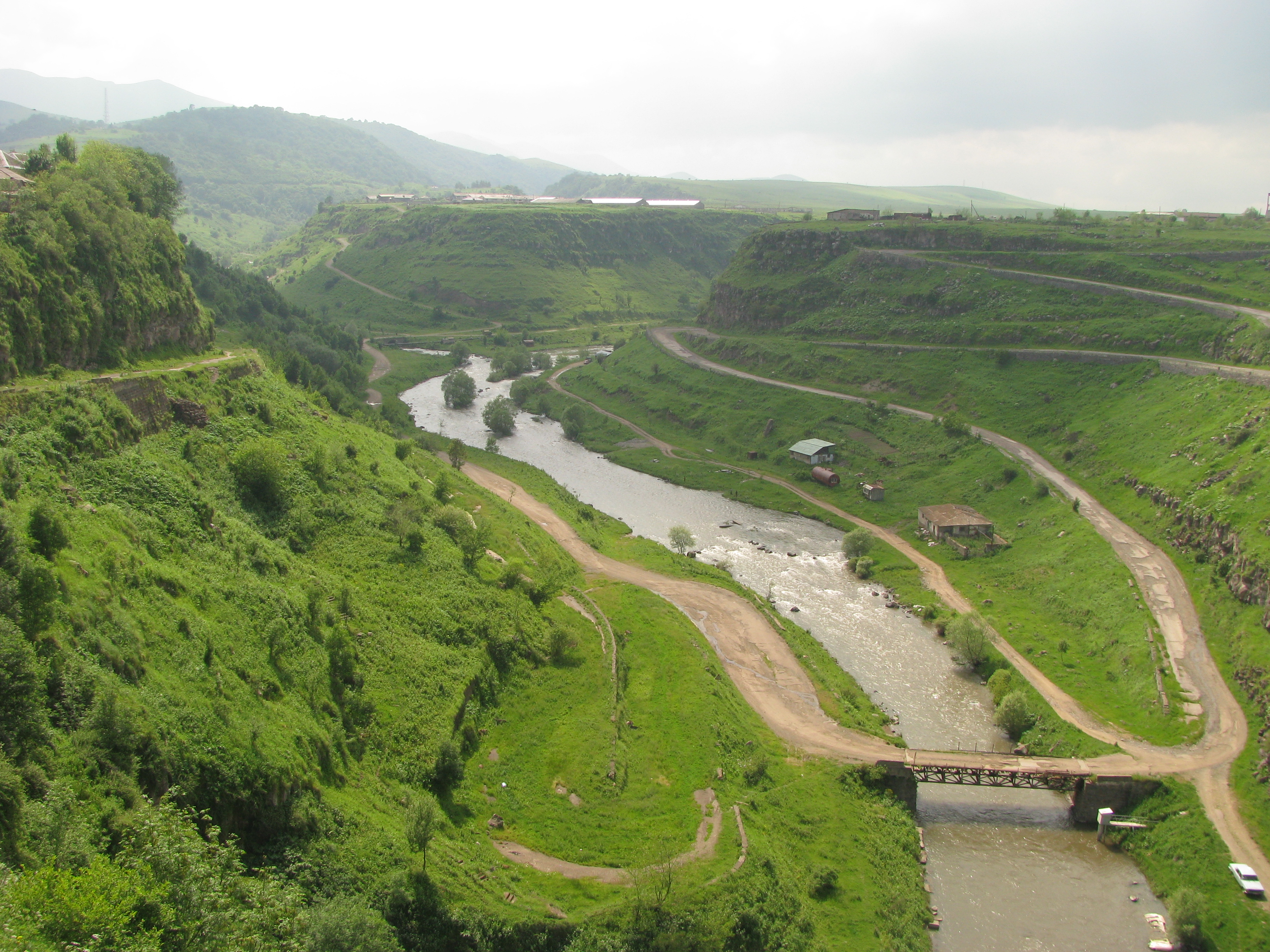
Dzoraget River

Lori is a mountainous region, dominated by the ranges of Javakheti, Bazum, Pambak, Gugark, Halab and Somkheti. The highest point of the province is Mount Achkasar of the Javakheti range with a height of 3196 meters. The lowest point is 380 meters in the valley of Debed in the northeast of the province.

The main water resource of the province is the Debed river with its tributaries Dzoraget, Pambak and Martsaget.

The climate is characterized with extremely cold snowy winters and mild summers. The annual precipitation level is between 600 and 700 mm (24 and 28 in).

== History ==
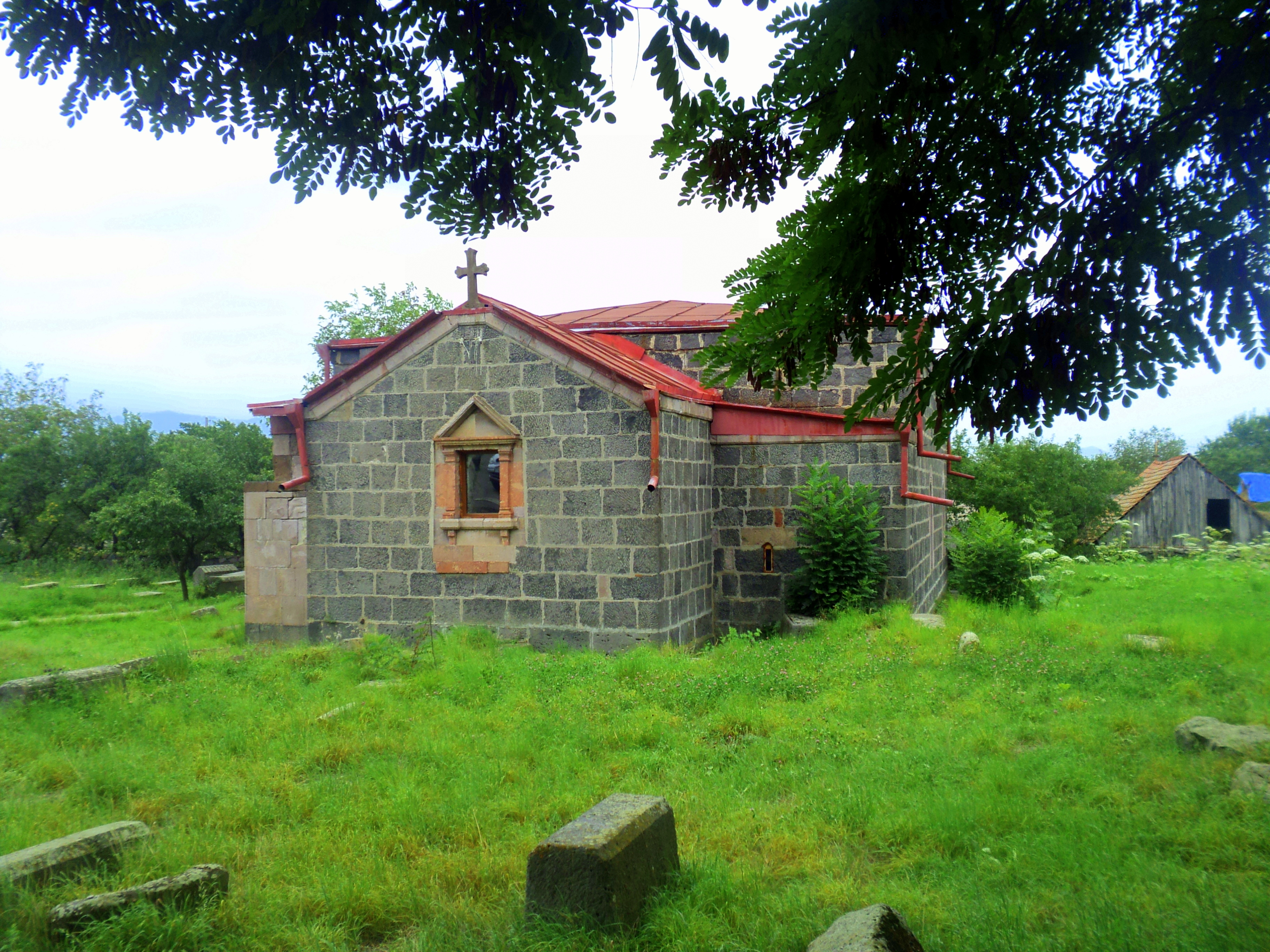
The 7th-century Saint Gregory Church of Dsegh

Excavations conducted in 1931 testify that the region of modern-day Lori was most probably settled during the 1st half of the 2nd millennium BC. After the Achaemenid invasion, the region became part of the 18th Satrapy of Persia. The region became a part of the nascent eastern Georgian state, the Kingdom of Iberia. After the establishment of the Kingdom of armenia, king Artaxias I and Zariadres jointly conquered the region from the kingdom of Iberia in the early 2nd century BC, making it a part of the 13th province of armenia, Gugark. The region was brought back into iberian control in the 1st century AD after Pharasmanes I was gifted armenian occupied iberian territories in exchange of installing a roman puppet on the Armenian throne. In the course of the 4th century, the region was ruled by members of the House of Mihran.

Following the partition of Armenia in 387 between the Byzantine Empire and Sassanid Persia, and the subsequent collapse of Arsacid Armenia in 428, Eastern Armenia including Gugark province became under the rule of Sassanid Persia. In 658, Armenia was conquered by the Arab invaders. At the end of the 9th century, most of the Gugark province became part of the newly established Bagratid Kingdom of Armenia. In 979, King Kiurike I founded the Kingdom of Tashir-Dzoraget under the rule of the Kiurikian dynasty and the protectorate of the Bagratid kings of Armenia. The capital of the kingdom was Matsnaberd (until 1065) and the Lori fortress. The Kiurikians ruled the kingdom until 1118 when Tashir-Dzoraget became part of the Kingdom of Georgia.

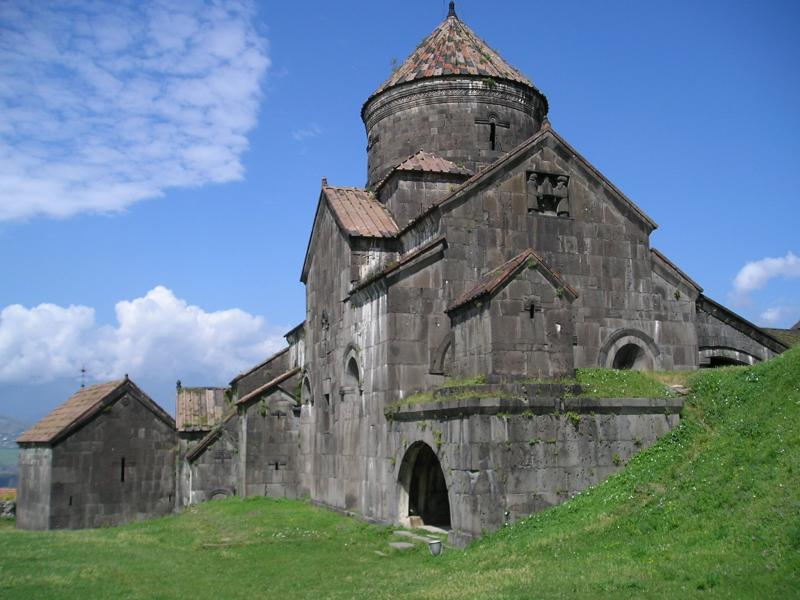
Surp Nshan church at the Haghpat Monastery, 10th century

The Seljuks invaded the region in the early 12th century, but their rule did not last long and in 1118–1122 the Georgian king David the Builder conquered Lori and granted the rule to the House of Orbeli. The Orbeli's revolted unsuccessfully in 1177, after which a Kipchak named Kubasar was appointed spasalari of Lori. Later in 1185, the province became ruled by the Mkhargdzeli dynasty after Queen Tamar of Georgia appointed the Sargis Mkhargrdzeli as its governor. However, the region was devastated by the Mongol invasion of 1236, and the Zakarian dynasty declined by the 2nd half of the 14th century. After fall of the Kingdom of Georgia in 1490, Lori remained part of Kingdom of Kartli until the 16th century.

Lori was annexed by Safavid Persia as a result of the 1555 Peace of Amasya and became part of Persia's Kartli-Kakheti province. After Nader Shah's murder in 1747, the Georgian kingdoms of Kartli and Kakheti became independent and united into a single kingdom by 1762. King Heraclius og Georgia invited armenians to settle in the depopulated region, because of which its population became dominated by Armenians.

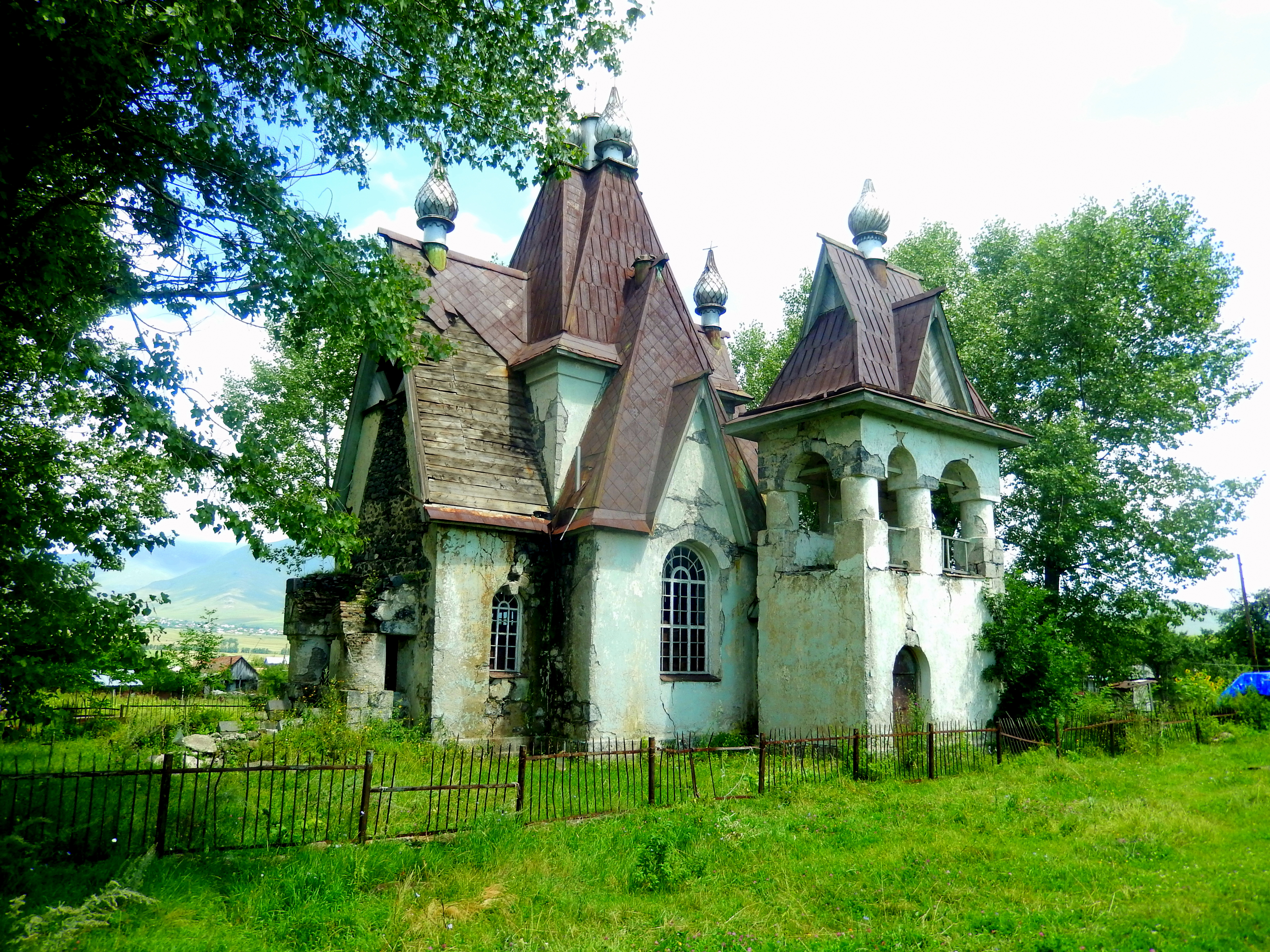
Saint Nikolai the Wonderworker, a Russian church in Amrakits, built in 1848

In 1800–01, together with the Georgian provinces of Kartli and Kakheti, Lori and Tavush were annexed by the Russian Empire to become part of the Georgia Governorate. Lori became officially part of the Russian Empire at the Treaty of Gulistan signed on 1 January 1813, between Imperial Russia and Qajar Persia, following the Russo-Persian War of 1804–13.

In 1862, Lori was transferred into the jurisdiction of the Tiflis Governorate. In 1880, Lori became part of the Borchali uyezd of the Tiflis Governorate. In the early 20th century, Lori was mostly populated by Armenians, with several Russian and Greek villages. In May 1918, the Ottoman Turkish forces moved towards Yerevan and Karakilisa (now Vanadzor). On 25 May 1918, the Armenians led by Garegin Nzhdeh fought against the Turkish forces led by Wehib Pasha, at the vicinity of Karakilisa. On 28 May 1918, the Turks retreated from Karakalisa, Abaran and Sardarabad, paving way towards the declaration of the Republic of Armenia on the same day.

In late 1918, Armenia and Georgia fought a border war over Lori. Lori was claimed by both countries after 1918, when each declared its independence from Russian empire. Initially, Georgia controlled Lori. After turning down Armenian ultimatum, Georgian forces were attacked by Armenians and pushed back to river Khrami. Georgians consolidated and counterattacked, pushing Armenian forces out of the contested area. In January 1919, the British brokered a peace agreement which left northern Lori as a neutral zone between the two countries. Once the British had left the region and the Caucasus as a whole, Armenian forces took control over the region. When Armenia was invaded by Turkish forces in November 1920, Georgia occupied the whole province, with permission by the Armenian government. Following Armenia's Sovietization in December 1920, Lori was incorporated into Soviet Armenia on 6 November 1921.

During the Soviet period, modern-day Lori was divided into the raions of Kalinino, Tumanyan (Alaverdi until 1969), Kirovakan, Aragats, Spitak and Stepanavan. After the independence of Armenia, the 6 raions were merged as per the 1995 administrative reform, to form the Lori Province.

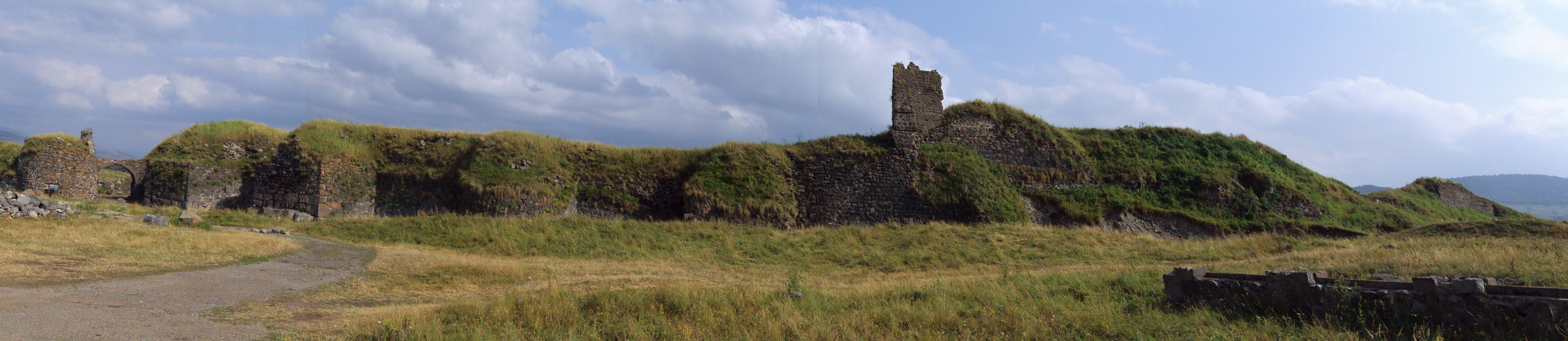
Lori, the capital of the Kingdom of Tashir-Dzoraget

== Demographics ==
=== Population ===
According to the 1989 Soviet census, the Lori Province (then part of the Gugark, Tashir, Spitak, Stepanavan, and Tumanyan districts in 1930–1995) had a population of 229,459. 116,180 or 50.63% of which was urban, distributed in the cities of Alaverdi (26,930), Kirovakan (75,616), Spitak (3,740) and Stepanavan (9,894), and 113,279 or 49.37% were rural, distributed in the districts of Gugark (20,368), Tashir (30,645), Spitak (8,613), Stepanavan (17,474), and Tumanyan (36,179).

According to the 2011 official census, Lori has a population of 235,537 (111,675 men and 123,862 women), forming around 7.8% of the entire population of Armenia. The urban population is 137,784 (58.5%) and the rural is 97,753 (41.5%). The province has 8 urban and 105 rural communities. The largest urban community is the provincial center of Vanadzor, with a population of 86,199. The other urban centres are Alaverdi, Stepanavan, Spitak, Shamlugh, Tashir, Akhtala and Tumanyan.

With a population of 4,578, the village of Metsavan is the largest rural municipality of Lori.

=== Ethnic groups and religion ===
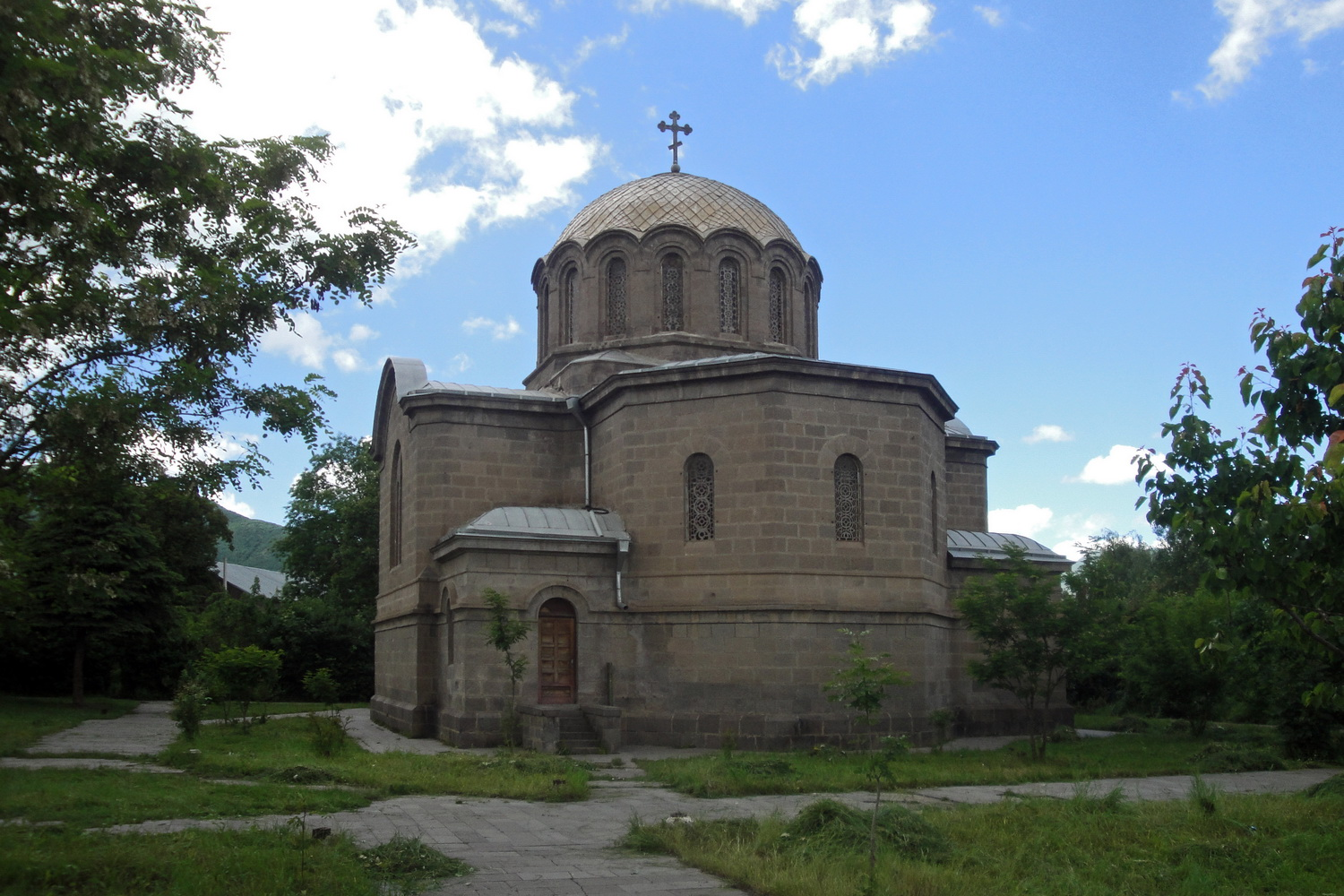
The Russian church in Vanadzor

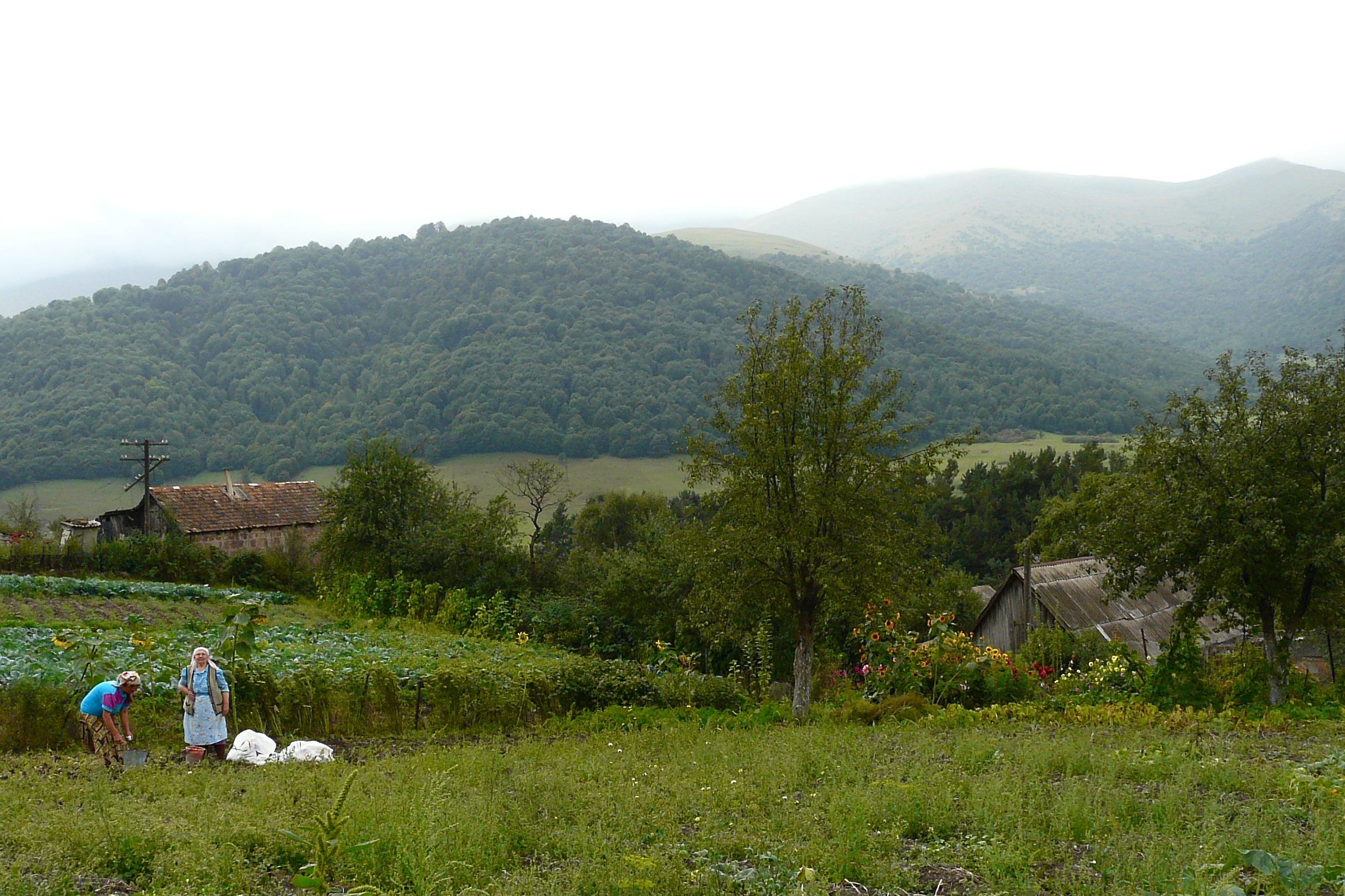
Fioletovo is mostly populated by Spiritual Christians from Russia

The majority of Lori are ethnic Armenians who belong to the Armenian Apostolic Church. The regulating body of the church is the Diocese of Gougark, headed by Archbishop Sebouh Chouldjian. The Saint Gregory of Narek Cathedral in Vanadzor is the seat of the diocese.

However, small communities of Spiritual Christians from Russia are mainly found in the villages of Fioletovo and Lermontovo, and in less numbers in the villages of Sverdlov, Mikhayelovka, Privolnoye, Pushkino, Medovka and the town of Tashir. The total number of Spiritual Christians from Russia in Lori is about 3,882 individuals. There are few Orthodox Russians and Ukrainians in Vanadzor, Stepanavan and the village of Amrakits.

According to the Diocese of Gougark, as of February 2016, Lori is home to 259 places of worship, of which 3 monasteries, as well as 36 churches and 23 chapels, are active.

The 793 individuals of the Yazidi community are found in the southern villages of the province including Lermontovo and Lernantsk.

Lori is also home to a tiny Greek community of 655 individuals who speak the Pontic dialect. Small Greek communities could be found in the towns of Alaverdi, Akhtala, Stepanavan, Noyemberyan and Vanadzor. The majority of the Yaghdan village is Greek.

== Administrative divisions ==
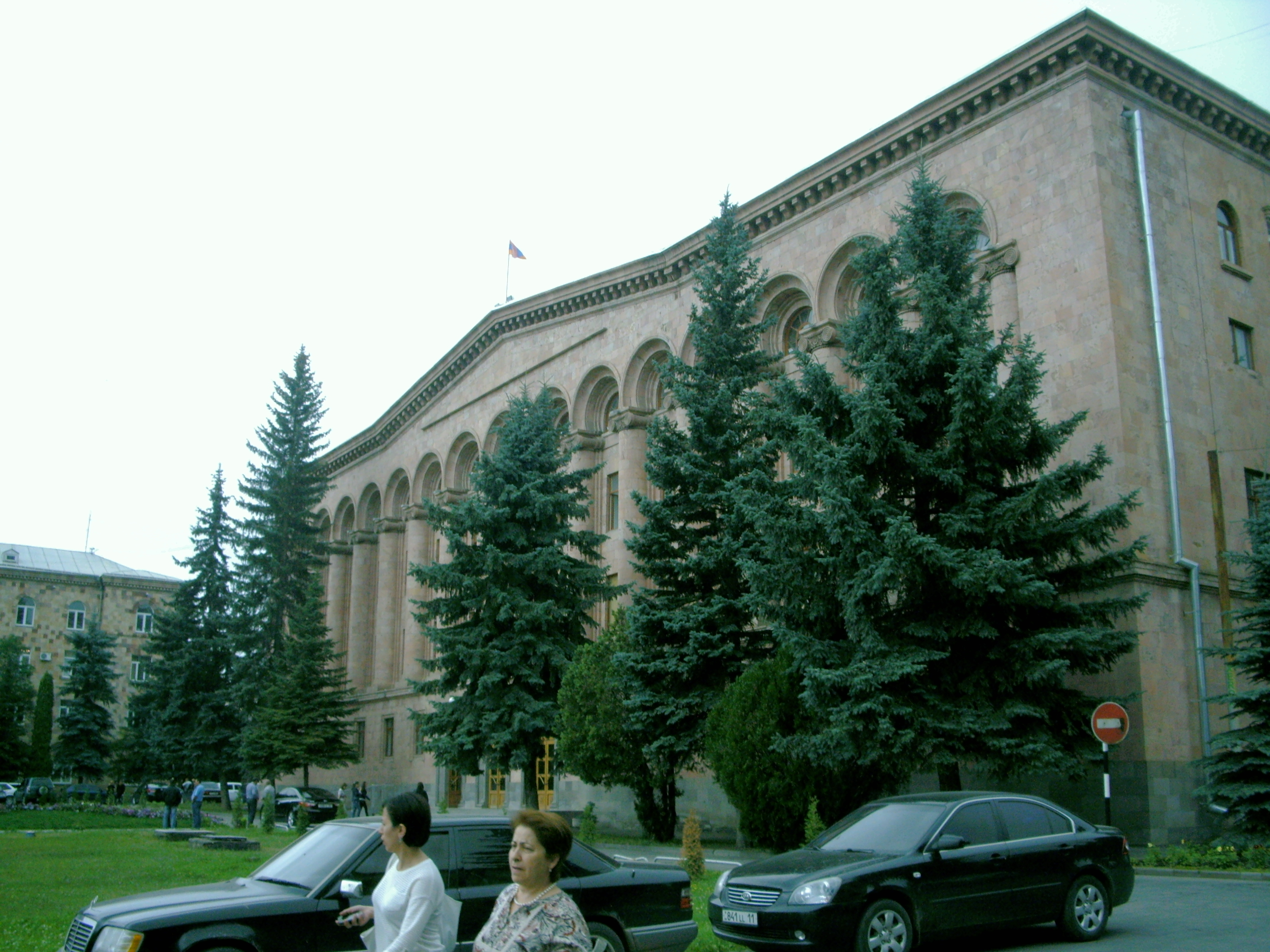
Lori Province administration in Vanadzor

As a result of the administrative reforms in November 2017, Lori is currently divided into 57 municipal communities (hamaynkner), of which seven are urban and 50 are rural:

Municipality	Type	Area (km^{2})	Population (2022 census)	Centre	Included villages
Akhtala Municipality	Urban			Akhtala	Akhtala aroghjaranin kits, Bendik, Chochkan, Mets Ayrum, Neghots, Pokr Ayrum, Shamlugh, Verin Akhtala
Alaverdi Municipality	Urban		32,899	Alaverdi	Akner, Akori, Jiliza, Kachachkut, Haghpat, Tsaghkashat
Spitak Municipality	Urban	5.5	38,037	Spitak	
Stepanavan Municipality	Urban	14	13,349	Stepanavan	Armanis, Katnaghbyur, Urasar
Tashir Municipality	Urban		21,472	Tashir	Blagodarnoye, Dashtadem, Getavan, Katnarat, Kruglaya Shishka, Lernahovit, Medovka, Meghvahovit, Noramut, Novoseltsovo, Saratovka
Tumanyan Municipality	Urban		5,611	Tumanyan	Kober kayaran, Shamut, Lorut, Ahnidzor, Atan, Marts, Karinj
Vanadzor Municipality	Urban	32	84,552	Vanadzor	
Antaramut Municipality	Rural			Antaramut	
Antarashen Municipality	Rural			Antarashen	
Arevashogh Municipality	Rural			Arevashogh	
Arjut Municipality	Rural			Arjut	Arjut kayaranin kits
Aznvadzor Municipality	Rural			Aznvadzor	
Bazum Municipality	Rural			Bazum	
Chkalov Municipality	Rural			Chkalov	
Darpas Municipality	Rural			Darpas	
Debet Municipality	Rural			Debet	
Dsegh Municipality	Rural			Dsegh	
Dzoraget Municipality	Rural			Dzoraget	
Dzoragyugh Municipality	Rural			Dzoragyugh	
Fioletovo Municipality	Rural		1,205	Fioletovo	
Geghasar Municipality	Rural			Geghasar	
Ghursali Municipality	Rural			Ghursali	
Gogaran Municipality	Rural			Gogaran	
Gugark Municipality	Rural			Gugark	
Gyulagarak Municipality	Rural		7,613	Gyulagarak	Amrakits, Gargar, Hobardzi, Kurtan, Pushkino, Vardablur
Halavar Municipality	Rural			Halavar	Haydarli, Kilisa
Hartagyugh Municipality	Rural			Hartagyugh	
Jrashen Municipality	Rural			Jrashen	
Karaberd Municipality	Rural			Karaberd	
Karadzor Municipality	Rural			Karadzor	
Katnajur Municipality	Rural			Katnajur	
Khnkoyan Municipality	Rural			Khnkoyan	
Lermontovo Municipality	Rural		911	Lermontovo	
Lernantsk Municipality	Rural			Lernantsk	
Lernapat Municipality	Rural			Lernapat	
Lernavan Municipality	Rural			Lernavan	
Lori Berd Municipality	Rural		5,044	Lori Berd	Agarak, Bovadzor, Hovnanadzor, Koghes, Lejan, Sverdlov, Urut, Yaghdan
Lusaghbyur Municipality	Rural			Lusaghbyur	
Margahovit Municipality	Rural			Margahovit	
Mets Parni Municipality	Rural			Mets Parni	
Metsavan Municipality	Rural			Metsavan	Dzyunashogh, Mikhayelovka, Paghaghbyur
Nor Khachakap Municipality	Rural			Nor Khachakap	
Norashen Municipality	Rural			Norashen	
Odzun Municipality	Rural			Odzun	Amoj, Ardvi, Arevatsag, Aygehat, Hagvi, Karmir Aghek, Mghart, Tsater
Pambak Municipality	Rural		12,112	Pambak	Pambak kayaranin kits
Sarahart Municipality	Rural			Sarahart	
Saralanj Municipality	Rural			Saralanj	
Saramej Municipality	Rural			Saramej	
Sarchapet Municipality	Rural			Sarchapet	Apaven, Artsni, Dzoramut, Gogavan, Petrovka, Privolnoye
Shahumyan Municipality	Rural			Shahumyan	
Shenavan Municipality	Rural			Shenavan	
Shirakamut Municipality	Rural			Shirakamut	
Shnogh Municipality	Rural			Shnogh	Karkop, Teghut
Tsaghkaber Municipality	Rural			Tsaghkaber	
Vahagnadzor Municipality	Rural			Vahagnadzor	
Vahagni Municipality	Rural			Vahagni	
Yeghegnut Municipality	Rural			Yeghegnut	

During the recent years, many rural settlements in Lori became abandoned, including the villages of Gyulludara, Kizilshafak, and Kizkala.

== Culture ==
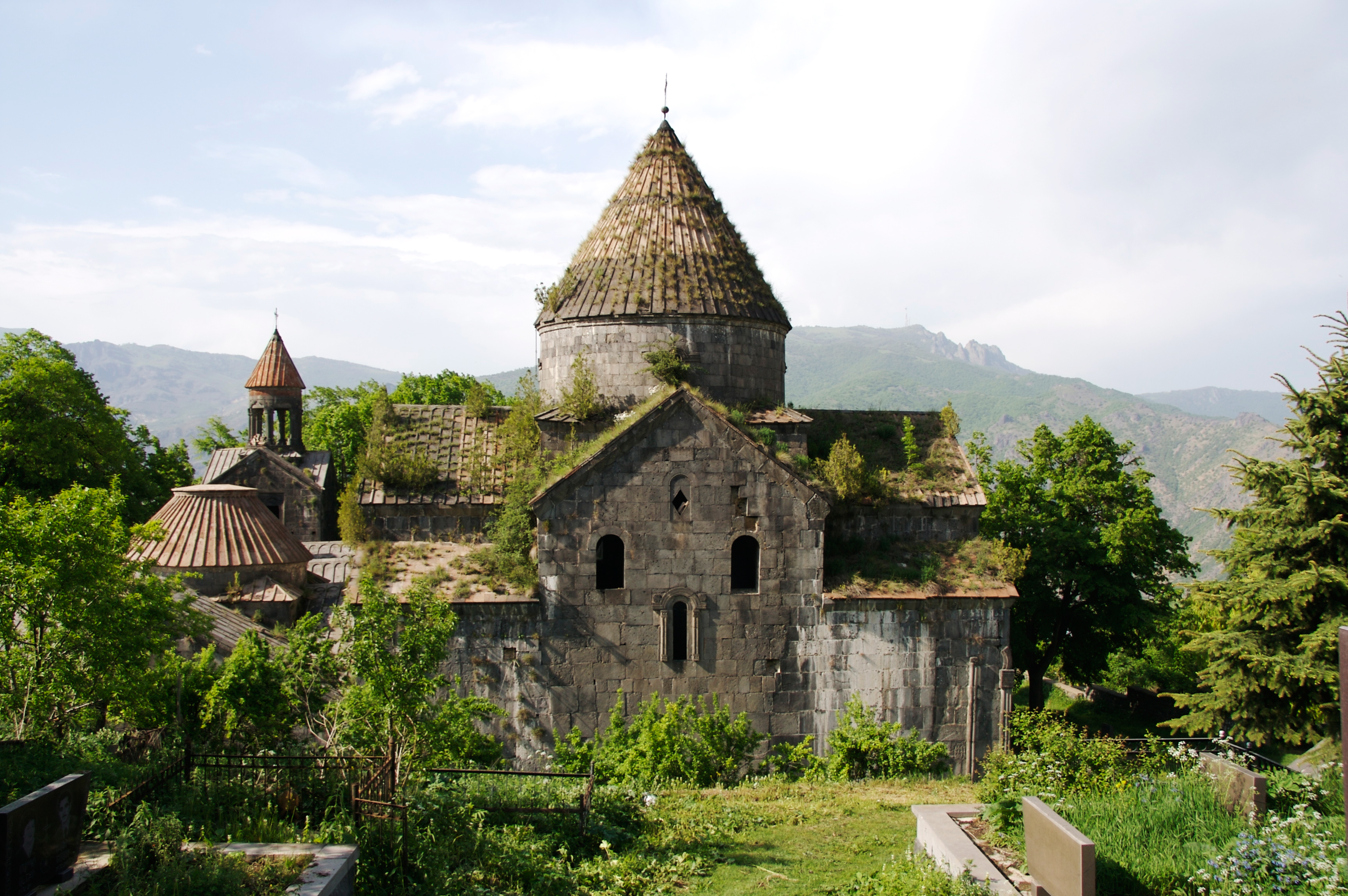
Sanahin Monastery

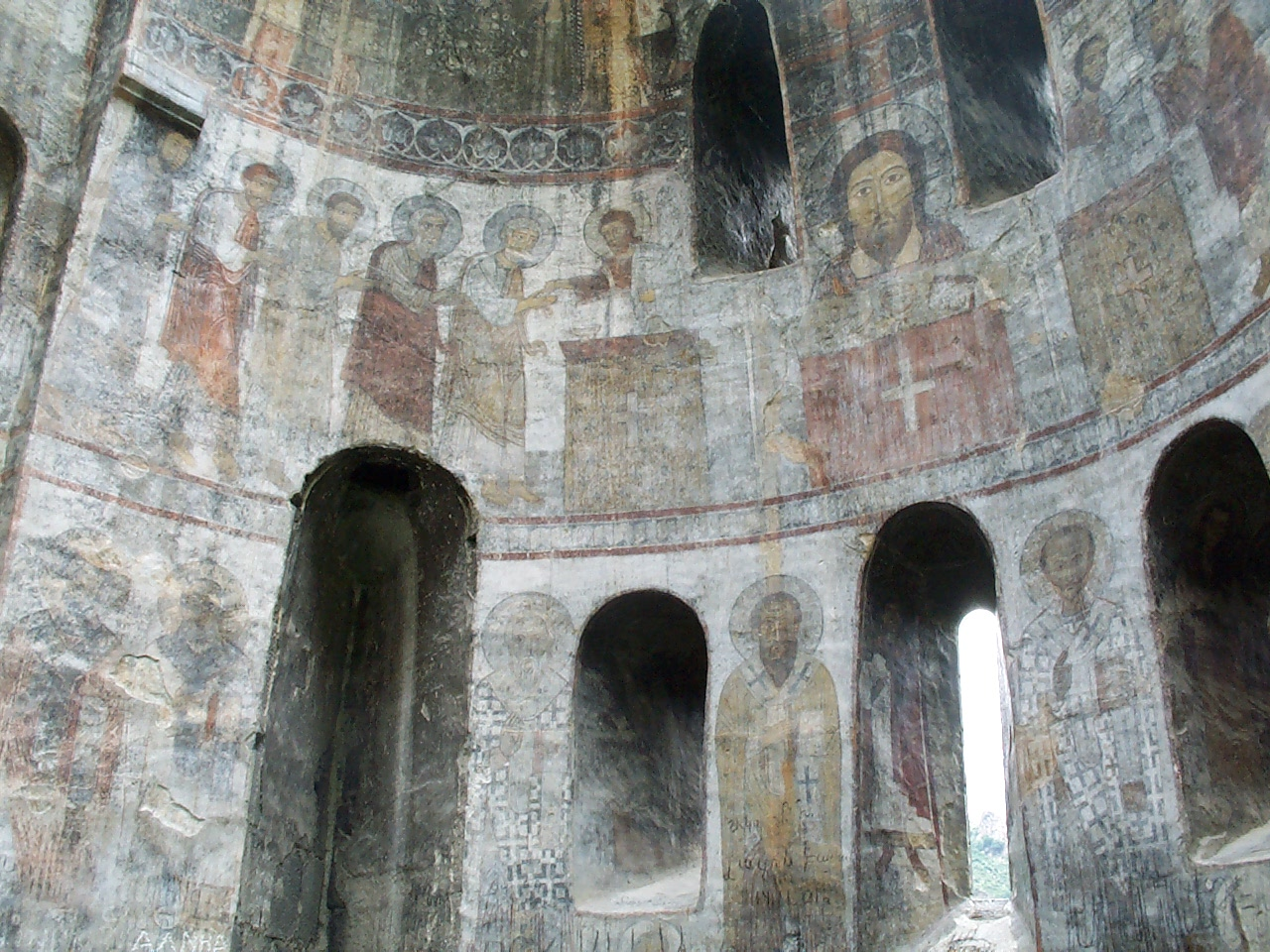
Kobayr Monastery Frescoes

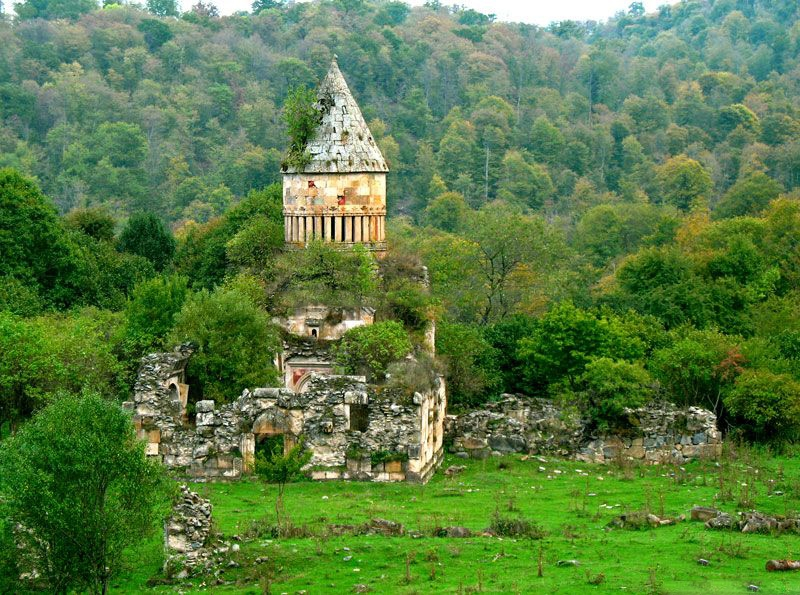
Khorakert Monastery

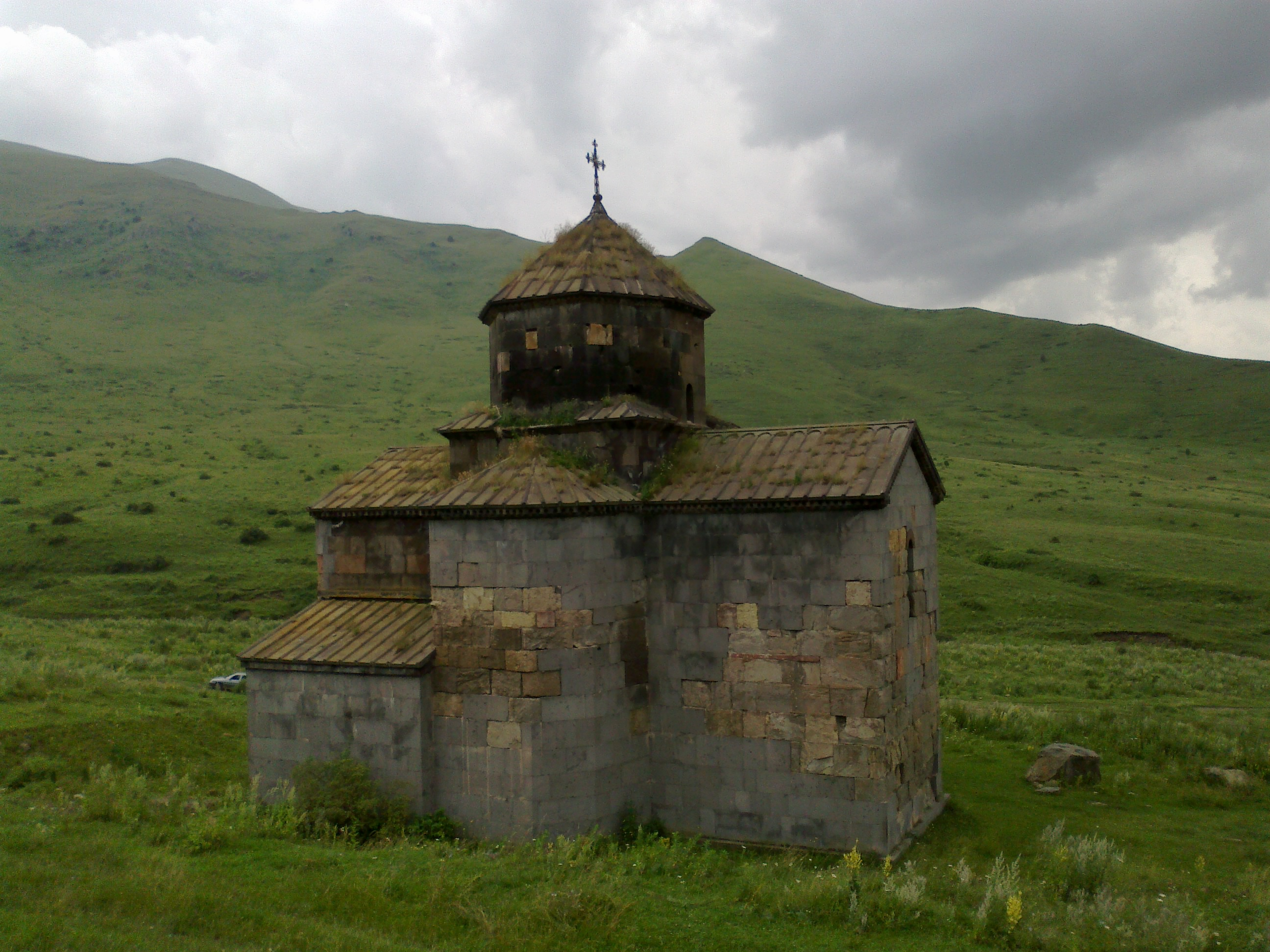
Saint George Church of Sverdlov

Between the 11th and 13th centuries, the monasteries of Haghpat, Sanahin, Kobayr and Bardzrakash in Dsegh served as centers of Armenian culture, theology and science. Scholars such as Hovhannes Imastaser, Grigor Tuteordi, Davit Kobayretsi, and Grigor Magistros worked in these monasteries. The House-museum of Hovhannes Tumanyan in Dsegh is among the notable cultural structures in Lori.

=== Fortresses and archaeological sites ===
- Kaytson Castle of the 10th century
- Kayan Fortress of the 10th century
- Akhtala Fortress of the 10th century
- Lori Fortress of the 11th century
- Sanahin Bridge of 1195
- Yaghdan Bridge of the 13th century
- Sedvi Fortress of the 13th century

=== Churches and monasteries ===
- Odzun Church of the 5th century.
- Saint George Church of Sverdlov of the 6th century
- Horomayr Monastery of the 7th century near Odzun
- Saint Gregory the Illuminator's Church of Dsegh, 7th century
- Hnevank Monastery, 7th–12th centuries
- Surp Hovhannes Monastery of Ardvi, 8th–13th centuries
- Sanahin Monastery of the 10th century
- Haghpat Monastery of the 10th century
- Church of the Forty Martyrs of the 11th century
- Khorakert Monastery of 1251 in Jiliza
- Surp Nshan Monastery of Sedvi near Kachachkut of the 13th century
- Church of the Holy Mother of God of Vanadzor, opened in 1831
- Saint Nikolai the Wonderworker Russian Church of Amrakits, opened in 1848
- Gyulagarak church of 1876.
- Russian Church of the Nativity of Blessed Virgin Mary of Vanadzor, opened in 1895

== Transportation ==
Lori is connected to other parts of Armenia through a railway, national highways and a network of regional roads. The M-3 and M-6 highways passing through the province, connect the capital Yerevan with the Georgian capital Tbilisi. The M-8 highway connects Lori with Tavush Province to the east

The provincial centre Vanadzor has a railway station with a South Caucasus Railway express service that connects the city with Yerevan via Gyumri, and Tbilisi via Ayrum. In April 2012, a replacement bridge over the Zamarlu gorge just west of Vahagnadzor was opened in order to secure the safe ongoing use of the line to Ayrum, but not before the all station service between Gyumri and Ayrum was discontinued leaving the likes of Spitak and Alaverdi without a passenger service. A new railway link between Vanadzor and Fioletovo (west of Dilijan) has also been proposed.

Stepanavan Airport, located 44 km (27 mi) north of Vanadzor, is the nearest airport to the city.

== Economy ==
=== Agriculture ===
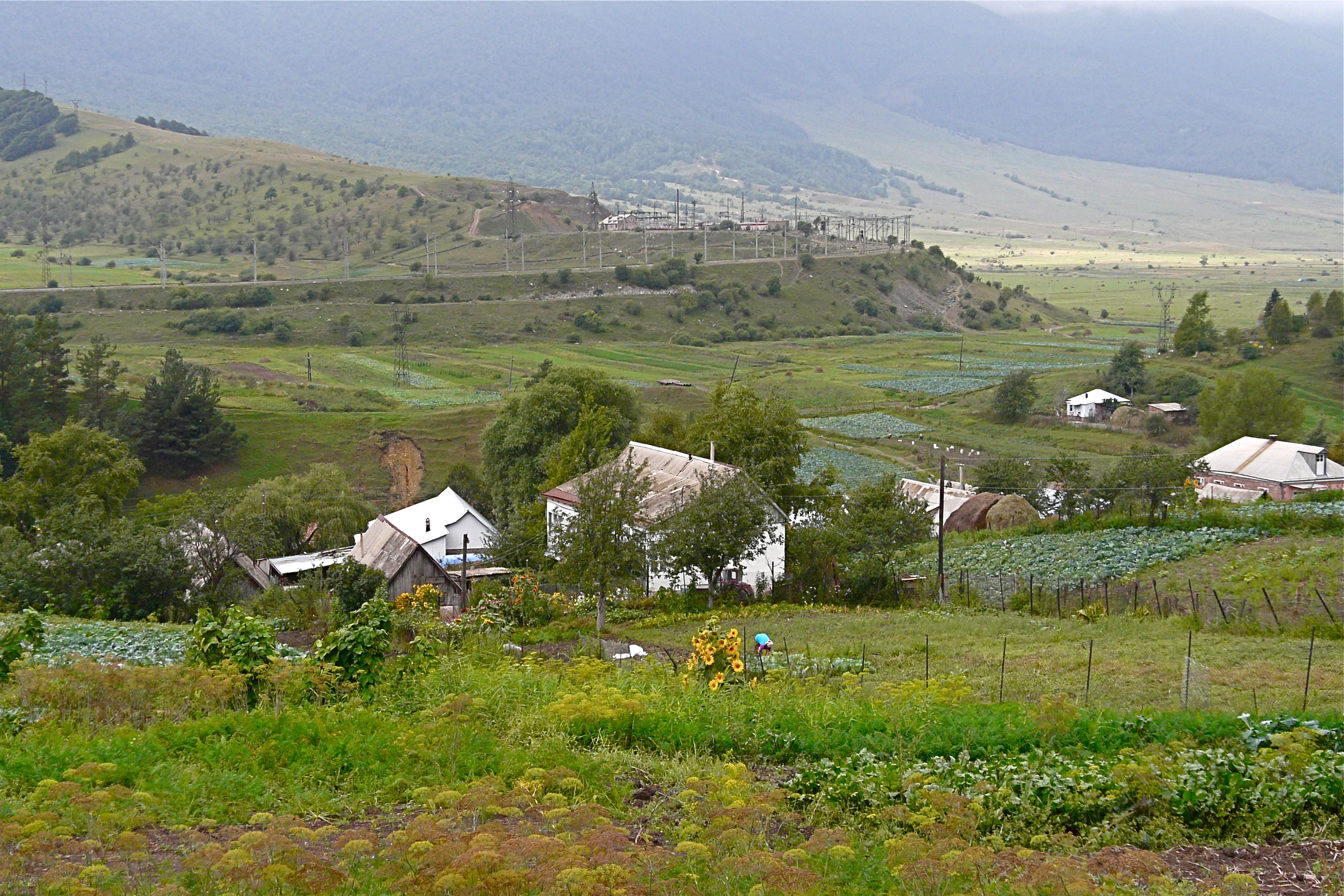
Farmlands in Lori

The agriculture of Lori forms around 7.5% of the annual total agricultural product of Armenia. Approximately, 40% of the population in Lori are involved in agricultural activities, including farming and cattle-breeding. Almost 66.3% (2,511.5 km^{2}) of the total area of the province are arable lands, out of which 17% (421 km^{2}) are ploughed. The main crops of the province are grains, followed by potato and vegetables. There is a large poultry farm in the town of Spitak.

=== Industry ===
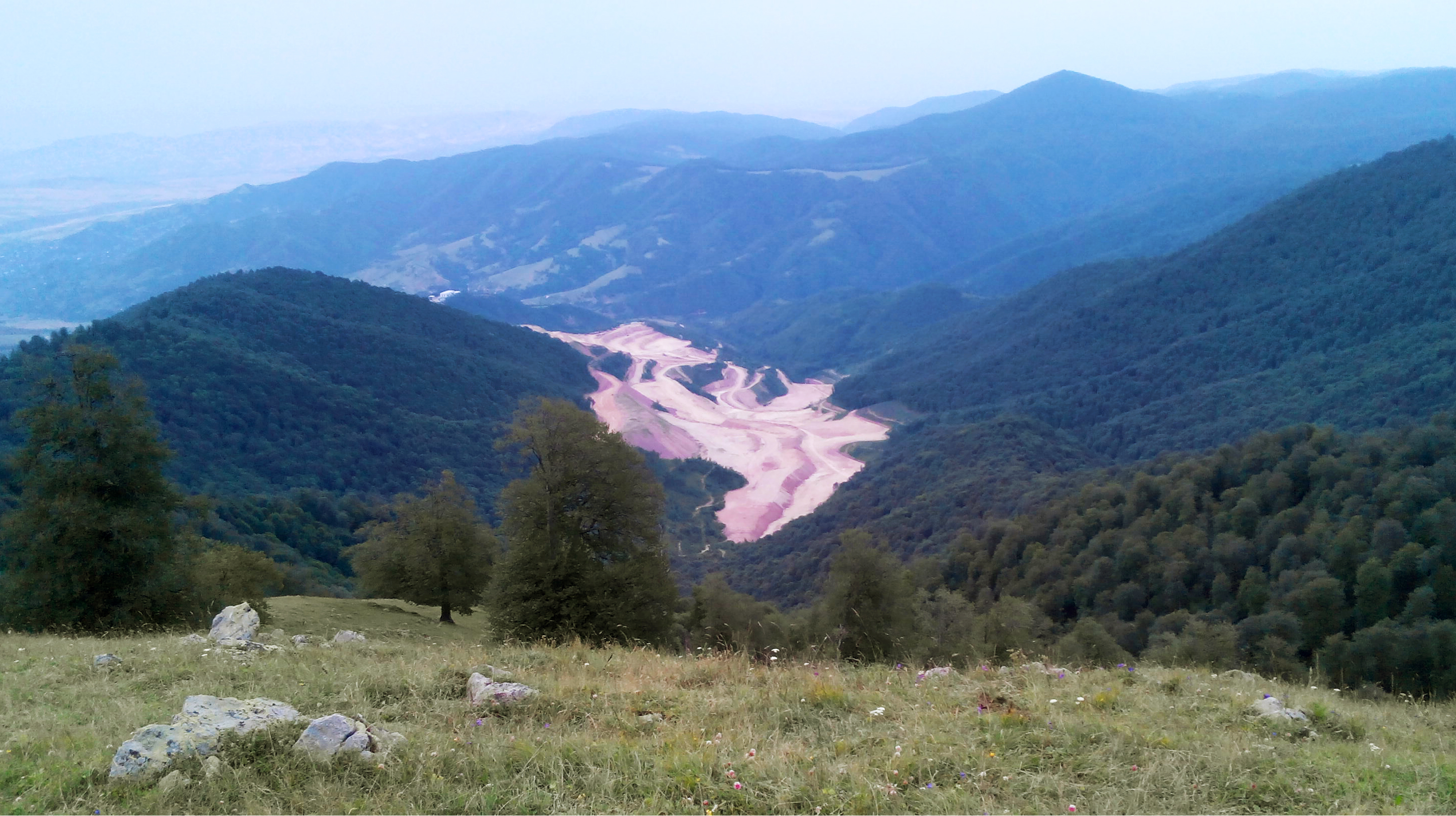
Teghut Mine

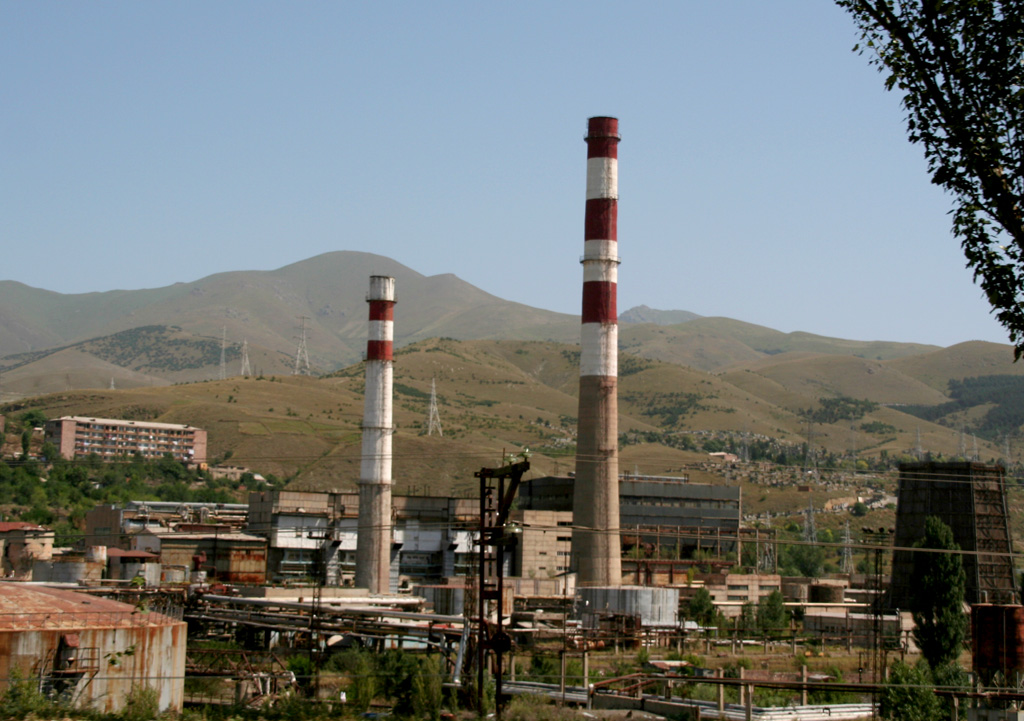
Industry in Vanadzor

As of 2016, the province has a contribution of around 6% in the annual total industrial product of Armenia. Lori is a major centre for metallurgical business, building materials production, as well as dairy products.

- The Alaverdi copper smelter owned the "Armenian Copper Programme" company is the only smelter in Lori that is still in operation since the Soviet days. The largest copper mines are located in Alaverdi, Akhtala, Shamlugh and Teghut.
- The city of Vanadzor is the main industrial centre of the province. The industry of the city is quite diversified with many firms specialized in garment manufacturing, chemical products, building materials, and dairy products. The largest garment manufacturers of the city are the "Dav-Gar" garment factory founded in 1962, the Darbbag's Sewing Factory founded in 1977 (privatized in 1996), the "Sarton" Sewing Factory founded in 1990, "Ruz-Dan" garment factory founded in 2000. The largest chemical plants of Vanadzor include the "Vanadzor ChimProm" founded in 1929, the "Gipk" enterprise for polymeric materials founded in 1967, and the "Gary Group" for polymeric materials founded in 1998. The "Beton" enterprise founded in 1988, the "Bionik" plant founded in 2004, and the "Karaberd" plant are specialized in building materials. The "DIET LLC", the "K&K" factory, and the "Katnagorts" plant are specialized in dairy products. Other major industrial plants of Vanadzor include the "Ardvin" electromechanical plant founded in 1956, the "Gems De Luxe" precious stone processing enterprise founded in 1996, and the "Jerutsogh" factory for heating equipments. The Vanadzor Thermal Power Plant is operating since 1961.
- The town of Spitak is home to the "Spitak-1" organization for construction and building materials founded in 1985, the "Sev Kakach" cooperative for bakery production founded in 1987, the "Bee Art" plant for honey, and the "Vanuhi" garment factory.
- Lori is famous for its cheese and other dairy products. The town Tashir is home to many firms for dairy products including the "Daughter Melania" cheese factory (since 1996, the "Dumikyan Brothers" cheese factory), the "Kalinino Kat" plant, and the "Tashir Kat" plant.
- Other notable industrial plants in Lori include the "Bhez-Plazma" Electrical Products Manufacturing Enterprise founded in 1960 in Stepanavan, the "Titanyan Brothers" plant for building materials founded in 1964 in Alaverdi, the "INSI-NTK" plant for cosmetics and perfumes founded in 2006 in Hobardz, the "Katnarat Dairy Factory" founded in 2009 in Katnarat, the "Tutyan" linseed oil manufacturing enterprise founded in 2010 in Hartagyugh, the "Grig Stone" mining and stone-processing plant in Stepanavan, the "Hoosh" stone-processing plant in Tashir, and the "Sanasar Janjughazyan" plant for carbonated soft drinks in Vardablur.

The Dzoraget Hydroelectric Power Station (Armenian: Ձորագետի հիդրոէլեկտրակայան) is located in the Dzoraget village of Lori, on the shores of Debed River. It is in operation since on 15 November 1932 with the full installed capacity of 22.32 MW. As of 1980, the plant uses three generators with an installed capacity of 26.2 MW. The Dzoraget Hydro Power Plant is considered to be small size power plant.

=== Tourism ===
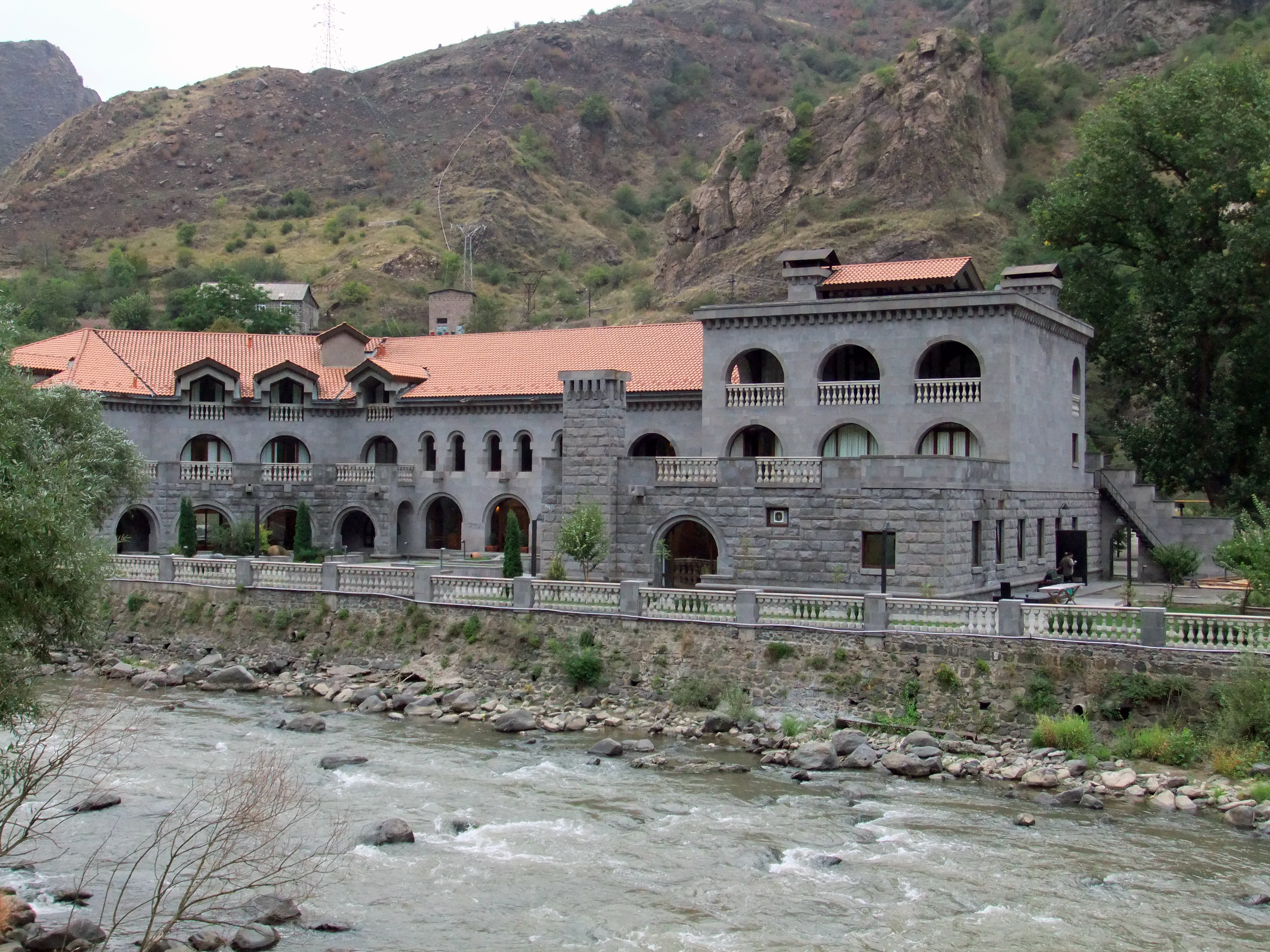
Avan Dzoraget Resort

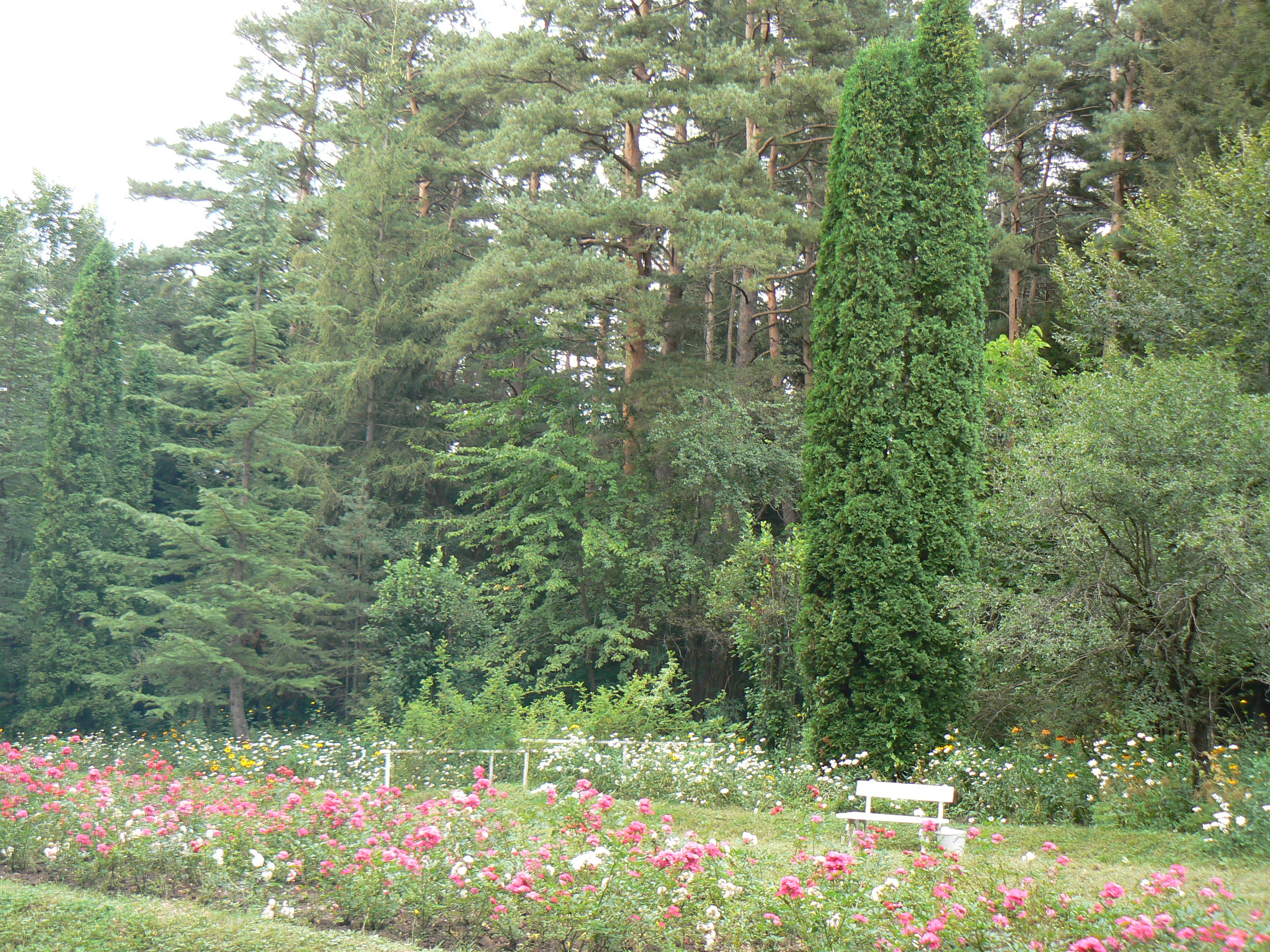
Stepanavan Dendropark

The mountainous nature, the mild summer climate and the green forests of Lori attract a large number of visitors during the summer season. Many sanatoriums, hotels, resorts and spas serve the province, mainly around Vanadzor, Stepanavan, Alaverdi, Dsegh and along the rivers of Dzoraget and Deped.

The Monasteries of Haghpat and Sanahin are a UNESCO World Heritage Site.

Lori has three nature protected areas, including the Gyulagarak Sanctuary, the Margahovit Sanctuary, and the Rhododendron caucasicum Sanctuary near Aghstev river.

The Stepanavan Dendropark as well as the Vanadzor Botanical Garden are major destinations for ecotourism lovers.

== Education ==
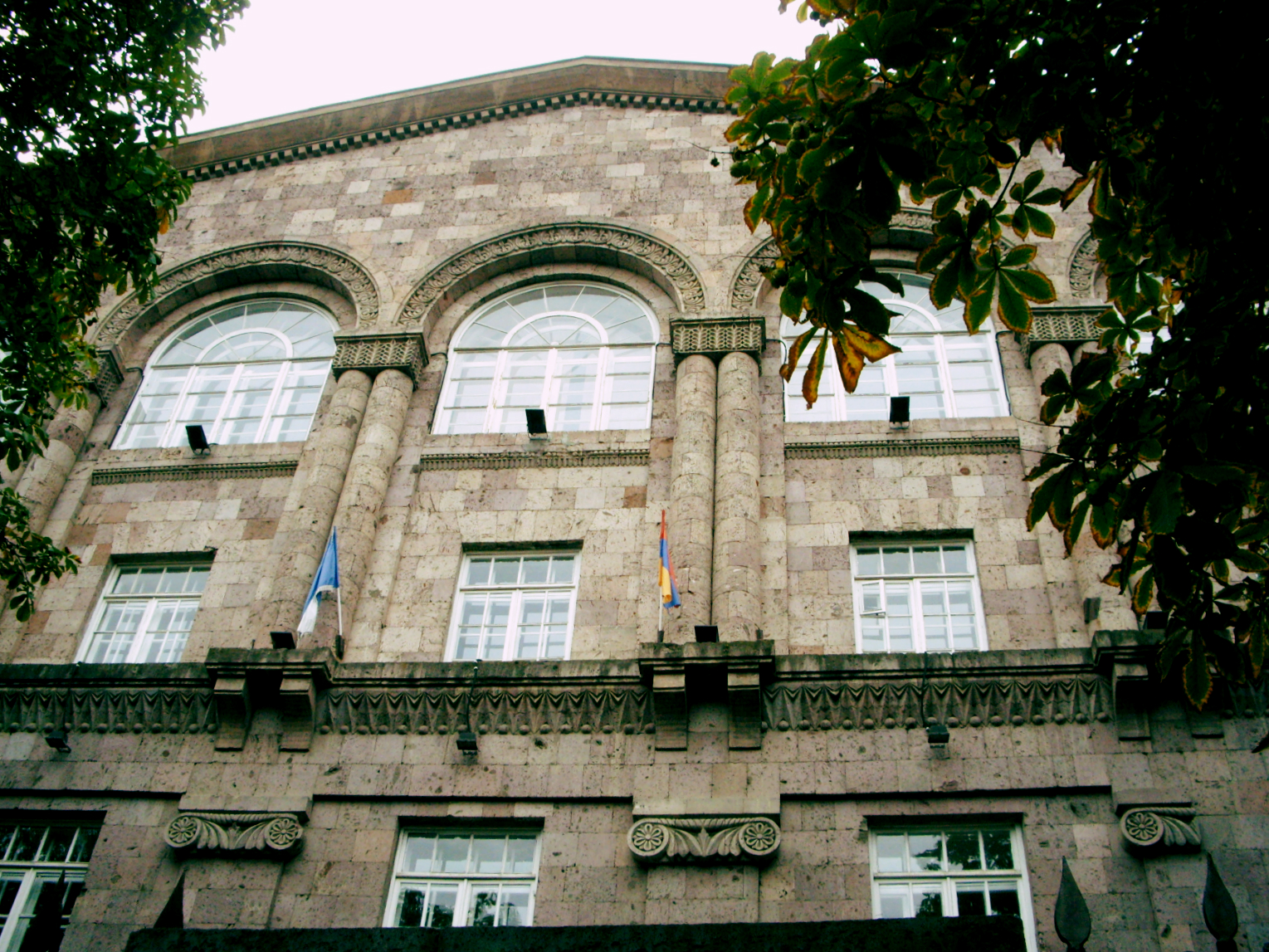
Vanadzor State University

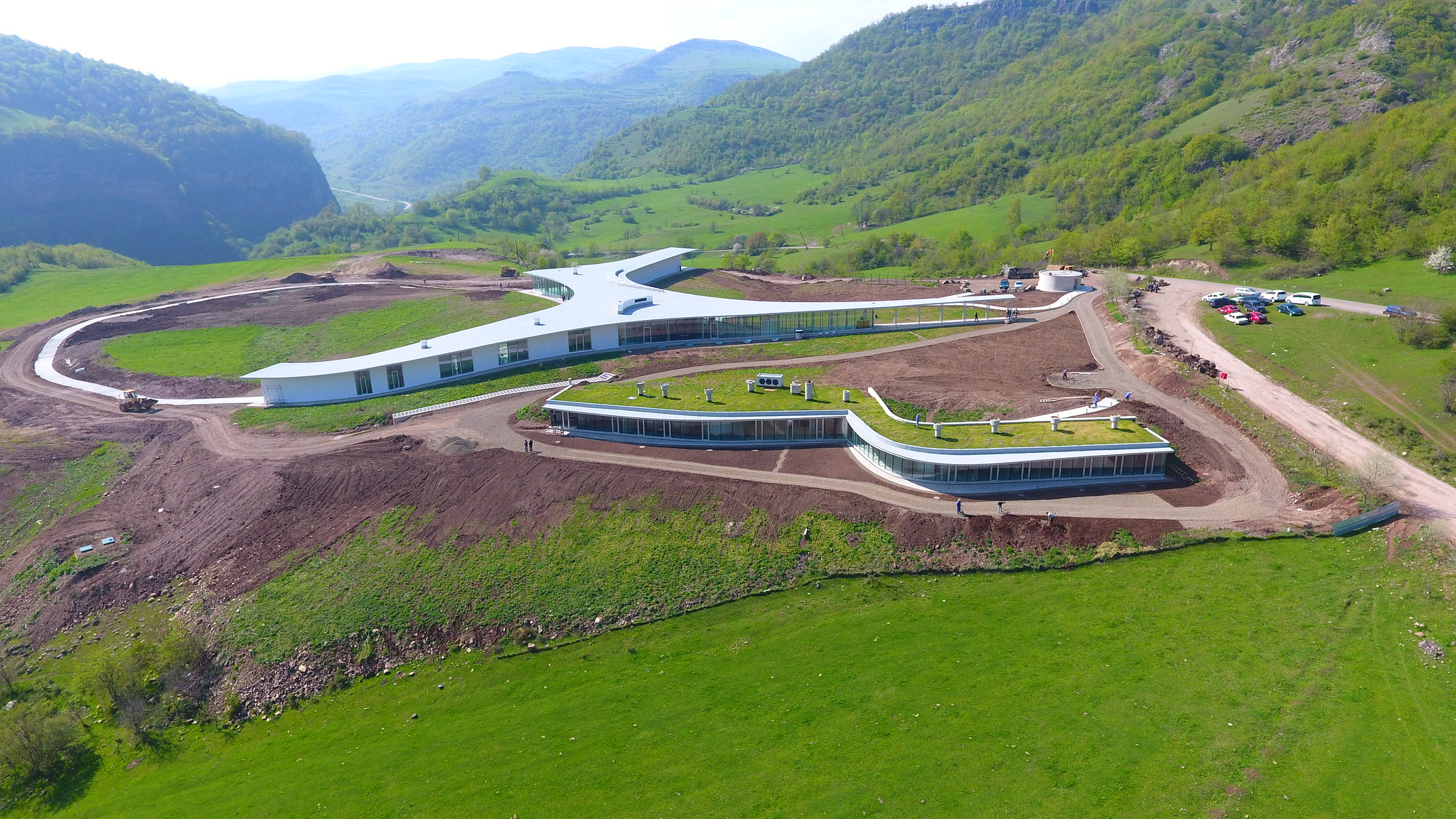
COAF SMART Center, Debed, Lori

Gugark was one of the major educational centres throughout the history. The historic University of Sanahin opened in 966 AD by the efforts of the Bagratuni queen Khosrovanush, was located in the area of modern-day Sanahin.

Currently, Vanadzor has two universities: the Vanadzor State University named after Hovhannes Tumanyan, and Mkhitar Gosh Armenian-Russian International University. Branches of the Yerevan State University and National Polytechnic University of Armenia are also operating in the city.

The State College of Alaverdi offers an opportunity in pedagogical studies with a duration of two years, while the Tumanyan branch of the "Northern University" offers degrees in nursing and dental prosthesis.

As of the 2015–16 educational year, Lori was home to 162 schools.

The Vanadzor Technological Center is operating since October 2016. It is intended to promote the business and technology environment in the entire region of Lori.

The Children of Armenia Fund (COAF), a non-profit NGO that is focused on child-centered development of rural Armenia, opened the first COAF SMART Center in Debet village of Lori in May 2018.

== Sport ==
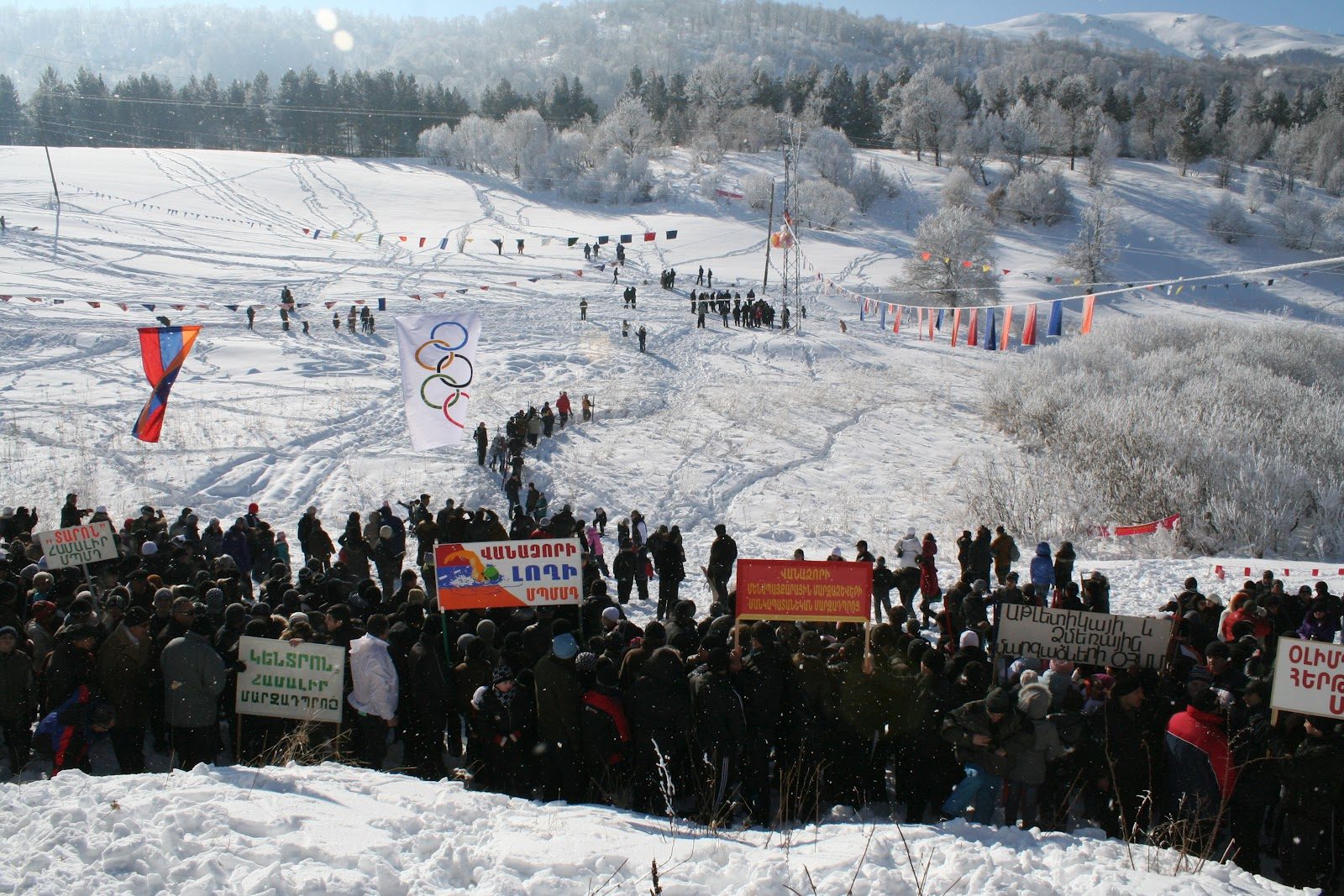
Vanadzor ski resort

Football, handball and winter sports are popular in Lori. There are football stadiums in Vanadzor, Alaverdi, Akhtala and Tumanyan.

Lori Vanadzor, FC Vanadzor, Debed FC and FC Akhtala had represented the province in the domestic football competitions. However, they were all dissolved due to financial difficulties.

The FFA Vanadzor Football Academy opened its doors on 29 October 2016. In 2017 the newly founded Lori FC made its debut in the Armenian First League, representing the city of Vanadzor.

Vanadzor is one of the prominent centers for winter sports in Armenia with ski facilities near the city.

== Notable natives ==
- Suren Aghababyan (1922–1986), Soviet Armenian literary critic
- Sergei Alifirenko, Olympic gold-medalist pistol shooter
- Nareh Arghamanyan, Armenian pianist, winner of the 2008 Montreal International Musical Competition
- Vic Darchinyan, Armenian professional boxer, three-division world champion
- Armen Gyulbudaghyants, prominent footballer and football manager
- Shavarsh Karapetyan, Soviet Armenian fin-swimmer
- Artem Mikoyan, Soviet Armenian aircraft designer, Mikoyan-Gurevich (MiG)
- Anastas Mikoyan, Soviet revolutionary, Old Bolshevik and statesman
- Roman Mitichyan, Armenian-American professional mixed martial artist, actor and stuntman
- Gor Mkhitarian, Armenian rock musician and singer
- Eduard Nalbandyan, Armenian politician
- Artavazd Peleshyan, director and filmmaker
- Avetik Sahakyan (1863–1933), Armenian politician of the First Republic of Armenia
- Sos Sargsyan (1929–2013), prominent actor, People's Artist of the Soviet Union
- Tigran Sargsyan, Armenian politician
- Stepan Sarkisyan, freestyle wrestling Olympic silver-medalist
- Mane Tandilyan, Minister of Labour and Social Affairs of Armenia (2018)
- Hovhannes Tumanyan (1869–1923), the national poet of Armenia
- Stepan Zoryan (1889–1967), Armenian writer

== Gallery ==
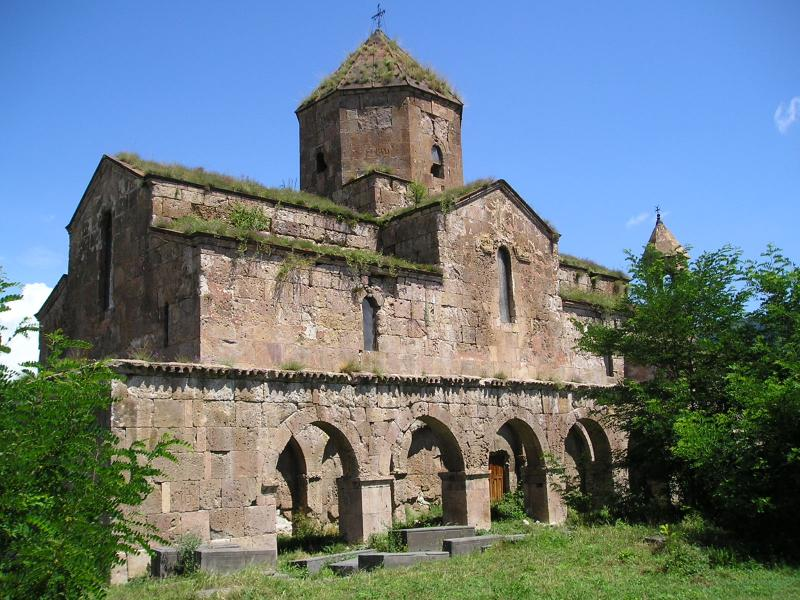
Odzun Church

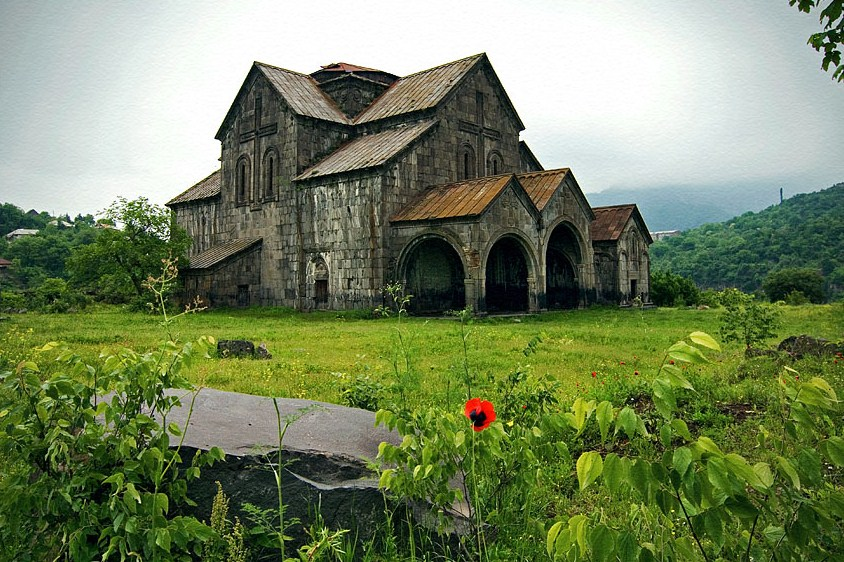
Akhtala monastery

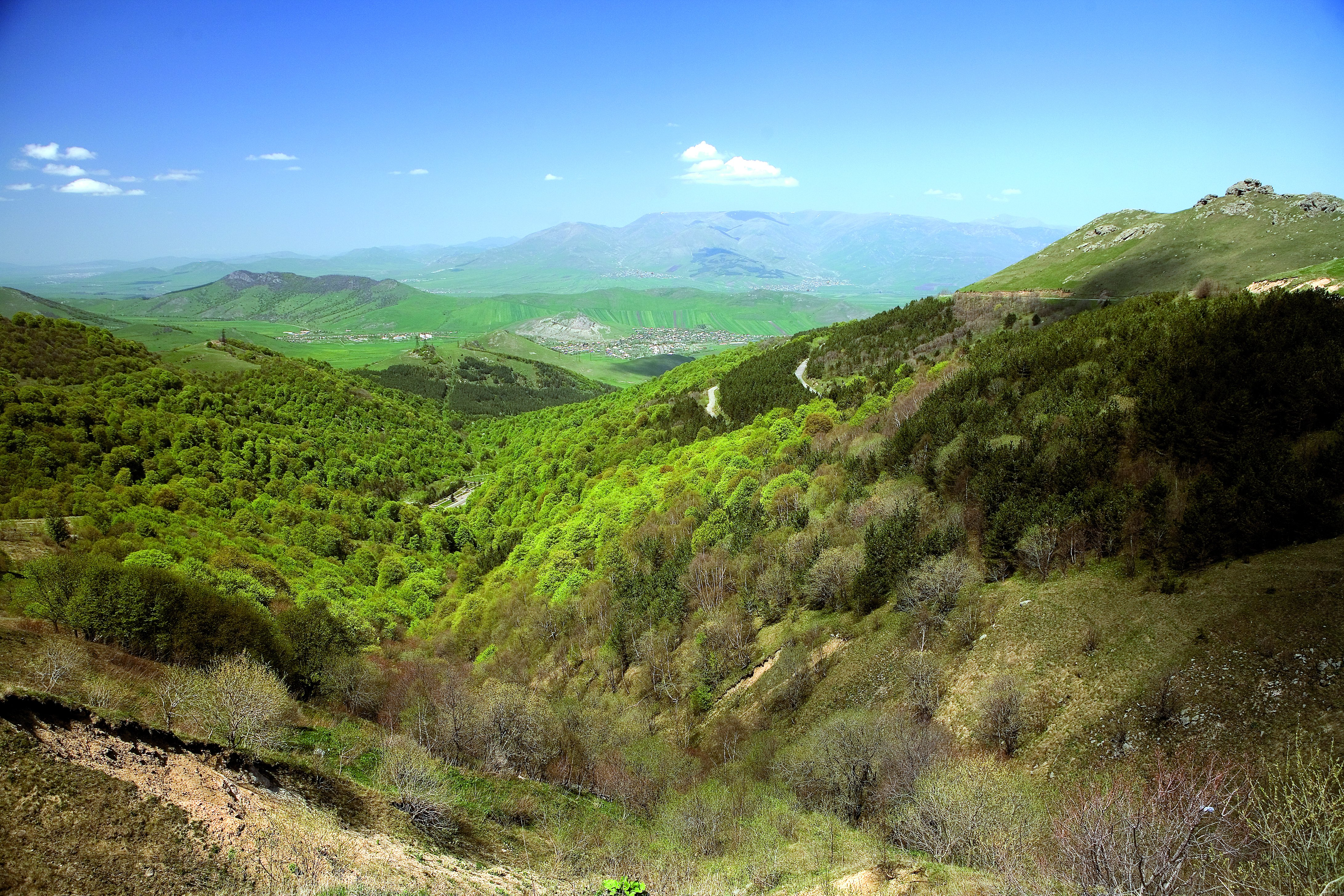
Northern Lori as seen from the Pushkin mountain pass

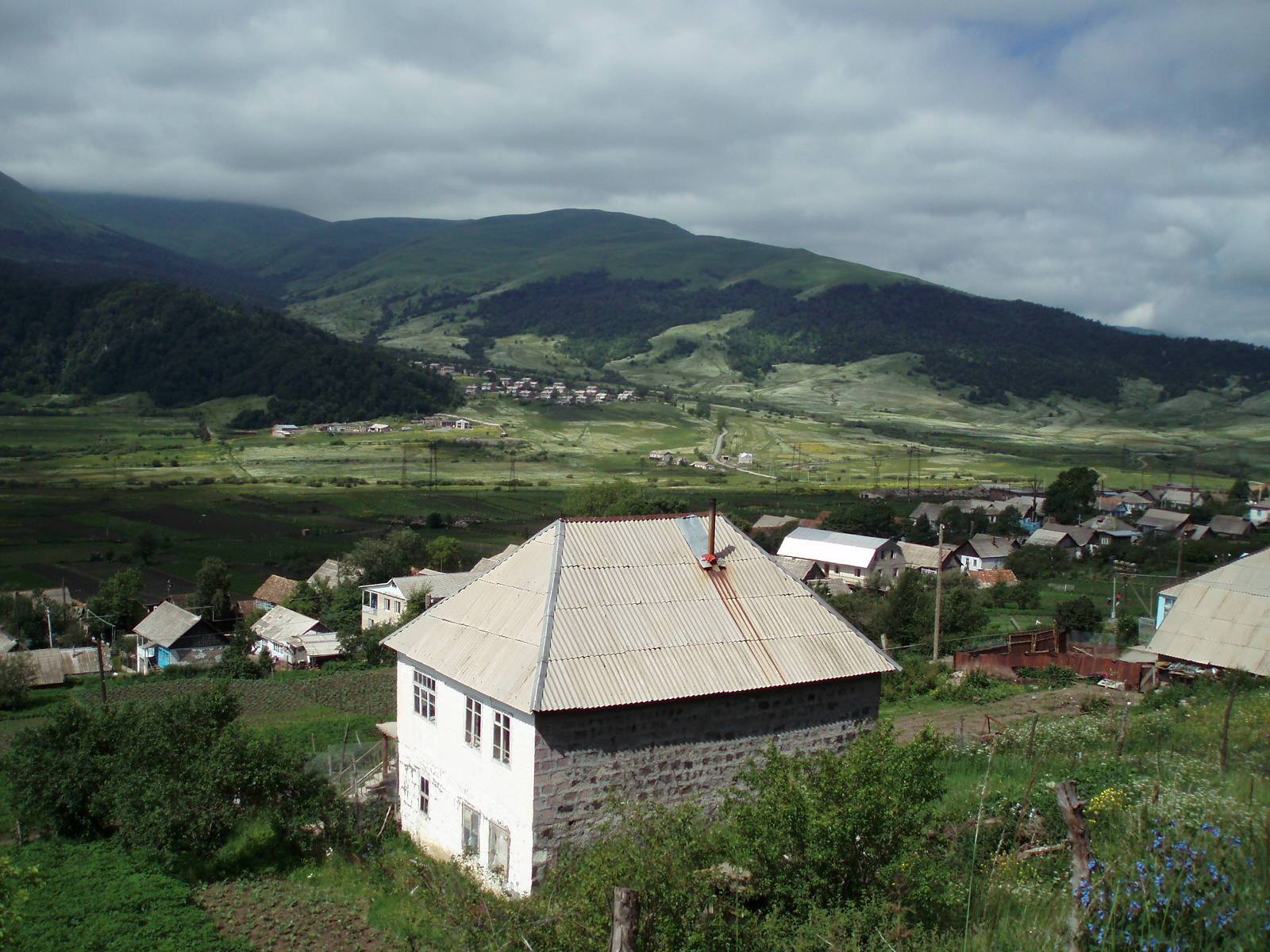
The village of Lermontovo

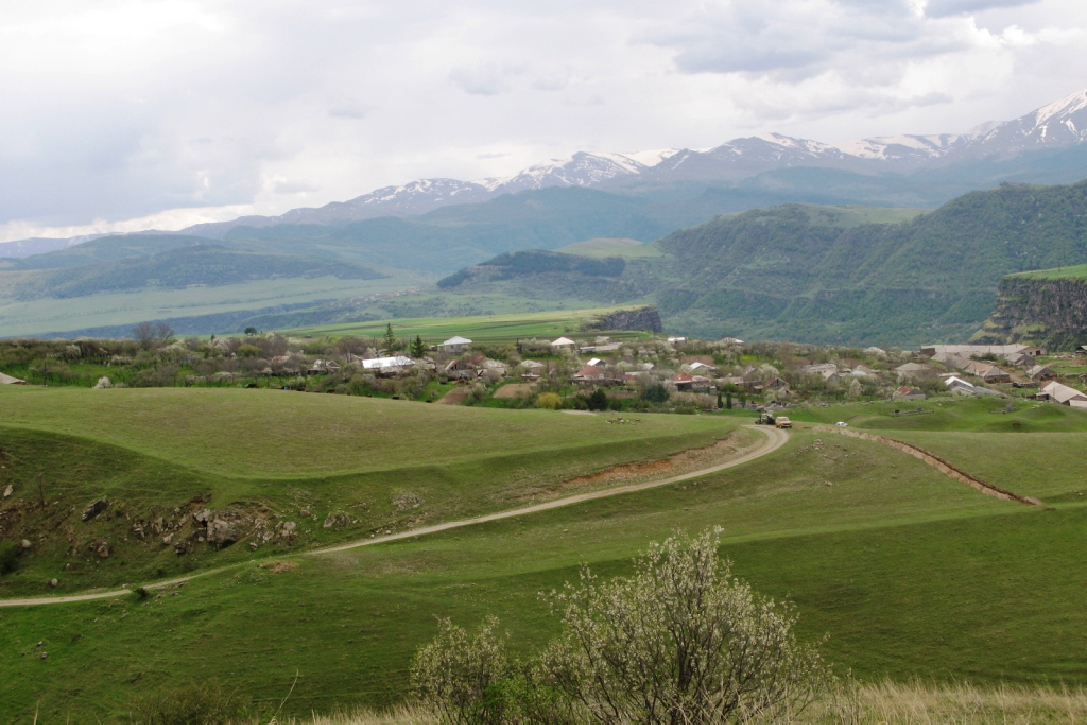
Somkheti mountains and Karmir Aghek village

== See also ==
- Gomshavar
- Kingdom of Tashir-Dzoraget
- Lori Fortress
- Manvo
