= Karaberd, Lori =

Karaberd Քարաբերդ

- Location within Armenia
- Coordinates: 40°50′52″N 44°31′20″E
- Country: Armenia
- Marz (Province): Lori
- Elevation: 1,050 m (3,440 ft)

Population (2011)
  - Total: 107
- Time zone: UTC+4 ( )
  - Summer (DST): UTC+5 ( )

Karaberd (Armenian: Քարաբերդ} Սարըմսախլու) is a town in the Lori Province of Armenia.
