= Amoj =

Amoj Ամոջ
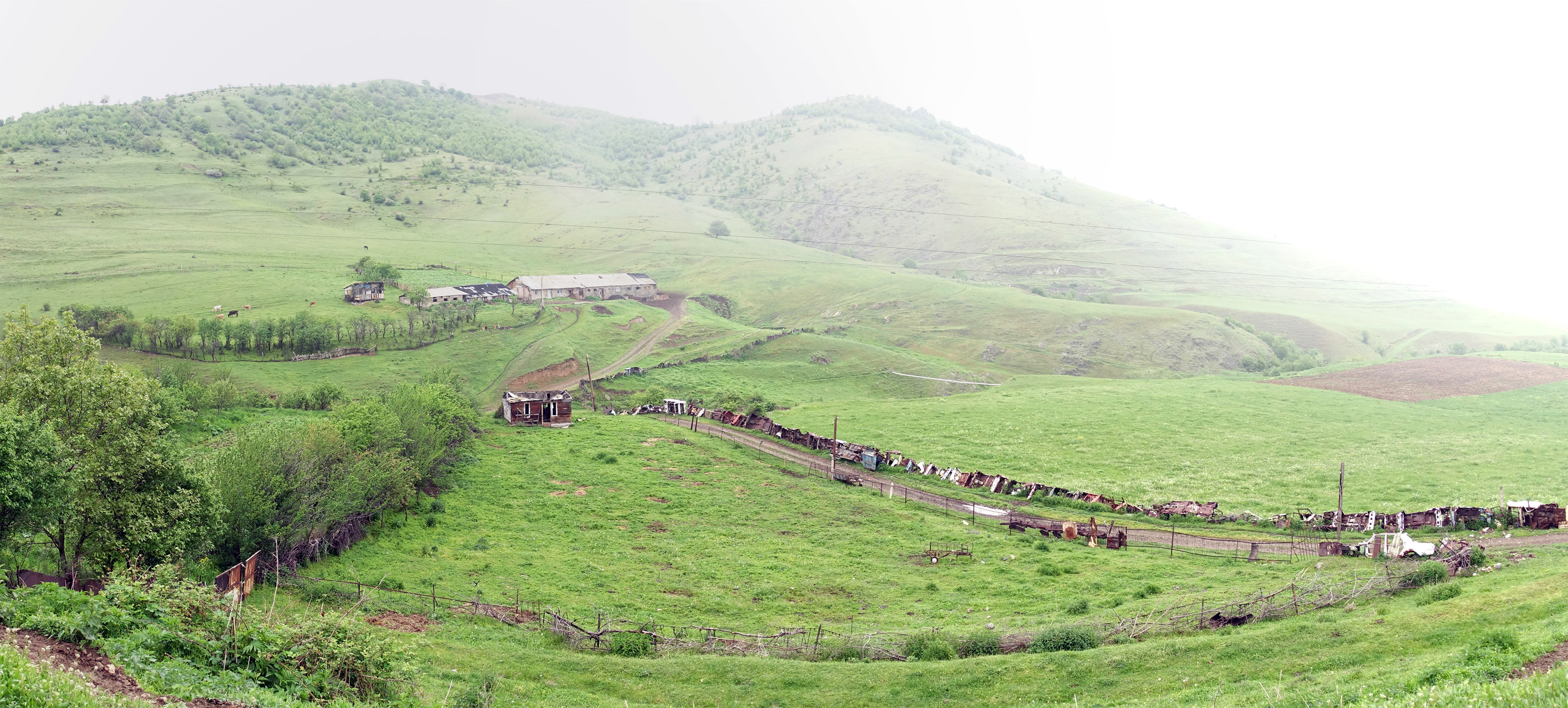

- Location within Armenia
- Coordinates: 41°04′N 44°36′E
- Country: Armenia
- Province: Lori
- Elevation: 1,200 m (3,900 ft)

Population (2011)
  - Total: 157
- Time zone: UTC+4 (AMT)

Amoj (Armenian: Ամոջ) is a village in the Lori Province of Armenia.
