= Hagvi =

Hagvi Հագվի
- Location within Armenia
- Coordinates: 41°04′N 44°35′E
- Country: Armenia
- Province: Lori
- Elevation: 1,070 m (3,510 ft)

Population (2011)
  - Total: 402
- Time zone: UTC+4 (AMT)

Hagvi (Armenian: Հագվի) is a village in the Lori Province of Armenia.
