= Akhtala (village) =

Akhtala Ախթալա
- Location within Armenia
- Coordinates: 41°10′N 44°46′E
- Country: Armenia
- Province: Lori
- Municipality: Akhtala
- Elevation: 1,214 m (3,983 ft)

Population (2011)
  - Total: 19
- Time zone: UTC+4

Akhtala (Armenian: Ախթալա) is a village in the Lori Province of Armenia.
