= Kizkala =

- Location within Armenia
- Coordinates: 41°03′N 44°21′E
- Country: Armenia
- Marz (Province): Lori Province
- Time zone: UTC+4 ( )

Kizkala is an abandoned village in the Lori Province of Armenia.
