= Aroghjaranin kits =

Aroghjaranin kits Առողջարանին կից
- Location within Armenia
- Coordinates: 40°58′24″N 44°41′19″E
- Country: Armenia
- Province: Lori
- Municipality: Akhtala
- Elevation: 1,375 m (4,511 ft)

Population (2011)
  - Total: 14
- Time zone: UTC+4 (AMT)

Aroghjaranin kits (Armenian: Առողջարանին կից) is a village in the Akhtala Municipality of the Lori Province of Armenia.
