= Meghvahovit =

Meghvahovit Մեղվահովիտ
- Location within Armenia
- Coordinates: 41°7′0″N 44°9′14″E
- Country: Armenia
- Marz (Province): Lori Province
- Elevation: 1,670 m (5,480 ft)

Population (2011)
  - Total: 105
- Time zone: UTC+4
  - Summer (DST): UTC+5

Meghvahovit (Armenian: Մեղվահովիտ)(Former name (Azerb.) - Qaraisa) is a village in the Lori Province of Armenia. The village was populated by Azerbaijanis before the exodus of Azerbaijanis from Armenia after the outbreak of the Nagorno-Karabakh conflict. In 1988-1989 Armenian refugees from Azerbaijan settled in the village.
