= Darpas =

Darpas Դարպաս

- Location within Armenia
- Coordinates: 40°50′17″N 44°25′24″E
- Country: Armenia
- Marz (Province): Lori Province

Population (2011)
  - Total: 1,664
- Time zone: UTC+4 ( )
  - Summer (DST): UTC+5 ( )

Darpas (Armenian: Դարպաս, also romanized as Darbas) is a town in the Lori Province of Armenia.
