= Arjhovit =

Arjhovit Արջհովիտ
- Location within Armenia
- Coordinates: 40°49′38″N 44°20′37″E
- Country: Armenia
- Province: Lori
- Municipality: Spitak
- Elevation: 1,580 m (5,180 ft)

Population (2001)
  - Total: 496
- Time zone: UTC+4

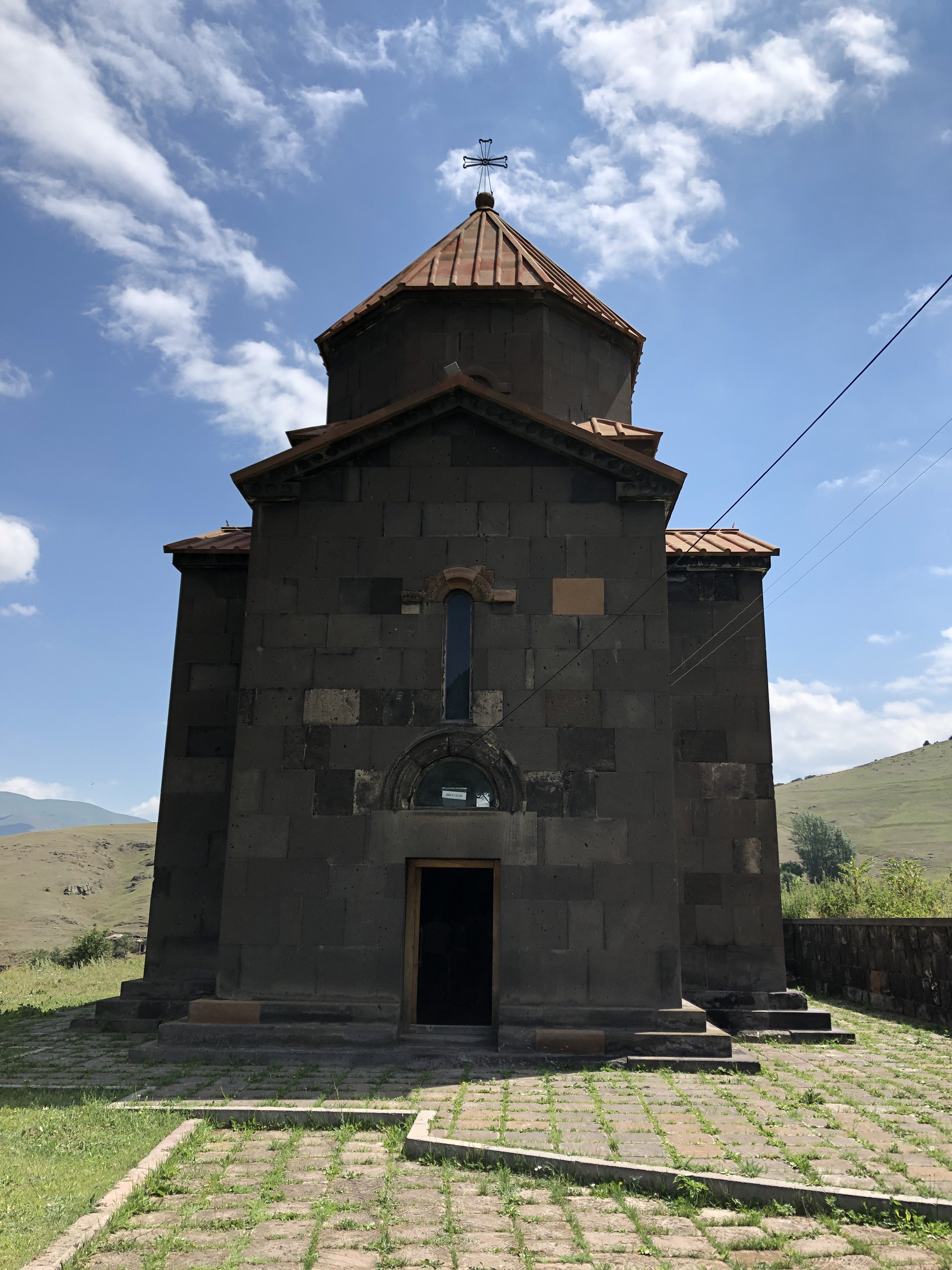
Saint Gevorg Church

Arjhovit (Armenian: Արջհովիտ) is a village in the Lori Province of Armenia. In 1988 and 1989, Armenian refugees from Azerbaijan settled in the village.
