= Noramut =

Noramut Նորամուտ
- Location within Armenia
- Coordinates: 41°06′N 44°07′E
- Country: Armenia
- Marz (Province): Lori Province
- Elevation: 1,710 m (5,610 ft)

Population (2011)
  - Total: 62
- Time zone: UTC+4
  - Summer (DST): UTC+5

Noramut (Armenian: Նորամուտ; Azerbaijani: Qaraqala) is a village in the Lori Province of Armenia. The village was populated by Azerbaijanis before 1990.
