= Tsaghkashat =

Tsaghkashat Ծաղկաշատ
- Location within Armenia
- Coordinates: 41°04′36″N 44°44′25″E
- Country: Armenia
- Province: Lori
- Elevation: 1,500 m (4,900 ft)

Population (2011)
  - Total: 181
- Time zone: UTC+4 (AMT)

Tsaghkashat (Armenian: Ծաղկաշատ) is a village in the Lori Province of Armenia.

== Toponymy ==
The village was formerly known as Khachidur.
