= Pokr Ayrum =

Pokr Ayrum Փոքր Այրում
- Location within Armenia
- Coordinates: 41°09′21″N 44°47′40″E
- Country: Armenia
- Province: Lori
- Elevation: 705 m (2,313 ft)

Population (2011)
  - Total: 160
- Time zone: UTC+4 (AMT)

Pokr Ayrum (Armenian: Փոքր Այրում; Azerbaijani: Kiçik Ayrım) is a village in the Lori Province of Armenia. The village was populated by Azerbaijanis before the exodus of Azerbaijanis from Armenia after the outbreak of the Nagorno-Karabakh conflict.
