= Pambak kayaranin kits =

Pambak kayaranin kits Փամբակ կայարանին կից
- Location within Armenia
- Coordinates: 40°49′45″N 44°33′31″E
- Country: Armenia
- Province: Lori
- Elevation: 1,220 m (4,000 ft)

Population (2011)
  - Total: 53
- Time zone: UTC+4

Pambak kayaranin kits (Armenian: Փամբակ կայարանին կից) is a village in the Lori Province of Armenia.
