= Arjut kayaranin kits =

Arjut kayaranin kits Արջուտ կայարանին կից
- Location within Armenia
- Coordinates: 40°45′54″N 44°37′48″E
- Country: Armenia
- Province: Lori
- Elevation: 1,400 m (4,600 ft)

Population (2011)
  - Total: 53
- Time zone: UTC+4

Arjut kayaranin kits (Armenian: Արջուտ կայարանին կից) is a village in the Lori Province of Armenia.
