= Dashtadem, Lori =

Dashtadem Դաշտադեմ
- Location within Armenia
- Coordinates: 41°08′12″N 44°10′30″E
- Country: Armenia
- Marz (Province): Lori
- Elevation: 1,450 m (4,760 ft)

Population (2011)
  - Total: 127
- Time zone: UTC+4 ( )
  - Summer (DST): UTC+5

Dashtadem (Armenian: Դաշտադեմ) is a village in the Lori Province of Armenia/ populated by Azerbaijani people before 1988.
