= Saramej =

Saramej Սարամեջ
- Location within Armenia
- Coordinates: 40°46′21″N 44°13′09″E
- Country: Armenia
- Marz (Province): Lori Province
- Elevation: 1,770 m (5,810 ft)

Population (2011)
  - Total: 1,344
- Time zone: UTC+4 ( )
  - Summer (DST): UTC+5 ( )

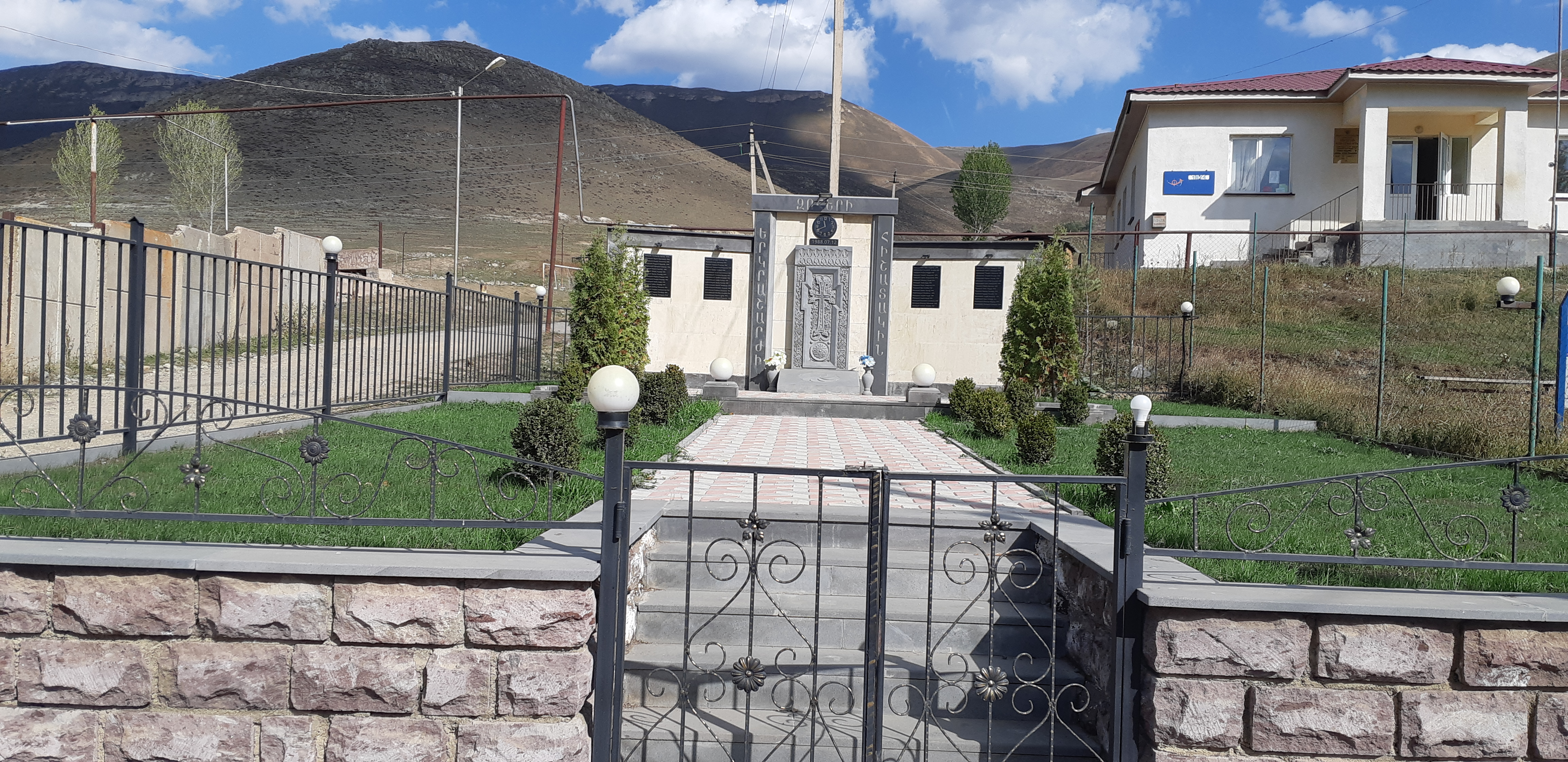
Saramej village, Lori

Saramej (Armenian: Սարամեջ, also romanized as Saramech; formerly, Chotur) is a town in the Lori Province of Armenia.
