= Manvo =

- Location within Armenia
- Coordinates: 41°05′N 44°38′E
- Country: Armenia
- Marz (Province): Lori Province
- Time zone: UTC+4 ( )
  - Summer (DST): UTC+5 ( )

Manvo (also, Manes) is a town in the Lori Province of Armenia.
