= Antarashen =

Antarashen Անտառաշեն
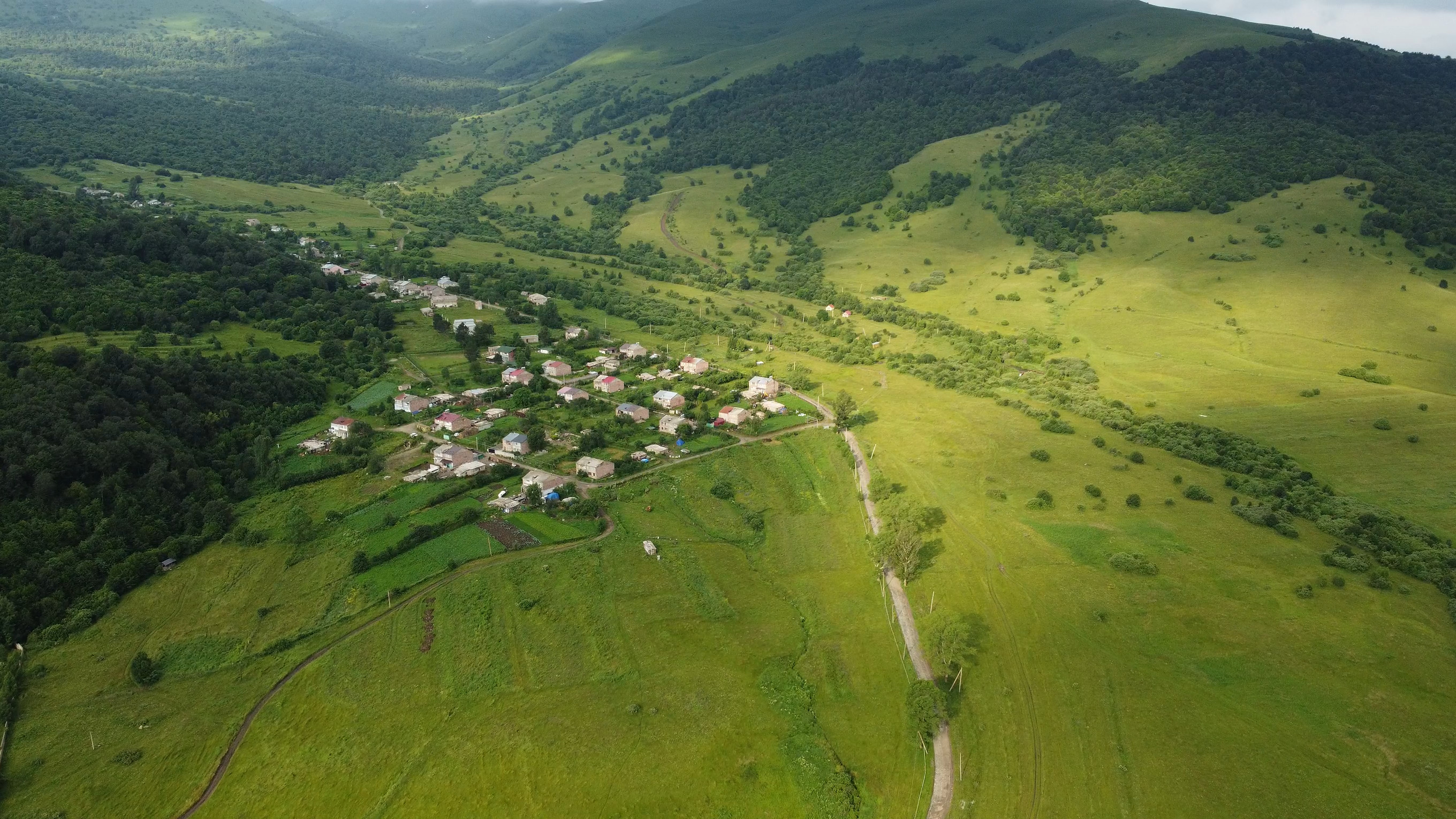

- Location within Armenia
- Coordinates: 40°45′0″N 44°37′30″E
- Country: Armenia
- Province: Lori
- Elevation: 1,900 m (6,200 ft)

Population (2011)
  - Total: 259
- Time zone: UTC+4 (AMT)

Antarashen (Armenian: Անտառաշեն) is a village in the Lori Province of Armenia.

== Toponymy ==
The village was previously known as Gazanabutsakan petakan tntesutyane kits (lit. 'animal-farm state housing').
