= Gushar =

Gushar Գուշար
- Location within Armenia
- Coordinates: 40°44′23″N 44°25′23″E
- Country: Armenia
- Province: Lori
- Elevation: 1,950 m (6,400 ft)

Population
  - Total: 0
- Time zone: UTC+4 ( )

Gushar (Armenian: Գուշար), is an abandoned village in the Lori Province of Armenia.

== Population ==
Year	1916	1926	1939	1959	1970	1979	2011
Population	167	156	201	118	188	190	0
