= Kruglaya Shishka =

Kruglaya Shishka Կրուգլայա շիշկա
- Location within Armenia
- Coordinates: 41°08′38″N 44°20′46″E
- Country: Armenia
- Marz (Province): Lori Province
- Elevation: 1,600 m (5,200 ft)

Population (2011)
  - Total: 90
- Time zone: UTC+4 ( )
  - Summer (DST): UTC+5

Kruglaya Shishka (Armenian: Կրուգլայա շիշկա), is a village in the Lori Province of Armenia.
