= Nor Khachakap =

Nor Khachakap Նոր Խաչակապ
- Village
- Location in Armenia
- Coordinates: 40°50′33″N 44°21′45″E
- Country: Armenia
- Province: Lori
- Elevation: 1,517 m (4,977 ft)

Population (2011)
  - Total: 631
- Time zone: UTC+4
  - Summer (DST): UTC+5

Nor Khachakap (Armenian: Նոր Խաչակապ) is a village in Lori Province, Armenia.
