= Karkop =

Karkop Քարկոփ
- Location within Armenia
- Coordinates: 41°12′N 44°50′E
- Country: Armenia
- Marz (Province): Lori Province
- Elevation: 600 m (2,000 ft)

Population (2011)
  - Total: 323
- Time zone: UTC+4 ( )
  - Summer (DST): UTC+5 ( )

Karkop (Armenian: Քարկոփ) is a village in the Lori Province of Armenia.
