= Lernajur =

Lernajur Լեռնաջուր
- Location within Armenia
- Coordinates: 40°46′12″N 44°23′03″E
- Country: Armenia
- Province: Lori
- Elevation: 1,650 m (5,410 ft)

Population (2001)
  - Total: 111
- Time zone: UTC+4 ( )
  - Summer (DST): UTC+5 ( )

Lernajur (Armenian: Լեռնաջուր), previously known as Halavar (Armenian: Հալավար, romanized: Halavar), is a village in the Lori Province of Armenia.
