= Gomshavar =

- Location within Armenia
- Coordinates: 41°06′N 44°55′E
- Country: Armenian Soviet Socialist Republic
- Marz (Province): Tavush Province
- Time zone: UTC+4 ( )
  - Summer (DST): UTC+5 ( )

Gomshavar (also - Gomshajur, Armenian: Գոմշավար, Գոմշաջուր) is a former town in the current territory of the Tavush region of Armenia. Before 1950, Gomshavar was a small community engaged in forestry. In 1926, it had 17 inhabitants, while in 1970 it had 580 inhabitants.
