= Russians in Armenia =

Русские в Армении Ռուսները Հայաստանում

Total population
- 14,074 (2022)

Regions with significant populations
- Yerevan, Gyumri, Vanadzor

Languages
- Russian, Armenian

Religion
- Eastern Orthodox Christianity (Russian Orthodox or Armenian Orthodox); Protestantism (Molokans)

Russians in Armenia (Russian: Русские в Армении, romanized: Russkiye v Armenii, Armenian: Ռուսները Հայաստանում, romanized: Rrusnery Hayastanum) are ethnic Russians living in Armenia, where they make up the second largest minority (after the Yazidis). In the 2022 census, there were 14,074 Russians counted, making up about 0.5% of the whole population of Armenia.

== History ==
The first mass-immigration of Russians into Armenia occurred about 1840 when thousands of heterodox Spiritual Christians in central Russia and Novorossiya, and other non-Orthodox tribes were resettled in this newly conquered territory. "By ordering this migration in 1830, Nicholas I attempted at once to cleanse Russian Orthodoxy of heresies and to populate the newly annexed lands with ethnic Slavs who would shoulder the burden of imperial construction." About 5000 of descendants remain in the country.

After the Russo-Turkish war of 1828-1829 many Russians immigrated to Russian Armenia, establishing businesses and churches, and settling throughout mountainous northwest of the country. During Soviet period much more Russians immigrated into Armenian SSR and were engaged in the industry and clerical work. Outward migration of Russians increased after 1990, during the Dissolution of the Soviet Union, when economic conditions harshly deteriorated and Armenian became the official language of the country.

Traditional Russian villages can still be found in Amassia, Ashotsk (Shirak), Sevan and Semyonvka (Gegharkunik Province), Filoetovo, Lermontov, Pushkino, Sverdlov, Lernantsk, Medovka, Lerhovit, Petrovka, Tashir and Mikaielovska (Lori Province).

=== Immigration following 2022 Russian invasion of Ukraine ===
Following the 2022 Russian invasion of Ukraine, a significant number of Russians (particularly within the IT sector) left for Armenia, primarily due to sanctions and a crackdown on dissent to the war. A majority of them settled within the cities of Yerevan and Gyumri, unintentionally causing a spike in local property prices. For example, Armenian apartments for sale cost much more in 2022 than they did in 2021. The cost of apartments in the city's center increased by an average of 109,000 drams during the course of a year (about 273 Euros). A further wave of Russians left for Armenia in September and October due to the mobilization of Russian citizens later into the war.

The status of Russians in Armenia, concerning language and schooling, has become complicated. In Soviet times, Russian language schools were highly sought after, but many were dissolved following 1991. Many Russian-only schools remain active, but are criticized due to Russia's influence on these schools. As a result, many Russians with children who fled to Armenia have had a difficult time finding Russian schools that are not affiliated with Moscow. Russia has placed pressure on Yerevan to open more Russian schools, which have so far not been successful.

At the same time, there are complications concerning the status of Russian as a language. With the influx of Russians following 2022, many have voiced concern that the use of Armenian will dwindle in the face of Russian and English. It has been reported that many Russian migrants don't feel the need to learn Armenian, and many Russian schools don't have Armenian taught as a mandatory subject. Still, many Russian migrants with children feel that, in order to better integrate, their children should learn Armenian.

== Russian Orthodox churches in Armenia ==
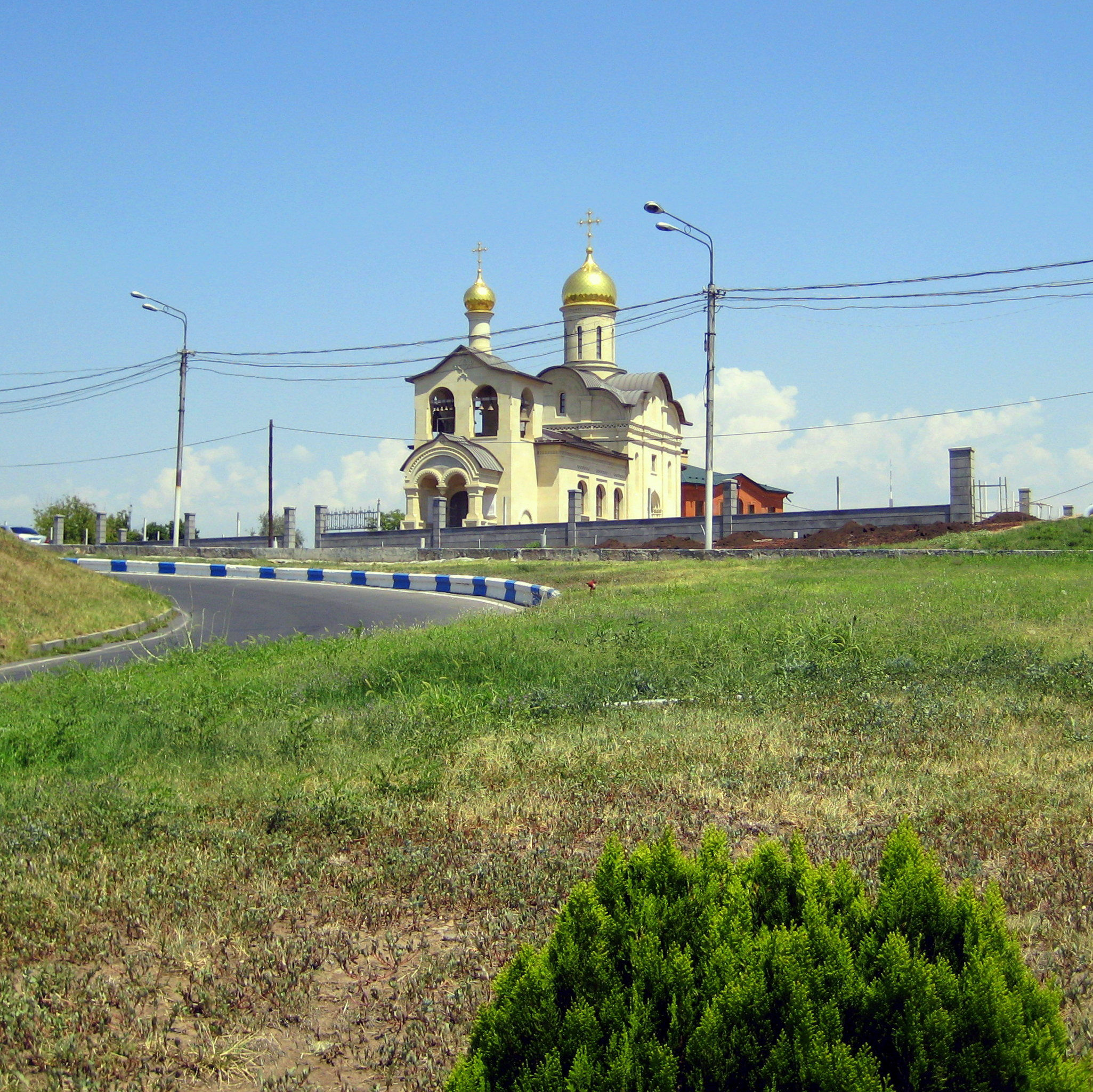
Holy Cross Church in Yerevan

=== Amrakits ===
- Saint Nikolai the Wonderworker's Church, opened in 1848.

=== Gyumri ===
- Saint Alexandra the Martyr's Church, opened in 1837.
- Saint Michael the Archangel's Church, opened in 1880.
- Saint Arsenije Church of, opened in 1910.

=== Vanadzor ===
- Church of the Nativity of Blessed Virgin Mary, opened in 1895.

=== Yerevan ===
- Church of the Intercession of the Holy Mother of God, opened in 1916.
- Holy Cross Church, opened in 2017.

=== Demolished churches ===
- Russian church of the Seversky 18th Dragoon Regiment, built in 1856 in Gyumri. It was consecrated in 1901 and destroyed during the Soviet-era.
- Russian church of the Caucasian 7th Rifle Regiment, built during the 1850s in Gyumri. It was destroyed during the Soviet-era.
- Russian church of the Caucasian 8th Rifle Regiment, built during the 1850s in Gyumri. It was destroyed during the Soviet-era.
- Russian church of the Baku 154th Infantry Regiment, built during the 1850s in Gyumri. It was destroyed during the Soviet-era.
- Saint Nikolai Cathedral, Yerevan, built in the 2nd half of the 19th century and destroyed in 1931.

== See also ==
- Ethnic minorities in Armenia
- Russian Armenia
- Armenians in Russia
- Armenian-Russian relations
- Russians in post-Soviet states
- Russian diaspora
