= Demographics of Armenia =

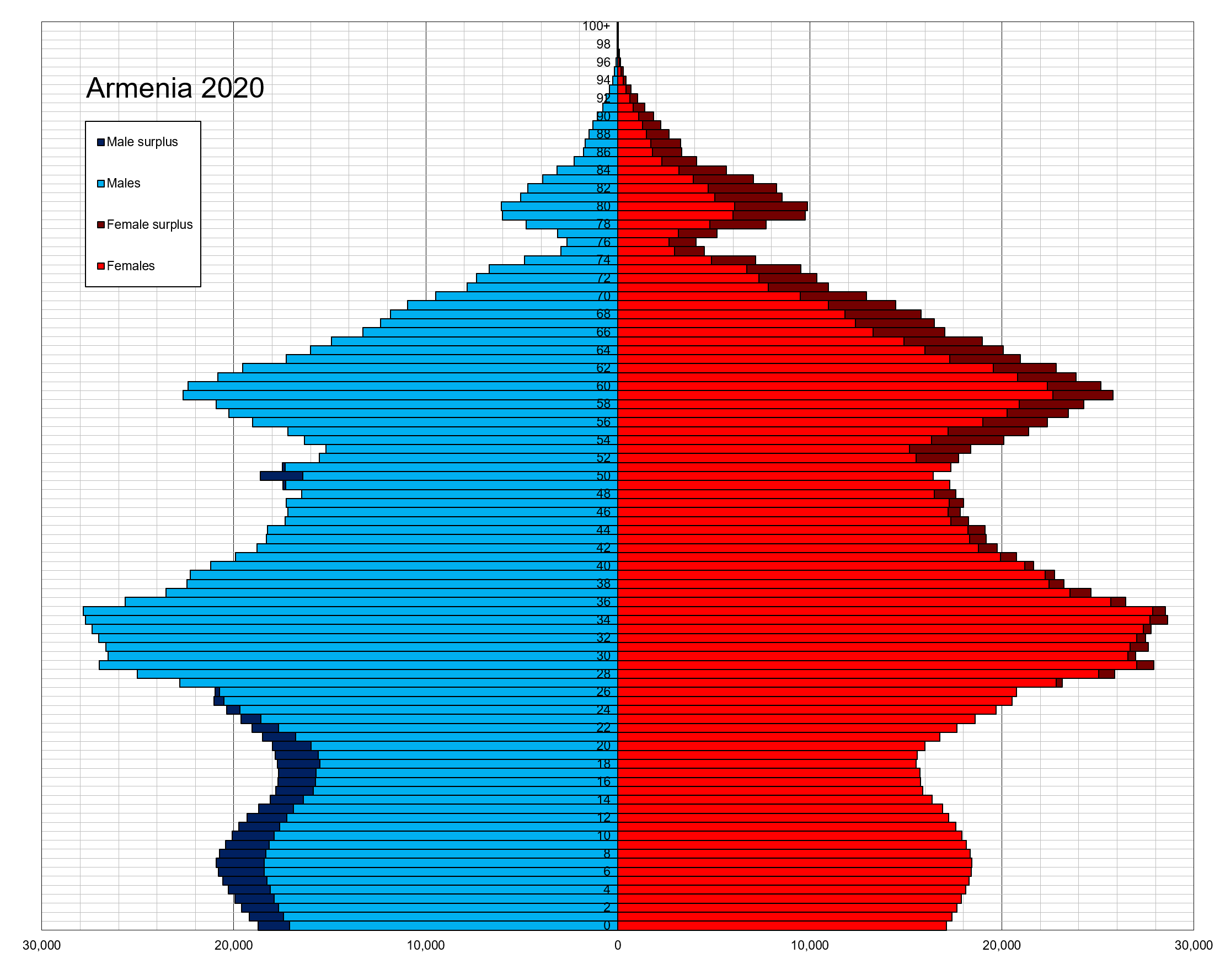
- Armenia population pyramid in 2020
- Population: 3,075,800 (January 1, 2025)
- Density: 107/km^{2}
- Growth rate: 0.27/1,000 population (2016 est.)
- Birth rate: 11.1 births/1,000 population (2024)
- Death rate: 8.4 deaths/1,000 population (2024)
- Life expectancy: 77.7 years
  - male: 74.1 years
  - female: 81.0 years
- Fertility rate: 1.71 children born/woman (2024)
- Immigrant share: 9.2% (2024)

Nationality
- Nationality: Armenian(s)
- Major ethnic: Armenian
- Minor ethnic: Russian, Yazidis, Kurds, Assyrians

Language
- Official: Armenian
- Spoken: Armenian, English, Russian, French, Greek, Kurdish, and others

The population of Eastern Armenia – corresponding to the First Republic of Armenia as well as Soviet and post-Soviet Armenia – has undergone significant changes in the 20th century.

Following Turkey's genocide of Armenians in 1915, between 300,000–600,000 Armenians fled from Western Armenia to Eastern Armenia, a number which increased further following Turkey's invasion of Eastern Armenia in 1920. After registering steady increases during the Soviet period due to repatriation campaigns and low emigration rates, the population declined from its peak value of 3.633 million in 1992 to 3.075 million in 2025. Primary factors contributing to this emigration include the Nagorno-Karabakh conflict and the economic hardship caused by the ongoing blockade imposed by Turkey and Azerbaijan (1989–present). Recently there has been a moderate influx of Armenians returning to Armenia.

== Historical statistics ==
Census population and average annual growth rate

Year	Pop.	±% p.a.
1831	161,747	—
1873	496,140	+2.70%
1886	635,833	+1.93%
1897	797,853	+2.08%
1904	877,322	+1.37%
1914	1,014,255	+1.46%
1916	993,782	−1.01%
1919	961,677	−1.09%
1920	720,000	−25.13%
1922	782,052	+4.22%
1926	878,929	+2.96%

Year	Pop.	±% p.a.
1931	1,050,633	+3.63%
1939	1,282,338	+2.52%
1959	1,763,048	+1.60%
1970	2,491,873	+3.20%
1979	3,037,259	+2.22%
1989	3,304,776	+0.85%
2001	3,213,011	−0.23%
2011	3,018,854	−0.62%
2022	2,932,731	−0.26%
2024	3,039,700	+1.81%

For 1831–1931 (Note: The population in 1926 was later reported as 881,290 due to territorial adjustments that took place from 1926–1931.)
For 1920
For 1926
For 1939–1989 (Note: The population in 1989 was later reported as 3,448,600.)
For 2001
For 2011

Citing Armenia's conquest and occupation by the Seljuks (11th century) and Mongols (13th–15th centuries), historians Edmund Herzig and Marina Kurkchiyan write "the combination of progressive Turkish (and Kurdish) immigration and Armenian decline, through massacre, famine and emigration, changed the demographic balance in a way that Arab immigration had never done".

As a result of "deliberate relocation policies employed by both the Ottomans and Safavids" during the Ottoman–Safavid War, there was a large-scale displacement of Armenians; Armenians also emigrated "to escape the insecurity and hardship of life in war-torn Armenia". Whilst Shah Abbas I relocated Armenians to Isfahan and "Armenian colonies in other parts of Iran" in 1604–1605, "the Ottomans also removed Armenian artisans to their capital".

Following the Russian annexation, 45,000 Armenians from Persia and 100,000 from the Ottoman Empire migrated to Eastern Armenia, with another 25,000 migrating following the 1878 Russo-Turkish war. As a result of the repatriation, Armenians had regained a majority in their homeland "for the first time in several hundred years". As a result of persecution and massacres in the Ottoman Empire, some 100,000 Armenians immigrated to Eastern Armenia between 1870 and 1910. The areas with Armenian-majorities would later "form the nucleus in the twentieth century of an independent Armenian state".

Historian Sen Hovhannisian writes that during the 80 years of peace during which Eastern Armenia was part of Russia, there was "unprecedented" population growth: it tripled from 161,700 to 496,100 between 1831 and 1873, and doubled in the following forty years until it reached 1,000,100 in 1913. The population between 1831 and 1913 increased 6.18 times, yielding an average annual growth rate of 10,200 people. Following the outbreak of World War I, the population, which was 1,014,300 in 1914, fell by 20,500 in 1916 due to the Christian population being drafted. As a result of "wars and civil clashes, hunger and diseases" of 1918–1920, 432,000 people (35.8 percent of the population) were "exterminated".

Upon its sovietisation, the territory of modern-day Armenia had a population of some 720,000, a decline of nearly 30 percent—"almost half" consisted of refugees. American historian Richard Pipes states that "according to Soviet estimates, the Armenian population of Transcaucasia declined between 1914 and 1920 by one half million: 200,000 in consequence of Turkish, and, presumably, Communist, massacres, and 300,000 from other causes, mostly famine and disease".

The drastic decline of the population was addressed by the Soviet Armenian government by repatriating displaced Azerbaijanis to districts where they had formed a significant population in Armenia. The Azerbaijani population of Armenia which numbered some 10,000 in 1920 (attributed to the ARF government's expulsion of at least 200,000 Turks and Kurds) rose to 72,596 in 1922 as a result of the return of 60,000 refugees. In addition to this, the Soviet government welcomed 44,000 Armenian refugees from Greece, Iraq, Turkey, and elsewhere throughout the 1920s and 1930s. In 1946–1948, 86,000 Armenians were repatriated to Soviet Armenia to offset the country's wartime losses. At the same time, by agreement of Armenian and Azerbaijani Soviet leaderships, tens of thousands of Azerbaijanis in Armenia were resettled to Azerbaijan to make room for the repatriates.

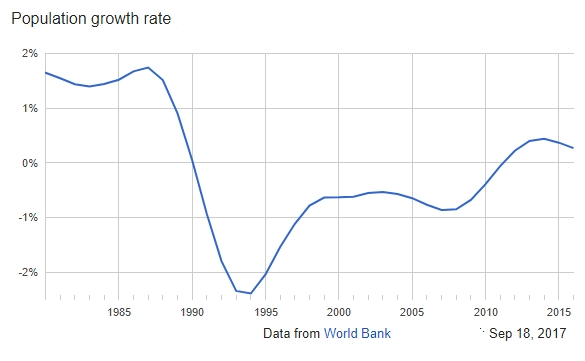
Population growth rates in Armenia in years 1980–2016. Data from World Bank

Global map of changes in population growth rates
- Population growth rates in 2010–2015 vs. 2005–2010 A study revealed that population growth rates were more positive in Armenia, compared to surrounding countries in the specified period.

== Population size and structure ==
According to the 2018 HDI statistical update (with data for 2017), compared to all its neighbouring countries Armenia has:

- the lowest coefficient of human inequality,
- the lowest gender inequality (ranked 55th on Gender Inequality Index),
- highest percentage of men and highest percentage of women with at least some secondary education,
- highest share of seats in parliament held by women,
- highest share of women who reported to feel safe,
- highest GDP growth rate.

Since 1990, Armenia recorded steady growth of average annual HDI scores in every reported period (1990–2000, 2000–2010, 2010–2017).

According to the 2016 Sustainable Society Index, Armenia has a higher rank of Human Wellbeing than all its neighbours. At the same time its Economic Wellbeing rank is below neighbouring countries.

The 2011 census counted 539,394 persons (19.4 percent of the population above 6 years of age) with higher professional education.

=== Structure of the population ===
The median age in 2020 was 36.6 years (male: 35.1, female: 38.3).

36.3 percent of women who gave birth in 2016 had higher education.

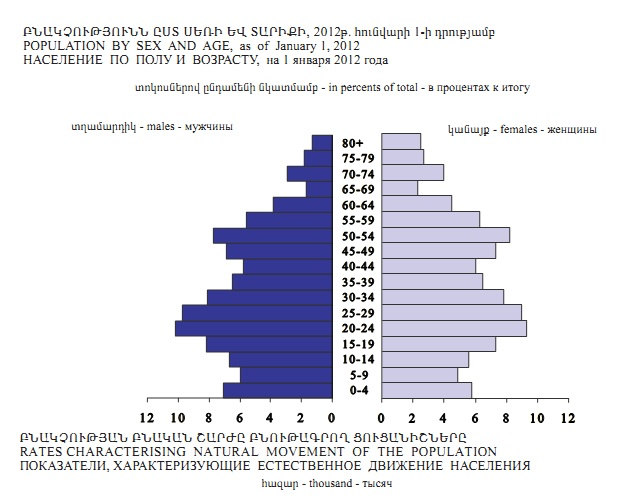
Pyramid Armenia 2012 http://www.armstat.am

Population by Sex and Age Group (Census 12.10.2011):

Age group	Male	Female	Total	%
Total	1,398,052	1,620,802	3,018,854	100
0–4	105 565	102 007	207 572	6.88
5–9	91 429	88 500	179 929	5.96
10–14	90 458	88 179	178 637	5.92
15–19	107 938	125 137	233 075	7.72
20–24	133 897	158 337	292 234	9.68
25–29	122 109	149 820	271 929	9.01
30–34	103 114	119 891	223 005	7.39
35–39	89 073	98 348	187 421	6.21
40–44	82 502	94 462	176 964	5.86
45–49	98 064	112 996	211 060	6.99
50–54	109 294	125 238	234 532	7.77
55–59	80 989	96 769	177 758	5.89
60–64	56 189	71 410	127 599	4.23
65–69	28 020	37 353	65 373	2.17
70–74	44 041	63 637	107 678	3.57
75–79	30 734	44 643	75 377	2.50
80–84	18 662	30 244	48 906	1.62
85+	5 974	13 831	19 805	0.66
Age group	Male	Female	Total	%
0–14	287 452	278 686	566 138	18.75
15–64	983 169	1 152 408	2 135 577	70.74
65+	127 431	189 708	317 139	10.51

Population Estimates by Sex and Age Group (01.VII.2019):

Age group	Male	Female	Total	%
Total	1 399 368	1 563 114	2 962 482	100
0–4	102 588	92 078	194 666	6.57
5–9	111 879	98 348	210 227	7.10
10–14	103 991	90 955	194 946	6.58
15–19	88 582	77 838	166 420	5.62
20–24	90 776	88 311	179 087	6.05
25–29	115 826	127 910	243 736	8.23
30–34	124 127	138 753	262 880	8.87
35–39	111 345	123 527	234 872	7.93
40–44	87 619	100 891	188 510	6.36
45–49	74 528	90 316	164 844	5.56
50–54	73 562	93 943	167 505	5.65
55–59	91 952	116 734	208 686	7.04
60–64	81 199	105 827	187 026	6.31
65–69	55 578	76 627	132 205	4.46
70–74	29 945	46 812	76 757	2.59
75–79	23 192	37 510	60 702	2.05
80–84	21 287	37 958	59 245	2.00
85+	11 392	18 776	30 168	1.02
Age group	Male	Female	Total	Percent
0–14	318 458	281 381	599 839	20.25
15–64	939 516	1 064 050	2 003 566	67.63
65+	141 394	217 683	359 077	12.12

In 2016, households with up to four members prevailed in urban areas throughout Armenia, with the share of such households coming to 70.2 percent in urban communities compared to 60.1 percent in rural communities.

View source data.
View source data.
View source data.
View source data.

== Vital statistics ==
=== Vital statistics summary data ===
Notable events in Armenian demographics:

- 1988 – Spitak earthquake
- 1991 – Dissolution of the Soviet Union
- 1988-1994 – First Nagorno-Karabakh War
- 2020 – Second Nagorno-Karabakh War
- 2020-2022 – COVID-19 Pandemic
- 2023 – Expulsion of Nagorno-Karabakh Armenians

	Average population	Live births	Deaths	Natural change	Crude birth rate (per 1000)	Crude death rate (per 1000)	Natural change (per 1000)	Crude migration rate (per 1000)	Total fertility rate	Infant mortality rate (per 1000 births)	Life expectancy		
	Average population	Live births	Deaths	Natural change	Crude birth rate (per 1000)	Crude death rate (per 1000)	Natural change (per 1000)	Crude migration rate (per 1000)	Total fertility rate	Infant mortality rate (per 1000 births)	males	females	total
1950	1,354,000	43,414	11,525	31,889	32.1	8.5	23.6						
1951	1,378,000	49,790	12,482	37,308	36.1	9.1	27.1	−9.4					
1952	1,415,000	53,845	12,916	40,929	38.1	9.1	28.9	−2.0					
1953	1,454,000	51,025	14,007	37,018	35.1	9.6	25.5	2.1					
1954	1,504,000	57,995	12,301	45,900	38.6	8.2	30.4	4.0					
1955	1,564,000	59,477	13,763	45,714	38.0	8.8	29.2	10.7					
1956	1,616,000	62,119	12,286	50,000	38.5	7.6	30.8	2.4					
1957	1,671,000	66,862	14,101	52,761	40.0	8.4	31.6	2.4					
1958	1,732,000	71,213	14,089	57,124	41.1	8.1	33.0	3.5					
1959	1,796,000	72,211	13,968	58,243	40.2	7.8	32.4	4.6					
1960	1,867,000	74,825	12,675	62,150	40.1	6.8	33.3	6.2	4.63				
1961	1,942,000	72,377	12,496	59,881	37.3	6.4	30.8	9.4	4.27				
1962	2,005,000	69,505	13,297	56,208	34.7	6.6	28.0	4.4	4.17				
1963	2,064,000	67,382	12,046	55,336	32.6	5.8	26.8	2.6	4.11				
1964	2,133,000	64,454	12,415	52,039	30.2	5.8	24.4	9.0	3.98				
1965	2,205,000	62,969	12,582	50,387	28.6	5.7	22.9	10.9	3.91				
1966	2,273,000	61,594	12,445	49,149	27.1	5.5	21.6	9.2	3.69				
1967	2,337,000	57,031	12,622	44,409	24.4	5.4	19.0	9.2	3.55				
1968	2,401,000	57,503	12,231	45,272	23.9	5.1	18.9	8.5	3.46				
1969	2,462,000	56,203	12,782	43,421	22.8	5.2	17.6	7.8	3.20				
1970	2,518,000	55,694	12,844	42,850	22.1	5.1	17.0	5.7	3.17				
1971	2,580,000	58,188	12,518	45,670	22.6	4.9	17.7	6.9	3.18				
1972	2,644,000	59,313	13,730	45,583	22.4	5.2	17.2	7.6	3.07				
1973	2,708,000	59,593	14,102	45,491	22.0	5.2	16.8	7.4	2.92				
1974	2,770,000	60,419	14,276	46,143	21.8	5.2	16.7	6.2	2.82				
1975	2,826,000	62,866	15,498	47,368	22.2	5.5	16.8	3.4	2.79				
1976	2,883,000	65,065	15,688	49,377	22.6	5.4	17.1	3.1	2.72				
1977	2,943,000	65,830	15,813	50,017	22.4	5.4	17.0	3.8	2.61				
1978	3,001,000	66,698	16,465	50,233	22.2	5.5	16.7	3.0	2.46				
1979	3,051,000	69,786	17,125	52,661	22.9	5.6	17.3	−0.6	2.38				
1980	3,096,000	70,324	17,124	53,200	22.7	5.5	17.2	−2.5	2.33				
1981	3,144,000	73,682	16,659	57,023	23.4	5.3	18.1	−2.1	2.31				
1982	3,194,000	74,225	17,469	56,756	23.2	5.5	17.8	−1.9	2.26				
1983	3,243,000	76,436	18,369	58,067	23.6	5.7	17.9	−2.6	2.35				
1984	3,292,000	79,767	19,043	60,724	24.2	5.8	18.4	−3.3	2.44				
1985	3,339,000	80,306	19,581	60,725	24.1	5.9	18.2	−3.9	2.56				
1986	3,387,000	81,192	19,410	61,782	24.0	5.7	18.2	−3.8	2.58				
1987	3,435,000	78,492	19,727	58,765	22.9	5.7	17.1	−2.9	2.55				
1988	3,453,000	74,707	35,567	39,140	21.6	10.3	11.3	−6.1	2.49				
1989	3,482,000	75,250	20,853	54,397	21.6	6.0	15.6	−7.2	2.61				
1990	3,545,000	79,882	21,993	57,889	22.5	6.2	16.3	1.8	2.63				
1991	3,604,000	77,825	23,425	54,400	21.6	6.5	15.1	1.5	2.60				
1992	3,549,000	70,581	25,824	44,757	19.9	7.3	12.6	−27.9	2.44				
1993	3,410,000	59,041	27,500	31,541	17.3	8.1	9.2	−48.4	2.14				
1994	3,309,000	51,143	24,648	26,495	15.5	7.4	8.0	−37.6	1.878				
1995	3,255,000	48,960	24,842	24,118	15.0	7.6	7.4	−23.7	1.842				
1996	3,247,000	48,134	24,936	23,198	14.8	7.7	7.1	−9.6	1.834				
1997	3,242,000	43,929	23,985	19,944	13.5	7.4	6.2	−7.7	1.680				
1998	3,235,000	39,366	23,210	16,156	12.2	7.2	5.0	−7.2	1.509				
1999	3,230,000	36,502	24,087	12,415	11.3	7.5	3.8	−5.3	1.388				
2000	3,221,000	34,276	24,025	10,251	10.6	7.5	3.2	−6.0	1.305				
2001	3,214,000	32,065	24,003	8,062	10.0	7.5	2.5	−4.7	1.239				
2002	3,205,000	32,229	25,554	6,675	10.1	8.0	2.1	−4.9	1.207				
2003	3,188,000	35,793	26,014	9,779	11.2	8.2	3.1	−8.4	1.349				
2004	3,172,000	37,520	25,679	11,841	11.8	8.1	3.7	−8.7	1.383				
2005	3,155,000	37,499	26,379	11,120	11.9	8.4	3.5	−8.9	1.366				
2006	3,139,000	37,639	27,202	10,437	12.0	8.7	3.3	−8.4	1.348	13.9	69.8	76.0	72.9
2007	3,122,000	40,105	26,830	13,275	12.8	8.6	4.3	−9.7	1.417	10.9	69.8	76.1	73.0
2008	3,106,000	41,185	27,412	13,773	13.3	8.8	4.4	−9.5	1.444	10.8	70.0	76.3	73.2
2009	3,089,000	44,466	27,528	16,938	14.4	8.9	5.5	−11.0	1.551	10.4	70.0	76.3	73.2
2010	3,073,000	44,825	27,921	16,904	14.6	9.1	5.5	−10.7	1.556	11.4	70.1	76.4	73.3
2011	3,056,000	43,340	27,963	15,377	14.2	9.1	5.0	−10.5	1.499	11.6	70.5	77.3	74.0
2012^{3}	3,037,000	42,480	27,599	14,881	14.0	9.1	4.9	−11.1	1.583	10.8	70.9	77.5	74.3
2013	3,022,000	41,770	27,165	14,605	13.8	9.0	4.8	−9.7	1.573	9.7	71.5	77.9	74.8
2014	3,014,000	43,183	27,196	15,987	14.3	9.0	5.3	−7.9	1.652	8.8	71.8	78.1	75.0
2015	3,007,000	41,763	27,878	13,885	13.9	9.3	4.6	−6.9	1.645	8.8	71.7	78.2	75.0
2016	2,998,000	40,592	28,226	12,366	13.5	9.4	4.2	−7.2	1.647	8.6	71.6	78.3	75.0
2017	2,986,000	37,700	27,157	10,543	12.7	9.2	3.5	−7.5	1.576	8.2	71.9	78.7	75.4
2018	2,973,000	36,574	25,751	10,823	12.3	8.7	3.6	−8.0	1.573	7.1	72.4	79.0	75.9
2019	2,965,000	36,041	26,186	9,855	12.2	8.8	3.4	−6.1	1.599	6.1	73.1	79.5	76.5
2020	2,959,000	36,353	36,433	−80	12.3	12.3	−0.0	−2.0	1.656	7.3	68.4	78.6	73.5
2021	2,964,000	36,623	34,388	2,235	12.4	11.6	0.8	0.9	1.710	6.9	67.4	77.4	72.4
2022	2,969,000	36,375	26,692	9,683	12.3	9.0	3.3	−1.6	1.738	6.7	71.4	78.3	75.1
2023	2,991,200	36,590	24,313	12,277	12.3	8.2	4.1	3.4	1.885	6.6	74.1	81.0	77.7
2024	3,075,800	33,648	25,576	8,072	11.1	8.4	2.7	25.2	1.714				
2025	3,086,600	32,042	25,564	6,478	10.4	8.3	2.1	2.8	1.631				
2026									1.58 (e)				

^{1} The numbers of life births and deaths until 1959 were calculated from the birth rate and death rate, respectively

^{2} The high number of deaths in 1988 is related to the Spitak earthquake, while in the rest of the 20th century the death rate was equal to the rate of other European countries (excluding England).

^{3} The population estimate for 2012 has been recalculated on the basis of the 2011 Census.

2024: https://armstat.am/file/article/population_01_07_24.pdf

=== Current vital statistics ===
Period	Live births	Deaths	Natural increase
January—September 2025	23,653	19,142	+4,511
January—September 2026	22,759	18,223	+4,536
Difference	▼ –894 (-3.8%)	▼ –919 (-4.8%)	▲ +25

=== Fertility rate ===
In 2016, natural increase of population comprised 12,366 persons and the crude rate of natural increase reached 4.1%, per 1000 population, decreasing by 0.4 percent compared to the previous year.

After double-digit crude natural increase rates between 1982 and 1992, rates did not exceed 5.5 after 1998. At a regional level, slightly better rates were recorded in the capital Yerevan, where the value of 5.5 is consistently being surpassed since 2009. Particularly weak is natural increase in Tavush and Syunik provinces, not much better off are Lori and Vayots Dzor provinces.

Fertility Rate (TFR) (Wanted Fertility Rate) and CBR (Crude Birth Rate):

Year	Total		Urban		Rural	
Year	CBR	TFR	CBR	TFR	CBR	TFR
2000	13.9	1.7 (1.5)	12.1	1.5 (1.3)	16.3	2.1 (1.7)
2005	14.6	1.7 (1.6)	14.5	1.6 (1.6)	14.9	1,8 (1,6)
2010	14.0	1.7 (1.6)	12.8	1.6 (1.5)	16.2	1.8 (1.8)
2015–2016	12.9	1.7 (1.7)	12.7	1.7 (1.6)	13.2	1.8 (1.8)

Armenia's Total Fertility Rate at 1.6 was lowest in the Caucasus region in 2017. TFR is expected to stay at 1.6 between 2015 and 2020, less from 1.7 in years 2010–2015.

The mean age of mothers at birth was 26.8 years and at first birth it was 24.7 years in 2016. Adolescent birth rate, as well as, share of women married aged 18 was lowest in Armenia compared to its neighbouring countries.

In 2016, infant mortality rate (in the first year of their life) was 8.6 per 1,000 live births.

A study revealed that population growth rate changes were more favourable in Armenia than in its surrounding countries between 2005 and 2015.

Since the 1960s, Armenia has the highest share of urban population among South Caucasus countries.

Birth rate by province
Province	TFR (2024)	CBR (2024)
Yerevan	1.180	8.5
Aragatsotn	2.190	13.4
Ararat	2.245	14.1
Armavir	2.154	13.5
Gegharkunik	2.126	12.5
Lori	2.031	11.6
Kotayk	1.987	12.6
Shirak	1.695	10.7
Syunik	2.367	12.9
Vayots Dzor	2.537	13.4
Tavush	2.019	11.4

==== Before 1950 ====
Years	1800	1801	1802	1803	1804	1805	1806	1807	1808	1809
Total Fertility Rate in Armenia	7.8	7.8	7.81	7.81	7.81	7.82	7.82	7.82	7.83	7.83

Years	1810	1811	1812	1813	1814	1815	1816	1817	1818	1819
Total Fertility Rate in Armenia	7.83	7.83	7.84	7.84	7.84	7.85	7.85	7.85	7.86	7.86

Years	1820	1821	1822	1823	1824	1825	1826	1827	1828	1829
Total Fertility Rate in Armenia	7.86	7.87	7.87	7.87	7.88	7.88	7.88	7.89	7.89	7.89

Years	1830	1831	1832	1833	1834	1835	1836	1837	1838	1839	1840
Total Fertility Rate in Armenia	7.89	7.9	7.9	7.9	7.91	7.91	7.91	7.92	7.92	7.92	7.93

Years	1841	1842	1843	1844	1845	1846	1847	1848	1849	1850
Total Fertility Rate in Armenia	7.93	7.93	7.94	7.94	7.94	7.95	7.95	7.95	7.95	7.96

Years	1851	1852	1853	1854	1855	1856	1857	1858	1859	1860
Total Fertility Rate in Armenia	7.96	7.96	7.97	7.97	7.97	7.98	7.98	7.98	7.99	7.99

Years	1861	1862	1863	1864	1865	1866	1867	1868	1869	1870
Total Fertility Rate in Armenia	7.99	8	8	8	8.01	8.01	8.01	8.01	8.02	8.02

Years	1871	1872	1873	1874	1875	1876	1877	1878	1879	1880
Total Fertility Rate in Armenia	8.02	8.03	8.03	8.03	8.04	8.04	8.04	8.05	8.05	8.05

Years	1881	1882	1883	1884	1885	1886	1887	1888	1889	1890
Total Fertility Rate in Armenia	8.06	8.06	8.06	8.07	8.07	8.07	8.07	8.08	8.08	8.08

Years	1891	1892	1893	1894	1895	1896	1897	1898	1899	1900
Total Fertility Rate in Armenia	8.09	8.09	8.09	8.1	8.1	8.09	8.08	8.07	8.06	8.05

Years	1901	1902	1903	1904	1905	1906	1907	1908	1909	1910
Total Fertility Rate in Armenia	8.04	8.03	8.02	8.01	8	7.99	7.98	7.97	7.96	7.95

Years	1911	1912	1913	1914	1915	1916	1917	1918	1919	1920
Total Fertility Rate in Armenia	7.94	7.93	7.92	7.91	7.9	7.89	7.88	7.87	7.86	7.85

Years	1921	1922	1923	1924	1925	1926	1927	1928	1929	1930
Total Fertility Rate in Armenia	7.84	7.83	7.82	7.81	7.8	7.65	7.5	7.34	7.19	7.04

Years	1931	1932	1933	1934	1935	1936	1937	1938	1939	1940
Total Fertility Rate in Armenia	6.89	6.74	6.58	6.43	6.28	6.13	5.98	5.82	5.67	5.52

Years	1941	1942	1943	1944	1945	1946	1947	1948	1949	1950
Total Fertility Rate in Armenia	4.56	3.34	1.82	1.74	2.39	3.58	4.1	3.63	4.05	4.13

=== Life expectancy ===
Life expectancy in Armenia since 1950

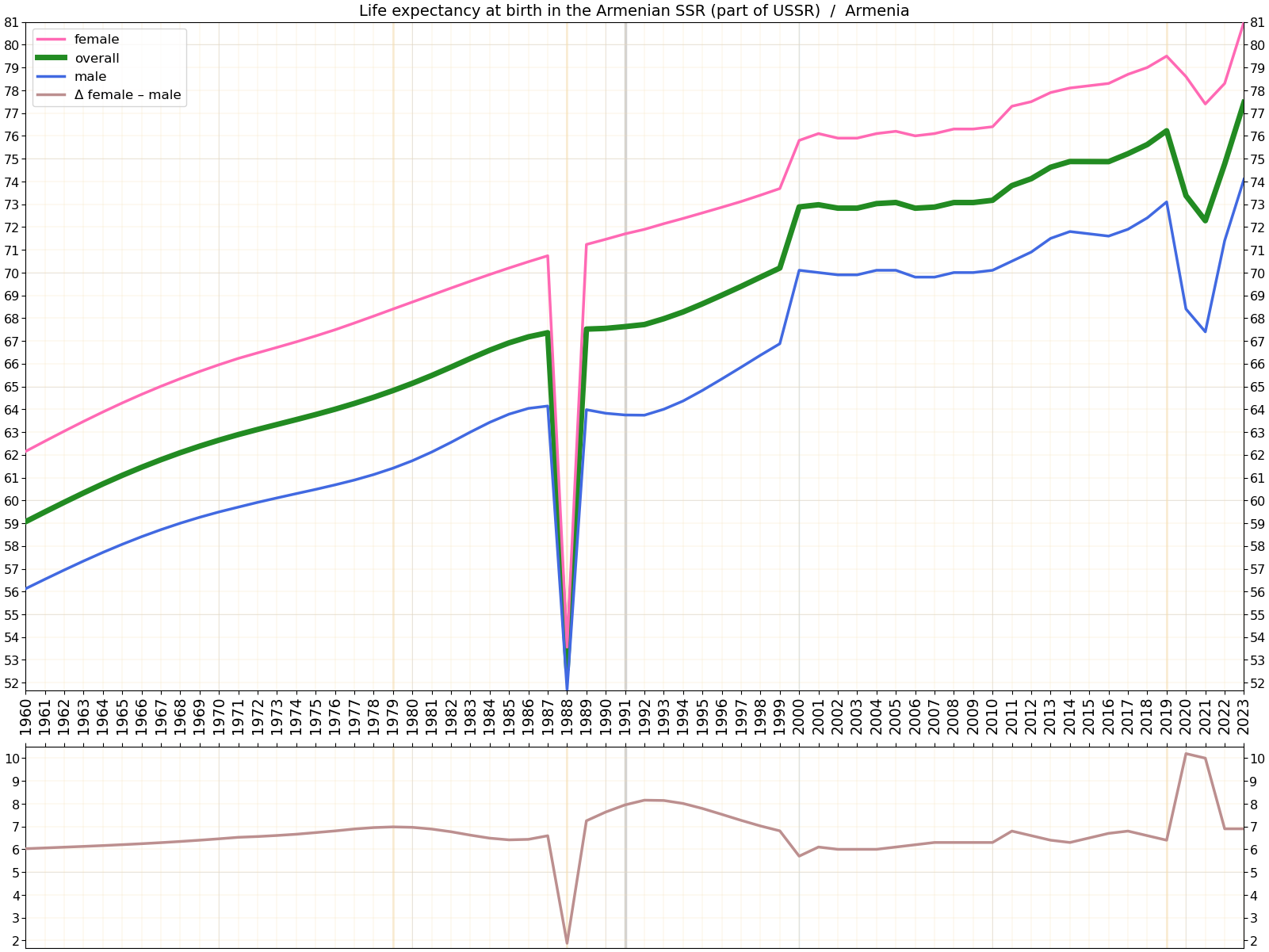
Life expectancy in Armenia since 1960 by gender

According to the 2018 HDI statistical update, compared to all its neighbouring countries Armenia has the highest health expenditures as percentage of its GDP and the highest healthy life expectancy at birth.

In 2016, the average life expectancy at birth for males was 71.6 years and for females was 78.3 years, with the average at 75.0 years.

After a setback during 1986–1996, mostly due to the Spitak earthquake, and the First Nagorno-Karabakh War, Armenia regained its position and was consistently among the top three former Soviet republics during 1997–2016, topping the list in 2007.

During the Soviet period, life expectancy was traditionally high in Armenia and topped all other republics of the USSR, and most other countries in Eastern Europe between 1978 and 1980.

Period	Life expectancy in Years	Period	Life expectancy in Years
1950–1955	62.8	1985–1990	68.4
1955–1960	64.9	1990–1995	68.1
1960–1965	67.0	1995–2000	70.2
1965–1970	69.2	2000–2005	72.4
1970–1975	70.8	2005–2010	72.7
1975–1980	70.6	2010–2015	74.0
1980–1985	70.9		

Source: UN

== Ethnic groups ==
Population of ethnic groups in Armenia in 1926–2022
Ethnic group	census 1926^{1}		census 1939^{2}		census 1959^{3}		census 1970^{4}		census 1979^{5}		census 1989^{6}		census 2001^{7}		census 2011^{8}		census 2022^{9}	
Ethnic group	#	%	#	%	#	%	#	%	#	%	#	%	#	%	#	%	#	%
Armenians	743,571	84.5	1,061,997	82.8	1,551,610	88.0	2,208,327	88.6	2,724,975	89.7	3,083,616	93.3	3,145,354	97.9	2,961,514	98.1	2,875,697	98.1
Yazidis	12,237	1.4	20,481	1.6	25,627	1.5	37,486	1.5	50,822	1.7	56,127	1.7	40,620	1.3	35,272	1.2	31,077	1.1
Kurds	2,973	0.3	20,481	1.6	25,627	1.5	37,486	1.5	50,822	1.7	56,127	1.7	1,519	0.0	2,131	0.1	1,663	0.1
Russians	19,548	2.2	51,464	4.0	56,464	3.2	66,108	2.7	70,336	2.3	51,555	1.6	14,660	0.5	11,862	0.4	14,074	0.5
Assyrians	2,215	0.3	3,280	0.3	4,326	0.2	5,544	0.2	6,183	0.2	5,963	0.2	3,409	0.1	2,769	0.1	2,754	0.1
Ukrainians	2,286	0.3	5,496	0.4	5,593	0.3	8,390	0.3	8,900	0.3	8,341	0.3	1,633	0.1	1,176	0.0	1,005	0.0
Greeks	2,980	0.3	4,181	0.3	4,976	0.3	5,690	0.2	5,653	0.2	4,650	0.1	1,176	0.0	900	0.0	365	0.0
Georgians	274	0.0	652	0.1	816	0.0	1,439	0.1	1,314	0.0	1,364	0.0	694	0․0	974	0.0	223	0.0
Azerbaijanis	76,870	8.7	130,896	10.2	107,748	6.1	148,189	5.9	160,841	5.3	84,860	2.6	29	0․0				
Jews	335	0.0	512	0.0	1,024	0.1	1,047	0.0	959	0.0	720	0.0	109	0․0	127	0․0	118	0.0
Others	18,001	2.0	3,379	0.3	4,864	0.3	9,653	0.4	7,276	0.2	7,580	0.2	3,808	0.1	2,129	0.1	5,508	0.2
Total	880,464		1,282,338		1,763,048		2,491,873		3,037,259		3,304,776		3,213,011		3,018,854		2,932,731	
^{1} Source: . ^{2} Source: . ^{3} Source: . ^{4} Source: . ^{5} Source: . ^{6} Source: . ^{7} Source: ^{8} Source:

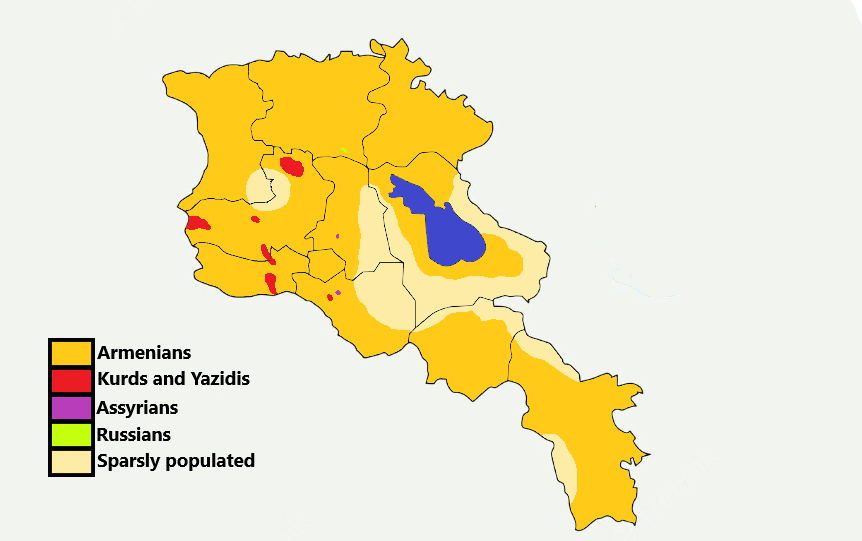
Ethnic map of Armenia

Ethnic groups of Armenia (2022 census)
1. Armenians (98.1%)
2. Yazidis (1.10%)
3. Kurds (0.10%)
4. Assyrians (0.10%)
5. Russians (0.50%)
6. Others (0.10%)

In 2022, ethnic minorities included Russians, Assyrians, Ukrainians, Yazidis, Kurds, Iranians, Greeks, Georgians, and Belarusians. There were also smaller communities of Vlachs, Mordvins, Ossetians, Udis, and Tats. Minorities of Poles and Caucasus Germans also exist, though they are heavily Russified.

== Languages ==
Armenian is the sole official language.

As per 2022 census data, Armenian is the most widely spoken language at 99%, Kurdish at 1%, Russian at 65% and English at 5%.

Armenia is a member of La Francophonie, and hosted its annual summit in 2018.

The largest communities of the Armenian diaspora, are fluent in Russian and English.

Population of Armenia by Native Language
Year	2001 census		2011 census		2022 census	
Language	Number	%	Number	%	Number	%
Armenian	3,139,152	97.70	2,956,615	97.94	2,875,697	98.06
Yezidi	31,799	0.99	30,973	1.03	31,079	1.06
Russian	29,563	0.92	23,484	0.78	14,076	0.48
Assyrian			2,402	0.08	2,755	0.09
Kurdish			2,030	0.07	1,663	0.06
Ukrainian	818	0.03	733	0.02	1,005	0.03
Others/No Answer	11,679	0.36	2,617	0.09	6,456	0.22
Total	3,213,011		3,018,854		2,932,731	

Population of Armenia by Proficient Language, 2011
Language	Native	Non-Native	Total % Proficient
Armenian	2,956,615	43,420	99.45
Yezidi	30,973	5,370	1.2
Russian	23,484	1,591,246	53.53
Ukrainian	733	1,151	0.06
Assyrian	2,402	1,468	0.13
Kurdish	2,030	1,309	0.11
English	491	107,922	3.59
French		10,106	0.33

== Religions ==
Most Armenians are Christians, primarily of the Apostolic Church rite. Armenia is considered the first nation to officially adopt Christianity, which was first preached in Armenia by two Apostles of Jesus, St. Bartholomew and St. Thaddeus in the 1st century. The Armenian Apostolic Church can trace its roots back to the 3rd and 4th centuries. The country formally adopted the Christian faith in 301 A.D. Over 90 percent of Armenians belong to the Armenian Apostolic Church. Armenia also has a population of Catholics and Evangelical Protestants.

According to the 2022 Armenian census, number of adherents of primary religions in Armenia are the following: 2,793,042 (95.2%) Armenian Apostolic, 15,836 (0.5%) Evangelical, 14,349 (0.5%) Yazidism, 17,884 (0.6%) Armenian and Roman (Latin) Catholic, 6,316 (0.2%) Eastern Orthodox, 5,282 (0.2%) Jehovah's Witness, 2,000 (0.1%) Molokan (non-Orthodox Russians), 524 Assyrian Church of the East (Nestorian), 2,132 Paganism, 515 Islam, 118 Judaism, 204 Hare Krishna, 7675 others. 17,501 (0.6%) people chose "no religion" and 49,353 people chose (1.7%) "no response".

== Emigration ==
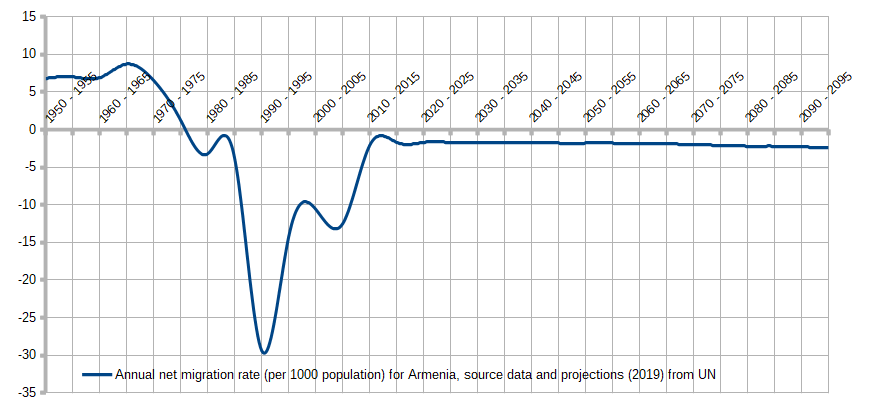
Annual net migration rate (per 1000 population). Source data and projections (2019) from UN.

Compared to its neighbouring countries, Armenia has the highest share of immigrants (6.5 percent of total population, 2017 data).

The estimated number of population net migration is −24.8 thousand persons, according to the Integrated living conditions survey of households of 2016; for urban population −13.8 thousand and for rural population −11.0 thousand persons.

24.9% of households were involved in external and internal migration processes over the period of 2013– 2016. Migration directions were distributed as follows: 12% – internal, 10.5% – Republic of Artsakh, rest (76.4%) – international (of which 89.8% – Russia). Among household members of age 15 and above, who left their permanent residence in 2013–2016 for 3 months and longer and had not returned as of 2016, 11.9% were in Armenia, 13.0% in Artsakh, and 75.1% in other countries, predominantly in Russia. More than 54% of migrant household members of the age 15 years and above sent money and/ or goods to their families/relatives/friends within 12 months preceding the survey.

According to 2019 UN data, the emigration rate averaged annually around 1.7 per 1000 inhabitants in years 2015–2020 and is expected to remain the same until year 2045. These are below average emigration rate of 11.5 per 1000 in years 2000–2010 and even below the emigration rate of 3.2 per 1000 in years 1980–1985.

=== Migration during post-Soviet period ===
It is estimated that 740,000–1,300,000 people left Armenia between 1988 and 2005.

Economically recessed situation in Armenia during the 1990s enhanced the emigration of 125,000 refugees and displaced persons. Human and natural disasters also caused approximately 192,000 individuals to become internally displaced persons in Armenia. Among the disasters, the major impact was the 1988 Spitak earthquake.

After the collapse of the Soviet Union, borders that were once formal, now assumed real significance. Nonetheless, increased political, inter-ethnic, and social tensions prompted more and more people to migrate between Armenia and its neighbouring countries. As a result, approximately 100,000 persons or 3 percent of the country's population emigrated during the beginning of 1990s.

Refugees and forcibly displaced persons started arriving to Armenia in spring 1988 and continued coming until late 1991. During this time, Armenia gave shelter to approximately 419,000 refugees and displaced persons, 360,000 of whom migrated from Azerbaijan. The rest immigrated from other regions of the former Soviet Union.

419.000 people migrated to Armenia during the post-Soviet period
1. Refugees from Azerbaijan (86.0%)
2. Refugees from Nagorno-Karabakh (7.00%)
3. Persons Forcibly displaced (3.00%)
4. Refugees from Shahumyan (bordering Nagorno-Karabakh) (4.00%)

Migration flows during the post-soviet period can be divided into 3 stages:

- The first stage, prior to 1995, was characterized by mass emigration due to economic reasons, a drop in living standards, and a rapid deterioration in the delivery and quality of public utilities. It is estimated that over 800,000 people emigrated from Armenia during this period and that only 400,000 of them have returned since then.
- During the second stage, from 1995 to 2001, emigration decreased, with most of those leaving to be labour migrants in search of better economic and social opportunities. 180,000 people (6 per cent of the population) emigrated from Armenia during these six years These emigrants tended to resettle abroad permanently and were later joined by relatives through family reunification.
- The third stage, from 2002 to the present, is marked by a constant yearly increase in the number of persons travelling to and from Armenia. This stage was also characterized by a shift to a positive migration balance.

According to government records, over 55 per cent of all emigrants are unmarried and 60 per cent are males between the ages of 20 and 44 (very few are children and even fewer are elderly people). Most have an educational level far higher than the national average and have no intention of returning to Armenia. Although no hard data exists, emigrant families appear to be even less likely to return.

The emigration of the major part of the Armenian population has brought about important changes. For example, a decrease in the number of people of reproductive age in Armenia has led to a progressive drop in marriages and birth rates. There has also been a considerable change in the ethnic composition of the population in Armenia due to a higher rate of emigration among ethnic minorities.

== Immigration ==
=== Migration data ===
Armenia Migration Data (2010–present)
Year	RA – Total Arrived	RA – Total Departed	Net Migration – Total	International Migration – Arrived	International Migration – Departed
2010	32,500	69,800	−37,300	18,300	55,600
2011	30,900	59,400	−28,500	17,800	46,300
2012	29,300	38,700	−9,400	19,500	28,900
2013	19,800	44,200	−24,400	12,300	36,700
2014	17,400	39,200	−21,800	10,700	32,500
2015	19,500	45,400	−25,900	10,600	36,500
2016	15,900	40,800	−24,900	8,100	33,000
2017	13,300	37,300	−24,000	9,200	33,200
2018	15,300	33,586	−18,286	10,100	28,386
2019	15,800	31,200	−15,400	12,100	27,500
2020	36,600	33,200	3,400	10,800	7,400
2021	19,205	23,324	−4,119	10,120	14,239
2022	29,585	23,505	6,080	15,400	9,320
2023	78,500	37,100	41,400	48,300	6,900

== Wealth and poverty ==
=== Inequality ===
Out of 41 emerging economies, Armenia was among only four, which recorded rising inequality (measured by Gini coefficient) in years 2007–2015.

=== Wealth ===
According to Global Wealth Report, prepared by Credit Suisse, mean wealth per adult in Armenia in 2019 is estimated at $19,517 (rising 9 times from estimated $2,177 in year 2000). Mean wealth per adult in Armenia surpasses corresponding values for neighboring countries Georgia and Azerbaijan by over 50%, all CIS countries except Russia and Kazakhstan, and neighboring Iran. Growth rate of mean wealth per adult between 2000 and 2019 with the value of 9 times beats all neighboring countries, most of CIS countries as well as Estonia, Latvia and Lithuania.

Median wealth per adult is reported at $8,309 in 2019, above the world average, rising 9.6 times from $862 in year 2000.

Between 2000 and 2019, average debts per adult grew 28.7 times to $1,261, or 6.5% of wealth per adult (below the 11.9% world average).

55% of adults own less than $10,000, 42.7% — $10,000–$100,000, 2.2% — $100,000–$1 million and 0.1% — over $1 million. The share of adults owning less than $10,000 with the value of 55% is less than corresponding value in each of CIS countries, neighboring Iran and Turkey, as well as the world average. Gini coefficient for wealth is reported at 66.3%, less than 82.4% the European average and 88.5% the world average.

=== Poverty ===
As much as 53.5% of the country's population was officially considered poor in 2004. Poverty fell significantly in the following years amid double-digit economic growth that came to an end due to the 2008 financial crisis. It soared to almost 36% in 2010, one year after Armenia's Gross Domestic Product shrunk by over 14%. Afterwards, there was a decreasing trend throughout the last years reaching 23.5% in 2018, down from 25.7% in 2017.

The poverty indicators in Shirak, Lori, Kotayk, Tavush and Armavir provinces are higher than the country average. The highest poverty rate in the country has been recorded in Shirak province, where 46% of the population is below the poverty line. To overcome poverty, Armenia would need AMD 63.2 billion, or an amount equal to 1.2% of GDP, in addition to the resources already allocated for social assistance, assuming that such assistance would be efficiently targeted to the poor.

In terms of the international poverty line corresponding to US$1.25 in 2005 PPP, poverty in Armenia went down from 19.3% in the year 2001 to 1.5% in the year 2008 and remained nearly unchanged until the year 2015 moving in the range of 1.5% – 2.7%.

== See also ==
- Assyrians in Armenia
- Censuses of Armenia
- Demographics of the Republic of Artsakh
- Ethnic minorities in Armenia
- Greeks in Armenia
- Health in Armenia
- Kurds in Armenia
- List of European countries by population
- Lom people
- Peoples of the Caucasus
- Russians in Armenia
- Social protection in Armenia
- Yazidis in Armenia

== Bibliography ==
- Allerton Kilbourne Matossian, Mary (1962). The Impact of Soviet Policies in Armenia. E.J. Brill.
- Bloxham, Donald (2005). The Great Game of Genocide: Imperialism, Nationalism, and the Destruction of the Ottoman Armenians. Oxford: Oxford University Press. ISBN 0-19-927356-1. OCLC 57483924.
- Herzig, Edmund; Kurkchiyan, Marina (2005). The Armenians: Past and Present in the Making of National Identity. London: RoutledgeCurzon. pp. 66 & 115–117. ISBN 0-203-00493-0. OCLC 229988654.
- Hovhannisian, Sen (1 January 2019). Atlas of Armenia. Yerevan: Nahapet. p. 242. ISBN 978-9939-856-52-0. OCLC 1124982334.
- Korkotyan, Zaven (1932). Խորհրդային Հայաստանի բնակչությունը վերջին հարյուրամյակում (1831-1931) [The population of Soviet Armenia in the last century (1831–1931)] (PDF) (in Armenian). Yerevan: Pethrat. Archived from the original (PDF) on 2 February 2022.
- Mirzoyan, Gamlet (2009). "Sovetskiyi praviteli Armenii. Grigory Arutunov". Noyev Kovcheg. 3. Archived from the original on 5 March 2016.
- Pipes, Richard (1959). "Demographic and Ethnographic Changes in Transcaucasia, 1897-1956". Middle East Journal. 13 (1). Middle East Institute: 41–63. JSTOR 4323084.
- "Постановление N 754 Совета министров СССР «О мероприятиях по переселению колхозников и другого азербайджанского населения из Армянской ССР в Кура-Араксинскую низменность Азербайджанской ССР» от 10 марта 1948 г." www.hrono.info.
- Sarkisyanz, Manuel (1975). A Modern History of Transcaucasian Armenia: Social, Cultural and Political. ISBN 978-90-04-05911-5.
