= Gerger Russkiy =

Gerger Russkiy ("Russian Gerger") may refer to:

- Garrgarr, Armenia
- Pushkino, Armenia
