= Chorlu =

Chorlu may refer to:

- Çorlu, Turkey
- Lernantsk, Armenia, formerly Chorlu
