= Ethnic minorities in Armenia =

The population of Armenia includes various significant minority ethnic groups.

== Demographic trends in modern history of Armenia ==
According to last census, ethnic minorities in Armenia consist of less than 2% of the population. Various sources suggest different numbers, and even some of the representatives of the ethnic minorities are not informed about exact numbers. However, migration waves from Armenia always included representatives of various ethnic minorities, and as their leaders suggest, migration will continue from Armenia despite considerable improvements in the economic and political situation in Armenia.

Ethnic group	1989 Soviet census	2001 Armenian census	2011 Armenian census	2022 Armenian census
Yazidis	56,127	40,620	35,272	31,077
Russians	51,555	14,660	11,862	14,074
Assyrians	5,963	3,409	2,769	2,754
Ukrainians	8,341	1,633	1,176	1,005
Greeks	4,650	1,176	900	365
Jews	676		127	N/A
Persians	14	326	N/A	434
Georgians	1,364		974	223
Belorussians	1,061		214	N/A
Azerbaijanis	84,860	29	N/A	N/A
Poles			124	N/A
Germans			33	N/A
Kurds			2,131	1,663
Other			1,658	4,889
Unspecified			100	550
Total	221,160	67,657	55,582	57,034

While Armenians formed a consistent majority, Azerbaijanis were the second largest population in the republic during Soviet rule (forming about 2.5% in 1989). However, due to hostilities with neighboring Azerbaijan over the disputed region of Nagorno-Karabakh virtually all Azeris emigrated from Armenia. Conversely, Armenia received a large influx of Armenian refugees from Azerbaijan, thus giving Armenia a more homogeneous character. This forceful population exchange also affected the Christian Udi people of Azerbaijan, many of whom were perceived as Armenians due to close cultural ties between both peoples. The number of Udis residing in Armenia has increased from 19 in 1989 to about 200 by 2006.

Additionally since independence, several other ethnic groups have emigrated especially Russians (who decreased from 51,555 persons in 1989 to 14,660 in 2001), Ukrainians (8,341 in 1989 to 1,633 in 2001), Armeno-Tat, Greeks (4,650 in 1989 to 1,176 in 2001), and Belarusians (1,061 in 1989 to 160 in 2001). The numbers of Kurds, Armeno-Tats and Assyrians have remained consistent for the most part (though approximately 2,000 Assyrians have left Armenia between 1989 and 2001). Georgians have also historically been counted among the largest ethnic groups in modern Armenia, though it is likely that their numbers have dropped substantially since the 1989 Soviet census when they numbered 1,364 persons.

== Demographics ==
Armenia is the only republic of the former Soviet Union that boasts a nearly-homogeneous population. It is also the second-most densely populated post-Soviet state after Moldova. Ethnic minorities include Russians, Assyrians, Ukrainians, Kurds, Greeks, Georgians, and Belarusians. Smaller communities of Vlachs, Mordvins, Ossetians, Udis and Armeno-Tats also exist. Minorites of Poles and Caucasus Germans are also present, though they are heavily Russified.

Ethnic composition of the territory of modern-day Armenia
Ethnic group	1831	1873	1886	1897	1922	1926 (Note: Slightly differs from the results of the 1926 Soviet census in the Armenian SSR due to minor territorial adjustments within the Transcaucasian SFSR.)	1931	1939	1959	1970	1979	1989	2001	2011	2022
Armenians	110,671	329,266	430,865	510,855	671,279	743,571	883,348	1,061,997	1,551,610	2,208,327	2,724,975	3,083,616	3,145,354	2,961,514	2,875,697
Azerbaijanis (Note: Includes "Muslims" in 1831 and 1897; Classified as "Tatars" before 1918; Classified as "Turks" or "Turko-Tatars" after 1918; Known as Azerbaijanis after 1936.)	50,274	132,125	160,963	240,323	77,767	77,655	105,838	130,896	107,748	148,189	160,841	84,860	29	0	
Kurds	50,274	34,749	44,005	240,323	33,006	60,064	61,447	20,481	25,627	37,486	50,822	56,127	1,519	2,131	1,663
Yazidis	802	34,749	44,005	46,675 (Note: Included 25,874 respondents of an Orthodox faith—Mainly Russians, Ukrainians, Greeks, and Georgians.)	33,006	60,064	61,447	20,481	25,627	37,486	50,822	56,127	40,620	35,272	31,077
Russians	802	34,749	44,005	46,675	33,006	60,064	61,447	51,464	56,477	66,108	70,336	51,555	14,660	11,862	14,074
Ukrainians	802	34,749	44,005	46,675	33,006	60,064	61,447	5,496	5,593	8,390	8,900	8,341	1,633	1,176	1,005
Assyrians	802	34,749	44,005	46,675	33,006	60,064	61,447	3,280	4,326	5544	6,183	5,963	3,409	2,769	2,754
Greeks	802	34,749	44,005	46,675	33,006	60,064	61,447	4,181	4,976	5,690	5,653	4,650	1,176	900	365
Georgians	802	34,749	44,005	46,675	33,006	60,064	61,447	652	816	1,439	1,314	1,364	249	974	223
Others	802	34,749	44,005	46,675	33,006	60,064	61,447	3,891	5,875	10,700	8,235	8,300	4,362	2,256	5,873
TOTAL	161,747	496,140	635,833	797,853	782,052	881,290	1,050,633	1,282,338	1,763,048	2,491,873	3,037,259	3,304,776	3,213,011	3,018,854	2,932,731

=== Azerbaijanis ===
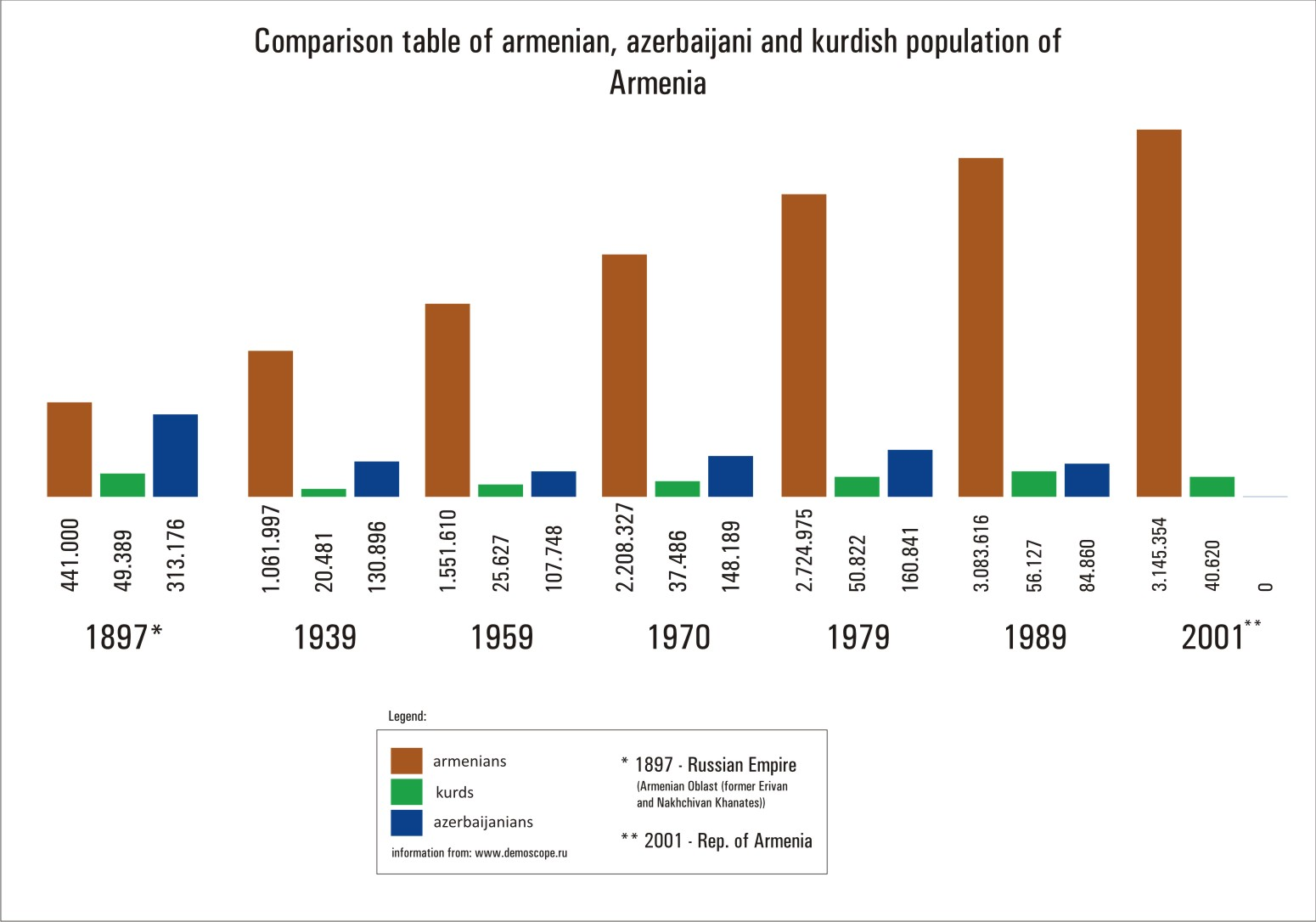
Comparison table of Armenian, Azerbaijani and Kurdish population of Armenia

The Azerbaijanis community in Armenia in the 20th century, represented a large number but have been virtually non-existent since 1988–1991. Most Azerbaijanis fled the country as a result of the First Nagorno-Karabakh War and the ongoing conflict between Armenia and Azerbaijan. UNHCR estimates the current population of Azerbaijanis in Armenia to be somewhere between 30 and a few hundred persons, with majority of them living in rural areas and being members of mixed couples (mostly mixed marriages), as well as elderly and sick. Most of them are also reported to have changed their names and maintain a low profile to avoid discrimination.

=== Yazidis ===
Yazids constitute largest ethnic minority in Armenia. The Yazidis, are an officially registered ethnic religion who live in the west of Armenia and are adherents of Yazidism.

=== Kurds ===
The Kurds in Armenia are an ethnic and religious minority in the country.

=== Russians ===
Ethnic Russians are the second largest ethnic community in Armenia after the Yazidis, with their number at 14,600. Even in the days of the Soviet Union, the days of the Armenian Soviet Socialist Republic, the country had the smallest percentage of Russians compared to the other 14 republics. Although some ethnic Russians left the country after independence, because of economic hardship and better opportunities, there is some flux of new ethnic Russians arriving for commercial considerations and also due to the Russian invasion of Ukraine.

There are a number of Russian-language publications in the Republic, including the dailies "Golos Armenii", "Novoye Vremia" and "Respublika Armenia" and the weekly "Delovoi Expres".

The educational system also uses Russian in many domains.

==== Russian Sectarians ====
Vestiges of different tribes of Spiritual Christians from Russia remain active in Armenia.

The first mass-immigration of Russians into Armenia occurred about 1840 when thousands of heterodox Spiritual Christians in central Russia and Novorossiya, and other non-Orthodox tribes were resettled in this newly conquered territory. "By ordering this migration in 1830, Nicholas I attempted at once to cleanse Russian Orthodoxy of heresies and to populate the newly annexed lands with ethnic Slavs who would shoulder the burden of imperial construction." About 5000 of descendants remain in the country.

The largest group today are a family of new religious movements that converted to the Dukh-i-zhiznik faiths which were imported from Los Angeles, California, USA, in the 1930s after delivery of a controversial religious text: Kniga solntse, dukh i zhin' (Book of the Sun, Spirit and Life). This 1928 book uniquely identifies them, and is placed on their altar table as a Third Testament next to their Russian Bible. About two-thirds of the book is instructions and rituals written by a presbyter prophet Maksim Rudomyotkin from the current village of Fioletovo while he was incarcerated at a monastery in the mid-1800s. There are about 15 distinct congregations of Dukh-i-zhizniki in Armenia, at least five in Fioletovo, five in north Yerevan, and one each in Dilijan and Lermontovo. Dukh-i-zhizniki are descendants of converted Pryguny, Maksimisty, Sionisty, Noviy Israeli, some Molokane, a few Armenians, Popovtsy, and other ecstatic religious tribes that resettled from Russia in the 1800s. Since perestroika at least 40 have migrated to join Dukh-i-zhizniki in America and Australia to enhance dying congregations with Russian-speakers.

The Molokans (Russian: Молока́не) were among the first to arrive and their label is commonly used by the non-Molokan tribes to hide their heretic (sectarian) faiths. Malakan is a common word indigenous to the Caucasus to label the intruding Russian settlers in the 1800s, no matter who they were, because the first to arrive in large numbers came from Molochna and it was an easy unique word to use.

Subbotniki, the Saturday people, settled in Sevan where their grave-markers are characterized by Jewish symbols.

Most of the sectarians from Russia were originally heterodox, rejected the Trinity as outlined by the Nicene Creed, disobeyed Orthodox fasts, military service, adhered to Old Testament kosherlike dietary laws and avoid do not eat pork, shellfish, or other unclean foods. They also refuse many accepted Christian practices, including water baptism. Approximately 5,000 heritage Russian sectarians live in Armenia in year 2000. Most encourage endogamy, even seeking mates in Russia and abroad.

=== Assyrians ===
Assyrians are a historic presence in Armenia from very ancient times. Assyrians are the third biggest minority in Armenia after the Yazidis and Russians. Their number is estimated at 5,000. There has been a higher rate of intermarriage between the Assyrians and the Armenians.

According to the 2001 census, there are 3,409 Assyrians living in Armenia, and Armenia is home to some of the last surviving Assyrian communities outside the middle east. There were 6,000 Assyrians in Armenia before the breakup of USSR, but because of Armenia's struggling economy, the population has been cut by half, as many have emigrated to Russian areas.

Assyrians are a Christian Semitic people, Aramaic speakers who are descendants of the ancient Assyrians and Babylonians

=== Greeks ===
The Greeks of Armenia are mainly descendants of Pontic Greeks, who originally lived along the shores of the Black Sea. Armenians and Greeks have co-existed for centuries.

=== Armeno-Tats ===
Christian Tats (Armenian: hay-tater) are a distinct group of Tat-speaking Armenians that historically populated eastern parts of the South Caucasus.

=== Ukrainians ===
The origin of the Ukrainians in Armenia goes back to the mid 19th century after the migration to Transcaucasia “the Cossacks from Minor Russia” to seal the Empire's Southern borders. The migrants worked mostly in agriculture.

=== Jews ===
Jews in Armenia are ethnic / religious Jews living in Armenia. There are about 300–500 Jews presently living in Armenia, mainly in the capital Yerevan. Although the contemporary relations between Israel and Armenia are normally good. The Jews have their religious leaders in Armenia headed by a Chief Rabbi and sociopolitical matters are run by the Jewish Council of Armenia.

=== Poles ===
Poles in Armenia are Armenian citizens who have Polish ancestry or Polish immigrants to Armenia. They make up the same population as Russians, Caucasus Germans, Italians, and Scandinavians. Some of them are born to one parent from Poland and one parent from Armenia and some of them have grandparents from Poland. They live in Amrakits, Gyumri, Vanadzor, and Yerevan. 33 of them live there. They have a school called European School in Armenia. They speak Armenian and some Polish.

=== Udis ===
The Udis (the self-name Udi, Uti) – are one of the most ancient native peoples of Caucasus as they are considered to be the descendants of the people of Caucasian Albania.

Udis reside in Azerbaijan, Georgia, Russia, Ukraine and Armenia. In Armenia, they number around 200.

The Udi language belongs to the Nakho-Dagestanian group of the Caucasian languages. There are two primary dialects named Nij and Vartashen. Azeri, Russian, Georgian languages are also spoken.

Most Udis belong to the Orthodox Church. Centuries of life in the sphere of Perso-Islamic culture made a relevant impact on the Udi culture and mentality. This trace is noticeable in Udi folk traditions and the material culture.

Most Udis speak Udi language that is a member of the Northeast Caucasian language family. Udi is related to Lezgian and Tabasaran.

It is believed this was the main language of Caucasian Albania, which stretched from south Dagestan to current day Azerbaijan. The language is spoken by about 5,000 people including in the villages of Debedavan, Bagratashen, Ptghavan, and Haghtanak in the Tavush province of Armenia and in the village of Zinobiani (Oktomberi) in the Kvareli district of the Kakheti province in Georgia.

Versions of Udi were written in Armenian alphabet and the Georgian alphabet.

== Organizations of ethnic minorities ==
List of organizations of the ethnic minorities of Armenia.

Union of ethnic minorities NGOs
Number	Name	Ethnic minority
1	youth center "Ashur"	Assyrians
2	"Pontos" organization	Greeks
3	"Rosia"	Russians
4	"Slavonakan tun" ("Slavic home")	Belarusians
5	"Association of Ukrainians"	Ukrainians
6	"National Union of Yezidis of RA"	Yezidi
7	"Menora" cultural center	Jews
8	"organization Mordechai Navi"	Jews
Union of ethnic minorities NGOs
1	"Atur" union	Assyrians
2	"Polonia" union	Poles
3	"Harmonia" cultural center	Russians
4	"Oda"	Russians
5	"Oda luch"	Russians
6	"Belarus"	Belarusians
7	"Jewish Community of Armenia"	Jews
8	"Iveria" benevolent community	Georgians
9	Ukrainian Federation "Ukraina"	Ukrainians
10	National Union of Yezidis	Yezidi
11	"Kurdistan" committee	Kurds
12	"Birlik" Association of Armenia	Qazaqstani

== See also ==
- Demographics of Armenia
