= St. George Church, Sverdlov =

Cultural heritage monument of Armenia

St. George Church Սուրբ Գևորգ եկեղեցի
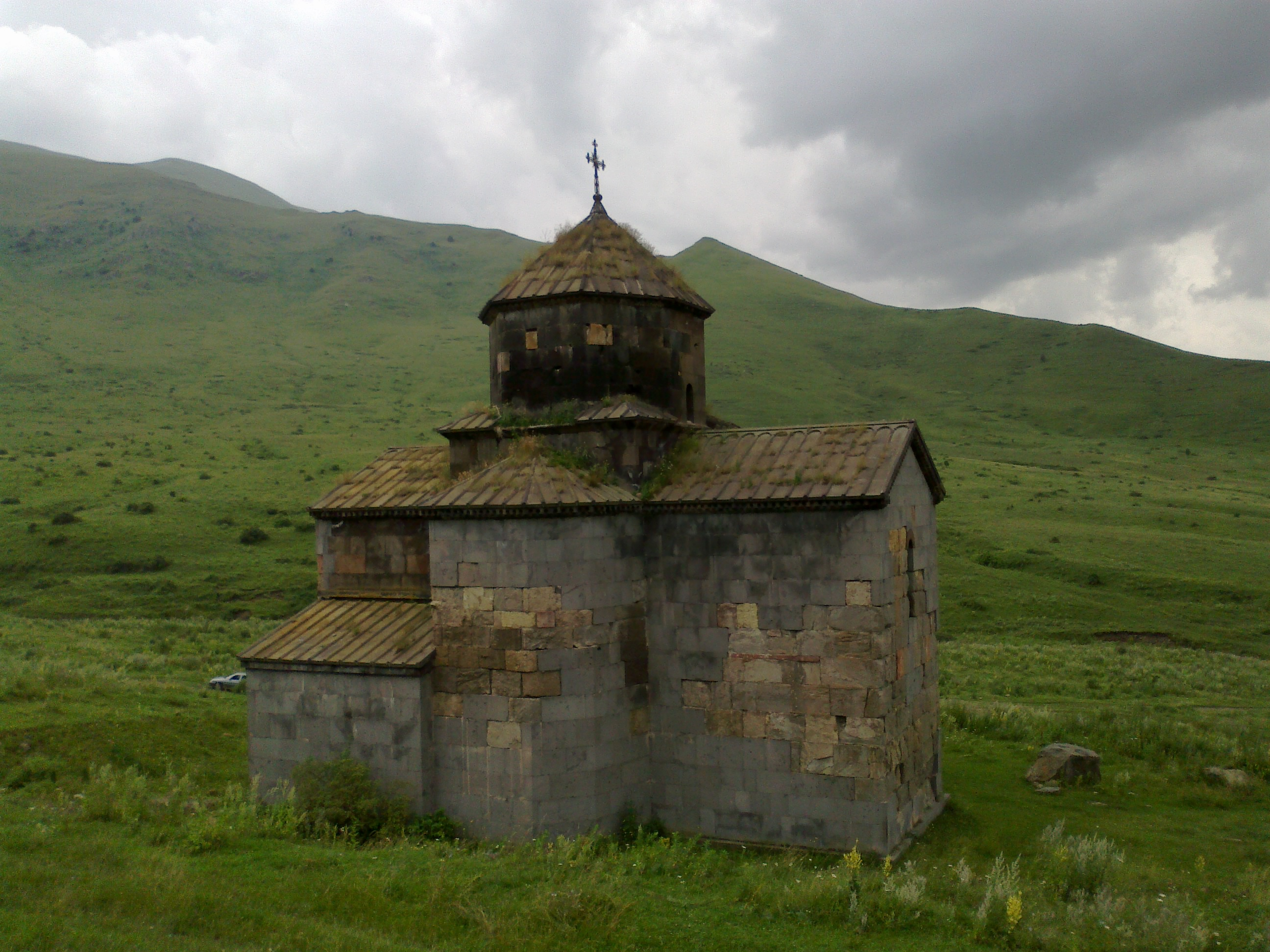

- Location within Armenia

Religion
- Affiliation: Armenian Apostolic Church

Location
- Location: Sverdlov, Lori Province, Armenia
- Coordinates: 41.10141°N 44.434376°E

Architecture
- Style: Armenian

St. George is a 6th-century Armenian church located at the outskirts of Sverdlov village, Armenia.

The church has underrun reconstruction in 19th century and by 2010. The recent reconsecration took place on 19 June 2010 under leadership of Bishop Sebouh Chouldjian, primate of the Diocese of Gougark.

== Gallery ==
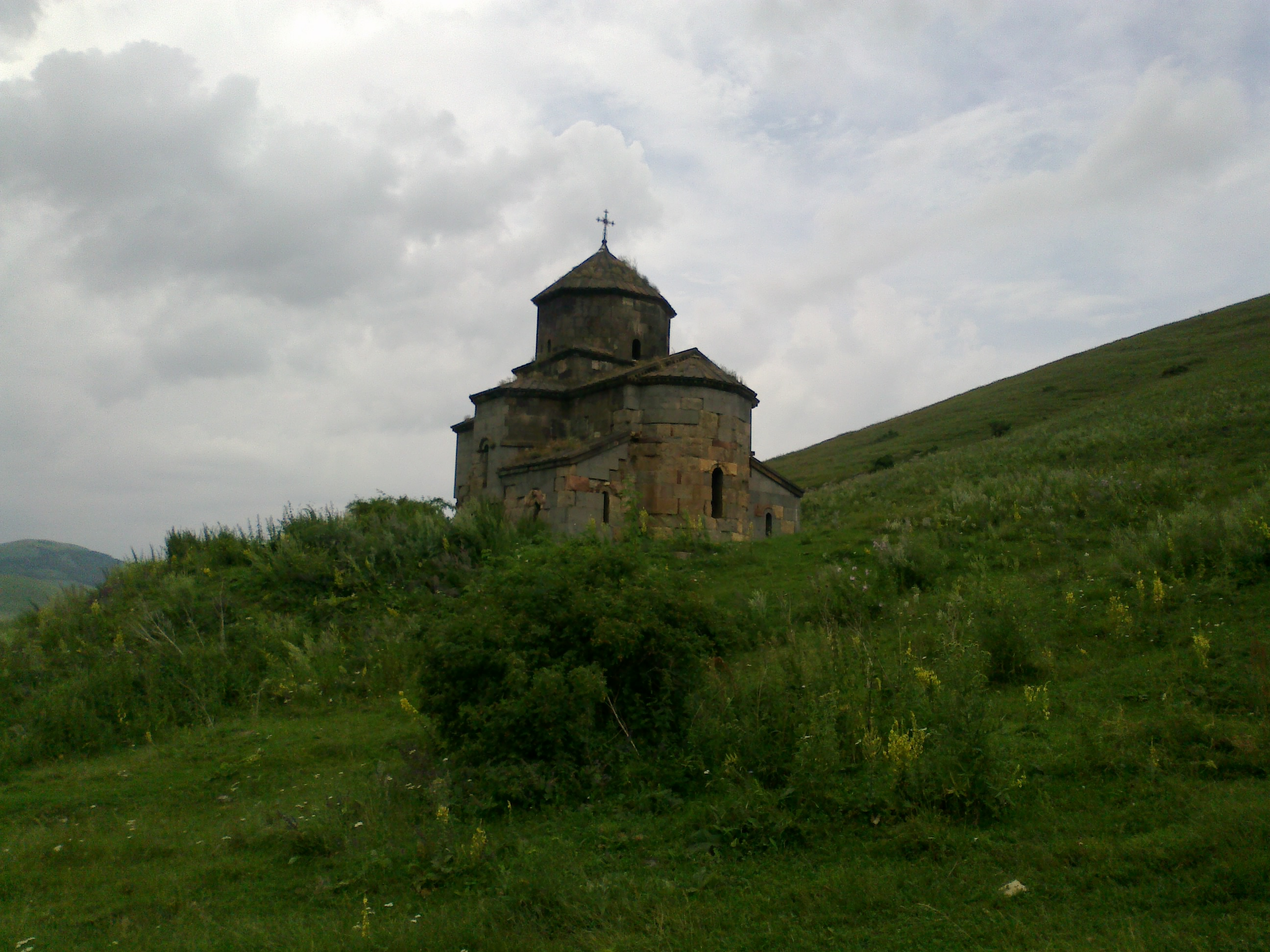

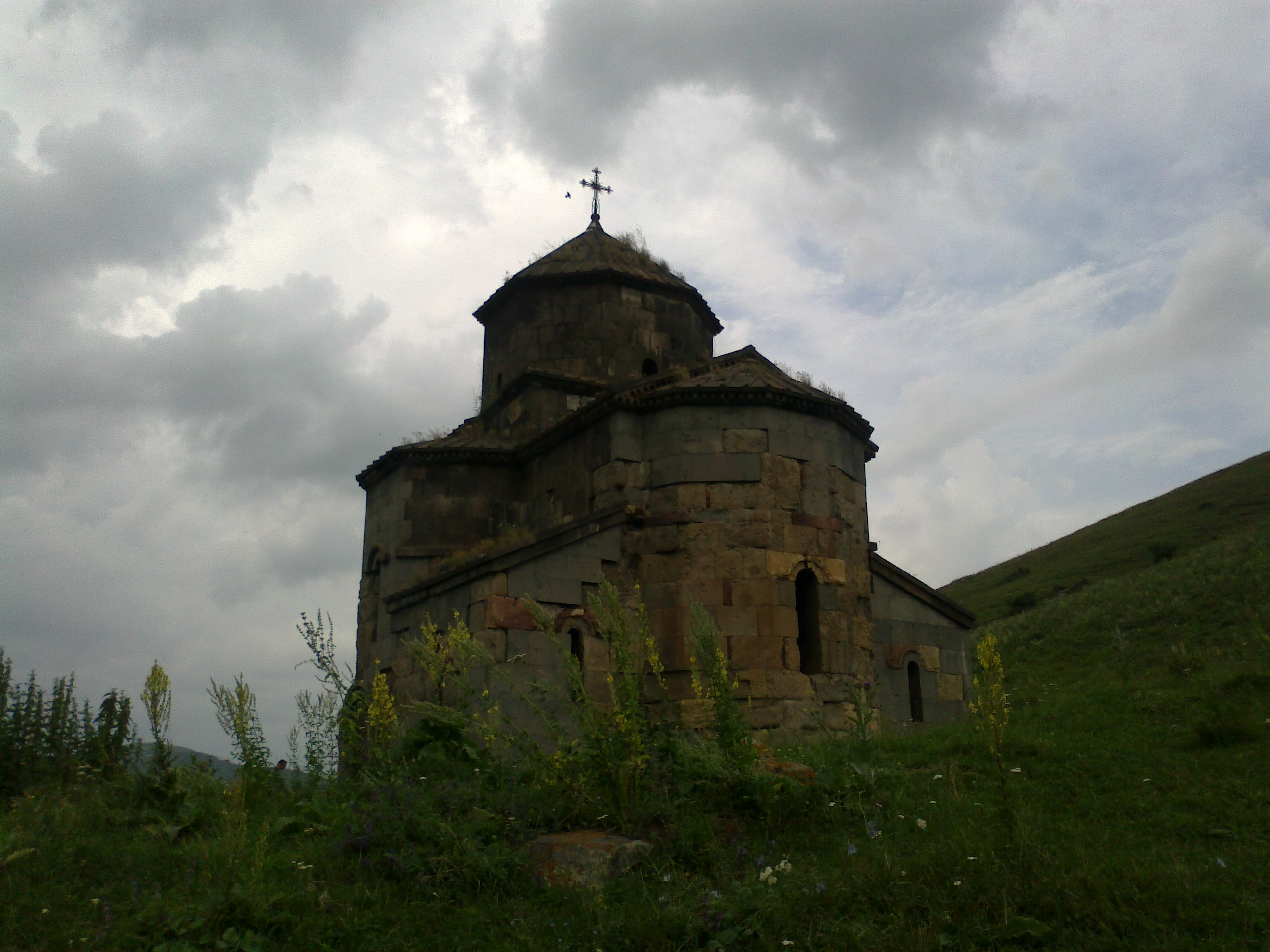

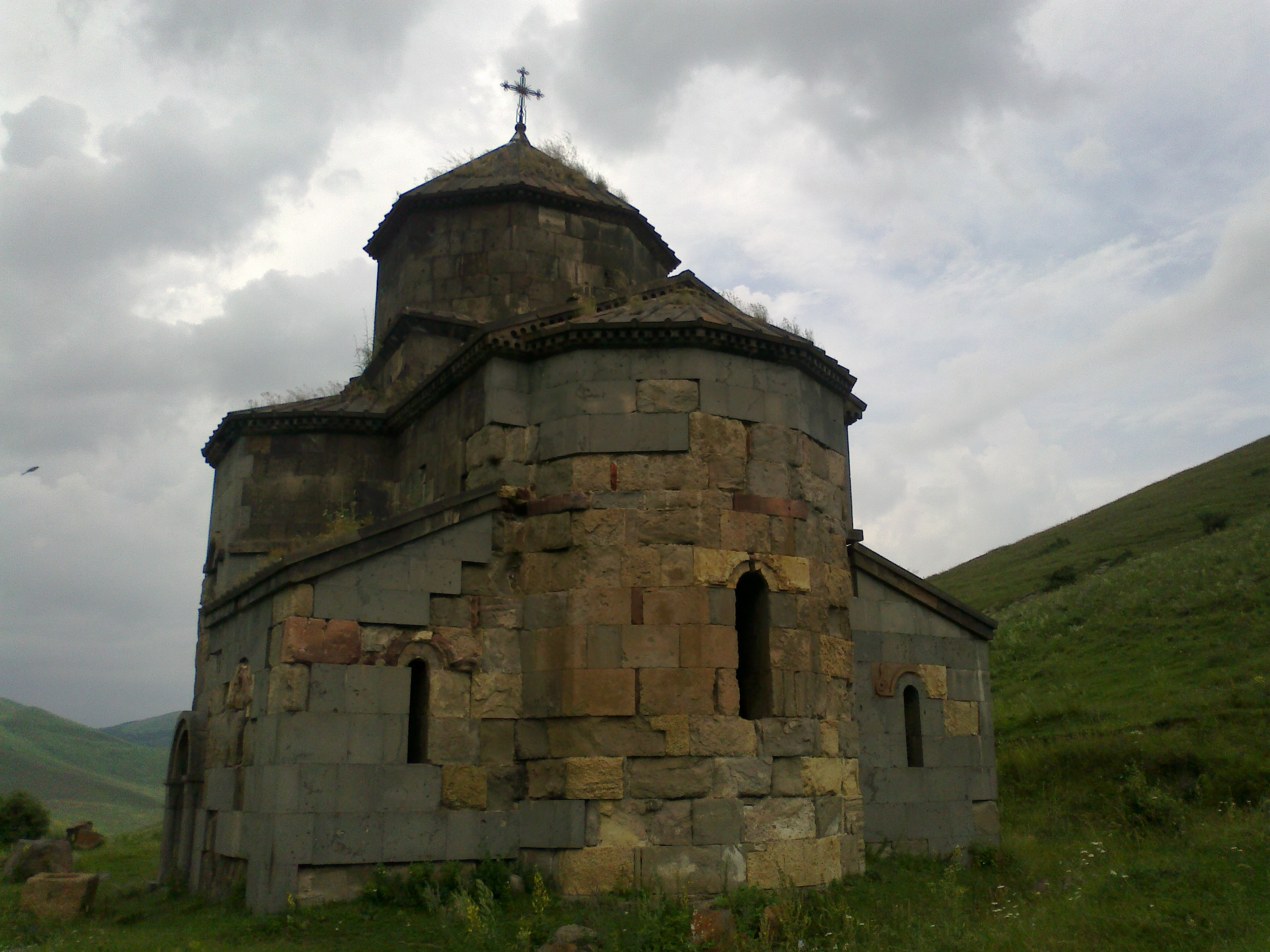

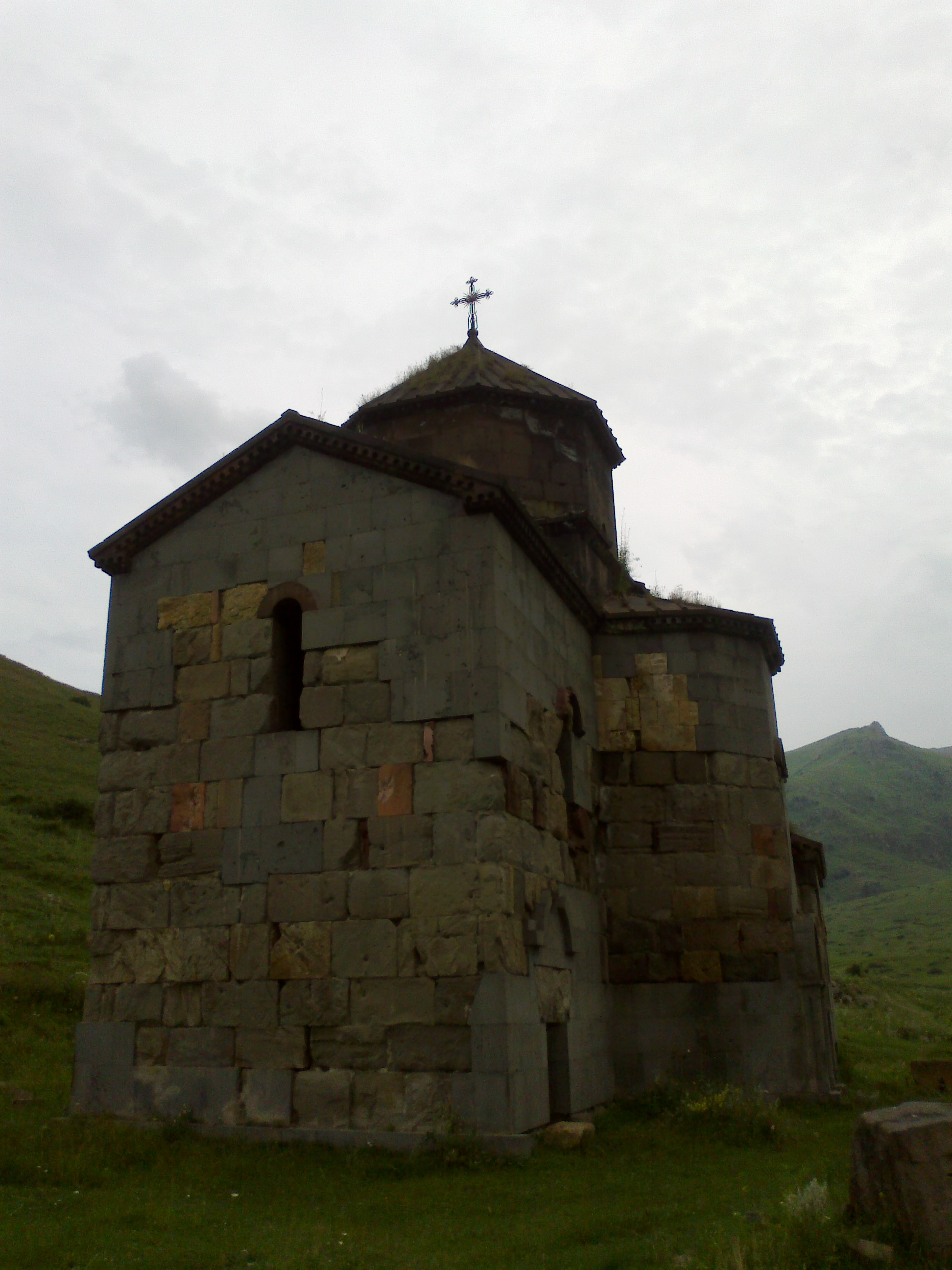
