= Sverdlov, Armenia =

Sverdlov Սվերդլով
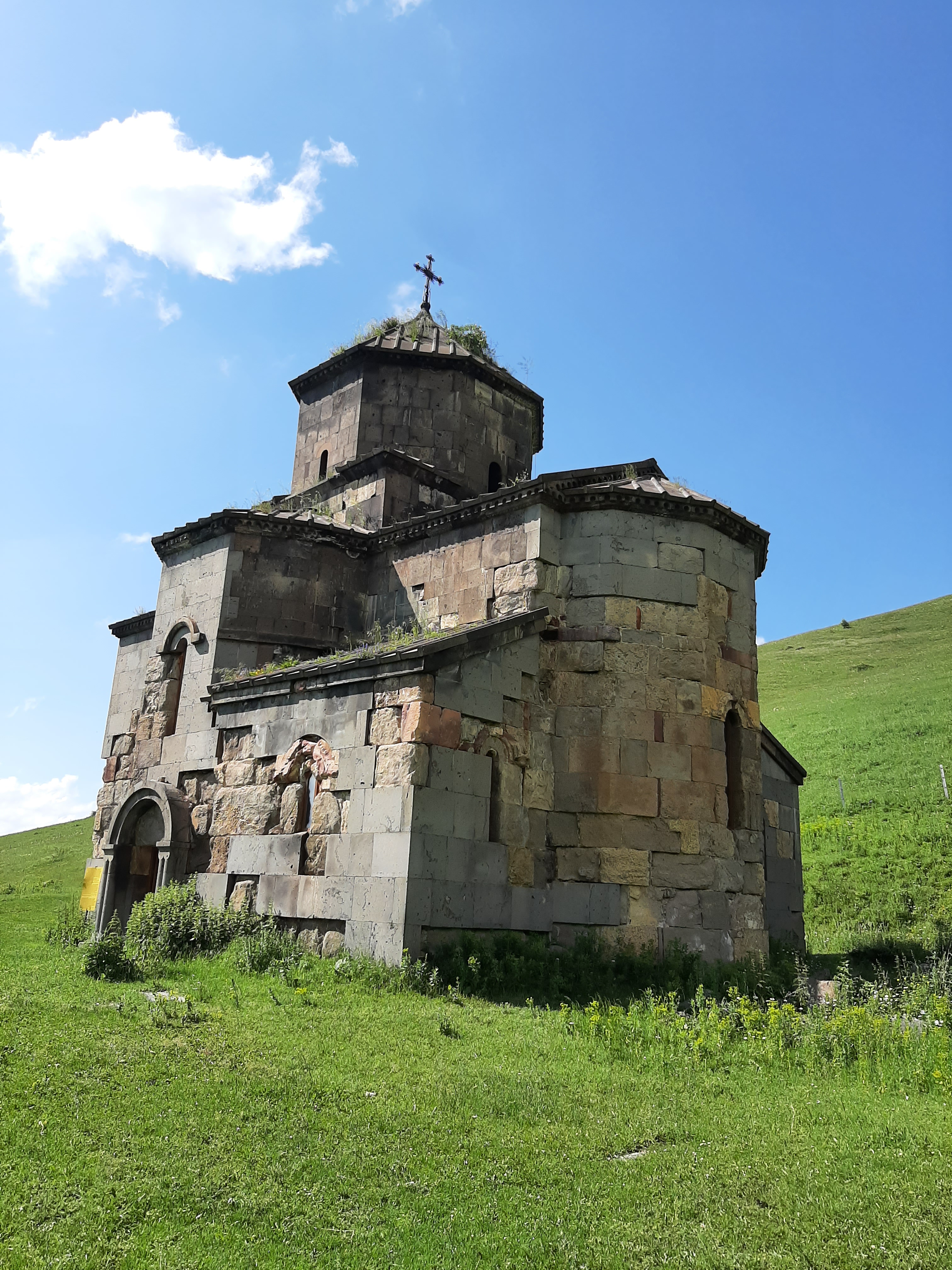
- The 6th century St George's Church in the village

- Location within Armenia
- Coordinates: 41°05′50″N 44°24′03″E
- Country: Armenia
- Province: Lori

Area
  - Total: 2,873 km^{2} (1,109 sq mi)
- Elevation: 1,500 m (4,900 ft)

Population (2011)
  - Total: 1,033
- Time zone: UTC+4 (AMT)

Sverdlov (Armenian: Սվերդլով) is a village in the Lori Province of Armenia.

== Toponymy ==
The village was previously known as Aydarbek. The name Sverdlov originates from the Soviet revolutionary and politician Yakov Sverdlov.

== Geography ==
The village is situated on the Urut River, 12 km (7.5 mi) northeast of Alaverdi and 48 km (30 mi) from Vanadzor. Sverdlov has a mountain climate, with severely cold winters, cool summers and frequent rainfall and hail. Meadows and pastures are located at around 1,900–2,400 meters (6,200–7,900 ft) above the sea level. Medium steep slopes with alpine or subalpine climate are favorable conditions for livestock pasture.

== History ==
The area of the village was a center of tuff and basalt mining from the 5th to the 7th century. The modern village dates back to the 18th century.

== Historical heritage sites ==
The 13th century monastery of Manstev, is located 6 km (3.7 mi) northeast from the village, in the village of Teghut. The 6th century St George's Church is located in the village, which was demolished and rebuilt in the 19th century, then renovated and re-consecrated in 2010. The chapel of the church is dated to the 13th century. There are also preserved cemetery ruins.

== Economy and culture ==
Residents are mainly engaged in livestock breeding and growing grains, potatoes, melons and pumpkins.
