= Amrakits =

Village in Lori, Armenia

Amrakits Ամրակից
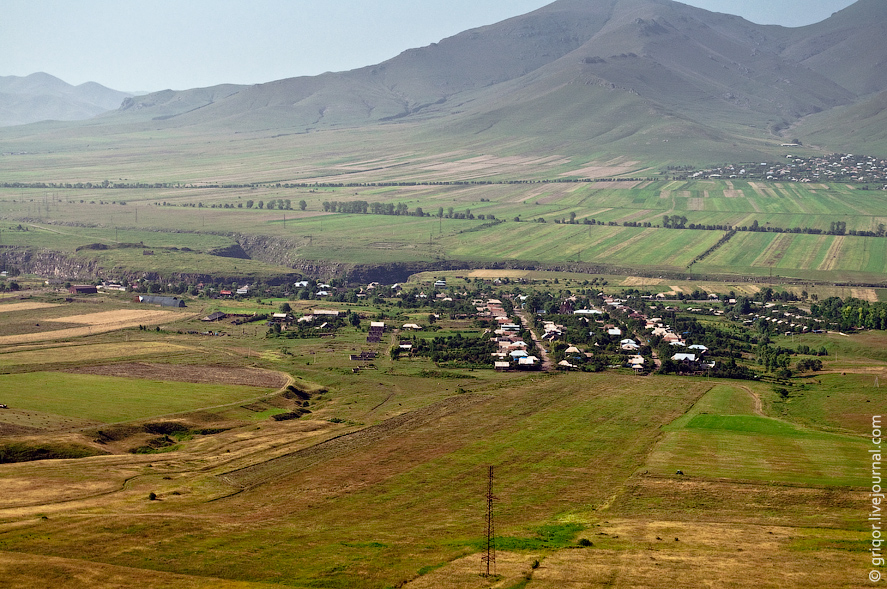

- Location within Armenia
- Coordinates: 40°59′50″N 44°25′38″E
- Country: Armenia
- Province: Lori

Area
  - Total: 12.2 km^{2} (4.7 sq mi)
- Elevation: 1,380 m (4,530 ft)

Population (2011)
  - Total: 522
- Time zone: UTC+4 (AMT)

Amrakits (Armenian: Ամրակից) is a village in the Lori Province of Armenia.

== Toponymy ==
The village was formerly known as Nikolayevka and later as Kirov.

== Gallery ==
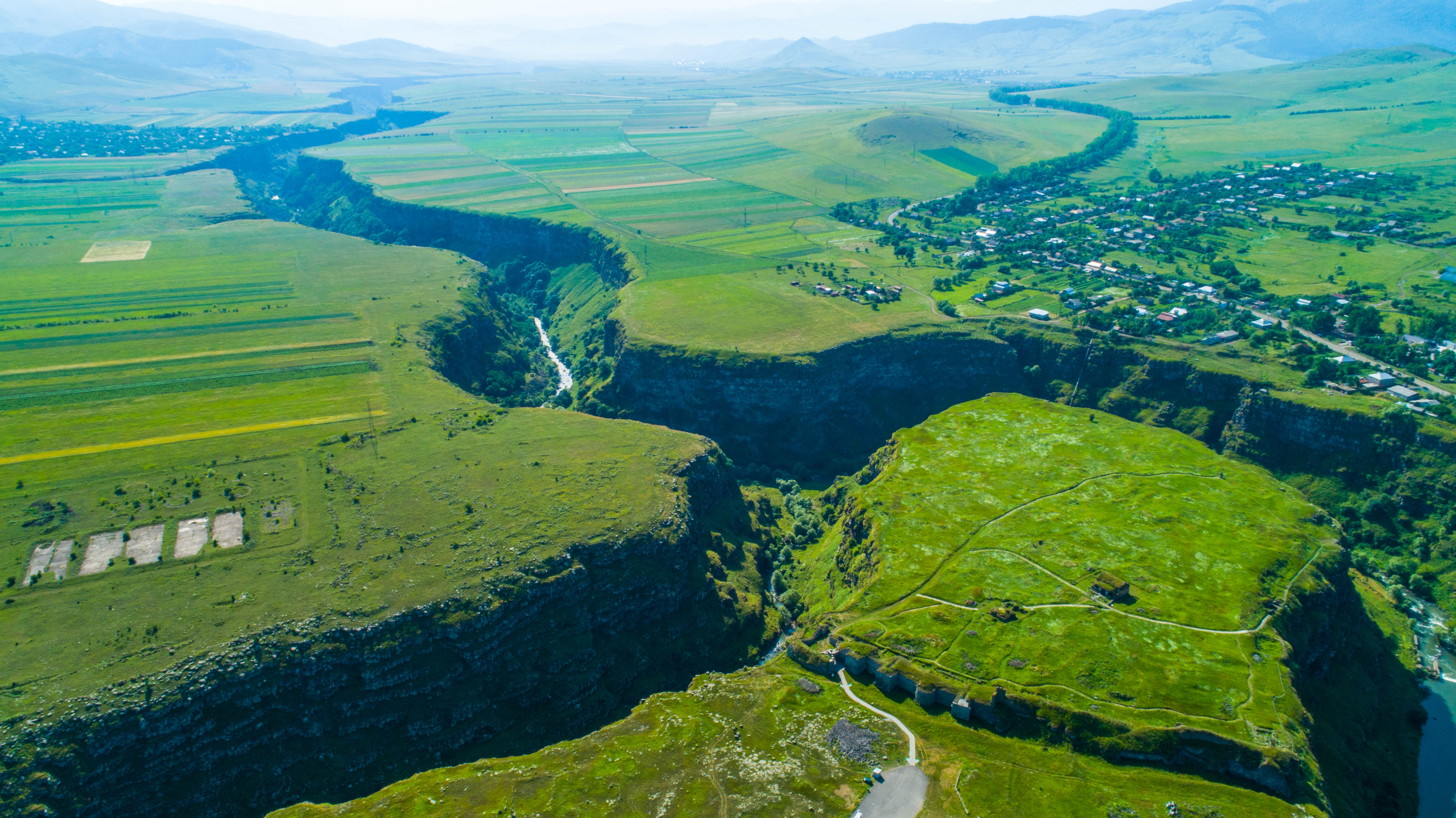

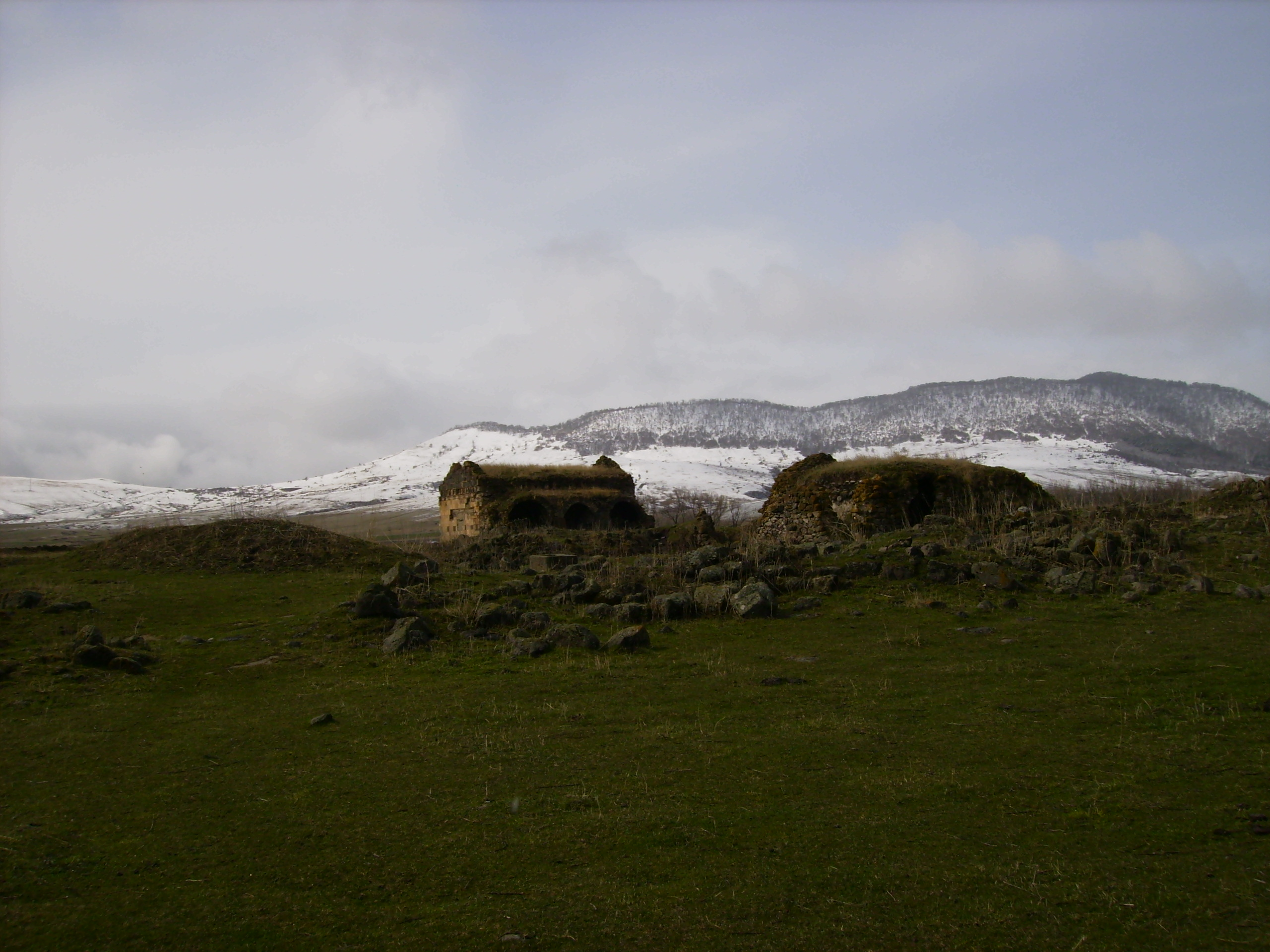

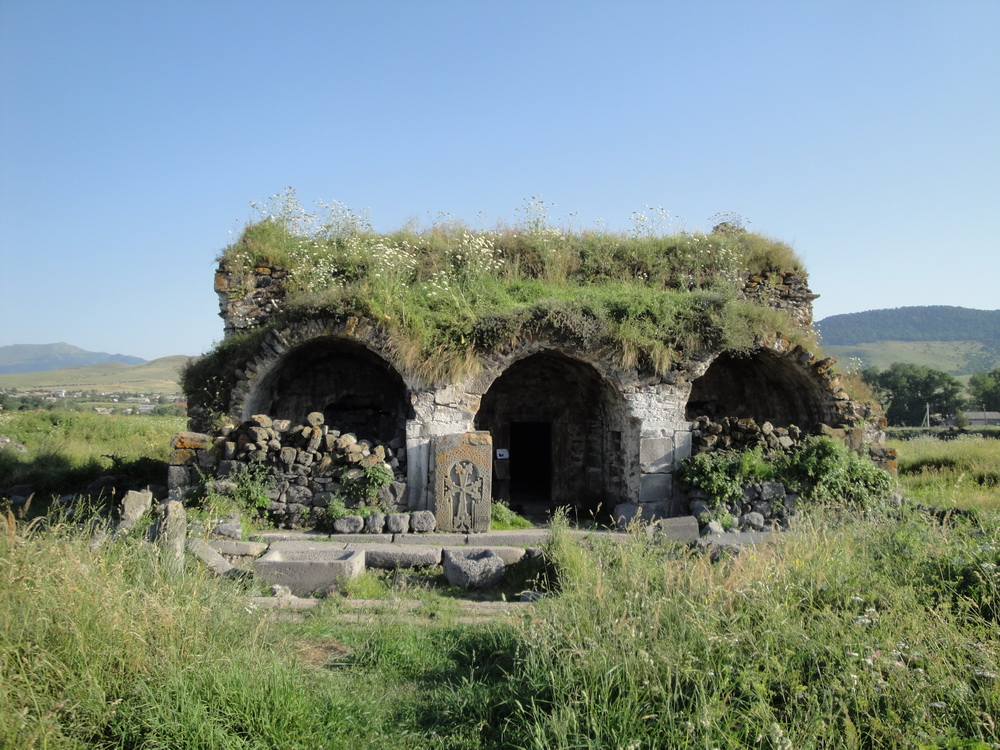

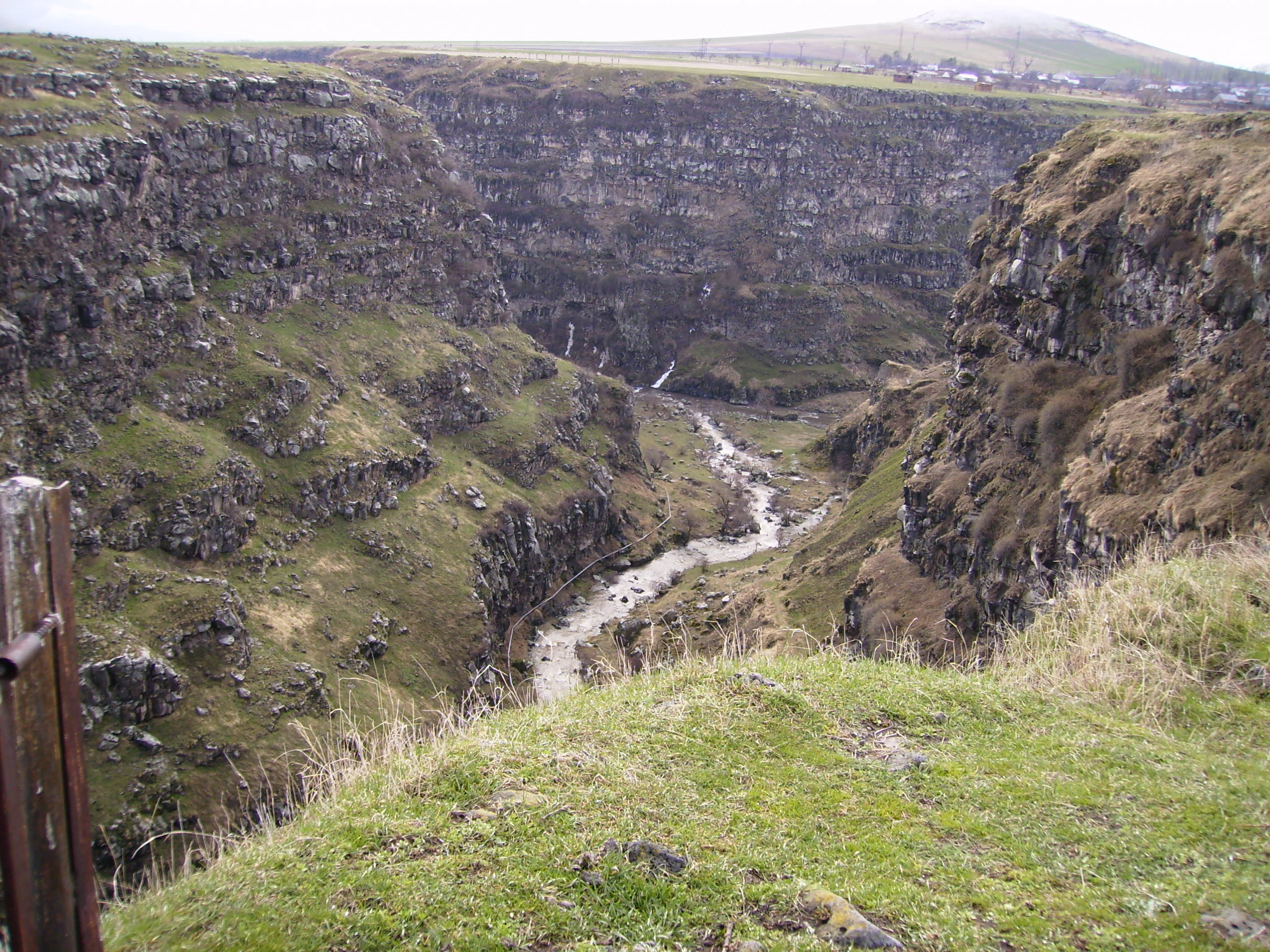

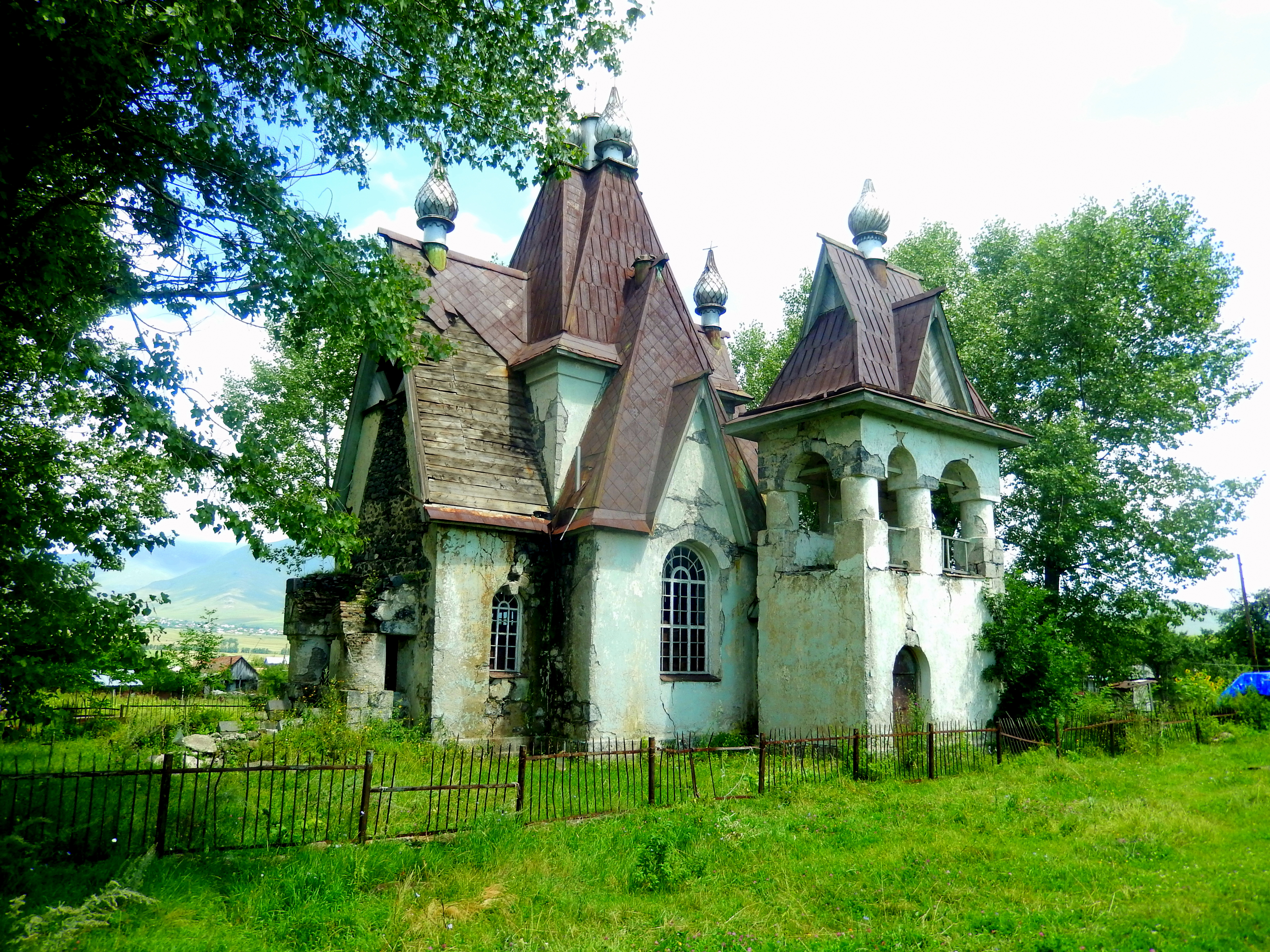
