= Pushkino, Armenia =

Pushkino Պուշկինո
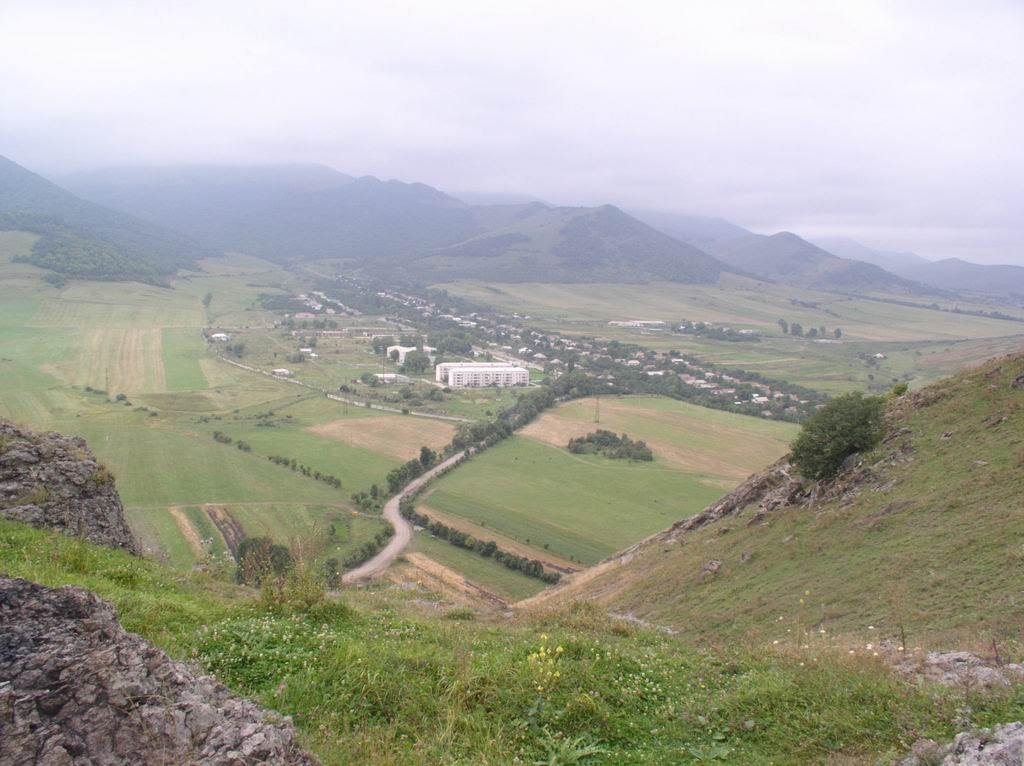

- Location within Armenia
- Coordinates: 40°57′30″N 44°24′32″E
- Country: Armenia
- Province: Lori
- Elevation: 1,450 m (4,760 ft)

Population (2011)
  - Total: 339
- Time zone: UTC+4 (AMT)

Pushkino (Armenian: Պուշկինո) is a village in the Lori Province of Armenia.

== Toponymy ==
The village was previously known as Gerger Russkiy.

== Gallery ==
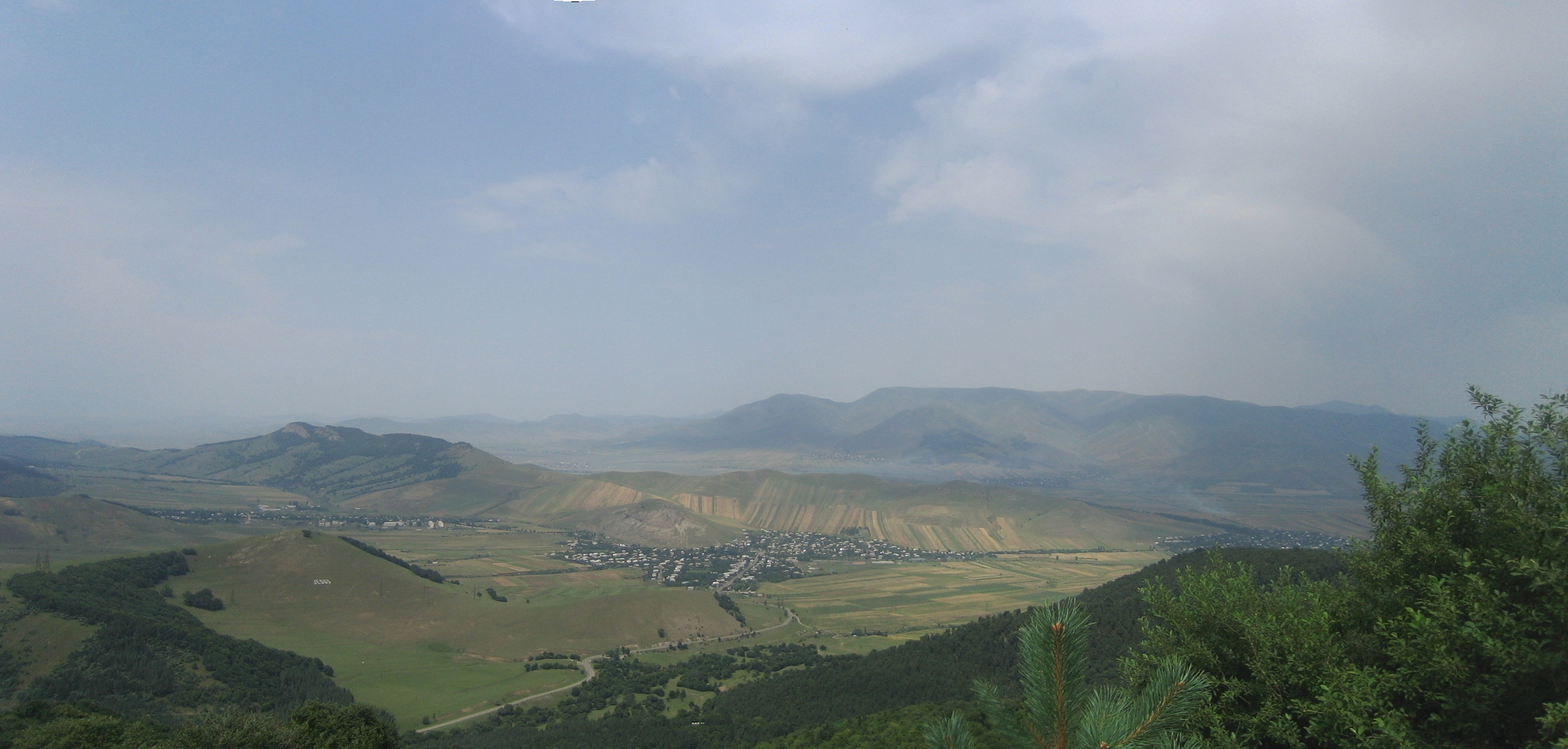
The northern part of the Lori Province as seen from Pushkin Pass. Pushkino is visible in the foreground to the left.

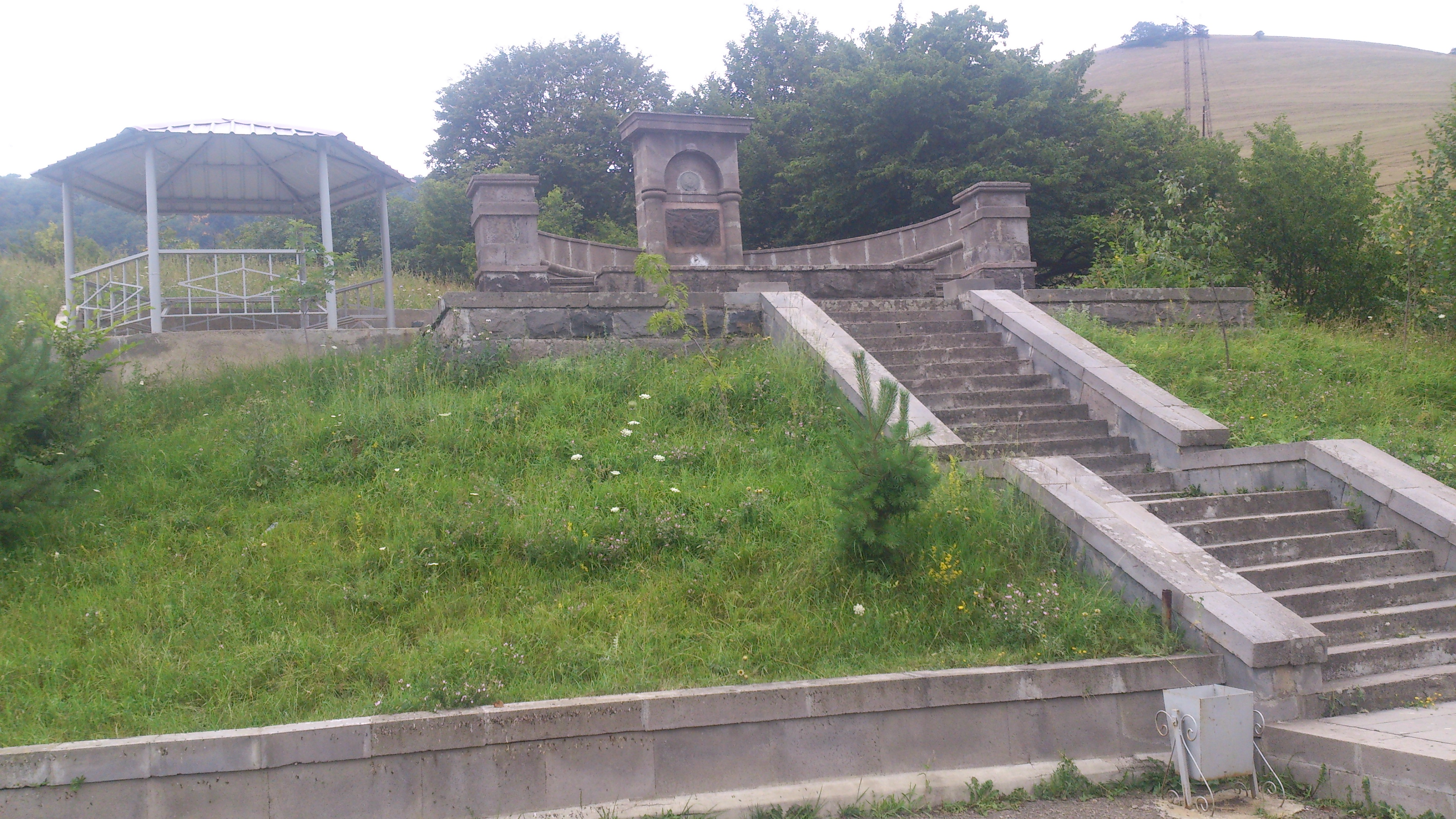

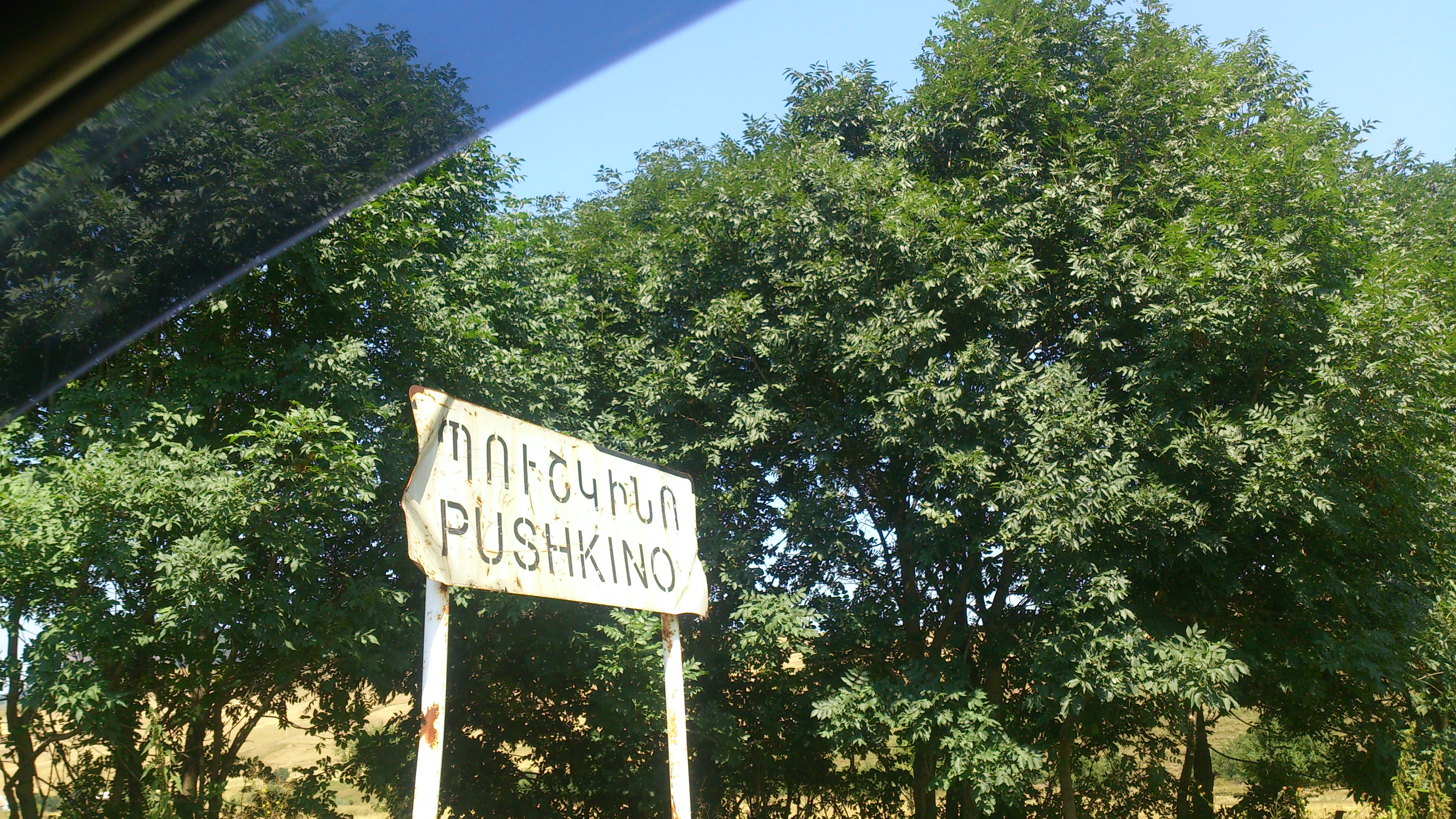
