= Lernantsk =

Lernantsk Լեռնանցք
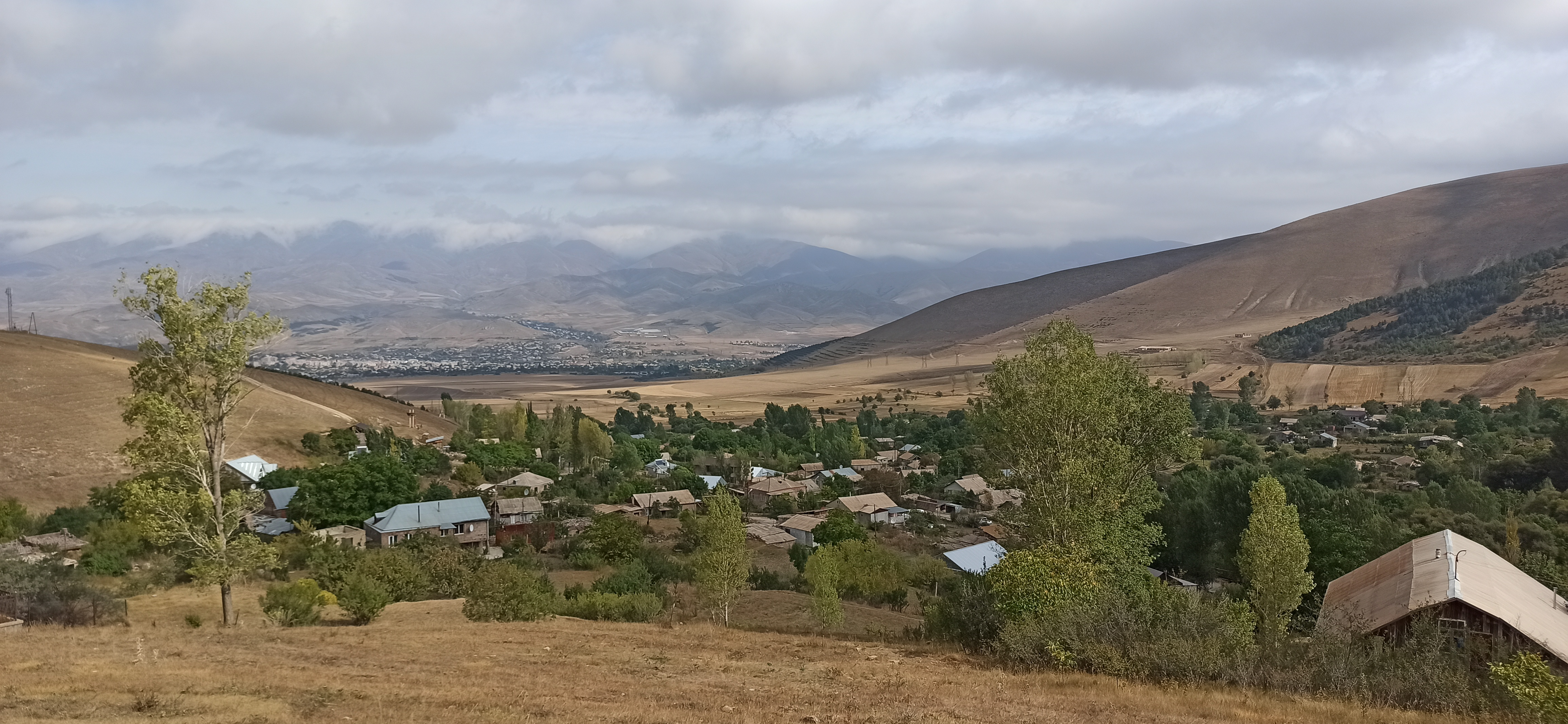

- Location within Armenia
- Coordinates: 40°46′48″N 44°16′12″E
- Country: Armenia
- Marz (Province): Lori Province
- Elevation: 1,650 m (5,410 ft)

Population (2011)
  - Total: 1,221
- Time zone: UTC+4 ( )
  - Summer (DST): UTC+5

Lernantsk (Armenian: Լեռնանցք, also romanized as Lernantsq) is a village in the Lori Province of Armenia.
