= Census in Armenia =

Population census conducted in Armenia

Census in Armenia is a population census conducted in Armenia about every 10 years with the purpose of capturing exact data on demographics in the country.

== Demographic trends ==
While Armenians formed a consistent majority, Azerbaijanis were historically the second largest population in the republic under Soviet rule (forming about 2.5% in 1989). However, due to hostilities with neighboring Azerbaijan over the disputed region of Nagorno-Karabakh virtually all Azeris emigrated from Armenia. Conversely, Armenia received a large influx of Armenian refugees from Azerbaijan, thus giving Armenia a more homogeneous character. This forceful population exchange also affected the Christian Udi people of Azerbaijan, many of whom were perceived as Armenians due to close cultural ties between both peoples. The number of Udis residing in Armenia has increased from 19 in 1989 to about 200 by 2006.

Additionally, since independence, several other ethnic groups have significantly shrunk in size, especially Russians (who decreased from 51,555 persons in 1989 to 14,660 in 2001), Ukrainians (8,341 in 1989 to 1,633 in 2001), Greeks (4,650 in 1989 to 1,176 in 2001), and Belarusians (1,061 in 1989 to 160 in 2001). The numbers of Yazidis, Kurds, and Assyrians have remained consistent for the most part (though approximately 2,000 Assyrians have left Armenia between 1989 and 2001). Although Georgians were historically counted among the largest ethnic groups in modern Armenia, their numbers have dropped substantially since the 1989 Soviet census when they numbered 1,364 persons.

== Russian Empire censuses ==
Year	Total	Armenians	Tatars	Others
1831	161,747	110,671 (68.4%)	50,274 (31.1%)	802 (0.5%)
1873	496,140 ▲	329,266 (66.4%) ▼	132,125 (26.6%) ▼	34,749 (7.0%) ▲
1886	635,833 ▲	430,865 (67.8%) ▲	160,963 (25.3%) ▼	44,005 (6.9%) ▼
1897	797,853 ▲	510,855 (64.0%) ▼	240,323 (30.1%) ▲	46,675 (5.9%) ▼

== Soviet Armenia censuses ==
Year	Total	Urban	Rural	Armenians	Azerbaijanis	Russians	Yazidis/Kurds	Ukrainians	Assyrians	Greeks	Georgians	Belarusians	Others
1922	782,052	91,298 (11.7%)	690,754 (88.3%)	671,279 (85.8%)	77,767 (9.9%)								33,006 (4.2%)
1926	878,929 ▲	165,908 (18.8%) ▲	713,021 (81.1%) ▼	743,571 (84.5%) ▼	83,181 (9.4%) ▼	19,548 (2.2%)	15,262^{1} (1.7%)	2,826 (0.3%)	2,215 (0.3%)	2,980 (0.3%)	274 (0.03%)	360 (0.04%)	10,927 (1.2%) ▼
1939	1,282,338 ▲	N/A	N/A	1,061,997 (82.8%) ▼	130,896 (10.2%) ▲	51,464 (4%) ▲	20,481 (1.5%) ▼	5,496 (0.4%) ▲	3,280 (0.2%) ▼	4,181 (0.3%)	652 (0.05%) ▲	458 (0.03%) ▼	3,433 (0.2%) ▼
1959	1,763,048 ▲	N/A	N/A	1,551,610 (88%) ▲	107,748 (6.1%) ▼	56,477 (3.2%) ▼	25,627 (1.4%) ▼	5,593 (0.3%) ▼	4,326 (0.2%)	4,976 (0.2%) ▼	816 (0.04%) ▼	805 (0.04%) ▲	9,396 (0.5%) ▲
1970	2,491,873 ▲	1,481,532 (59.4%) ▲	1,010,341 (40.5%) ▼	2,208,327 (88.6%) ▲	148,189 (5.9%) ▼	66,108 (2.6%) ▼	37,486 (1.5%) ▲	8,390 (0.3%)	5,544 (0.2%)	5,690 (0.2%)	1,439 (0.05%) ▲	1,179 (0.04%)	9,521 (0.3%) ▼
1979	3,037,259 ▲	1,992,539 (65.7%) ▲	1,038,208 (34.3%) ▼	2,724,975 (89.7%) ▲	160,841 (5.2%) ▼	70,336 (2.3%) ▼	50,822 (1.6%) ▲	8,900 (0.2%) ▼	6,183 (0.2%)	5,653 (0.1%) ▼	1,314 (0.04%) ▼	1,183 (0.03%) ▼	7,052 (0.2%) ▼
1989	3,304,776 ▲	2,229,540 (67.8%) ▲	1,058,137 (32.2%) ▼	3,083,616 (93.3%) ▲	84,860 (2.5%) ▼	51,555 (1.5%) ▼	56,127 (1.6%)	8,341 (0.2%)	5,963 (0.1%) ▼	4,650 (0.1%)	1,364 (0.04%)	1,061 (0.03%)	7,239 (0.2%)

^{1} Includes numbers of both Yazidi and Kurdish populations which were counted separately in the 1926 census but were combined in subsequent censuses.

== Republic of Armenia censuses ==
The first census in Armenia after the dissolution of the Soviet Union was conducted by the Government of Armenia's National Statistical Service during the period of October 10–19, 2001. The census night was October 10. The National Assembly adopted the law "On Census" in 1999, but the government lacked the necessary funds to carry out the count immediately. According to Armenian law, a census must take place every 10 years.

Year	Total	Urban	Rural	Armenians	Yazidis	Russians	Assyrians	Ukrainians	Kurds	Greeks	Persians	Georgians	Indians	Others
2001	3,213,011	2,066,153 (64.3%)	1,146,858 (35.7%)	3,145,354 (97.9%)	40,620 (1.2%)	14,660 (0.4%)	3,409 (0.1%)	1,633 (0.05%)	1,519 (0.04%)	1,176 (0.03%)	-	-	-	4,640 (0.1%)
2011	3,018,854 ▼	1,911,287 (63.3%) ▼	1,107,567 (36.7%) ▲	2,961,801 (98.1%) ▲	35,308 (1.1%) ▼	11,911 (0.3%) ▼	2,769 (0.09%) ▼	1,176 (0.03%) ▼	2,162 (0.07%) ▲	900 (0.02%) ▼	476 (0.02%)	617 (0.02%)	-	1,634 (0.06%) ▲
2022	2,932,731 ▼	1,871,913 (63.83%) ▲	1,060,818 (36.17%) ▼	2,875,697 (98.05%) ▼	31,079 (1.05%) ▼	14,076 (0.47%) ▲	2,755 (0.09%) ▲	1,005 (0.03%) ▼	1,663 (0.06%) ▼	364 (0.02%) ▼	434 (0.01%) ▼	222 (0.01%) ▼	593 (0.02%)	4,298 (0.15%) ▲

== See also ==
- Demographics of Armenia
