= Beniamin =

Village in Shirak, Armenia

Beniamin Բենիամին Chalovkhan
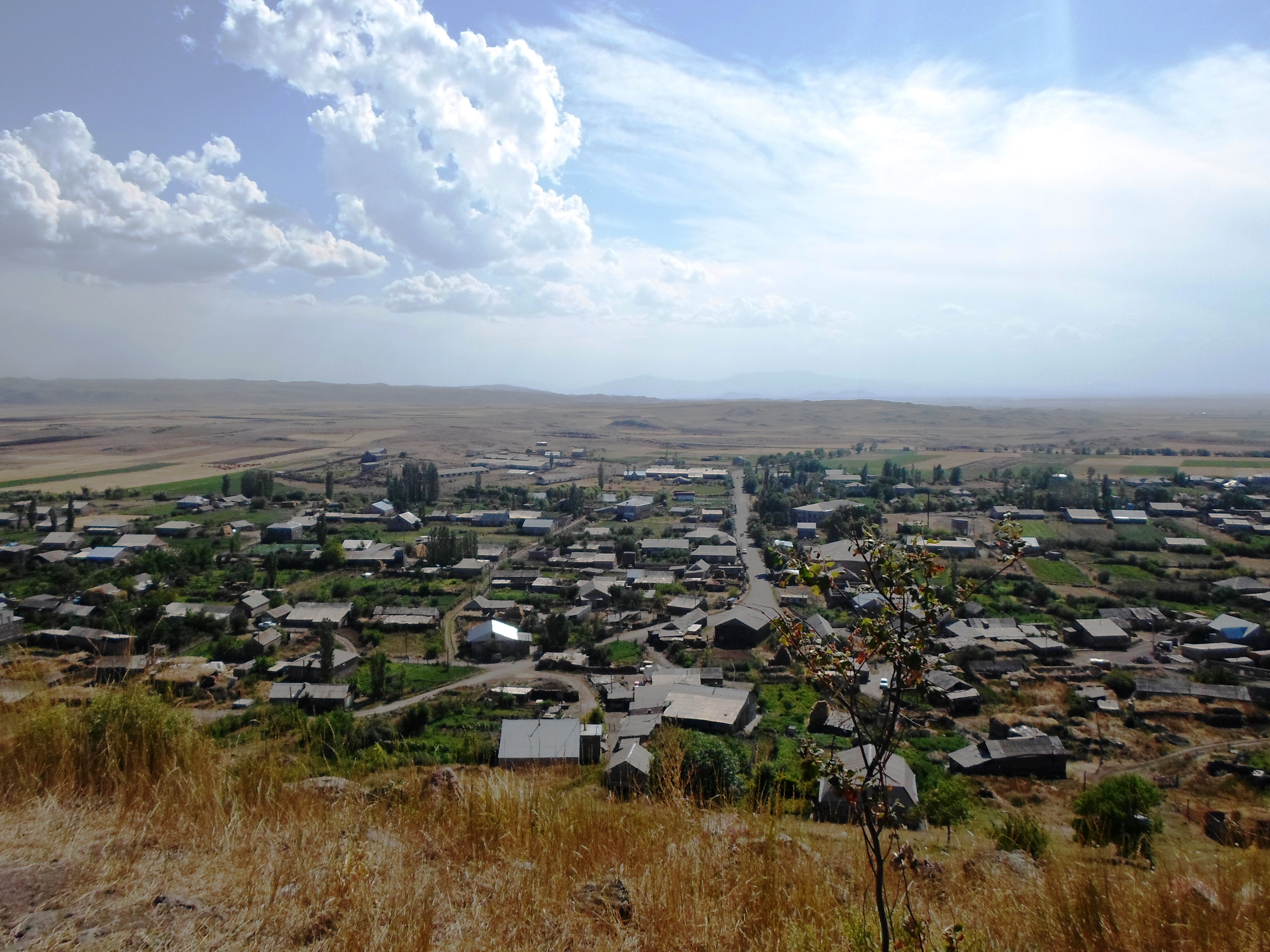

- Location within Armenia Location within Shirak
- Coordinates: 40°41′N 43°51′E
- Country: Armenia
- Province: Shirak
- Municipality: Akhuryan
- Established: 1828
- Elevation: 1,540 m (5,050 ft)

Population (2011)
  - Total: 724
- Time zone: UTC+4
  - Summer (DST): UTC+5

Beniamin (Armenian: Բենիամին) is a village in the Akhuryan Municipality of the Shirak Province of Armenia. The town was renamed in 1945 in honor of Beniamin Galstian, a World War II general and native of the town. According to Ghevont Alishan, the old name of the village is "Chlofkhan or Chalovkhan", and was founded in 1828-1830 in the territory of the historical city of Draskhanakert. The Statistical Committee of Armenia reported its population was 745 in 2010, up from 702 at the 2001 census.

== Demographics ==
Historical population
Year	Pop.	±% p.a.
1897	561	—
1926	442	−0.82%
1939	604	+2.43%
1959	546	−0.50%
1970	531	−0.25%
1979	500	−0.67%
1989	751	+4.15%
2001	702	−0.56%
2011	724	+0.31%

== Historical and cultural structures ==
"Tukh Manuk" chapel and Zham church are located in Beniamin.

== Education ==
There is a school in the village, where, in addition to the school curriculum, children are involved in extracurricular programs: art and craft groups, debate club, healthy lifestyle seminars.

With the efforts of the Children of Armenia Fund, trainings are being carried out for local medical workers.

== Gallery ==
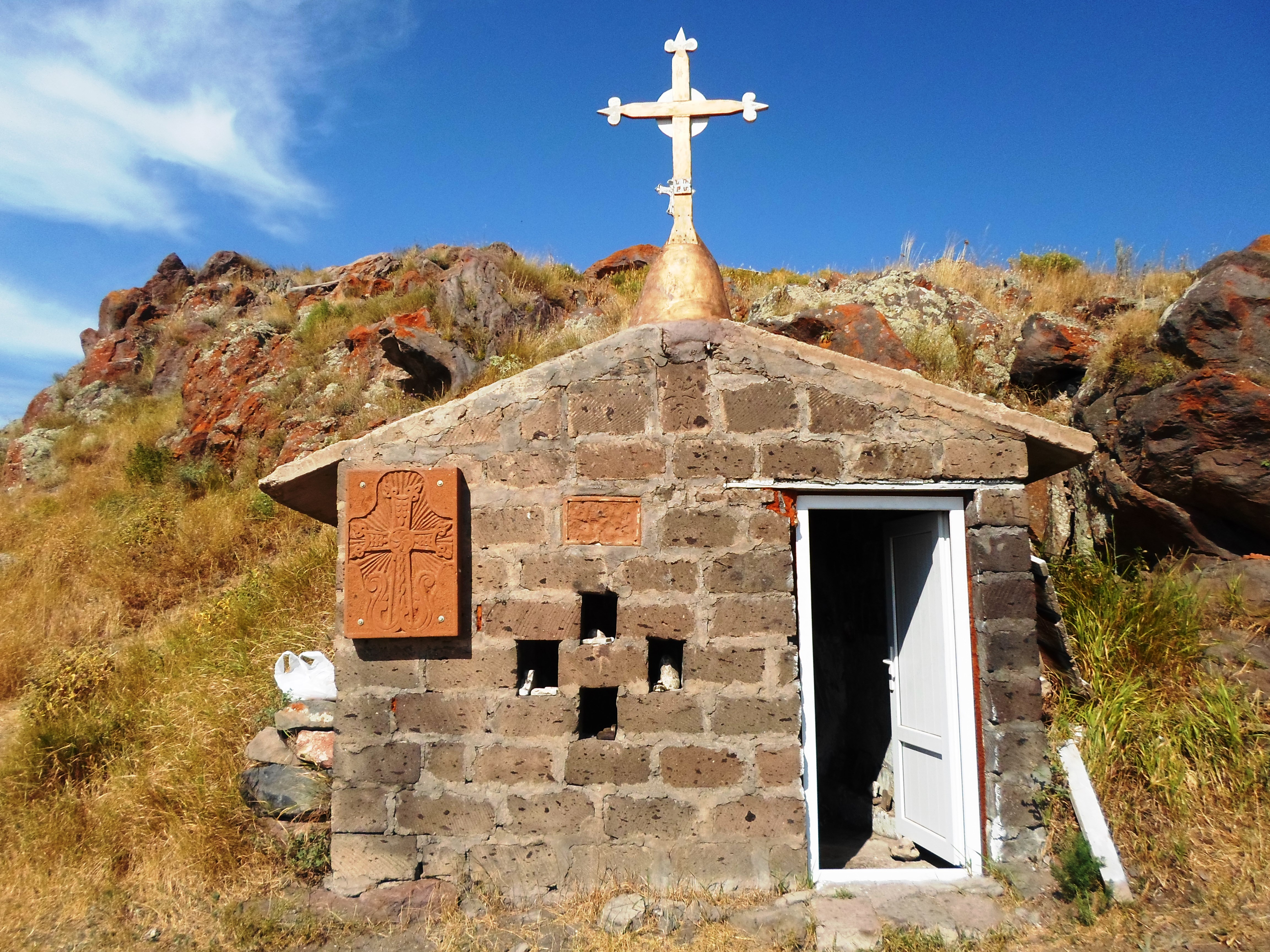
"Tukh Manuk" chapel

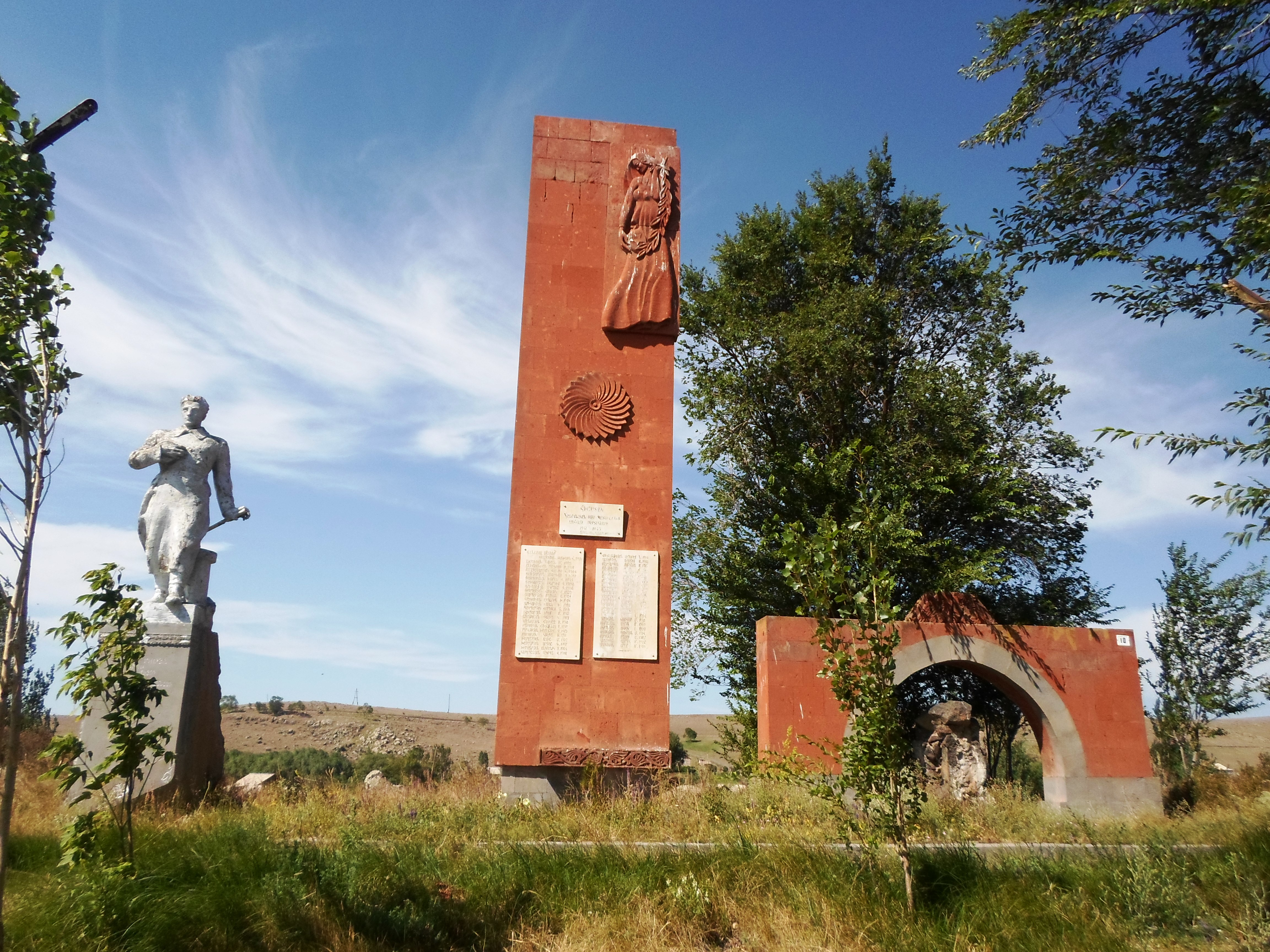
Monument in the honor of Armenians who fought in the Great Patriotic War

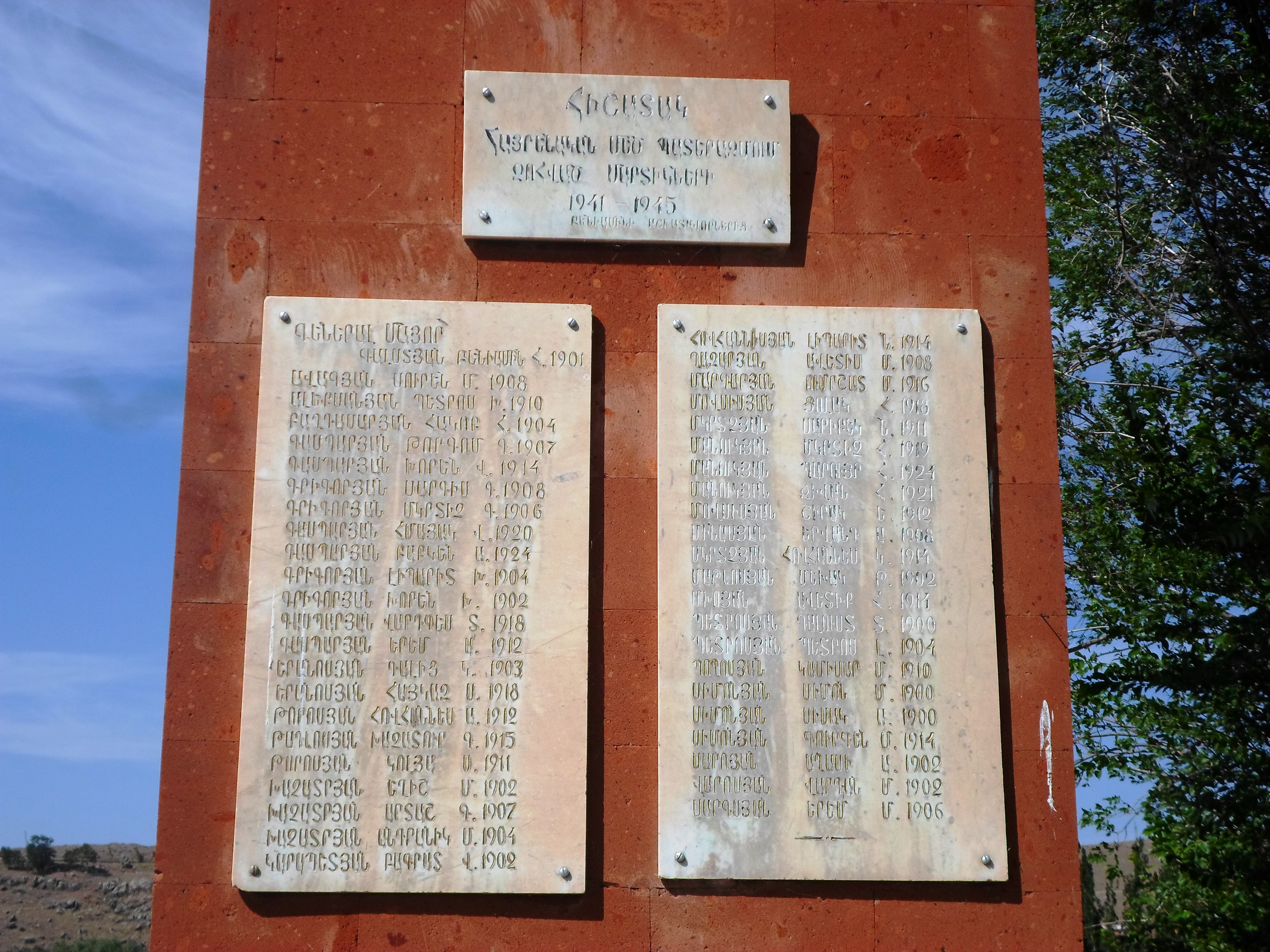
Monument in the honor of Armenians who fought in the Great Patriotic War

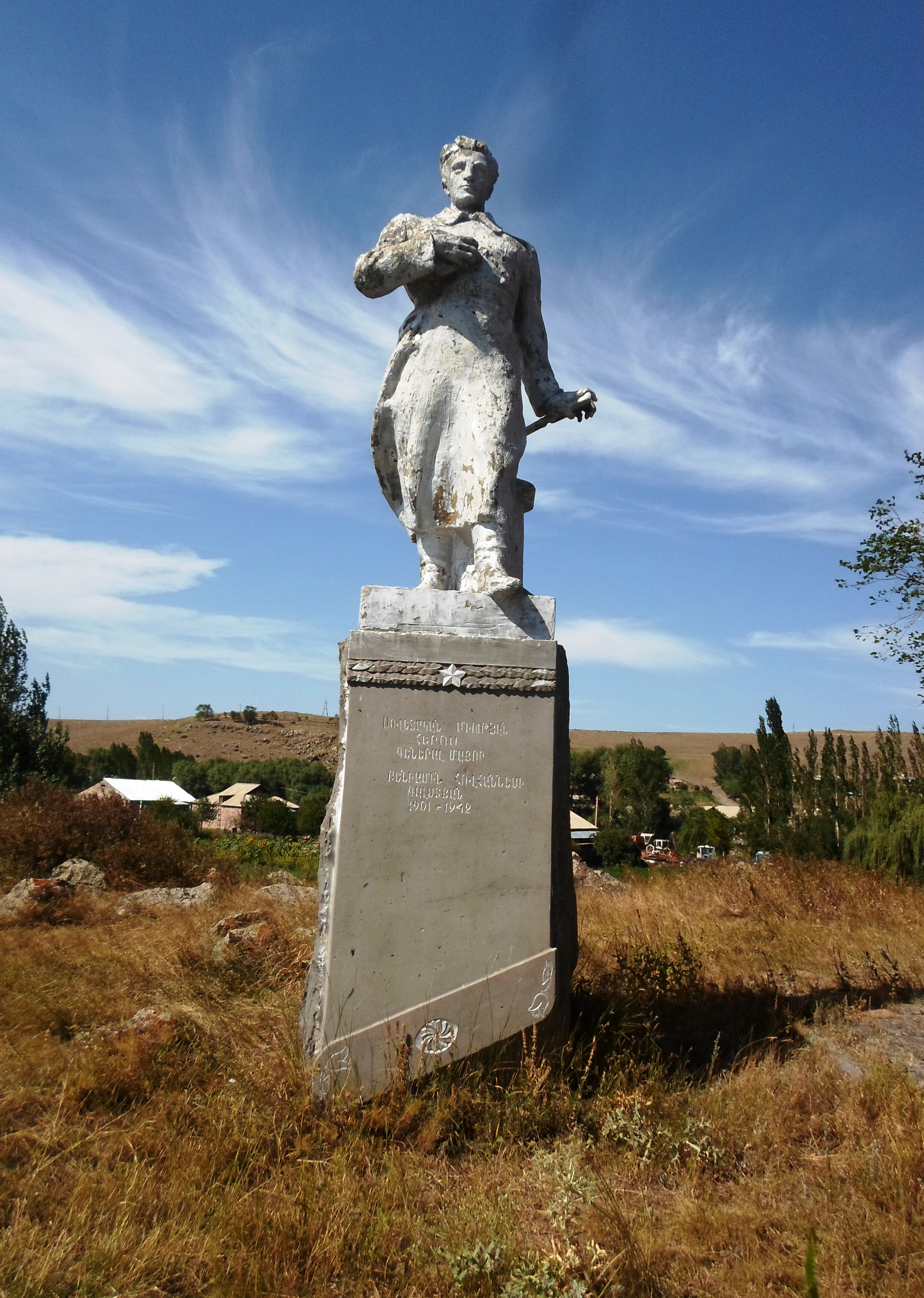
Monument to General Major Benjamin Hovhannes Galstyan, Hero of the Soviet Union

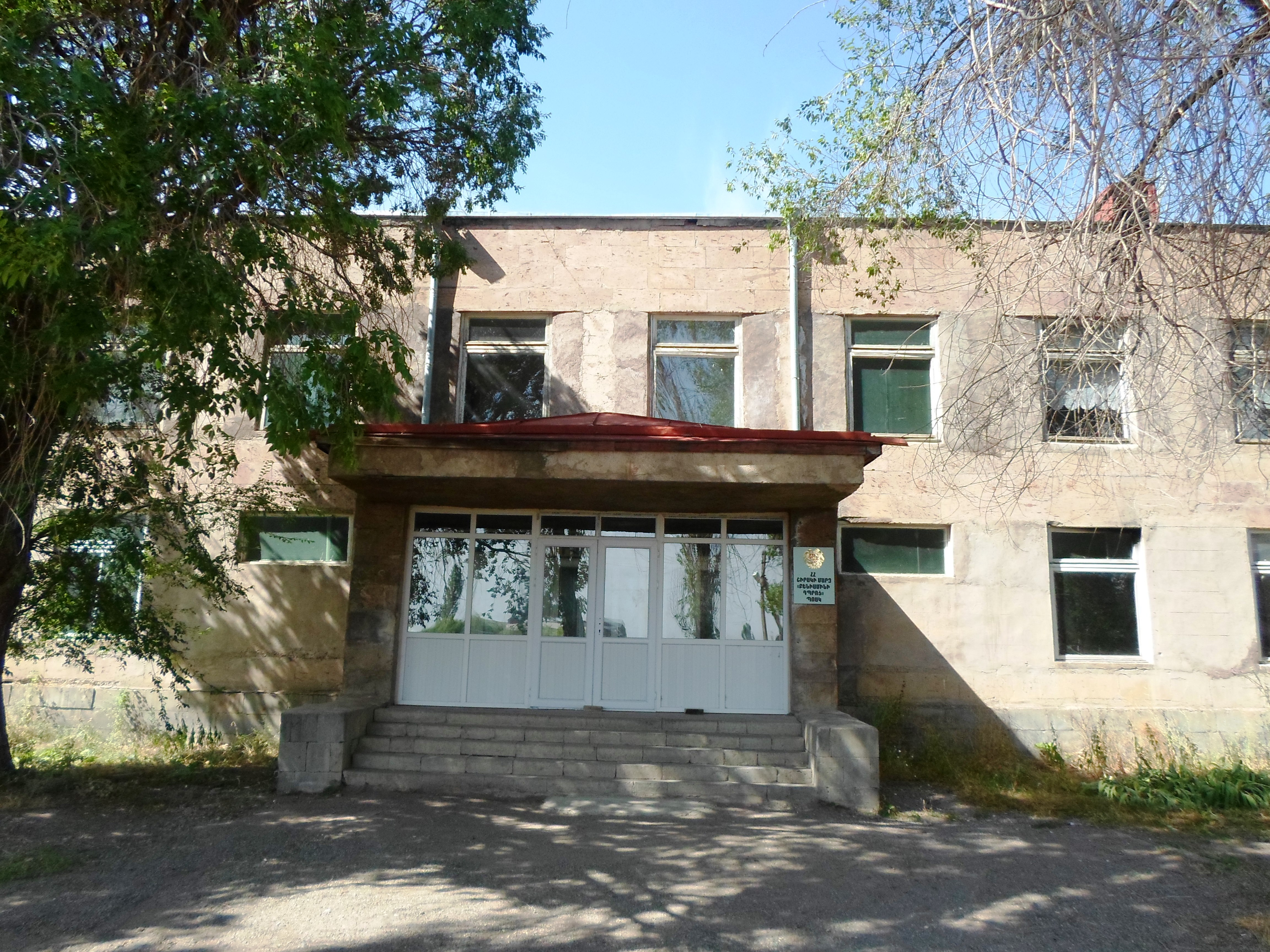
Beniamin school

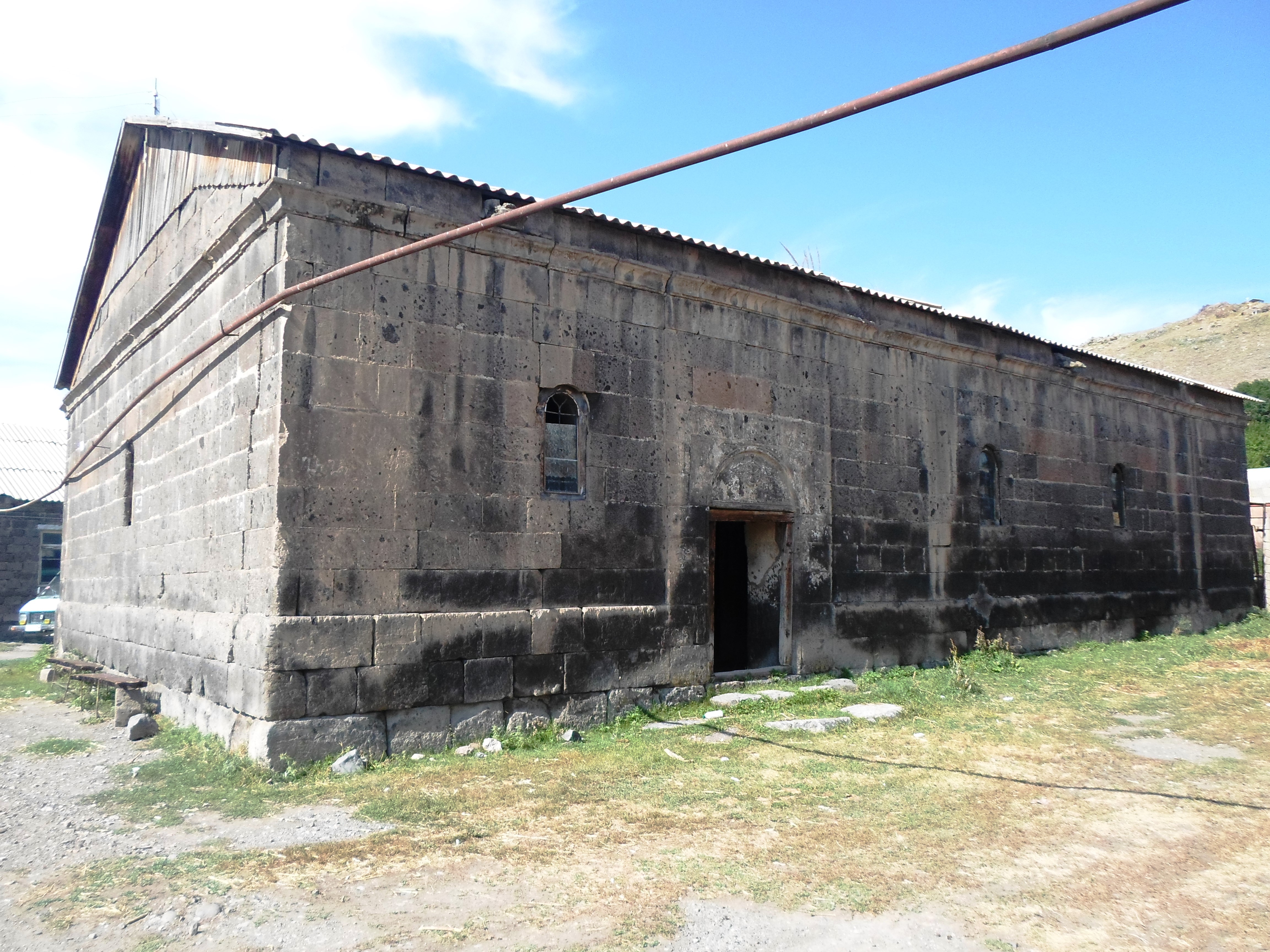
Beniamin church (Zham), 1871
