= Children of Armenia Fund =

Non-profit organization for impoverished Armenian children

Children of Armenia Fund (COAF)
- «Հայաստանի Մանուկներ» Բարեգործական Հիմնադրամ (ՔՈԱՖ)
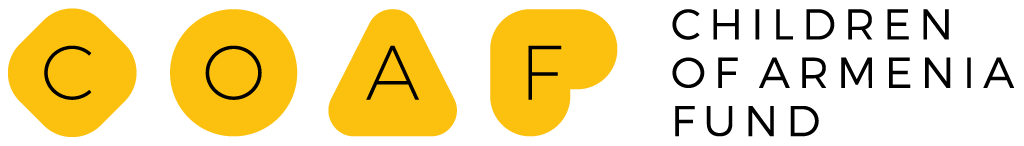

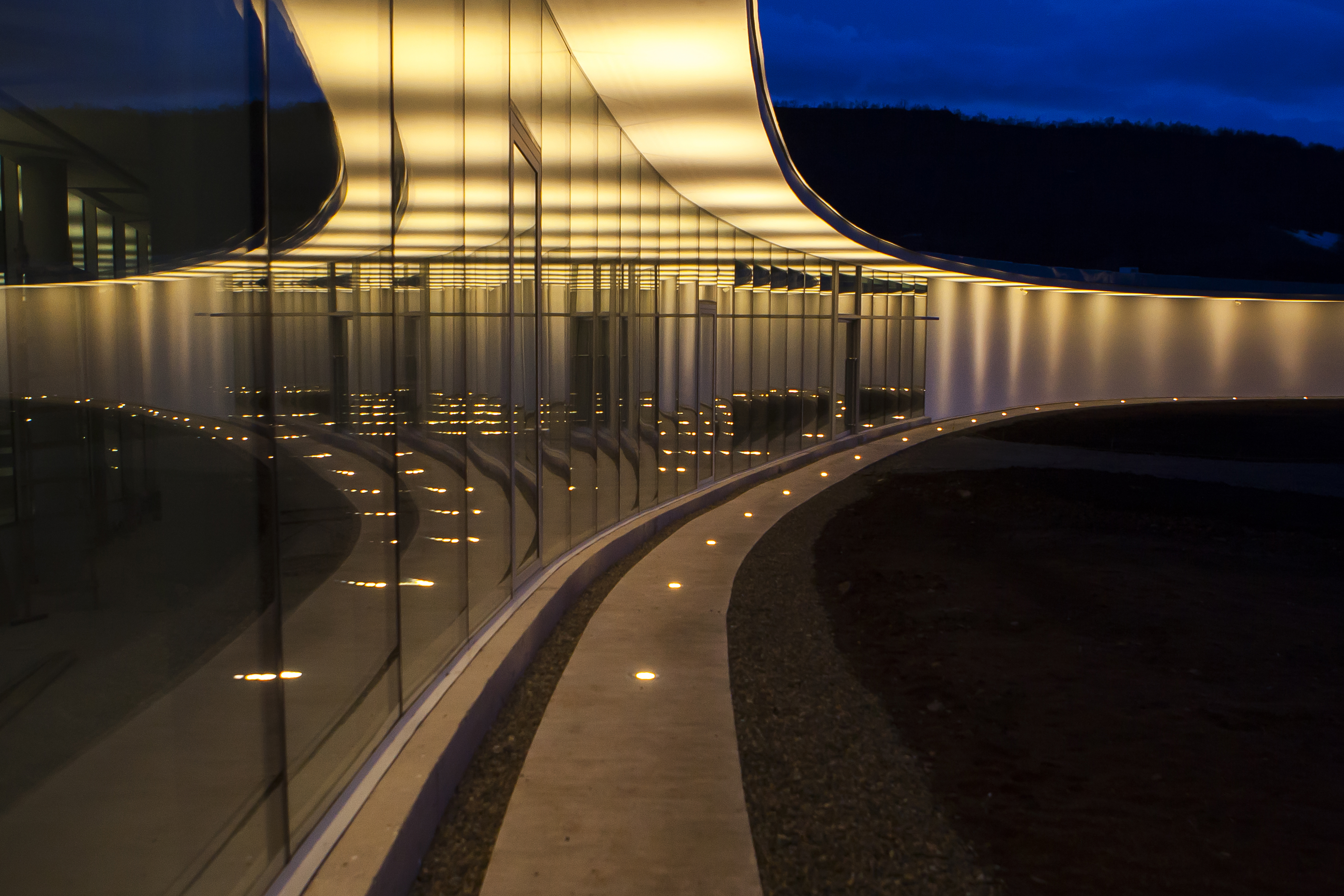
- Abbreviation: COAF
- Founded: 2004
- Type: Charity; Non-profit; Non-governmental; 501(c)(3)
- Purpose: Rural development
- Headquarters: New York City; Yerevan, Armenia
- Location: Armenia
- Region served: 64 rural communities
- Methods: Community development, capacity building, advocacy, youth empowerment
- Key people: Garo H. Armen (founder); Korioun Khatchadourian (director)
- Budget: Up to 50 million USD invested
- Employees: 120 (2020)
- Website: coaf.org

Children of Armenia Fund (COAF) (Armenian: «Հայաստանի Մանուկներ» բարեգործական հիմնադրամ (ՔՈԱՖ)) is a non-profit, non-governmental organization with headquarters in Armenia and the United States focused on child-centered development of rural Armenia. According to the foundation, they have served over 107,000 beneficiaries from 64 rural communities in 6 out of 11 Armenian provinces.

COAF was founded in 2004 after the businessman Garo Armen visited Karakert village in Armenia’s Armavir region and witnessed the level of neglect that rural residents were facing. Consequently, COAF was created to reduce poverty in rural Armenia through “education, healthcare, child and family services, and economic development programs.”

The declared mission of COAF is to “provide resources to children and adults with COAF SMART initiatives to advance rural communities through innovation.” The foundation advocates for an Armenia where all children, youth, and their families have the opportunities and resources to realize their full potential and contribute to the advancement of the world around them.

In 2015, COAF began developing the COAF SMART Initiative to address systemic gaps in rural Armenia. The organization highlights that the COAF SMART Initiative aims at advancing rural communities by increasing access to comprehensive education, technology, and opportunities through a centralized approach. To that end, the COAF SMART Center, a technology-rich educational hub, was established in the Lori Province, Armenia. It is open to the surrounding rural populations, offering after-school programs within the framework of a SMART Citizenship Curriculum for children of age 3 and above.

The organization envisions the SMART Center as a model for rural development and the beginning of a mindset change for a whole generation. Since the opening of their first campus in Lori, COAF aims to launch a SMART Center in each region of Armenia.

The organization meets the standards of international charity assessment organizations such as GuideStar, Better Business Bureau and Charity Navigator.

== History ==
COAF was founded by the US-Armenian businessman and scientist Garo Armen, who was born in Istanbul, Turkey and moved to the US at the age of 17. With a PhD in physical chemistry, Armen has been striving to find new methods of cancer treatment ever since his mother died due to cancer. This loss prompted him to found Agenus, a biotechnology company focused on immunotherapy.

Armen is a recipient of the Ellis Island Medal of Honor for his humanitarian efforts in Armenia. He has been awarded the Mkhitar Heratsi Medal by the President of Armenia. He is also the recipient of the Golden Medal, awarded by the Armavir provincial governor for his investments in the region. Additionally, he was awarded the Honorary Medal by the Prime Minister of Armenia.

According to Armen, his involvement in Armenia took roots in 2000 through various projects including financial assistance for schools, orphanages, and a de-mining project in Artsakh. The idea to create COAF was inspired by a trip through Armenia’s villages in 2003, when Armen along with a group of diaspora Armenians visited one of the poorest villages in the Armavir region, Karakert. For Armen, learning that the villagers didn’t have access to drinking water and were forced to buy it from the nearest city was a decisive driver for the foundation of COAF.

COAF’s work began by addressing the lack of water, heating systems, and sanitary facilities through necessary infrastructure improvements. In 2004, with the organization's first donations, COAF began the renovation of the Karakert school.

Later, COAF began to implement community-based approaches to address issues raised by locals. Based on research outcomes, the organization prioritized four development areas: education, healthcare, child and family services, and economy. COAF emphasizes that these efforts are accompanied by ongoing infrastructure improvements.

After completing renovations of the Karakert kindergarten, medical post, and community center in 2005, nearby villages of the Armavir region started to join COAF’s programs. As a result, COAF expanded its reach to 18 villages in Armavir, implementing community engagement programs and introducing a healthy lifestyle curriculum in schools, after-school programs, psychological support, professional training courses and supervision by COAF experts.

In 2017, COAF, in collaboration with the Armenian Assembly of America, the Armenian General Benevolent Union, the Armenian National Committee of America, and the Diocese and Prelacy of the Armenian Apostolic Church, launched "The Promise to Educate", a campaign to send copies of director Terry George's 2016 film The Promise and relevant Armenian genocide curriculum resources to public educational institutions across the United States.

10 years after its establishment, the organization announced the inclusion of more villages in its network in 2014. To that end, COAF opened the first COAF SMART Center in Debet, Lori in May 2018. The center is a regional education hub designed to connect more villagers to the programs and opportunities offered by COAF, and bring together different regions through hosting organization-wide events. It offers a wide array of resources for children and their families through technologically advanced classrooms and labs. The organization claims to ensure access to all communities by providing transportation to and from villages.

COAF’s after-school programs offered at the COAF SMART Center are part of the SMART Citizenship Curriculum. The name emphasizes COAF’s stated mission to create SMART citizens capable of contributing to the advancement of their communities and the world around them. Collaborative education, including project-based and action-based learning in cognitive, affective and psychomotor domains, take center stage in COAF’s SMART Citizenship Curriculum.

Going beyond its scope of responsibility, the organization launched a humanitarian mission in Artsakh after the 4-day clashes in Artsakh, conducting first aid programs and psychological support, as well as summer camps.

COAF operates in six regions of Armenia and has invested over $50 million in rural development projects since 2004.

== Photos ==
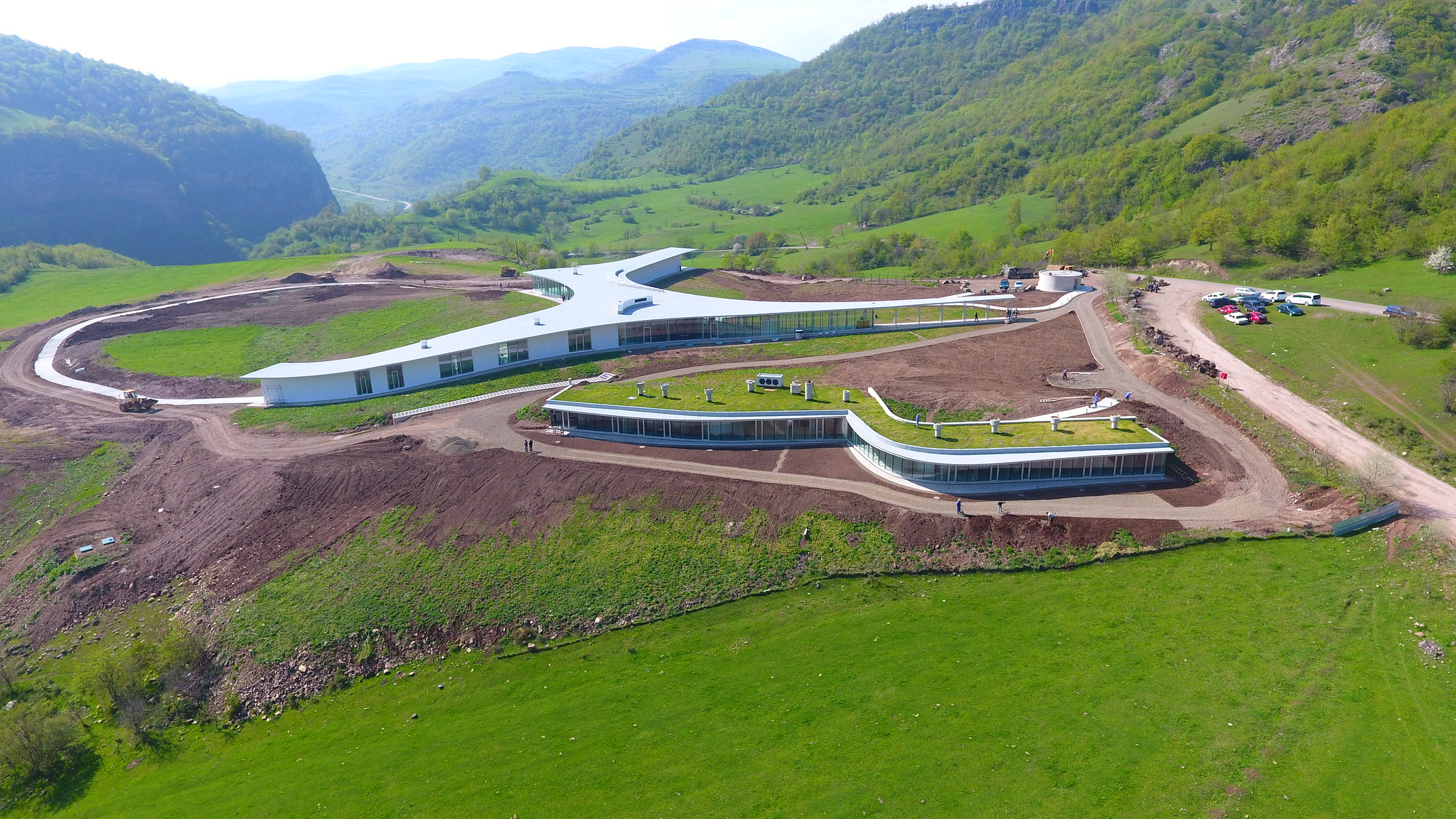
COAF SMART center and concept hotel

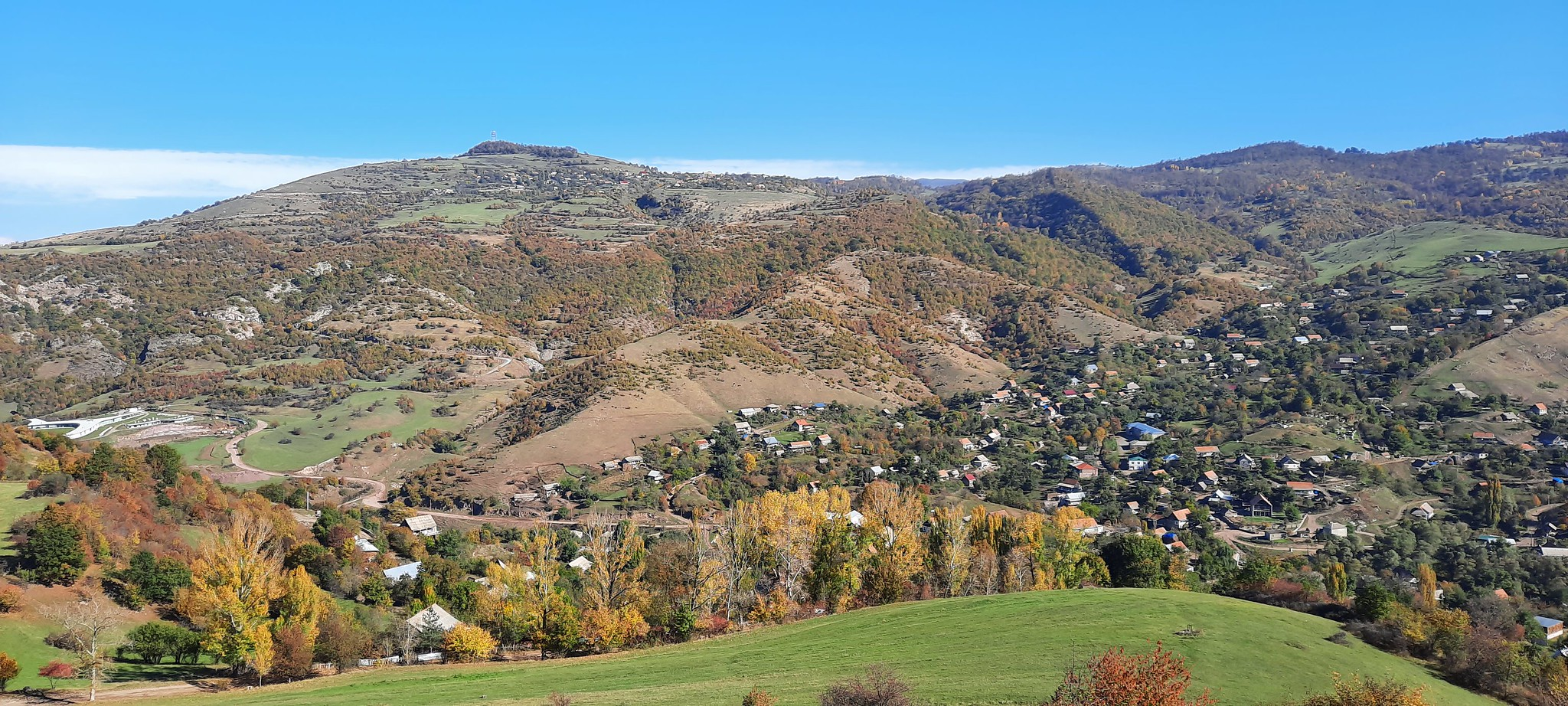
Debet village, Lori

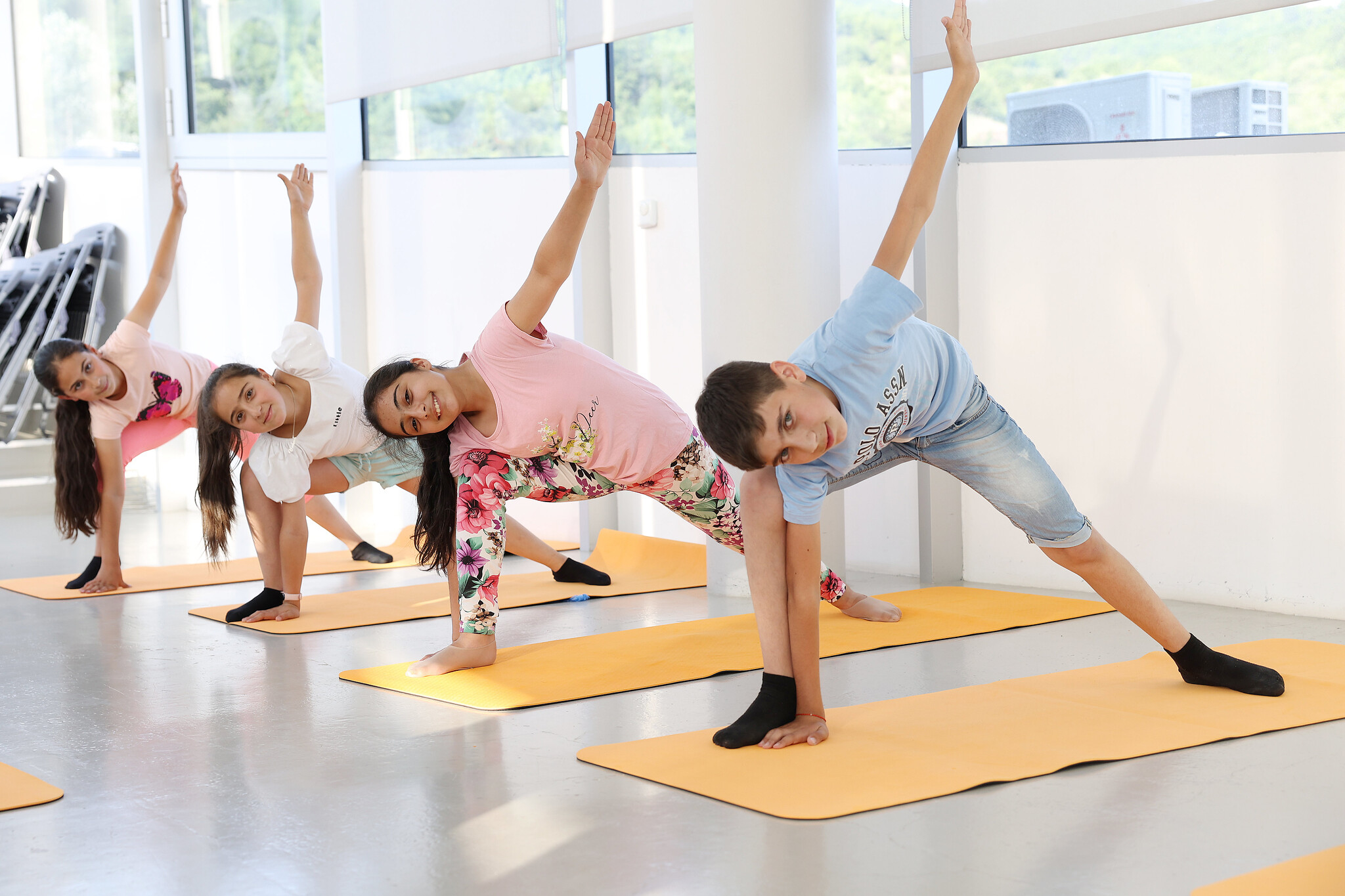
SMART program, yoga

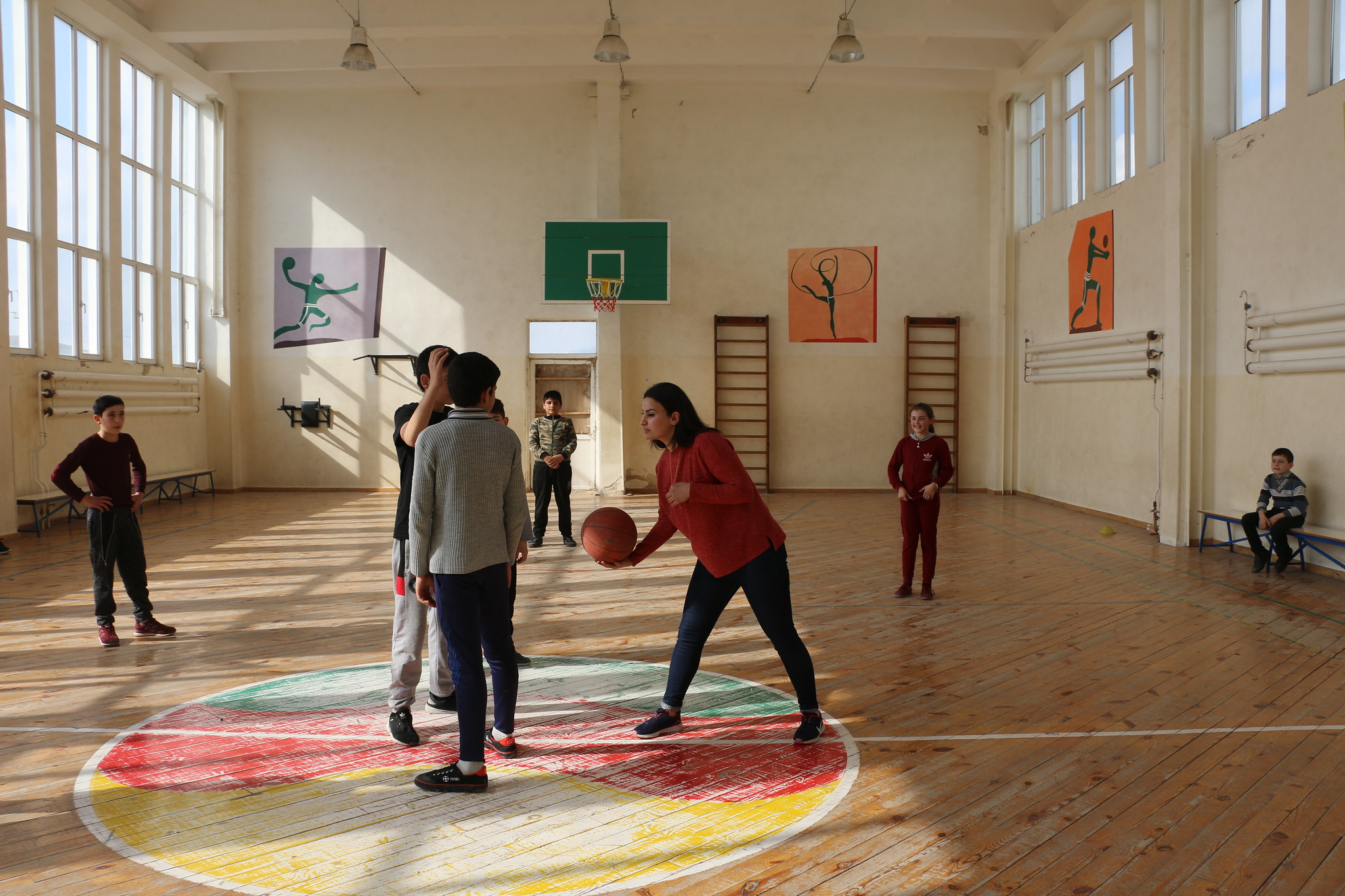
Basketball program in Karakert, Armavir

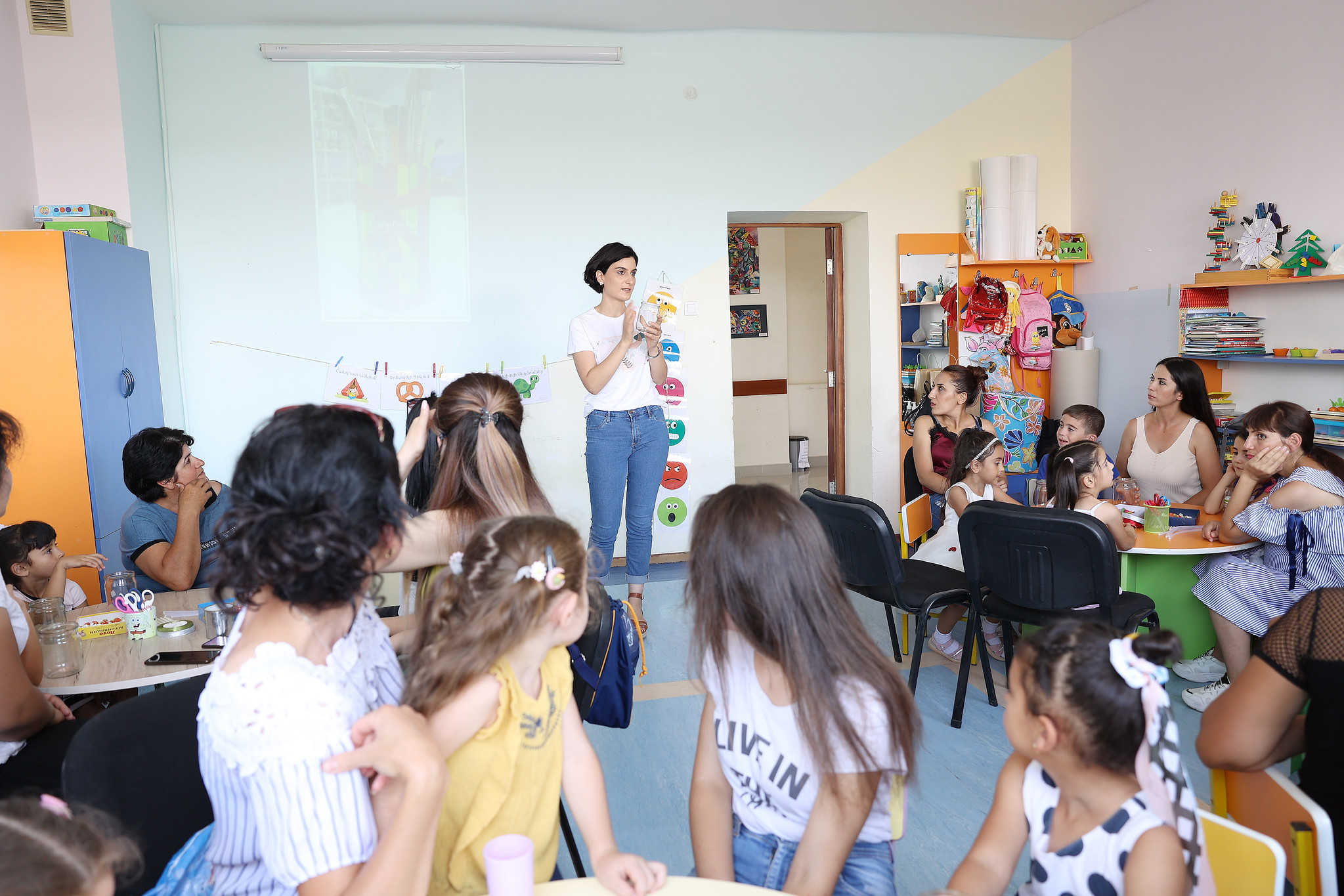
COAF child development program in Myasnikyan, Armavir

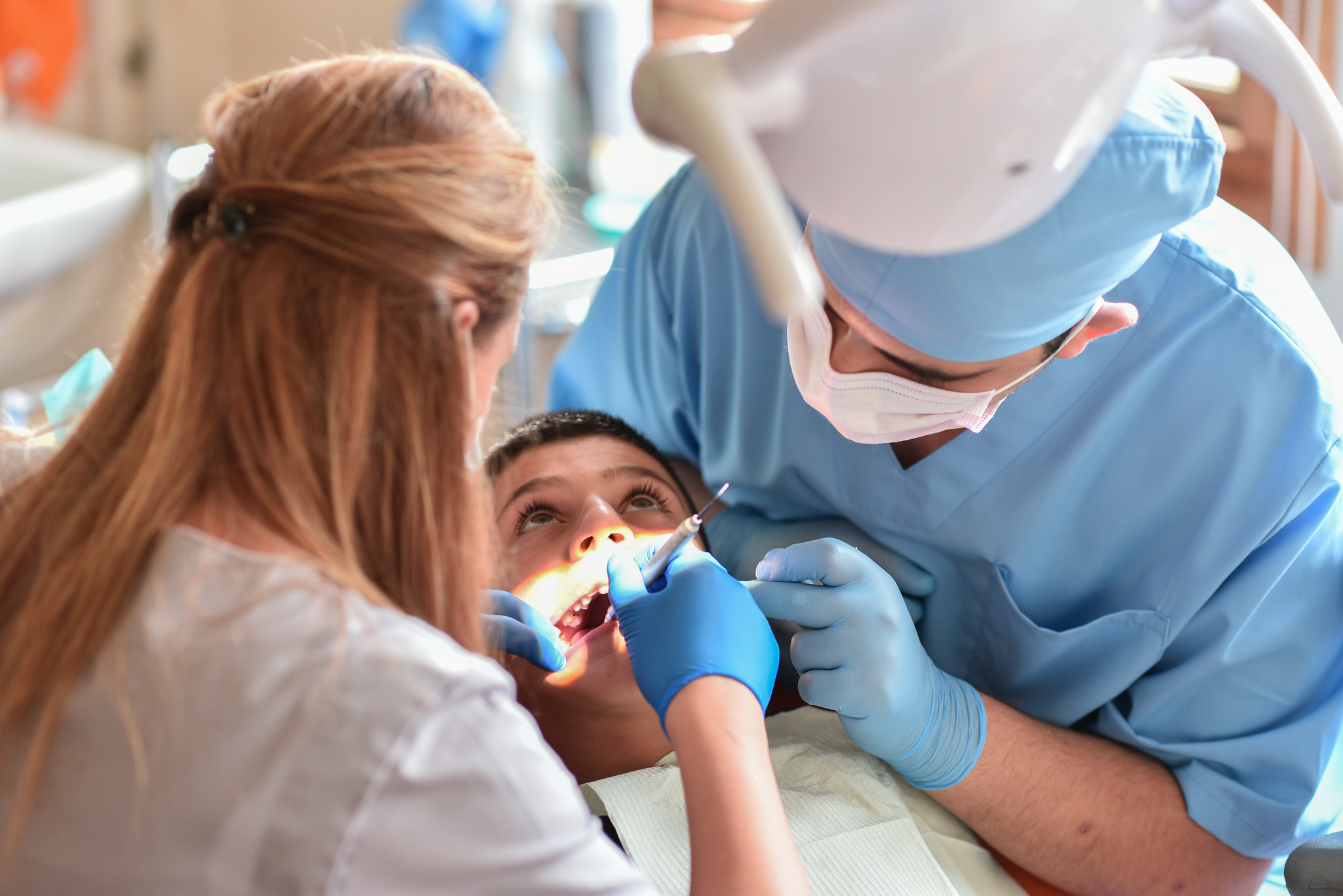
COAF health program

== Structure ==
COAF segments its activities into two components: the village programs and the SMART programs.

=== Village programs ===
Village programs include COAF’s range of programs and services offered to villages and rural regions on an individual basis, relying on a community-based, holistic approach. Along with infrastructure improvements, this includes the implementation of education, health, child and family services, and economic development programs to strengthen rural communities.

==== Education ====
Working closely with village schools, the COAF Education program is set to focus on fostering students’ creativity, critical thinking, talents and potential at school and beyond. The programs are implemented as after school clubs.

For children in grades 3-5:

- drawing
- engineering
- judo
- basketball

Civic education programs are attended by grade 6-10 students:

- debate club
- “Aflatoun” social-financial education

In addition, COAF’s partnership with the U.S. embassy allows the organization to offer:

- an access micro scholarship program designed to provide English classes to rural Armenian youth, so that they can practice their speaking skills and learn about the United States culture․
- online English courses for language learners in remote regions of Armenia, where resources for learning new languages are either limited or non-existent.

Career development support starts with the professional orientation program for students in grades 7-12. This is accompanied by scholarships, mentorship and internship, and an employability skills training series for COAF alumni.

==== Health ====
COAF health programs are intended to enhance the quality of primary health services in villages through programs that promote the well being of the entire community. COAF’s focus is on disease prevention through the promotion of healthy behavior starting from primary school age to early detection. For the organization, capacity building in the health department includes hands-on training for the health administration and medical staff, along with the revitalization of the health facilities.

In terms of medical services, COAF implements early detection of breast, thyroid and prostate cancer through:

- Clinical exams
- Ultrasound exams
- Mammography, biopsy and hormonal tests

COAF's approach to improving villagers’ dental hygiene is through prevention which includes educating children on oral hygiene, fluoridating teeth, ensuring regular tooth-brushing activities by establishing specialized stations (Brushodromes) in schools and providing 1st and 2nd-grade students with toothpaste and toothbrushes.

In cooperation with the Armenian American Health Professionals Organization (AAHPO) COAF implements international missions through which they organize yearly visits to Armenia to provide medical assistance for free in the villages. COAF also closely works with doctors from Great Britain and Canada whose visits to Armenia include doctors’ training to provide new methods and tools to local doctors and nurses, as well as health screenings and consultations for rural inhabitants in Armenia.

In cooperation with World Food Programme, COAF has completed renovations of school cafeterias and provided healthy food to nearly 2,500 elementary school children throughout the five regions.

==== Child and family services ====
COAF provides social support through speech therapy, psychological assistance, social work, and child development services for kids with learning difficulties.

COAF's social work is established in COAF villages. Due to a lack of local professionals, COAF hires specialists to train and work within communities. These social workers provide individual and group support to families and children in rural communities. They also identify issues such as bullying, domestic violence, interpersonal relations, and barriers for people with disabilities as they work both one-on-one and with the whole community.

COAF's psychological services work with kindergartens, schools, families and villagers in various capacities. The organization stresses that professional education in this field is not common in rural communities, so they identify possible specialists, who trains them, and provides guidance, knowledge and professional supervision during the contract period. As a tool of community mindset change, COAF implements a new art therapy program called Drama Therapy, that helps kids open up and express themselves in a creative and constructive way, and includes people with disabilities.

Another component of the Child and Family Services program is the creation of Child Development Centers. These renovated facilities provide a supportive environment to foster early childhood development. They feature both learning and recreational areas for children and are equipped with toys and activities that provide an outlet for self-expression.

==== Economic development ====
One of COAF's declared goals is to achieve economic vitality within Armenia, demonstrating the potential for opportunity and growth within villages to adults and young people.

Some areas of economic development provided by COAF include interest-free loans for local businesses, entrepreneurship training for high school students, and the installation of irrigation water pipelines. These programs aim to provide residents with the tools needed to succeed and generate income, fostering a deeper connection between citizens and their communities.

=== SMART initiatives ===
COAF SMART is a collective and individual development initiative, an innovative approach to improving the quality of life. The SMART Initiative is implemented through the COAF SMART campus, a regional hub intended to bring quality education to rural areas while at the same time serving as a tourism attraction to revitalize the economy.

The first, and so far, only SMART Campus is located in the Lori region in Armenia, near the village of Debet. It consists of the COAF SMART Center and the Concept Hotel by COAF. COAF is working on expanding the campus by constructing a Conference Center and a SMART Sports Complex, both of which are expected to drive in MICE (meetings, incentives, conferences, exhibitions) tourism and contribute to the local economy. The SMART Campus is located on 50 acres of land and is accessible to over 250,000 people from across the region.

==== COAF SMART Center ====
Opened on 27 May 2018, the SMART Center in Lori is an education center where kids learn languages, computer skills, robotics, media literacy, design, music, agriculture, and more.

Education at SMART is provided at no cost. Transportation between the villages and the SMART Center is provided by the organization.

The center provides after-school classes and activities to local youth. They not only have the chance to attend their regular classes, but also are able to participate in festivals, master classes, concerts, and guest speakers’ training.

The Lebanese-Armenian Paul Kaloustian is the architect of the COAF SMART Center. The building was designed to embrace the landscape and exist in harmony with its natural surroundings.

==== Concept hotel ====
The concept hotel is a social enterprise just adjacent to the SMART Center. It contributes to the local economic growth by training locals in the field of hospitality and tourism, creating new employment opportunities, and attracting tourists.

The hotel opened its doors in 2019, and features 12 standard and premium rooms. The architectural design is inspired by a minimalistic, industrial style.

==== Visitor center ====
The visitor center is a tourist information center located at the junction of the roads from Vanadzor to Alaverdi (M6) and Dsegh (H22) and serves both educational and commercial purposes. It offers necessary services to tourists (ATM, payment terminal, drinks, snacks, filling stations, charging sports, etc.), while also providing information about the Lori region and in particular the SMART Center.

==== Conference center ====
The conference center is another social enterprise that the profits of which will be reinvested in the organization’s development programs. The center is designed to stimulate the flow of tourists and organizations to the Lori region of Armenia. The goal is to become the main regional center for conferences, professional training, summer schools and exchange programs for local and international organizations. It will feature 22 hotel rooms to host guests.

==== SMART Sports Complex ====
The COAF SMART Sports Complex targets the promotion of a healthy lifestyle in the rural areas in Lori. The 34,000 sq. ft sports facility will provide a wide range of indoor and outdoor sports opportunities for rural children, including an Olympic-size swimming pool, gym, tennis court, cycling track and more. At the same time, the new addition to the SMART Campus marks COAF’s third social enterprise, meaning that it will be available for sports events, corporate retreats, training and meetings. All profits will be donated to COAF’s programs.

==== SMART rooms ====
Prior to the opening of the COAF SMART Center, COAF had launched SMART rooms within the villages. These education rooms feature necessary equipment and an internet connection to provide local people with new possibilities. It helps connect communities with each other and the world. By installing SMART rooms the organization aims to provide education in self-development, medicine, social services, computer literacy, and media literacy.

These rooms are present in the Lori and Tavush regions enable people to continue their education during the winter months when traveling in the Lori region is difficult. SMART rooms are accessible not only for rural youth but also neighboring communities.

==== SMART village ====
The organization has launched a SMART village initiative, aiming at transforming Armenian villages into SMART communities. COAF has chosen Debet village in the Lori region as a pilot project, where the organization aims to implement capacity building, economic development and infrastructure projects, including the renovation of the village school, kindergarten, and municipality building, as well as road and roof reparations, and the installment of street lighting and a high-speed internet connection.

== Fundraising ==
Each December, COAF holds a fundraising gala event in New York City. Friends and philanthropists gather to celebrate the year's success, hear children from Armenian villages share their personal stories, and learn about the impact COAF has made. The annual COAF Gala consists of a charity dinner, concert, live auction, and silent auction.

Every year COAF raises millions of dollars to implement its programs for the next year.

Additionally, COAF maintains strong partnerships with different companies and institutions, such as the Armenian government and the United States government, international organizations, banks, and local companies that have sustainable CSR.

== Corporate structure ==
Children of Armenia Fund has two headquarters – one in New York City and one in Yerevan, Armenia.

The New York office primarily focuses on fundraising, donor relations, and the annual COAF Gala event. The board of directors is also based in New York, and includes writer Peter Balakian and actor Joe Manganiello.

The Yerevan office is responsible for the fieldwork, programs implementation, new initiatives, impact monitoring, community advancement guidance, government relations, partner cooperation, specialists’ training and kids empowerment.

COAF's managing director is Korioun Khatchadourian. COAF staff consists of 140 employees and more than 200 contractors in Armenian regions and villages.
