= Debet, Armenia =

Debet Դեբետ
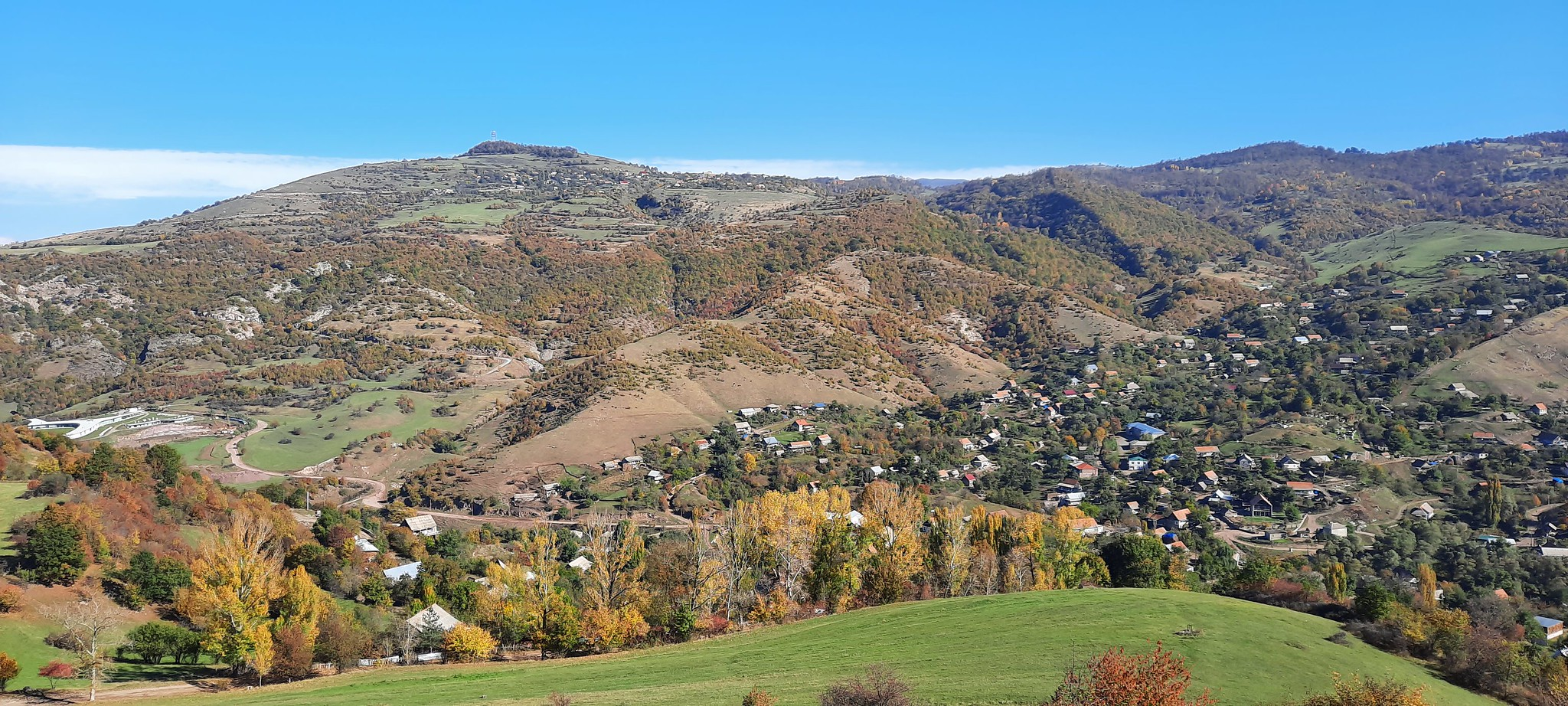

- Location within Armenia
- Coordinates: 40°55′03″N 44°38′57″E
- Country: Armenia
- Marz (Province): Lori
- Elevation: 1,100 m (3,600 ft)

Population (2011)
  - Total: 821
- Time zone: UTC+4 ( )

Debet (Armenian: Դեբետ, also Romanized as Debed; formerly, Khachigyukh) is a village in the Lori Province of Armenia, seated on the right bank of the Pambak river in the northern Lori region of Armenia.

Before being named Debet in 1935 the village had a double name Alereksi-Khachi gyugh. Debet was founded in 1857 by the very well known person in that region named Gevorg Mahtesi. He also had a nickname, Cholakh which translated into English means “limping”. Gevorg Mahtesi lived in the village called Marts which is not far from Debet. What the story tells us is that Mahtesi convinced a number of families from Marts to move to this new location and found a village. There are many words in the Debet colloquial language belonging to the Karabakh language group, which proves that the former homeland of a number of families who moved from Marts to Alereks was Nagorno Karabakh.

== Development programs ==
In 2015 some programs started to be implemented in Debet by Children of Armenia Fund.

Arts clubs, music and dance clubs, debate clubs, English language instruction, social and psychological assistance, child development center, psychological theater, support to children with learning difficulties, health and lifestyle education, school nutrition & brushodromes, free dental care, women health screenings, support for reproductive health were implemented in the village. Playground, cafeteria and brushodrome were created and renovated in the village by COAF.

In may, 2018 COAF SMART Center was opened in the village of Debet. This is an education hub for children and adults to gain new skills, ideas, create and find new path in their lives.

== Photos ==
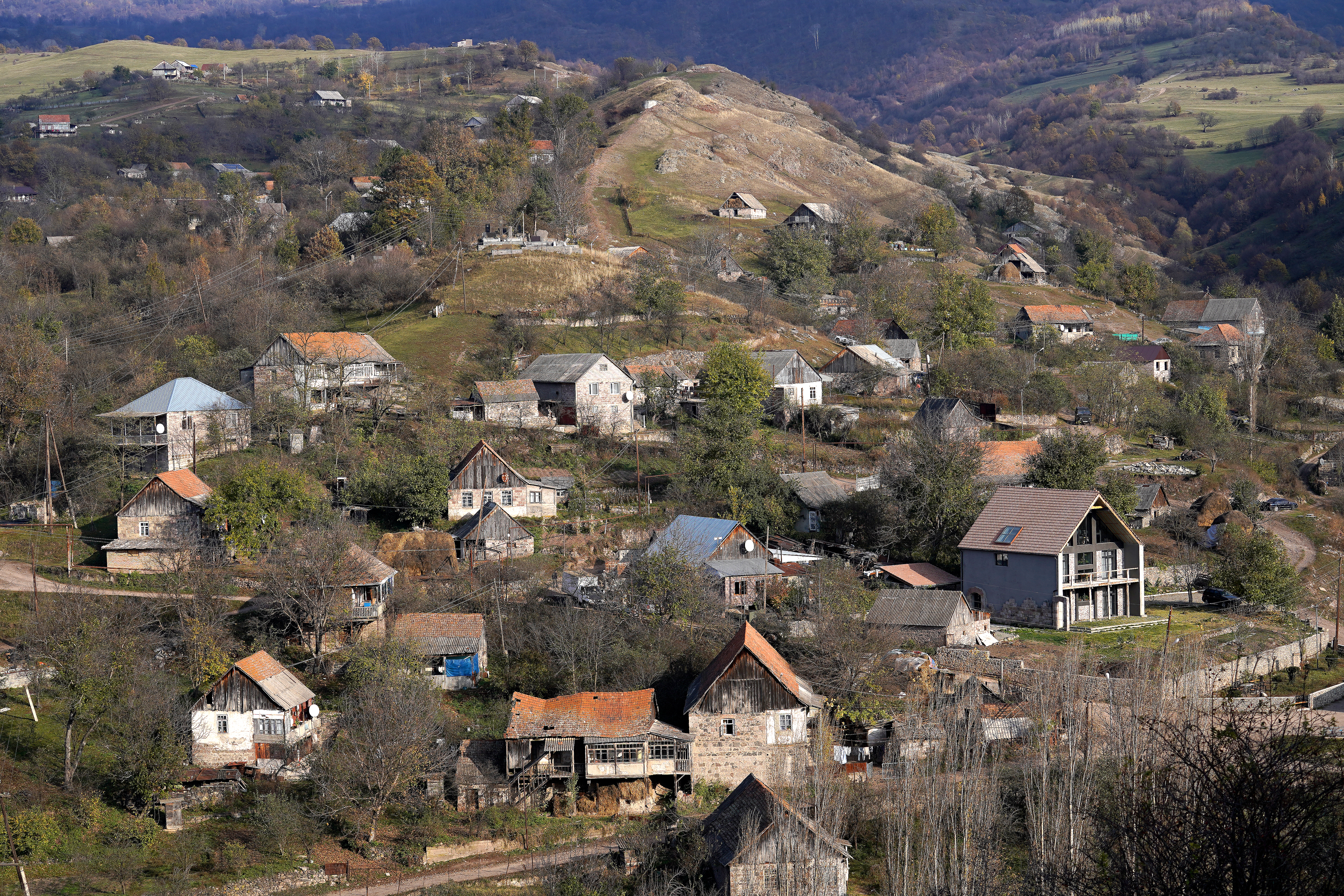
View to Debet village from the hiking trail to Yeghegnut village

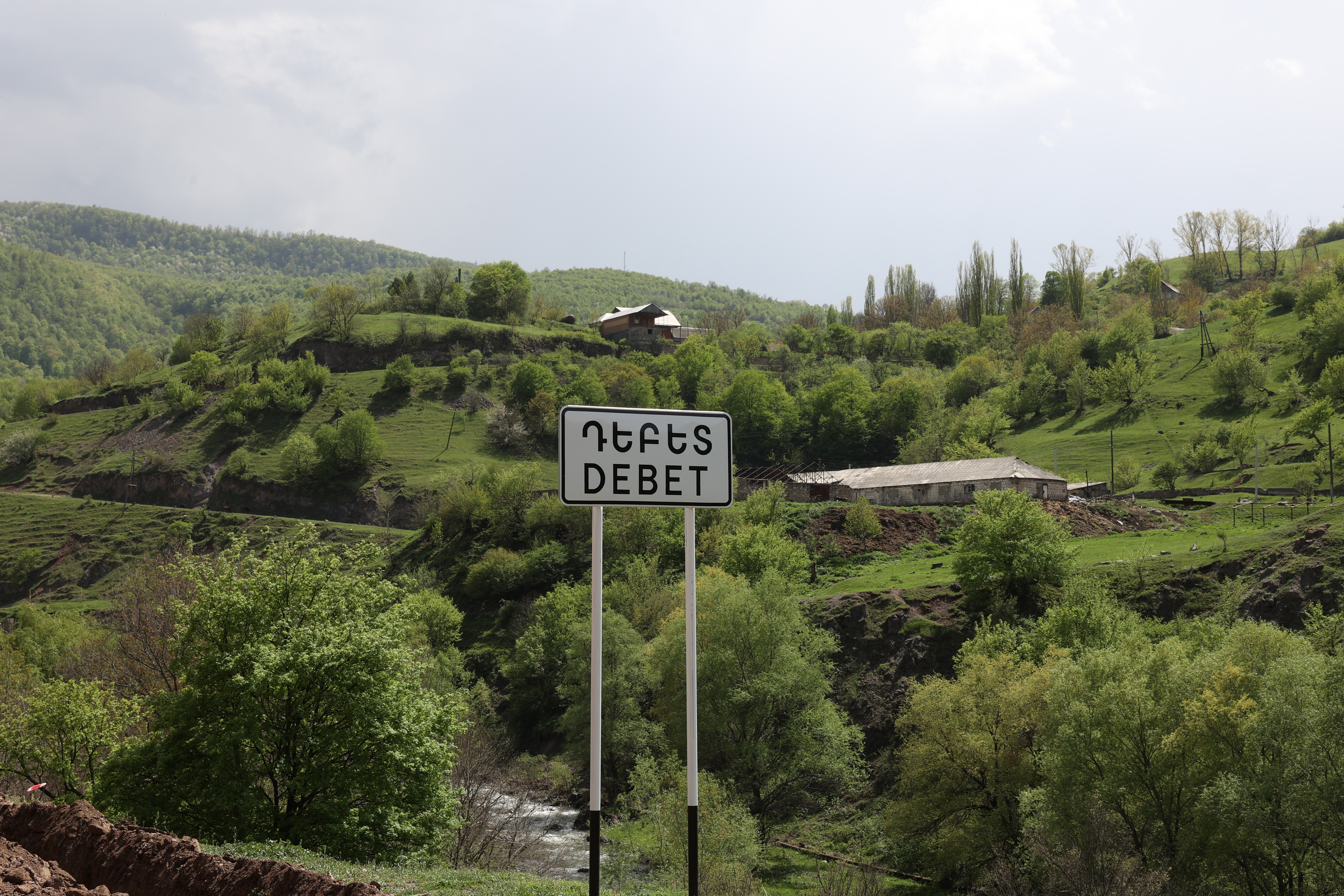
Entrance to Debet village

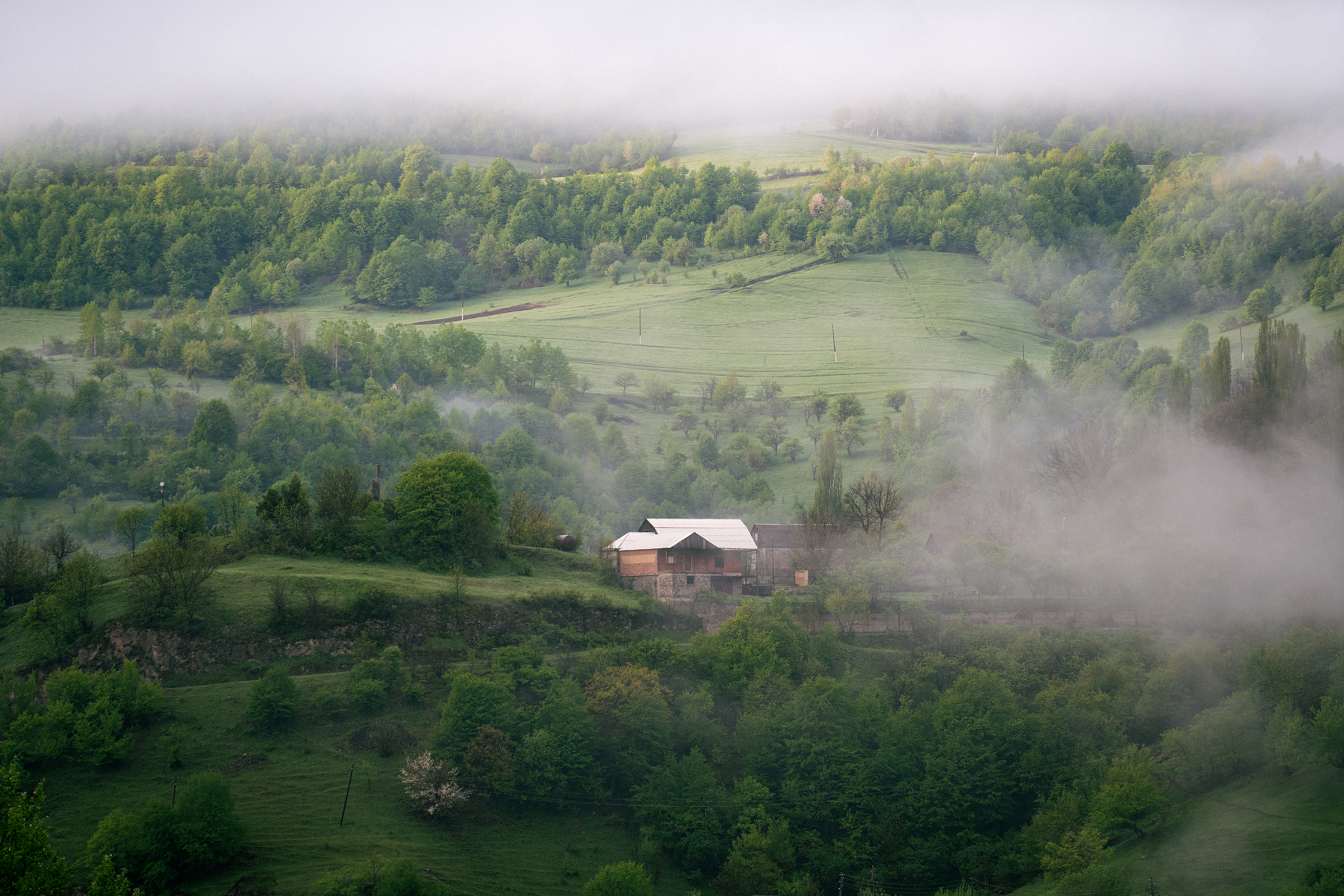
A house in Debet village

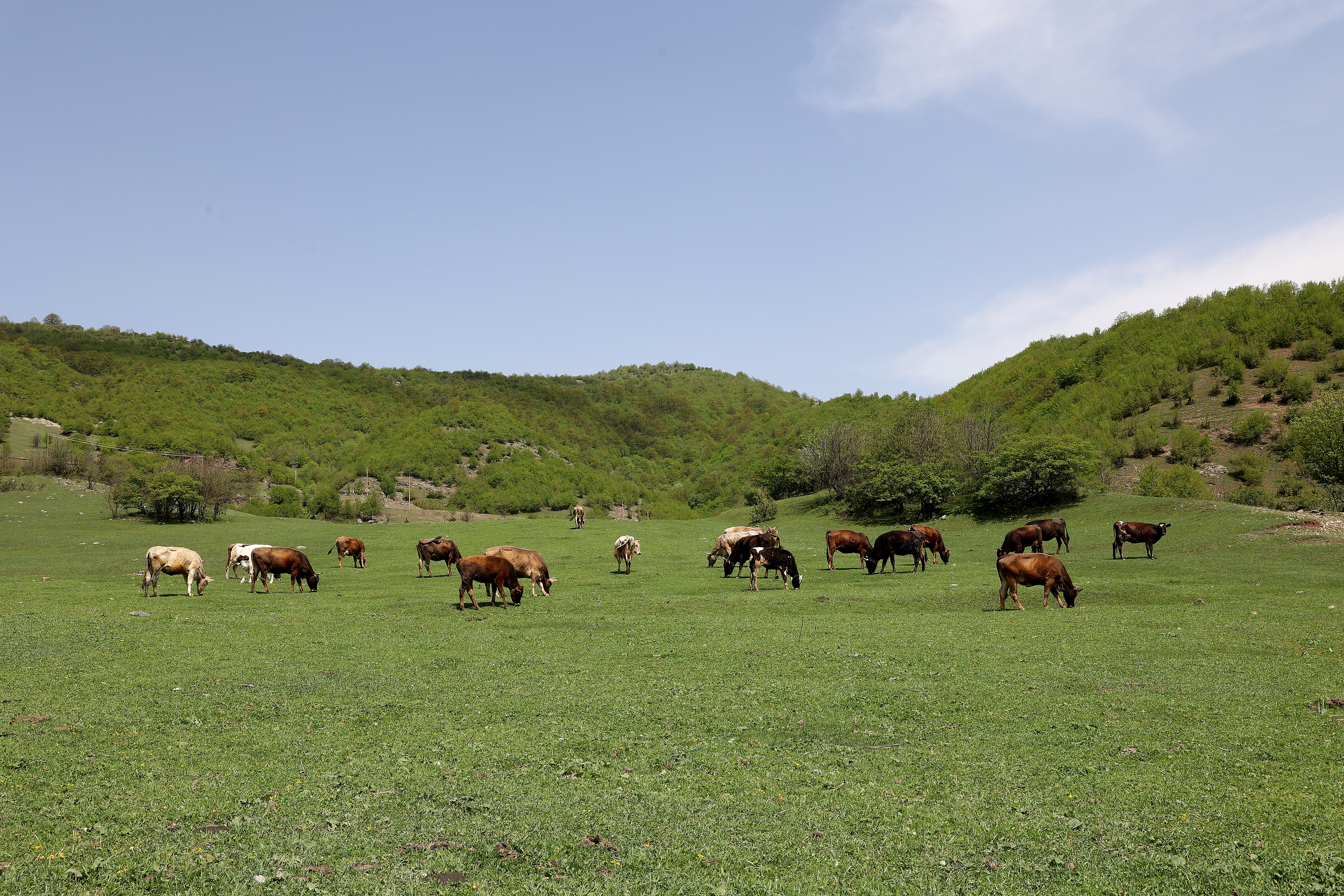
Grazing animals in Debet village

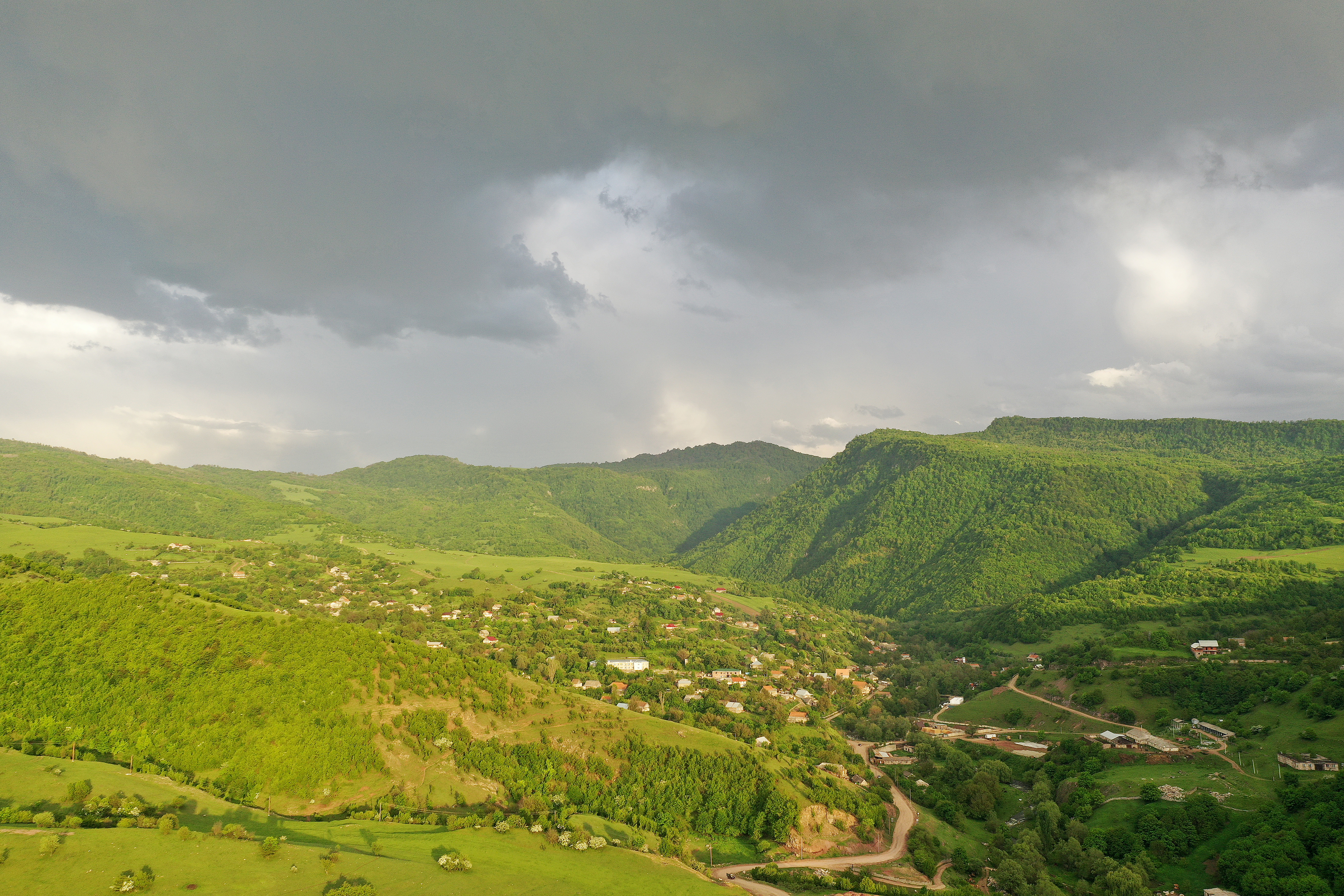
Bird's eye view of Debet village

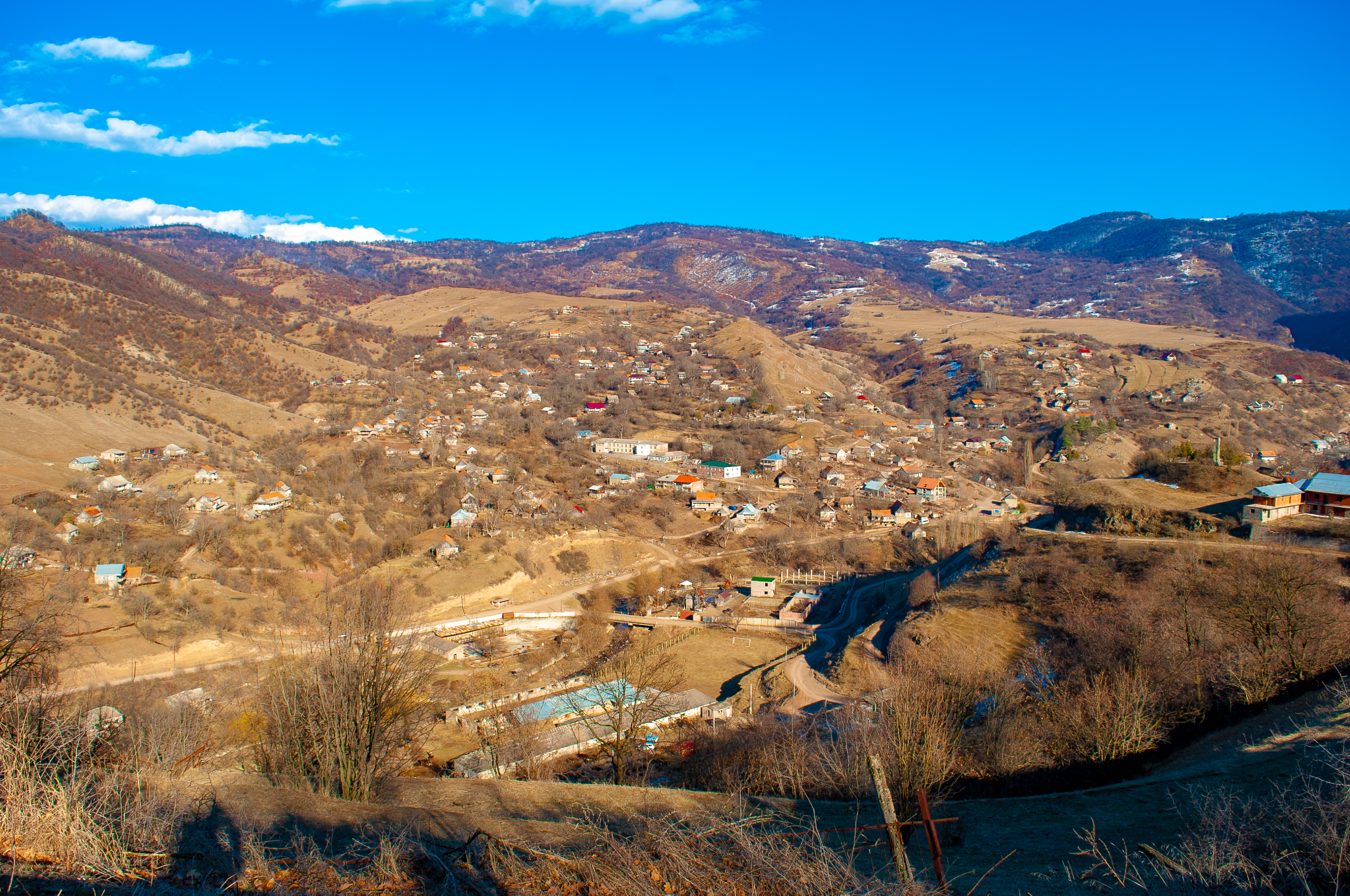
Panoramic view of Debet

== See also ==
- Lori province
- Children of Armenia Fund
