= Garo H. Armen =

Turkish-born American businessman (born 1953)

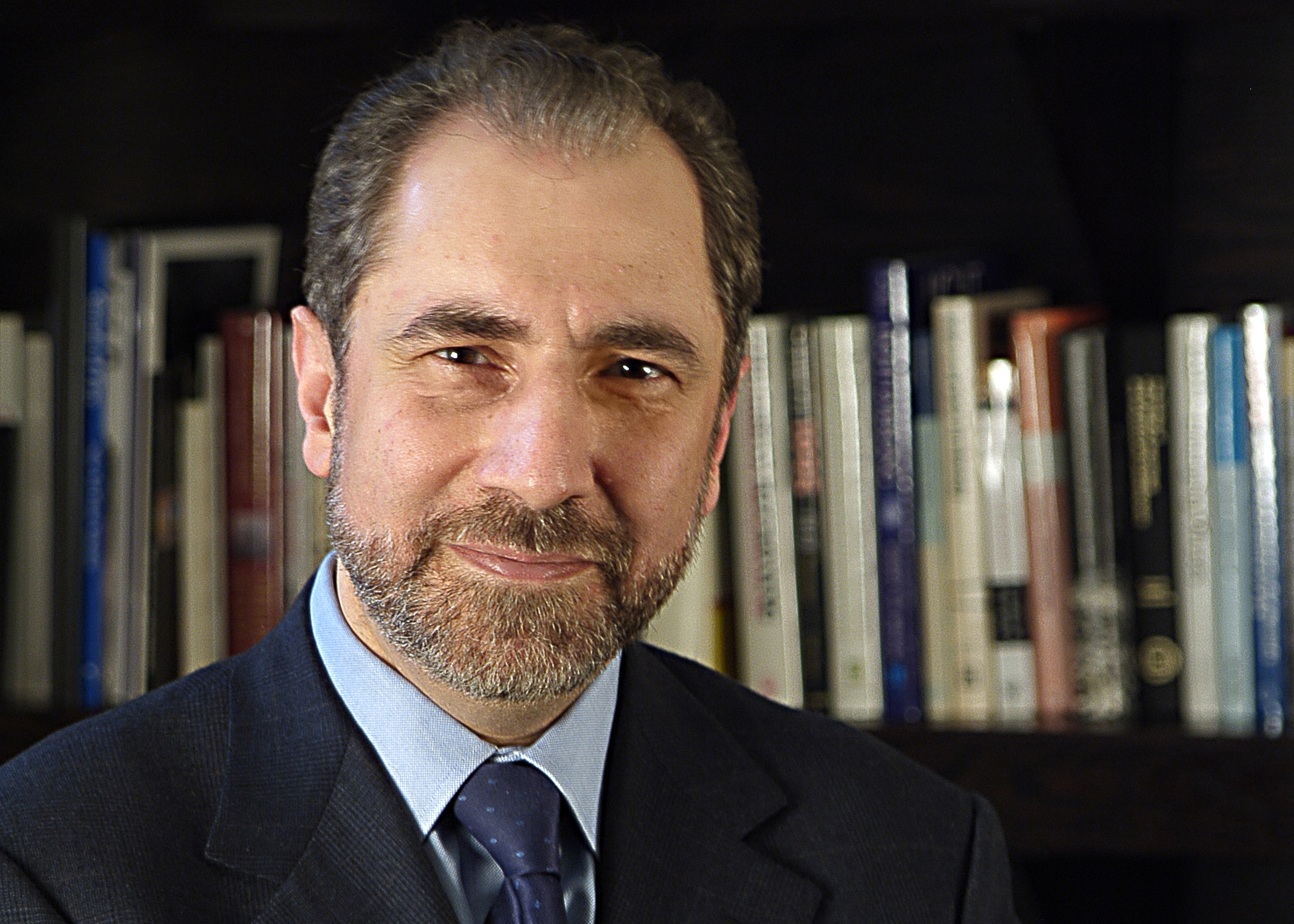
- Born: January 31, 1953 (age 73); Istanbul, Turkey
- Education: City University of New York (PhD)
- Occupation: Businessman
- Known for: Co-founder and CEO of Agenus; Chairman of the Children of Armenia Fund

Garo H. Armen (Armenian: Կարո Արմեն) is an American businessman. He is the co-founder and CEO of Agenus, Inc, as well as the chairman of the Children of Armenia Fund (COAF).

== Early life ==
Armen was born in Istanbul, Turkey, in 1953, Armen moved to the United States in 1970. He began his career at Brookhaven National Laboratory after earning his PhD in Physical Chemistry from the City University of New York. He later transitioned to Wall Street, where he founded Armen Partners, a firm specializing in healthcare investments. His efforts resulted in key industry mergers, including the union of Immunex Corporation and Lederle Oncology.

== Career ==
Armen is the chairman and CEO of Agenus Inc., a biotechnology company he co-founded in 1994, focused on immunotherapies to fight cancer. One of Agenus’ achievements is the development of the BOT/BAL combination therapy, which has demonstrated success in difficult-to-treat cancers, including metastatic colorectal cancer. This therapy reawakens the immune system’s natural ability to fight cancer, representing a significant advancement in the treatment of cancers that were once considered insurmountable.

Armen is also the chairman of Mink Therapeutics, which is developing novel cell therapies that modulate immune responses. These therapies aim to treat both cancer and a range of immune disorders, providing a new approach to managing complex diseases.

He also spearheaded the restructuring of Elan Corporation, guiding the company through a period that ultimately saved it from collapse. He also serves as the executive chairman of Protagenic Therapeutics, a company focused on therapies for neurological and metabolic disorders.

== Humanitarian work ==
Armen founded the Children of Armenia Fund (COAF) in 2003. COAF has implemented over $100 million worth of projects, aiming to improve education, healthcare, and social programs across more than 100 villages in rural Armenia.

== Honors ==
In 2002, Ernst & Young recognized Armen as the NYC Biotechnology Entrepreneur of the Year.

In 2004, he received the Ellis Island Medal of Honor for his humanitarian efforts in Armenia.

In 2016, the Immigrant Learning Center in Malden, MA named him as an Immigrant Entrepreneur of the Year.

In 2024, he received the World Innovation, Technology and Services Alliance's Highest Award, the Eminent Person Award.
