= Agenus =

Biotechnology company

Agenus Inc.
- Type: Public
- Traded as: Nasdaq: AGEN; Russell 2000 Component
- Industry: Biotechnology; Pharmaceutical Company
- Founded: 1994; 32 years ago
- Founders: Garo H. Armen, Pramod K. Srivastava
- Headquarters: 3 Forbes Road, Lexington, Massachusetts, USA
- Key people: Garo H. Armen; (chairman and CEO); Jennifer Buell; (president and COO)
- Revenue: ▲US$ 80.0 million (2025 YTD)
- Net income: ▲US$ 7.5 million (2025 YTD)
- Total assets: ▼US$ 233.9 million (2025)
- Total equity: ▼US$ -280.9 million (2025)
- Website: www.agenusbio.com

Agenus Inc. is a Lexington, Massachusetts-based biotechnology company focused on immunotherapy including immuno-oncology, a field that uses the immune system to control or cure cancer. The company is developing checkpoint modulators (CPMs), patient-specific anti-cancer vaccines, and adjuvants designed for use with various vaccines. CPM development is a particularly fast-moving field, since early products have produced unprecedented clinical benefits for patients.

== History ==
Agenus (formerly Antigenics Inc.) was founded in 1994 by Garo H. Armen and Pramod K. Srivastava. The company has pioneered immunotherapies, including heat shock protein-based cancer vaccines, a program that has developed into its Prophage Series of personalized anti-cancer vaccines. Antigenics became a public company in February 2000 on the NASDAQ exchange with the ticker symbol AGEN. In 2000 Agenus acquired Aquila Biopharmaceuticals and a year later it acquired Aronex Pharmaceuticals. In February 2014 the company acquired a European firm, 4-Antibody, along with their portfolio of checkpoint modulators (CPMs) and a platform (Retrocyte Display® technology) to rapidly and efficiently discover new antibodies.

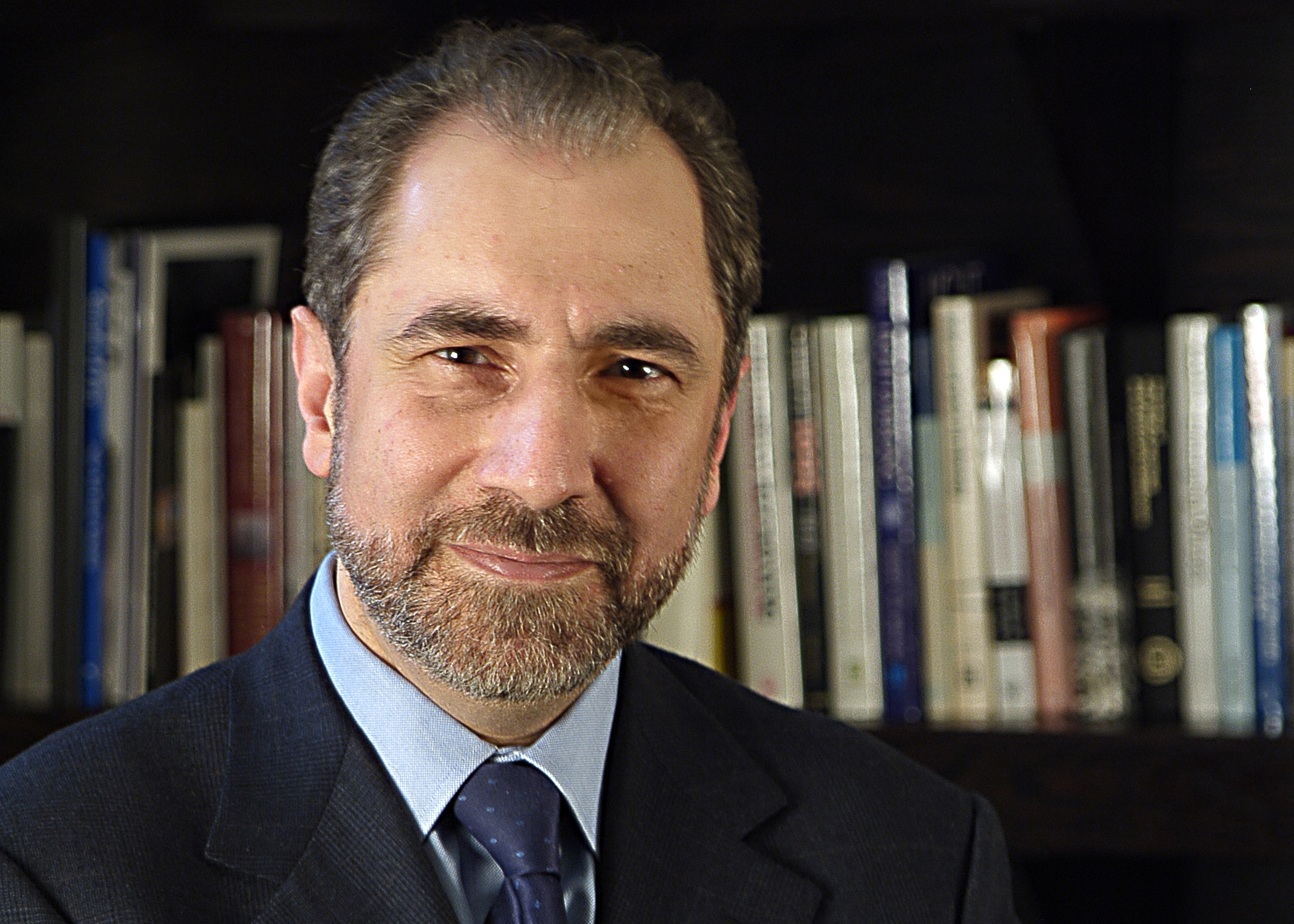
CEO Garo Armen

In October 2013, Agenus CEO Garo Armen issued a press release revealing that after an 18-month follow up on the RTS,S Malaria vaccine using QS21-Stimulon®, it was working well enough to support a regulatory filing in 2014. This was the first proof of the efficacy of Agenus's patented "QS-21 Stimulon" adjuvant

In April 2014, Agenus signed a deal with Merck potentially worth $100 million. Under the terms of that deal, Agenus is using its proprietary Retrocyte Display technology to discover antibodies against a pair of undisclosed checkpoint targets for the treatment of cancer. Agenus has advanced two of its own CPM candidates into early drug development and the company is planning to advance several more antibodies in clinical trials.

Today, Agenus is focused on developing a range of immuno-oncology products, including the Prophage vaccines, multiple checkpoint modulators (also known as checkpoint inhibitors or checkpoint antibodies) and its QS21-Stimulon adjuvant. The company's personalized, heat shock protein-based vaccines are in Phase 2 studies. The QS-21 Stimulon adjuvant platform is partnered with GlaxoSmithKline and Janssen. Several of those collaborations involve Phase 3 trials. Altogether, the company and its partners are sponsoring approximately 20 clinical trials of Agenus products.

In August 2023, Agenus announced a strategic restructuring to prioritize its botensilimab and balstilimab (BOT/BAL) clinical programs. The plan included a 25% reduction in its workforce (approximately 85 positions) and the temporary suspension of most preclinical and clinical programs not related to the BOT/BAL combination. The company stated the reorganization was intended to reduce annual operating expenses by approximately $40 million.

In 2025, Agenus sold their CDMO business to Zydus Lifesciences including their two biologics manufacturing sites in Emeryville and Berkeley. In addition, they would partner with Zydus to commercialize their molecules in India.

== Key partners and deals ==
In April 2014, Agenus announced a collaboration and licensing agreement with Merck. The collaboration involved the discovery and development of therapeutic antibodies to two undisclosed Merck checkpoint targets, both thought to be relevant for cancer treatment, in addition to Agenus using its proprietary Retrocyte Display® platform to discover and optimize antibodies against the targets.

In February 2014, Agenus acquired European biotechnology firm 4-Antibody, along with its Retrocyte Display technology and a portfolio of checkpoint modulator antibody candidates .

In March 2012, GlaxoSmithKline acquired two extra rights in the two firms' agreement to use Agenus' QS-21 Stimulon adjuvant. The rights give GSK the first right in negotiation of purchase of Agenus or their assets, the rights expired in 2017 after five years had lapsed.

In June 2025, Agenus entered into a strategic collaboration with Zydus Lifesciences valued at up to $141 million. Under the agreement, Agenus transferred its biologics manufacturing facilities in Emeryville and Berkeley, California, to a new Zydus subsidiary, Zylidac Bio LLC, for an upfront payment of $75 million. The deal also included a $16 million equity investment by Zydus in Agenus common stock and up to $50 million in potential milestone payments. Additionally, Zydus obtained exclusive rights to develop and commercialize the botensilimab and balstilimab (BOT/BAL) combination therapy in India and Sri Lanka, with Agenus eligible for a 5% royalty on net sales. The transaction was formally closed in January 2026.

== Product descriptions ==
Checkpoint modulators (CPMs) interfere with cancers’ ability to “hijack” natural immune defense systems. To protect the body against disease, but without attacking healthy cells, the immune system uses multiple “checkpoint” systems. Some checkpoints stimulate immune responses while others inhibit them. Cancer cells can evolve means to evade checkpoints, and CPMs can reverse that effect, helping the immune system better fight the cancer.

Agenus has programs targeting the checkpoint modulators GITR, OX40, CTLA-4, LAG-3, TIM-3 and PD-1. The company is expanding that portfolio by using a proprietary process to generate fully human therapeutic antibody drug candidates. The platform is a high-throughput approach incorporating IgG format human antibody libraries expressed in mammalian B-lineage cells.

The Prophage series of patient-specific cancer vaccine candidates can also enhance the immune system's response to tumors. Because each cancer is unique, the vaccine is derived from the patient's own tumor sample. To process these samples, Agenus has established a multi-product "good manufacturing practices" facility, which has already helped process over 1,000 tumor samples from across the globe.

The company's QS-21 Stimulon® adjuvant platform strengthens and broadens immune responses to antigens on cancers or foreign invaders’ surfaces. Agenus has multiple partnerships around this product to study its effects with vaccines for diseases including Alzheimer's, melanoma, and malaria. In October 2013, GlaxoSmithKline and Agenus announced positive data from an 18-month follow-up of GSK's RTS,S malaria vaccine with QS21-Stimulon. GSK stated that the treatment was working well enough to support a regulatory filing. RTS,S is the most advanced vaccine for malaria in development.

Agenus is the sole US-manufacturer of a patented and FDA-approved triterpene glycoside extract known as (QS-21, Matrix M), which is a key component in the manufacturing of the Oxford–AstraZeneca COVID-19 as well as the Novavax COVID-19 vaccines. Supplies are tightly controlled, and the US has invoked the US Defence Production Act to preserve vaccine raw materials for its own companies.

== Articles ==
- Wall Street Journal article on company and FDA
