= Lorut =

Lorut Լորուտ
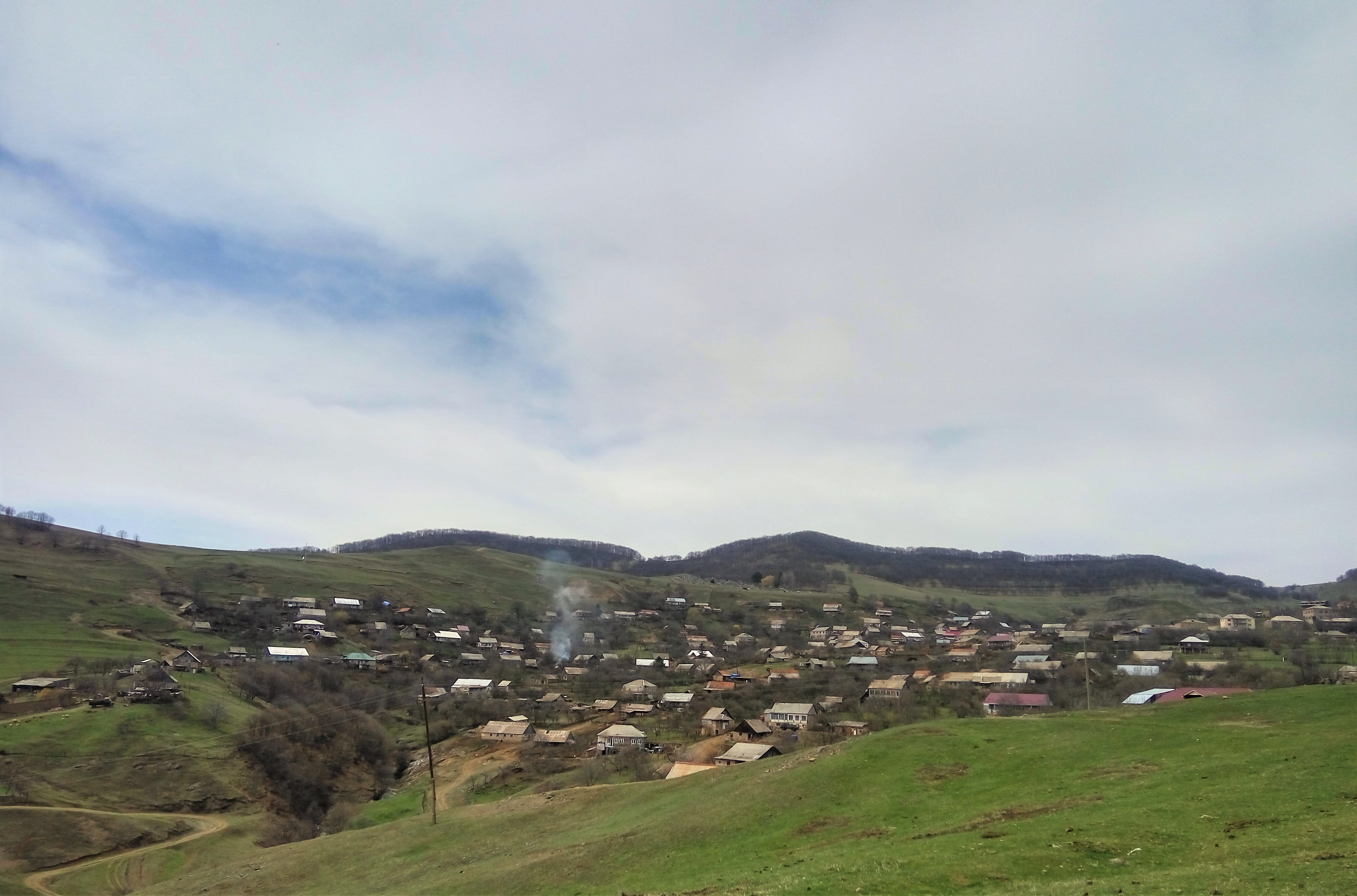

- Location within Armenia
- Coordinates: 40°56′20″N 44°46′21″E
- Country: Armenia
- Marz (Province): Lori
- Elevation: 1,499 m (4,918 ft)

Population (2011)
  - Total: 843
- Time zone: UTC+4 ( )
  - Summer (DST): UTC+5

Lorut (Armenian: Լորուտ), is a village in the Lori Province of Armenia. It belongs to the municipality of Tumanyan.

== See also ==
- Khoronk
