= Varzhapetyan =

Varzhapetyan is a surname. Notable people with the surname include:

- Karlen Varzhapetyan (1942–1984), Soviet Armenian television director
- Rima Varzhapetyan-Feller, Armenian woman of Jewish origin
