= Karlen Varzhapetyan =

Film director (b. 1942, d. 1984)

- Born: Garabed Varzhabedian; 10 May 1942; Aleppo, Syria
- Died: 16 July 1984 (aged 42); Yerevan, Armenian SSR, USSR
- Awards: Honored Artist of the Armenian SSR (posthumous)

Karlen Varzhapetyan (Armenian: Կարլեն Վարժապետյան; 10 May 1942 – 16 July 1984) was a Soviet Armenian director of television plays. He was posthumously named 'Honored Artist of the Armenian Soviet Socialist Republic'.

== Selected Television Plays ==
- Uncle Vanya (Anton Chekhov) (Armenian: Քեռի Վանյա, romanized: Keri Vanya)
- The Land of Nairi (Yeghishe Charents) (Armenian: Երկիր Նաիրի, romanized: Yerkir Nairi)
- Romeo and Juliet (William Shakespeare) (Armenian: Ռոմեո և Ջուլիետ, romanized: Romeo yev Juliyet)
- Metsamor (Hrant Matevosyan) (Armenian: Մեծամոր, romanized: Metsamor)
- Neutral Zone (Hrant Matevosyan) (Armenian: Չեզոք գոտի, romanized: Chezok goti)
- Kibossa, 7th Century (Hayk Vardanyan) (Armenian: Կիբոսա. 7-րդ դար, romanized: Kibosa. 7-rd dar)
- Whore (Krikor Zohrab) (Armenian: Փոստալ, romanized: Postal)
- A Piece of Sweetness (Note: Literally "a clove of sweet heart.") (Shahan Shahnour) (Armenian: Պճեղ մը անուշ սիրտ, romanized: Pchegh my anush sirt)
- The Poor Arab (Note: Based on William Saroyan's short story "The Poor and Burning Arab" published in the collection My Name is Aram.) (William Saroyan) (Armenian: Խեղճուկրակ արաբը, romanized: Kheghchukrak araby)
