= Karinj =

Karinj Քարինջ
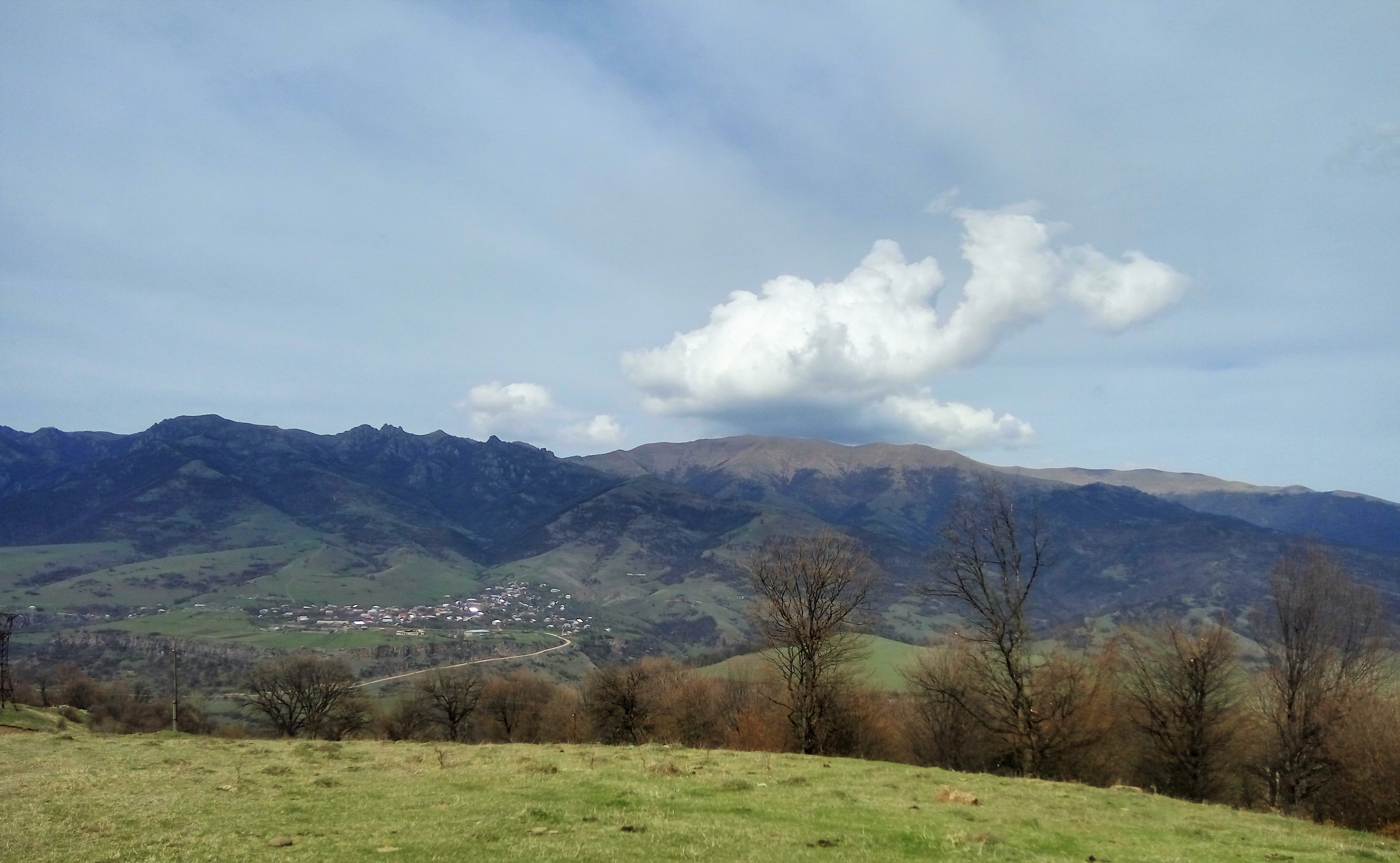

- Location within Armenia
- Coordinates: 40°58′24″N 44°41′19″E
- Country: Armenia
- Marz (Province): Lori
- Elevation: 1,230 m (4,040 ft)

Population (2011)
  - Total: 643
- Time zone: UTC+4 ( )
  - Summer (DST): UTC+5

Karinj (Armenian: Քարինջ) is a village in the Lori Province of Armenia. It belongs to the municipality of Tumanyan.

== Development Programs ==
In 2015 some programs started to be implemented in Karinj by Children of Armenia Fund.

Girls of Armenia Leadership Soccer (GOALS), Student Councils, English Language Instruction, Social and Psychological Assistance, Health and Lifestyle Education, School Nutrition & Brushodromes, Women Health Screenings, Support for Reproductive Health were implemented in the village by COAF.

COAF SMART, cafeteria and brushodrome were renovated in the village school.

== Gallery ==
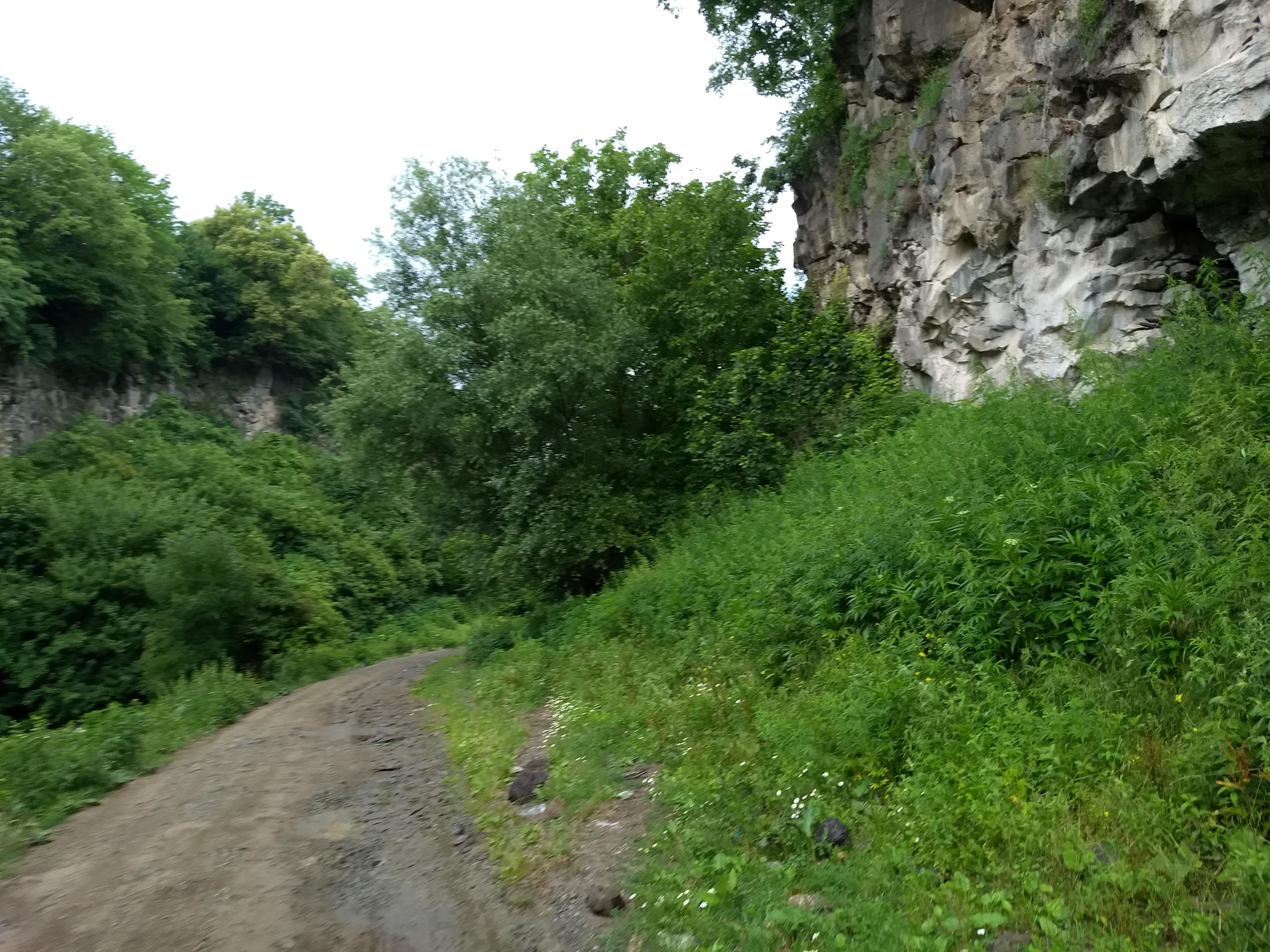
Road in Karinj with small cliffs

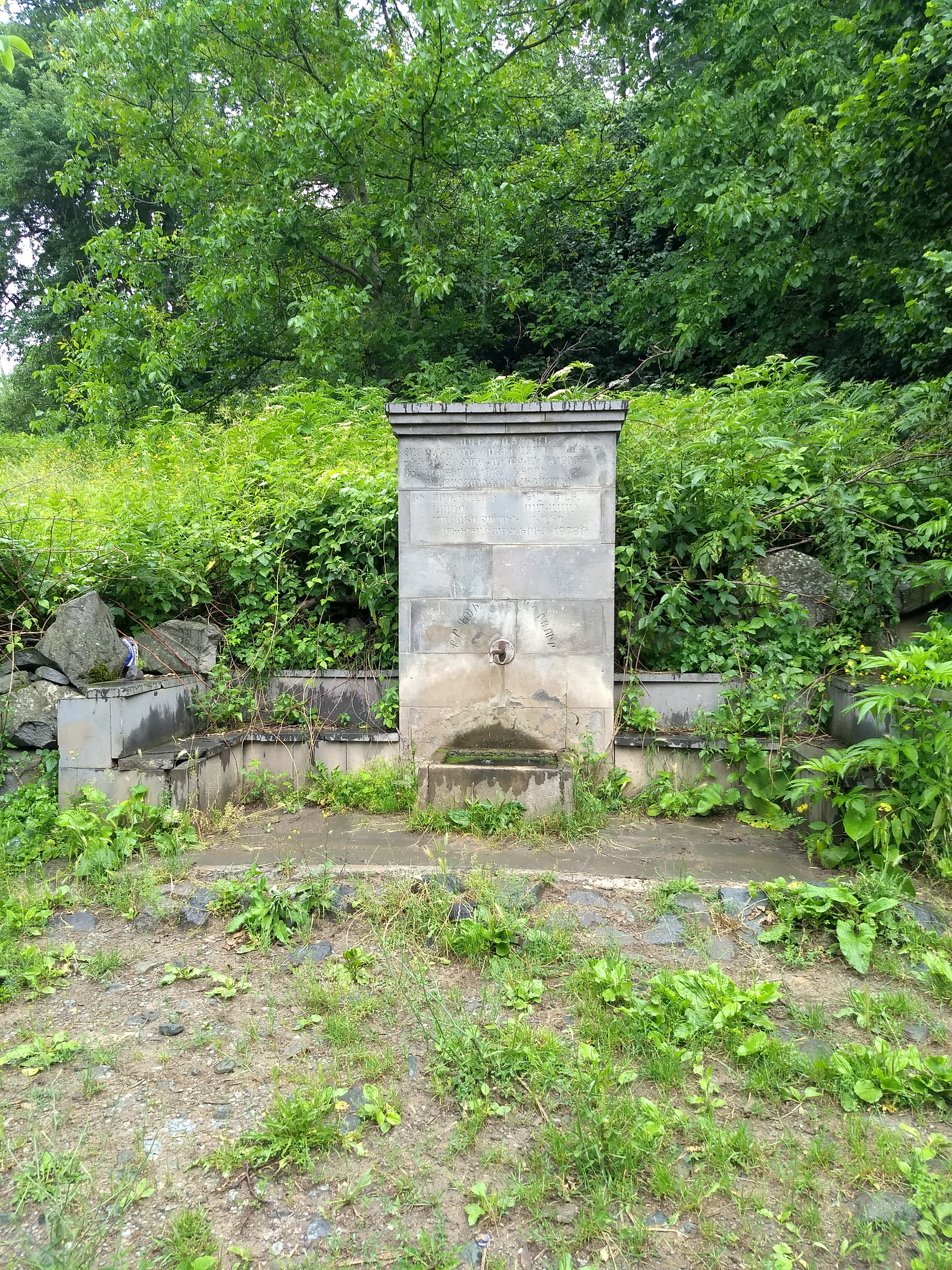
Fountain in Karinj village

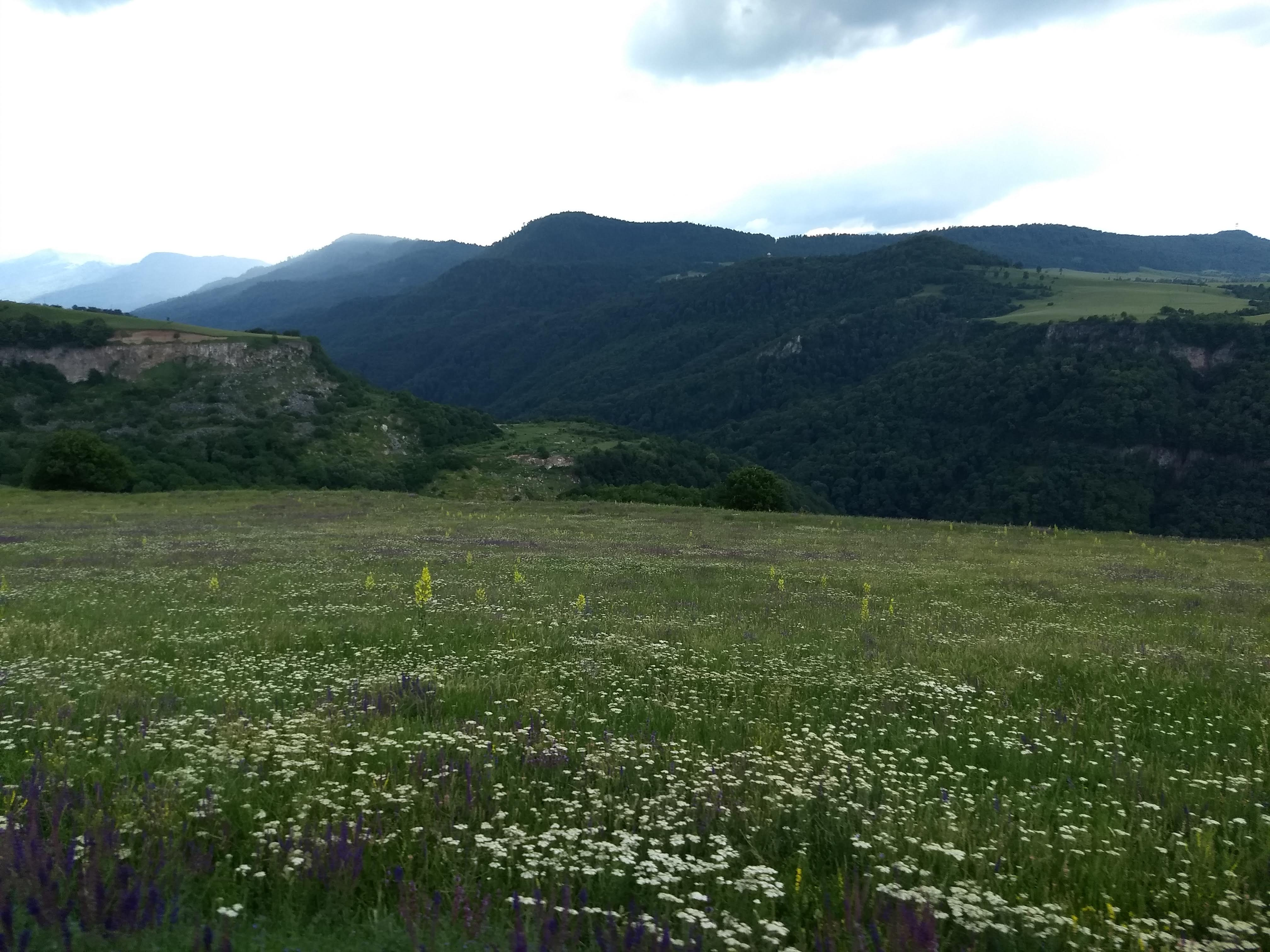
Track from Karinj village to Tumanyan town

== See also ==
- Lori province
- Children of Armenia Fund
