= Atan, Armenia =

Atan Աթան
- Location within Armenia
- Coordinates: 40°56′02″N 44°50′57″E
- Country: Armenia
- Marz (Province): Lori
- Elevation: 1,650 m (5,410 ft)

Population (2011)
  - Total: 281
- Time zone: UTC+4 ( )
  - Summer (DST): UTC+5

Atan (Armenian: Աթան), is a village in the Lori Province of Armenia. It belongs to the municipality of Tumanyan.
