= Shamut =

Shamut Շամուտ
- Location within Armenia
- Coordinates: 40°56′N 44°47′E
- Country: Armenia
- Marz (Province): Lori
- Elevation: 1,500 m (4,900 ft)

Population (2011)
  - Total: 257
- Time zone: UTC+4 ( )
  - Summer (DST): UTC+5

Shamut (Armenian: Շամուտ), is a village in the Lori Province of Armenia. It belongs to the municipality of Tumanyan.

== Notable people ==
- Stepan Sarkisyan, Olympic silver medalist and European champion in Freestyle wrestling
