= Stepan Sarkisyan =

Armenian freestyle wrestler (born 1962)

Personal information
- Born: 15 September 1962 (age 63) Shamut, Armenia
- Height: 1.64 m (5 ft 4 1/2 in)
- Weight: 62 kg (137 lb)

Sport
- Sport: Wrestling
- Event: Freestyle
- Club: Spartak Vanadzor
- Coached by: Hakob Gendzhyana
Medal record
Men's freestyle wrestling
Representing Soviet Union
Olympic Games
Silver medal – second place	1988 Seoul	62 kg
European Championships
Gold medal – first place	1988 Manchester	62 kg
World Cup
Gold medal – first place	1984 Toledo	62 kg
Gold medal – first place	1989 Toledo	62 kg
Goodwill Games
Silver medal – second place	1990 Seattle	62 kg

Stepan Sarkisyan (Armenian: Ստէփան Սարգսյան, born 15 September 1962) is a former Soviet Armenian Freestyle wrestler. He's an Olympic silver medalist and European Champion and was awarded the Honoured Master of Sports of the USSR title in 1988.

== Biography ==
Stepan was born on 15 September 1962 in the village of Shamut, Soviet Armenia. In 1976, his family moved to Vanadzor, where he started freestyle wrestling under teacher Hakob Gendzhyana. In 1981, he won the Junior World Championship.

Sarkisyan joined the USSR national freestyle wrestling team in 1984. That same year, he won a gold medal at the Wrestling World Cup team competition, defeating American Lee Roy Smith in the finals. Sarkisyan had a very successful career year in 1988, first when he became the Soviet Union Champion. Sarkisyan later won a gold medal at the 1988 European Wrestling Championships. As the European Champion, Sarkisyan qualified for participation at the 1988 Summer Olympics in Seoul. Sarkisyan easily and dominantly defeated all of his competition up to the finals, where he faced John Smith, younger brother of Lee Roy. Sarkisyan was unable to defeat Smith. He was awarded the Olympic silver medal.

The next year, Sarkisyan won his second gold medal at the Wrestling World Cup, defeating John Smith in a rematch in the finals, just as he had done to his brother five years ago. Sarkisyan competed at the 1989 World Wrestling Championships, but lost to Smith early in the tournament, resulting in Sarkisyan coming in sixth place. He won a silver medal in the 1990 Goodwill Games in Seattle. Sarkisyan left the Soviet national team in 1990 and, in 1991, he completed his wrestling career. He later worked as a sports official in now independent Armenia.

A freestyle wrestling international tournament dedicated to Stepan Sarkisyan takes place in Sarkisyan's hometown of Vanadzor, Armenia as of 1996. Wrestlers from Armenia, Russia, Georgia, Ukraine and Iran are invited to compete. Sarkisyan was president of the Wrestling Federation of Armenia from 1998 to 2002, and in 2002, was made the honorary president.
