= Marts, Armenia =

Marts Մարց
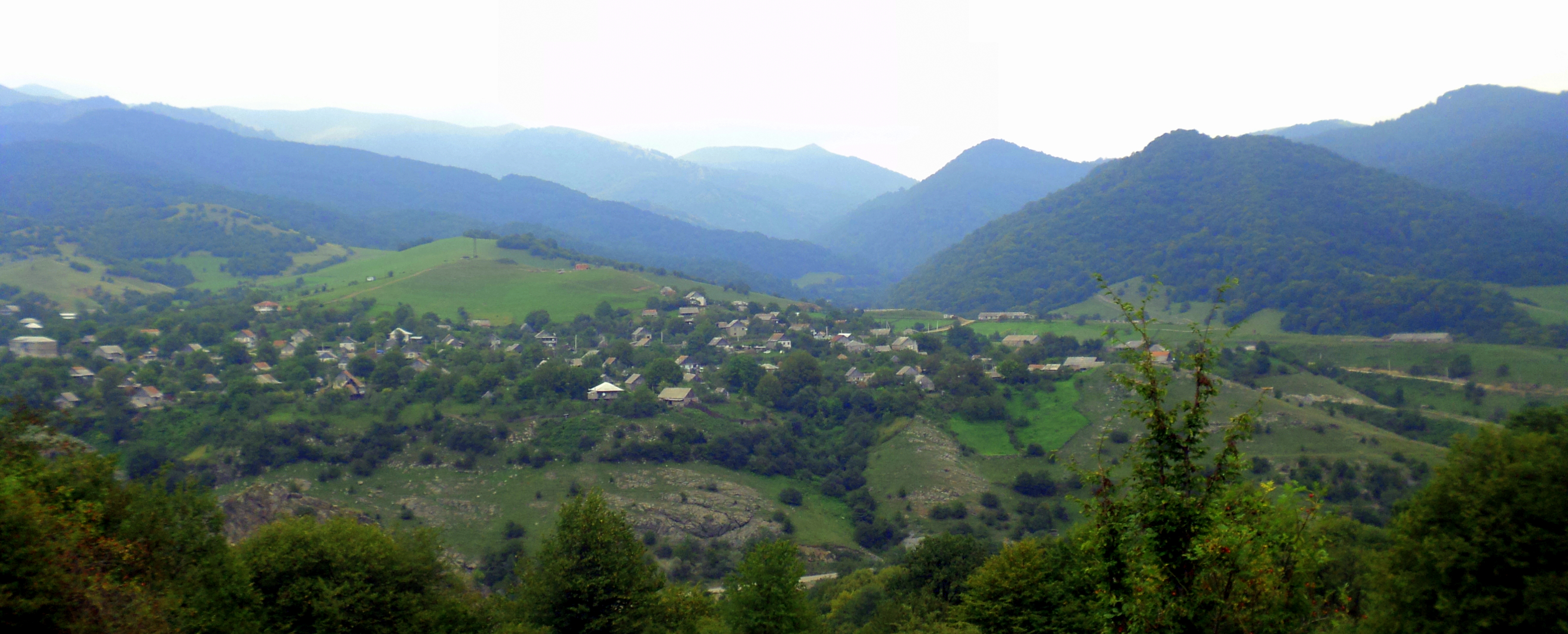
- Marts

- Location within Armenia
- Coordinates: 40°57′25″N 44°42′16″E
- Country: Armenia
- Marz (Province): Lori
- Elevation: 1,050 m (3,440 ft)

Population (2011)
  - Total: 496
- Time zone: UTC+4 ( )
  - Summer (DST): UTC+5

Marts (Armenian: Մարց), is a village in the Lori Province of Armenia. It belongs to the municipality of Tumanyan.
