= Bardzrakash Monastery =

Armenian monastery

Bardzrakash monastery Բարձրաքաշ
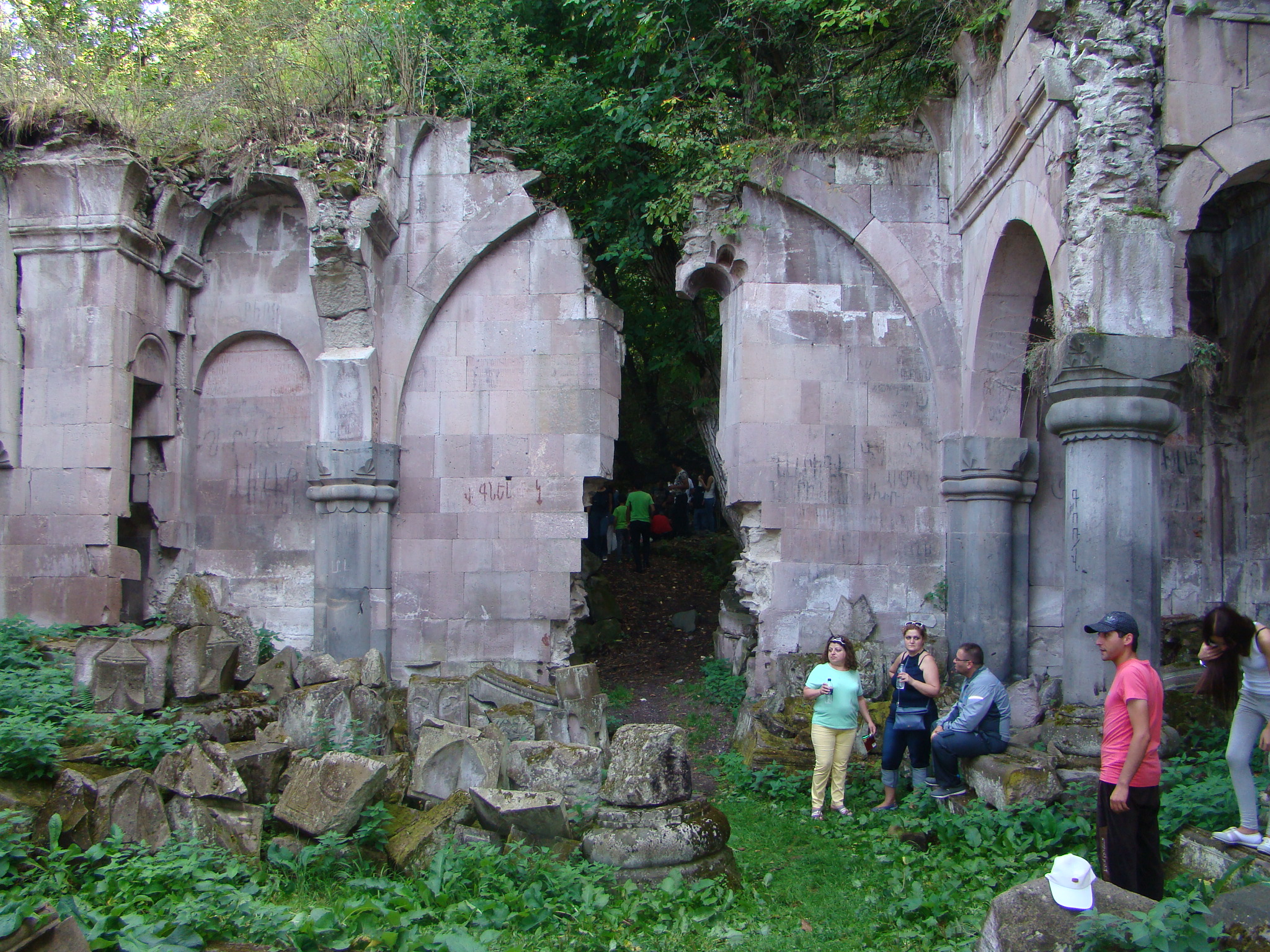

- Location within Armenia

Religion
- Affiliation: Armenian Apostolic Church

Location
- Location: near Tumanyan, Lori Province, Armenia
- Coordinates: 40.977914°N 44.65902°E

Architecture
- Style: Armenian

Bardzrakash (Armenian: Բարձրաքաշ) is a 10th-13th century Armenian monastery located between Dsegh village and Tumanyan town within Lori marz, Armenia. It is built on a flat spot on a steep slope below cliffs, and above the Marts river, in the Tavut forest.

The complex consists of two churches, a vestibule, a chapel, the ancestral cemetery of Mamikonyan and remainders of khachkars. The two churches and the vestibule that make the main group are placed near to each other in one line. The preserved oldest construction, built of rough-hewn smaller basalt stones is the one-nave hall type church at the north of the complex, of which only a 3-4m high wall remains. Although no details have reached us about the history of this church, from the construction methods it is thought to have been built in the 10th century. The building in the center is the 13th century Holy Astvatsatsin - the main church, of which the entrance, parts of the southern and western walls, sections of flying arches, and pillars are still well preserved. Holy Astvatsatsin and its gavit are both constructed of large, finely cut slabs of felsite stone. The monastery does not appear to have functioned for long after the construction of Holy Astvatsatsin, as the last of the inscriptions on the church walls date to the mid-13th century.

Bardzrakash underwent some type of renovations in 1939, and some cleanup efforts in 1950 and 1969. It was listed on the 2014 World Monuments Fund as one of 67 cultural heritage sites at risk from the forces of nature and the impact of social, political, and economic change

== Gallery ==
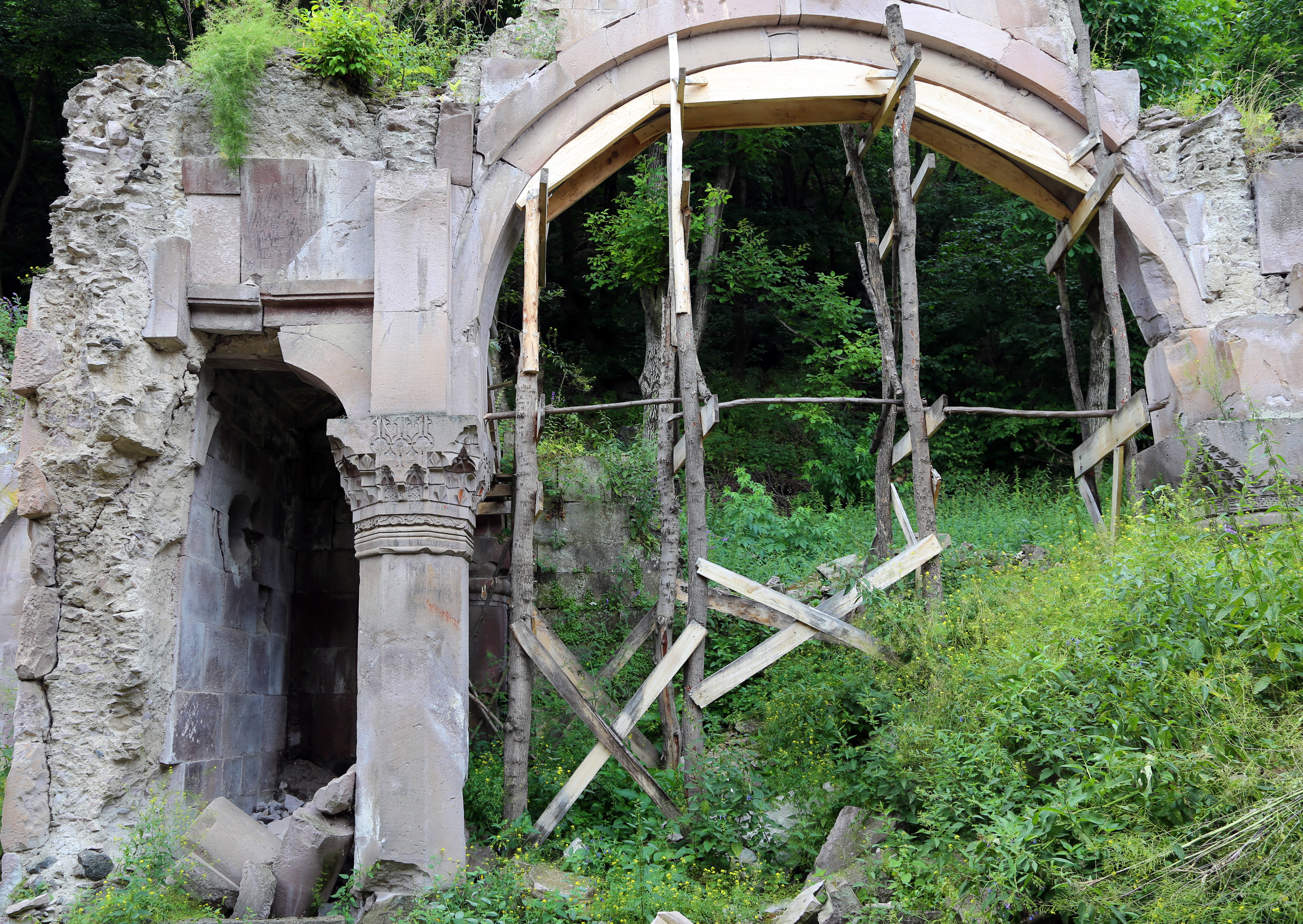

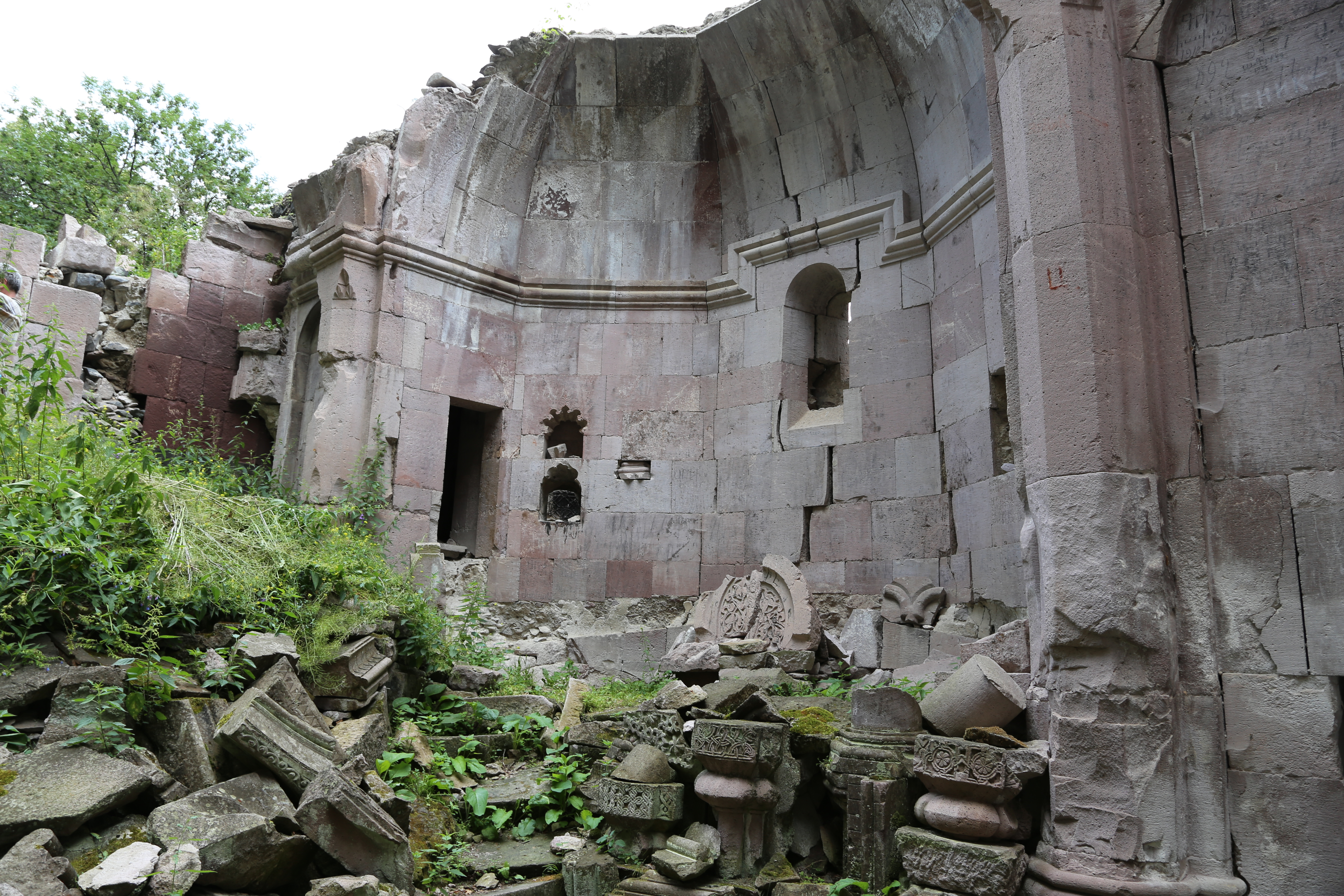

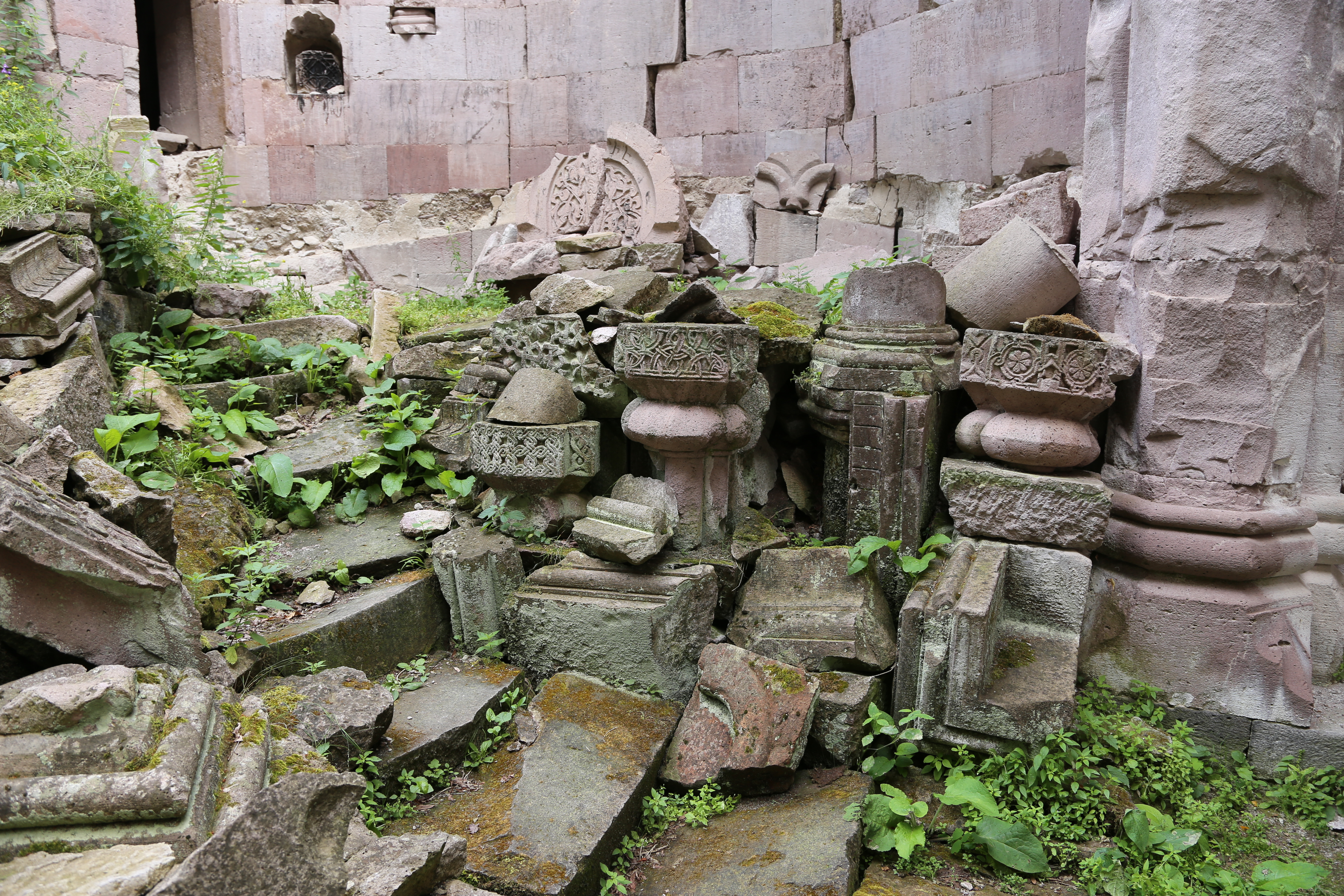

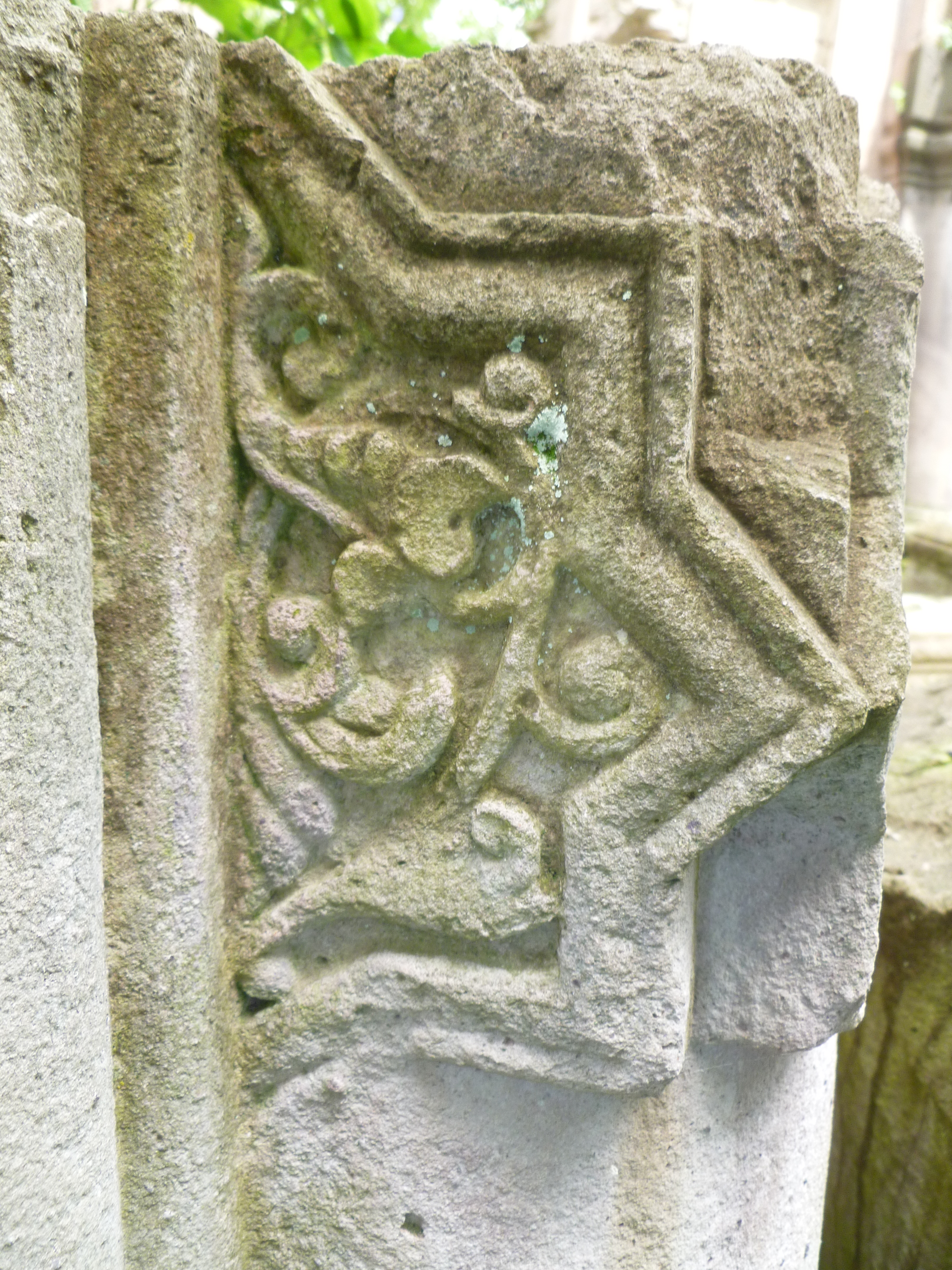

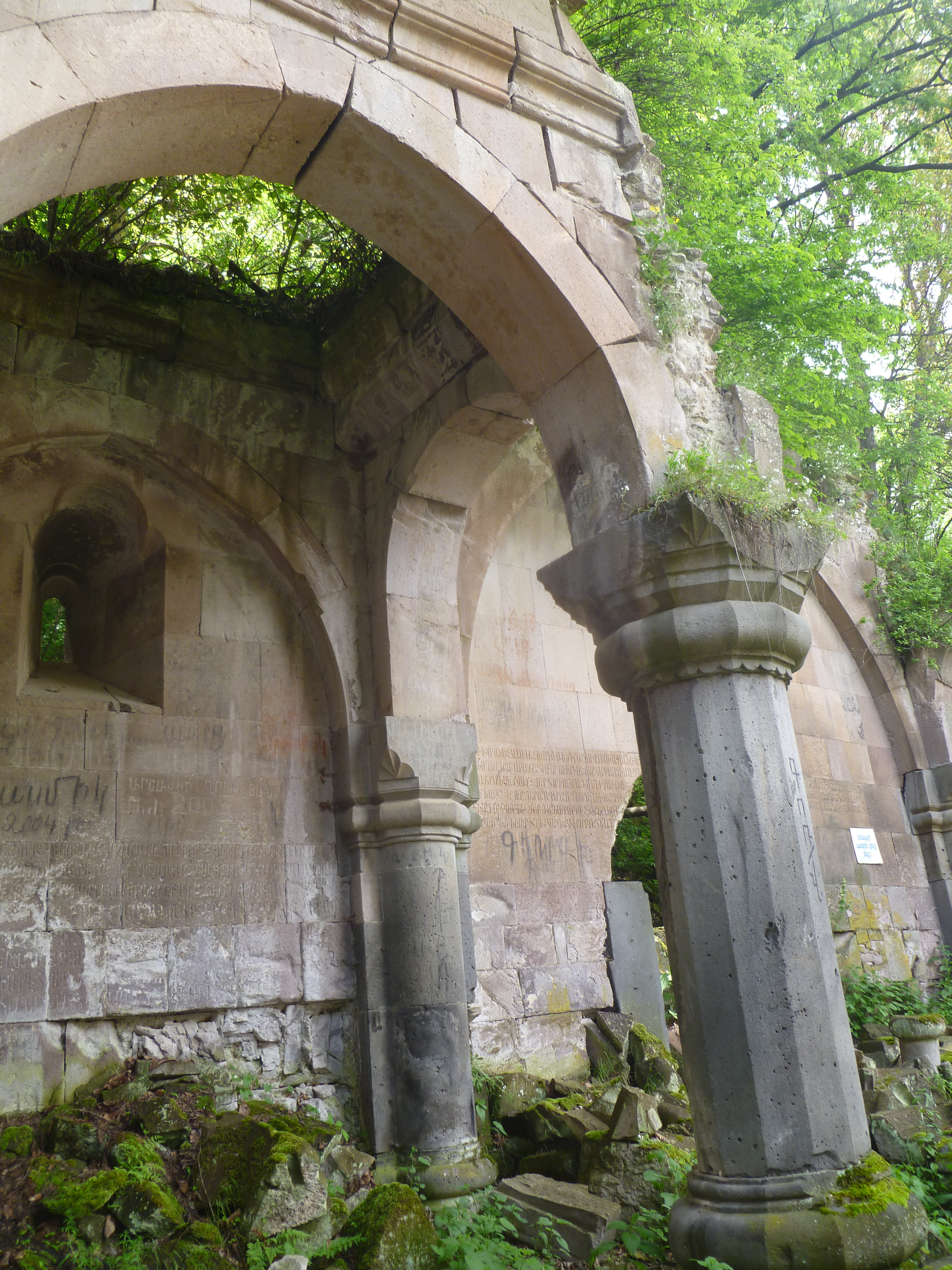

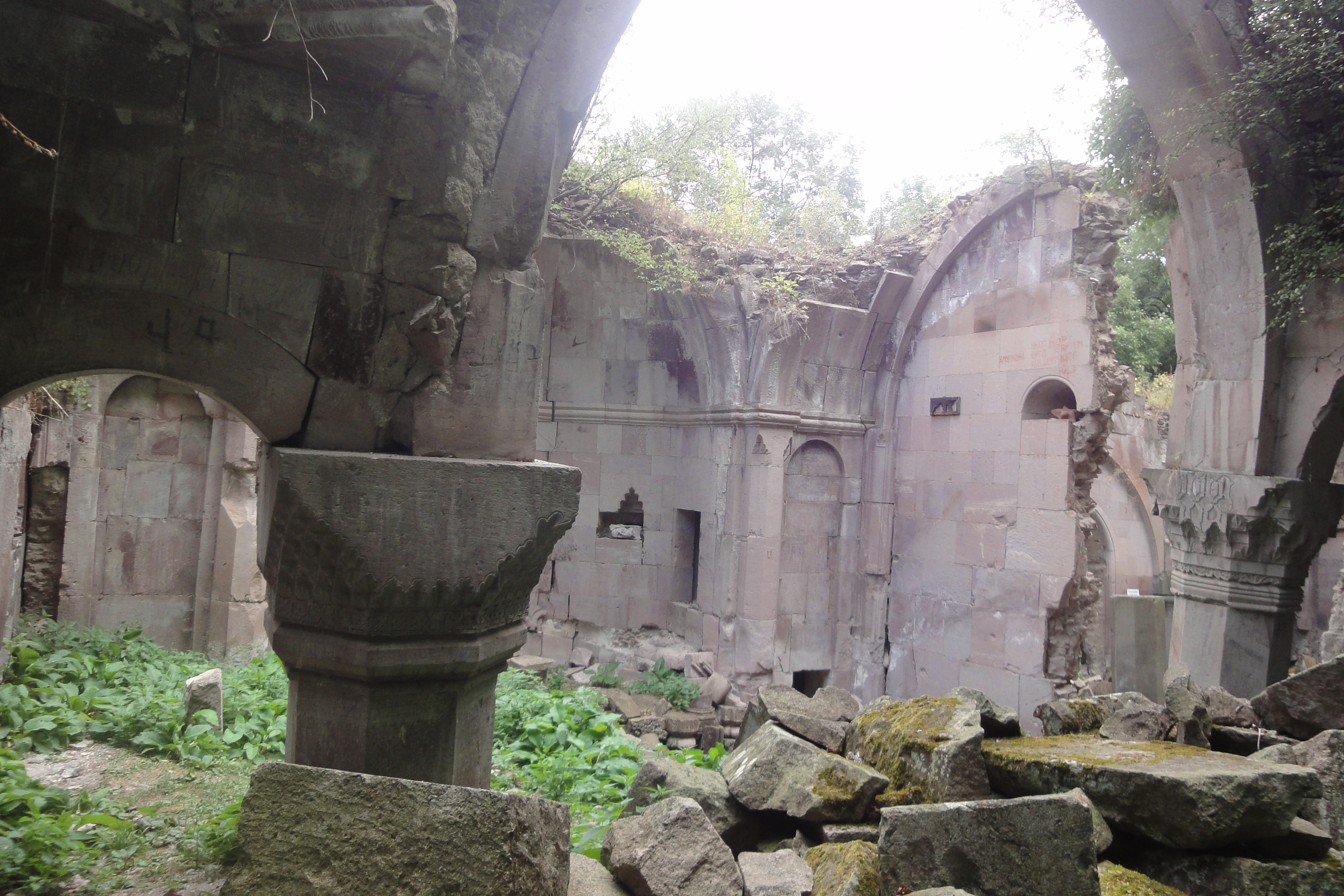

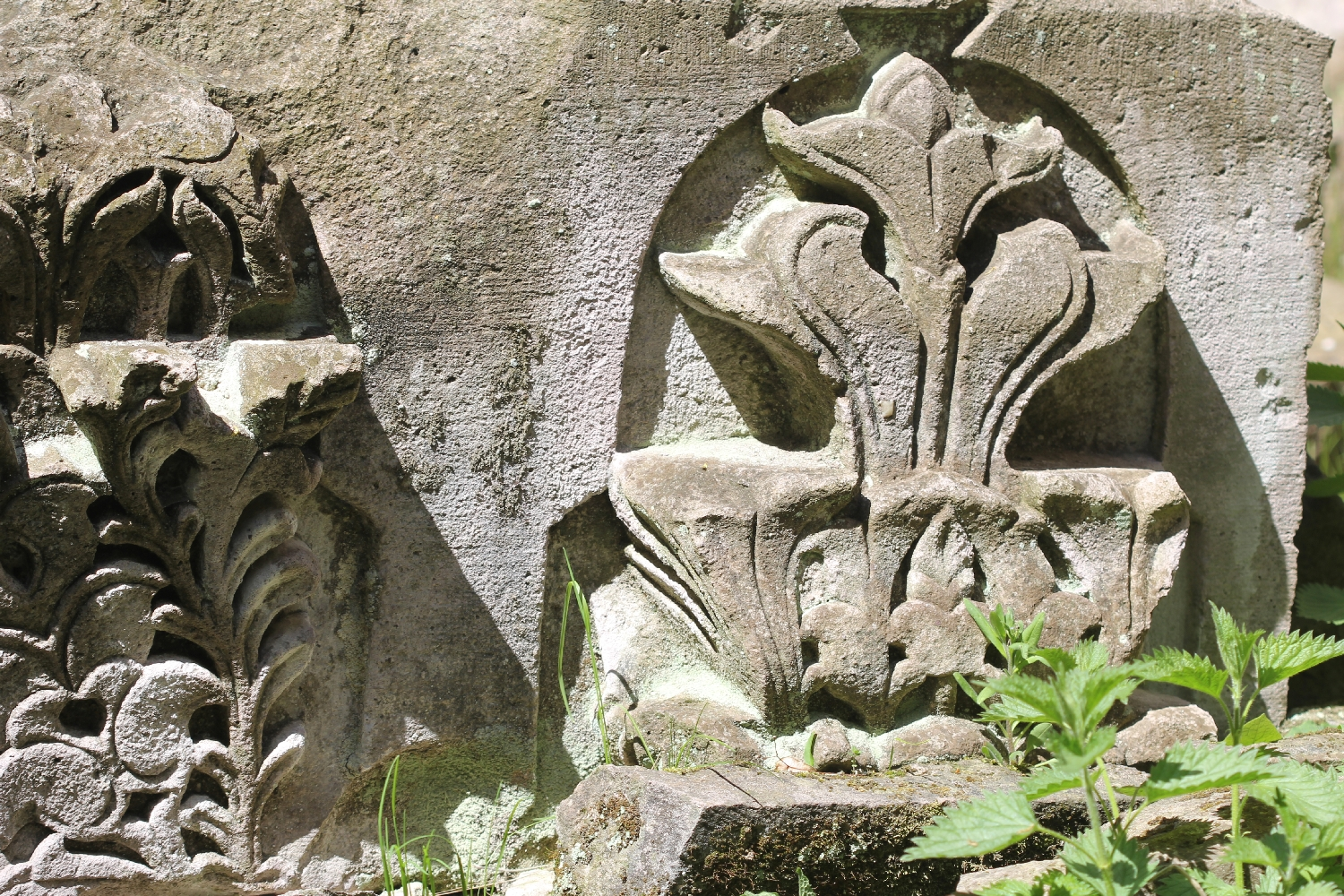

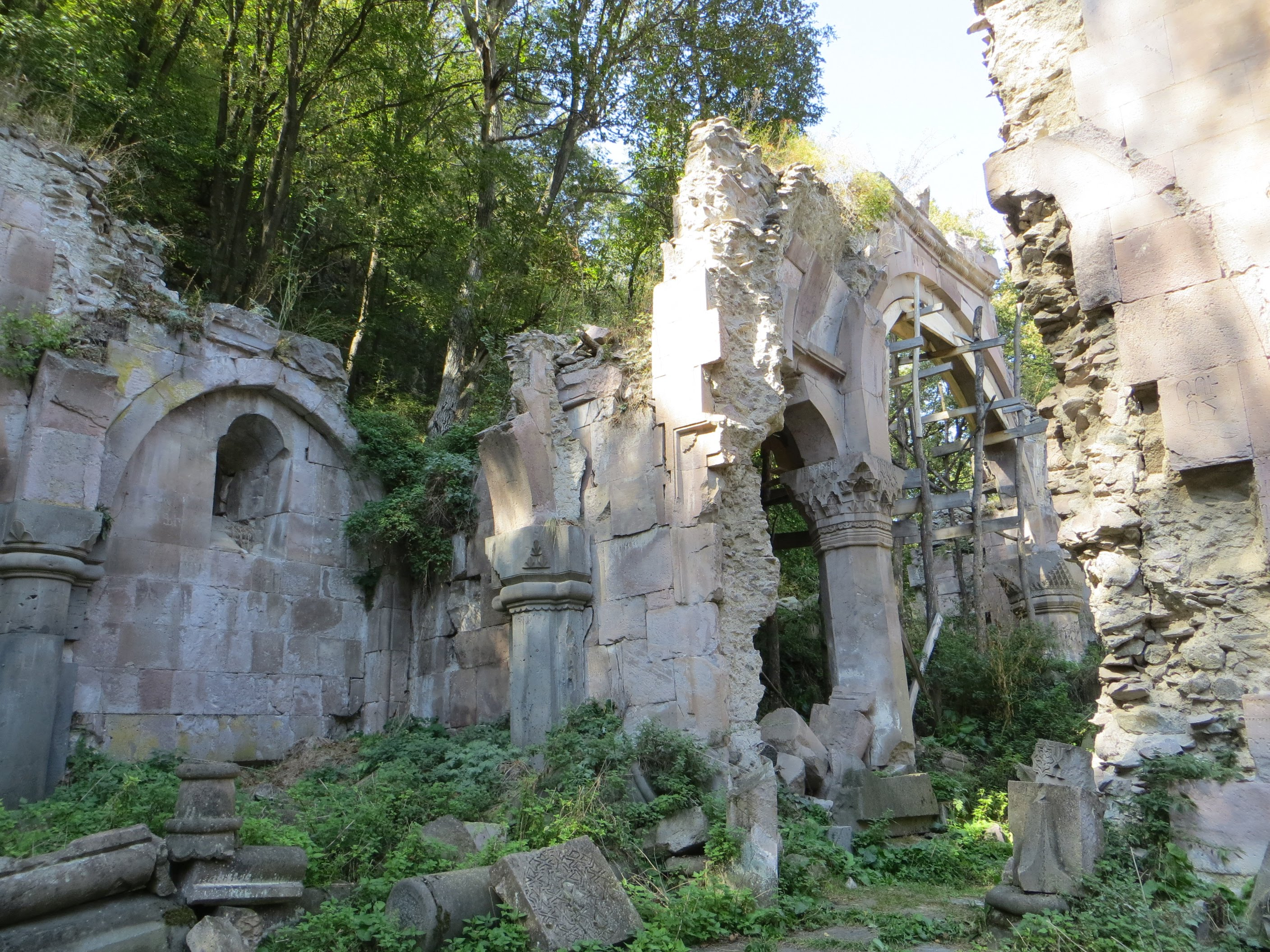
