= Ahnidzor =

Ahnidzor Ահնիձոր
- Location within Armenia
- Coordinates: 40°54′36″N 44°49′17″E
- Country: Armenia
- Marz (Province): Lori
- Elevation: 1,500 m (4,900 ft)

Population (2018)
  - Total: 180
- Time zone: UTC+4 ( )

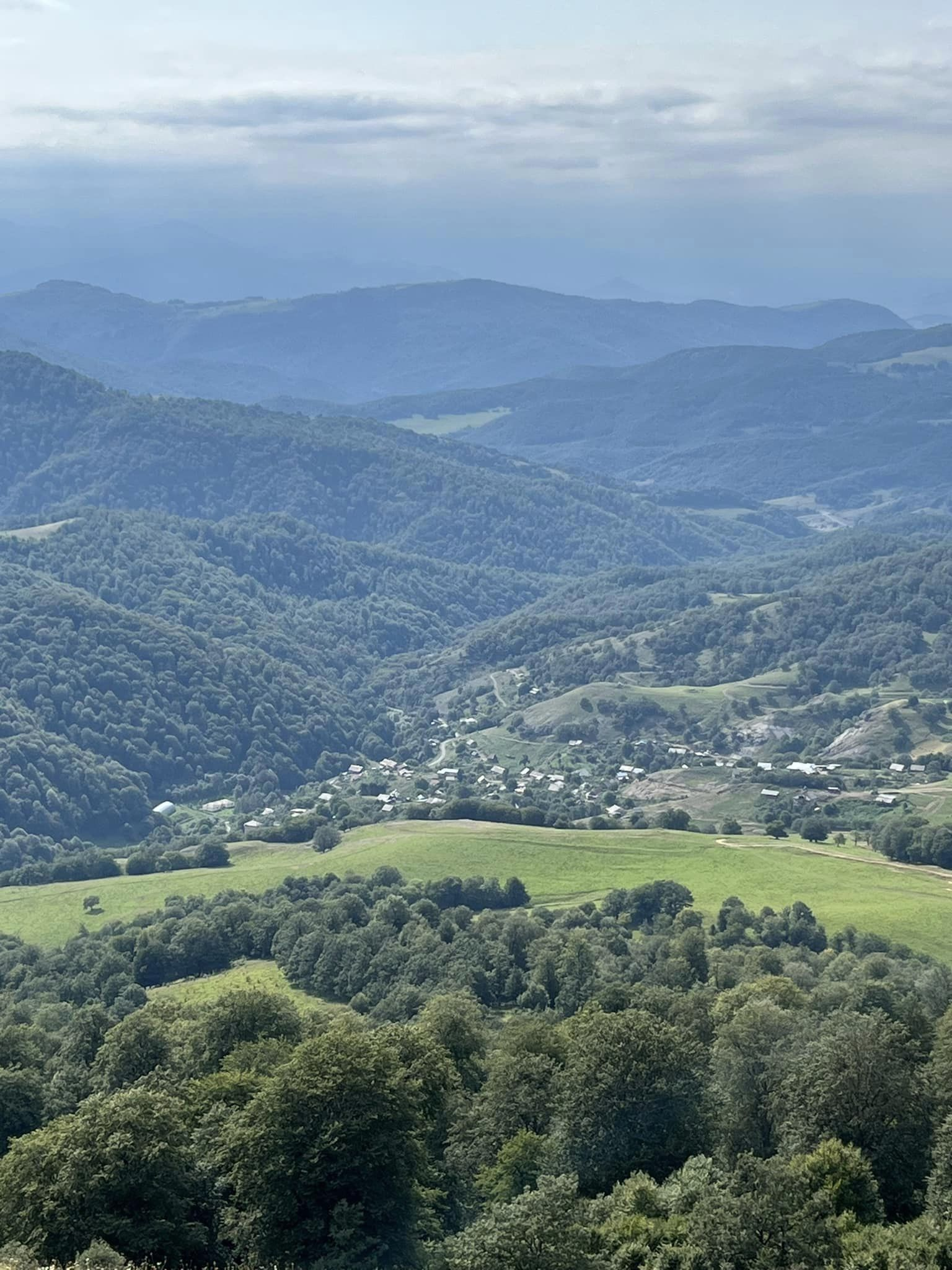
Ahnidzor village

Ahnidzor (Armenian: Ահնիձոր), is a village in the Lori Province of Armenia. It belongs to the municipality of Tumanyan. The village is best known as the birthplace of writer Hrant Matevosyan. It has a wonderful nature surrounded by mountains and forests.
