= Tumanyan, Armenia =

City in Lori, Armenia

Tumanyan Թումանյան
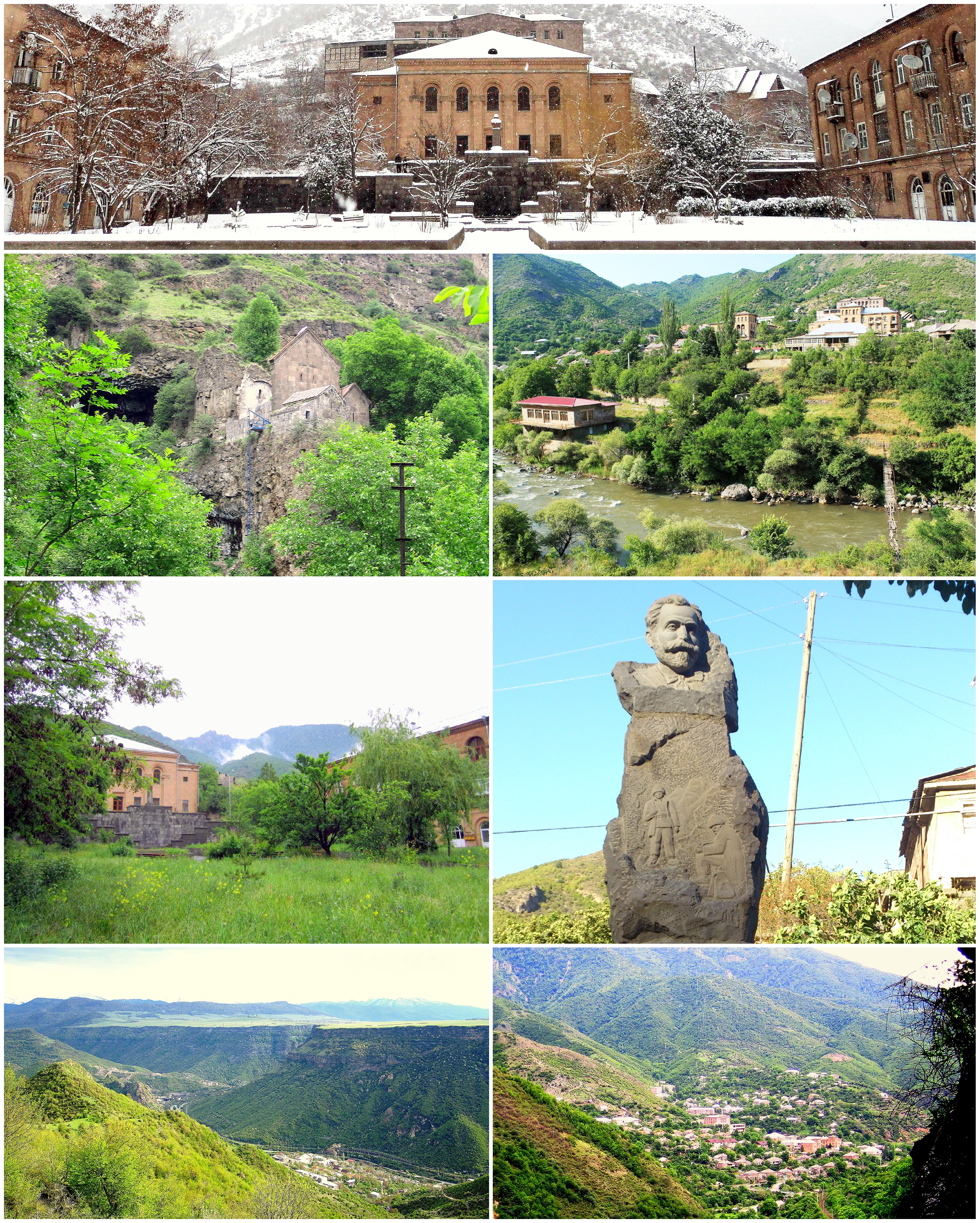
- From top left: Tumanyan Central square Kobayr monastery • Debed River; House of culture • Statue of Hovhannes Tumanyan; Debed River gorge • Tumanyan landscape

- Location within Armenia
- Coordinates: 40°59′12″N 44°39′21″E
- Country: Armenia
- Province: Lori
- Founded: 1926

Government
  - Mayor: Levon Zavaryan

Area
  - Total: 1 km^{2} (0.39 sq mi)
- Elevation: 810 m (2,660 ft)

Population (2022)
  - Total: 1,414
  - Density: 1,400/km^{2} (3,700/sq mi)
- Time zone: UTC+4 (AMT)
- Website: Official website

Tumanyan (Armenian: Թումանյան), is a town and urban municipal community in Armenia's northern Lori Province, on the banks of the Debed River and in the middle of the Debed Canyon. It's 149 km (93 mi) north of the capital Yerevan, and 131 km (81 mi) from Tbilisi. The nearby villages of Kober kayaran, Shamut, Lorut, Ahnidzor, Atan, Marts and Karinj are also part of the Tumanyan community.

== Etymology ==
At its foundation in 1926, the town was known as Dzaghidzor (Armenian: Ձաղիձոր). However, it was renamed Tumanyan on July 4, 1951, in honour of the famous Armenian poet Hovhannes Tumanyan.

== History ==
Historically, the area of modern-day Tumanyan was included in the Dzorapor (Armenian: Ձորափոր) canton of the historic Gugark province, the 13th province of Greater Armenia. Prior to the foundation of the Republic of Armenia in 1918, the area was part of the Borchali uyezd of Tiflis Governorate, within the Russian Empire. In late 1918, Armenia and Georgia fought a border war over the region of Lori. In January 1919, the Lori neutral zone was established by the British forces. Following Armenia's Sovietization in December 1920, Lori was finally incorporated into Soviet Armenia on 11 February 1921.

In 1926, the village of Dzaghidzor was founded on the right bank of Debed river. In 1930, it was included within the newly founded Tumanyan raion. In 1934, refractory metals mines were found 3.5 km (2.2 mi) north of Dzaghidzor village. The production of fireproof materials extracted from the mines of Dzaghidzor was launched in 1939.

With the rapid growth of the village, Dzaghidzor was granted the status of an urban-type settlement in 1947 and it was about this time when architect Sos Manukyan designed the modern layout of the central part of Tumanyan, with a town square, parks, school, house of culture and other public spaces. In 1951, the settlement was renamed Tumanyan. During the 1950s, the Kober railway station was opened on the left bank of Debed river, around 1 km (0.62 mi) northwest of Tumanyan, to serve the Tumanyan fireproof materials factory opened in 1951.

In 1995, the government of independent Armenia reaffirmed the status of Tumanyan as an urban settlement within the Lori Province. Besides the town of Tumanyan, the nearby villages of Atan, Shamut, Karinj, Lorut, Marts, Kober kayaran and Ahnidzor are also under the jurisdiction of the municipality of Tumanyan.

== Geography ==
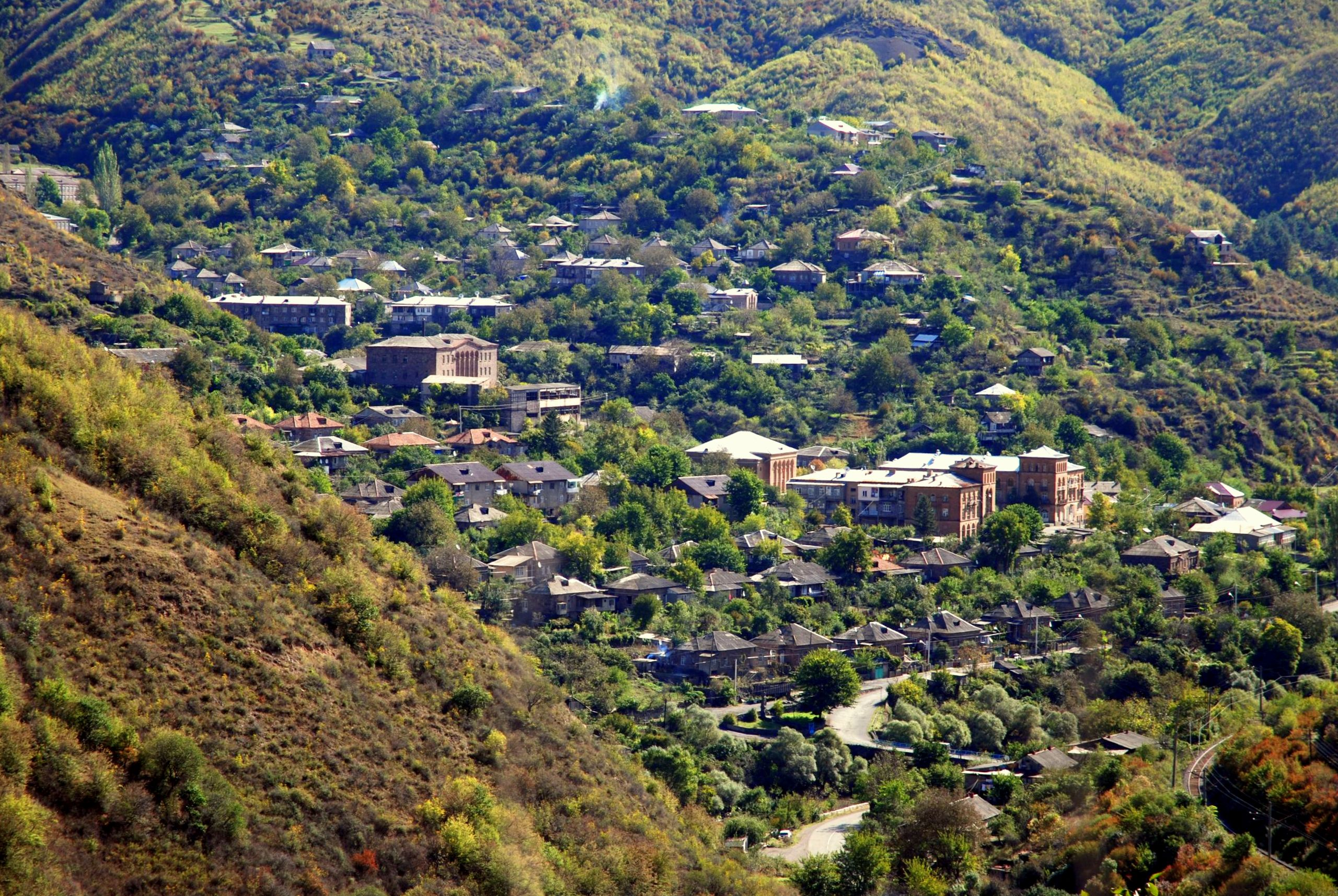
General view

Tumanyan is situated on a plateau on the right bank of Debed river at a height of 810 meters above sea level. It occupies an area of around 1 km².

Tumanyan is characterized with a subtropical climate. The weather is relatively hot during the summer season and mildly cold during winter.

The annual precipitation level ranges between 500 and 600 mm (20 and 24 in).

== Demographics ==
The residents of Tumanyan are mainly Armenians, most of whom belong to the Armenian Apostolic Church, as well as mainly Russian artists who moved to Tumanyan after the Russian invasion of Ukraine. The population of Tumanyan reached its peak during the 1960s when the town reached 2,864 in 1964. However, the population has been declining since the 1970s, due to the rapid downfall in the economy of the region. As of the 2011 census, the population of Tumanyan was 1,710. Currently, the town has an approximate population of 1,414 as per the 2021 census.

Here is the population timeline since the foundation of Tumanyan in 1926:

Year	1926	1959	1964	1980	2001	2011	2022
Population	42	2640	2864	1881	1909	1710	1414

== Culture ==
The 12th-century Armenian Monastery of Kobayr is located at the northern outskirts of Tumanyan. Many kahchkars (cross-stones) are also found in the town, dating back to the 9th, 13th and 14th centuries. A ruined fortress known as Avanakar dating back to the 14th century is found at the southern outskirts of the town. Just south of Tumanyan is the semi-ruined Bardzrakash Monastery, only accessible by foot.

Currently, Tumanyan is served by a cultural palace located above the central square, a public library, the Tumanyan Matchbox Label Museum and an art academy. The statue of poet Hovhannes Tumanyan is found at the northwestern entrance to the town.

The town of is home to 2 public education schools as well as a pre-school kindergarten.

== Transportation ==
Tumanyan is located on the on M-6 Motorway that connects Yerevan with Tbilisi via Vanadzor.

The Kober railway station operating since the 1950s is located on the left bank of Debed river, around 1 km (0.62 mi) northwest of Tumanyan.

== Economy ==
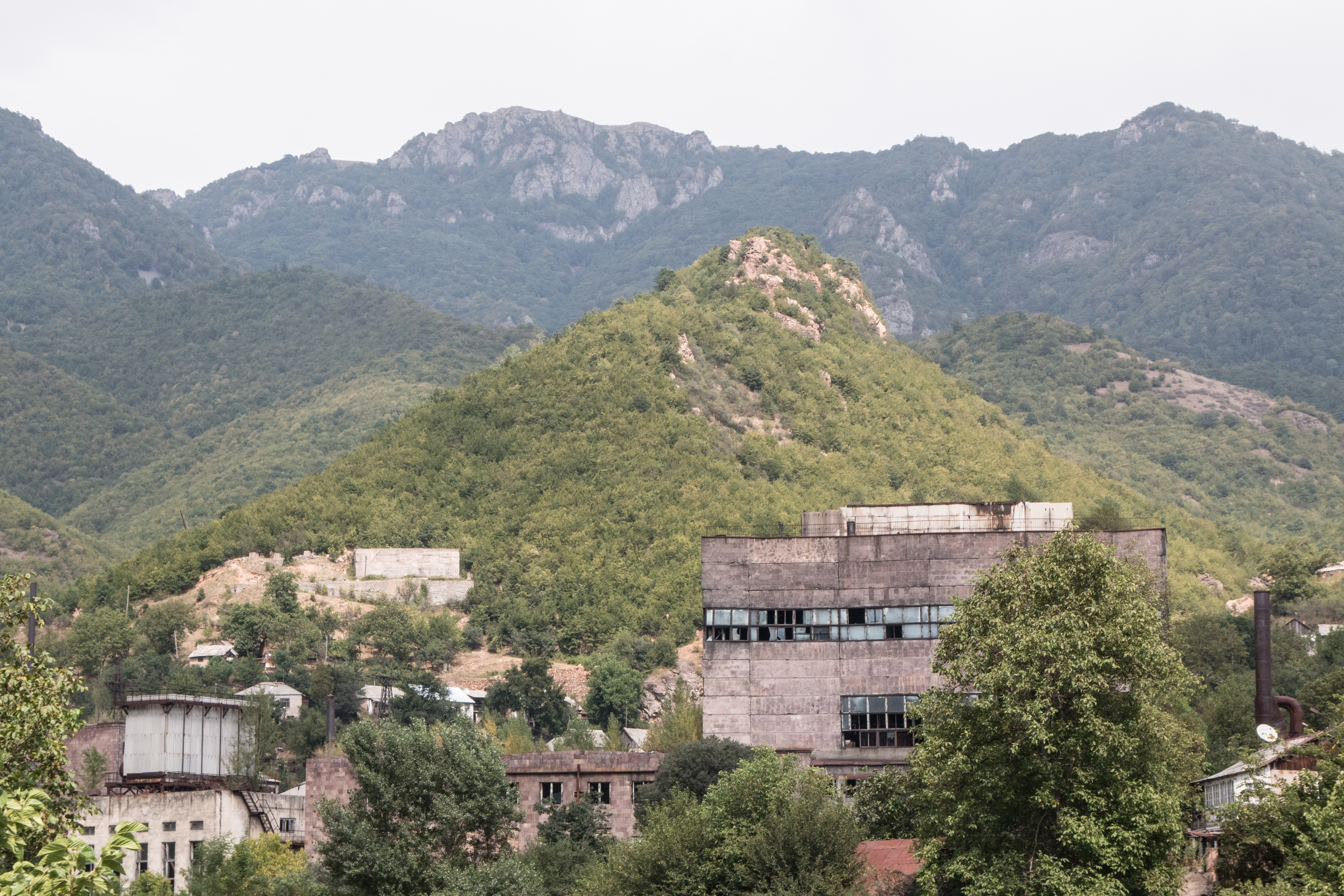
Tumanyan fireproof materials factory

The growth of the town during the 1950s was mainly based on the establishment of Tumanyan fireproof materials factory in 1951. It was founded on the basis of the nearby refractory metals mines. However, after the dissolution of the Soviet Union, the production of the plant was significantly dropped.

Currently, the population of the town are mainly involved in tourism. agriculture and cattle-breeding. The town is a jump-off point for river rafting and many hiking trails, hosts the Tumanyan Matchbox Label Museum, and has homestays and a hostel. It is also home to Abastan, an international artists colony in an old factory building. At the end of the summer, Tumanyan is home to the Tumanyan International Storytelling Festival.

In 2015 Tumanyan community welcomed Children of Armenia Fund with its programs: Girls of Armenia Leadership Soccer (GOALS), Student Councils, Debate Clubs, English Language Instruction, Social and Psychological Assistance, Health and Lifestyle Education, School Nutrition & Brushodromes, Women Health Screenings Support for Reproductive Health.

Creativity Lab, Cafeteria and Brushodrome, SMART Room were created and renovated in the community by COAF.

== Sport ==
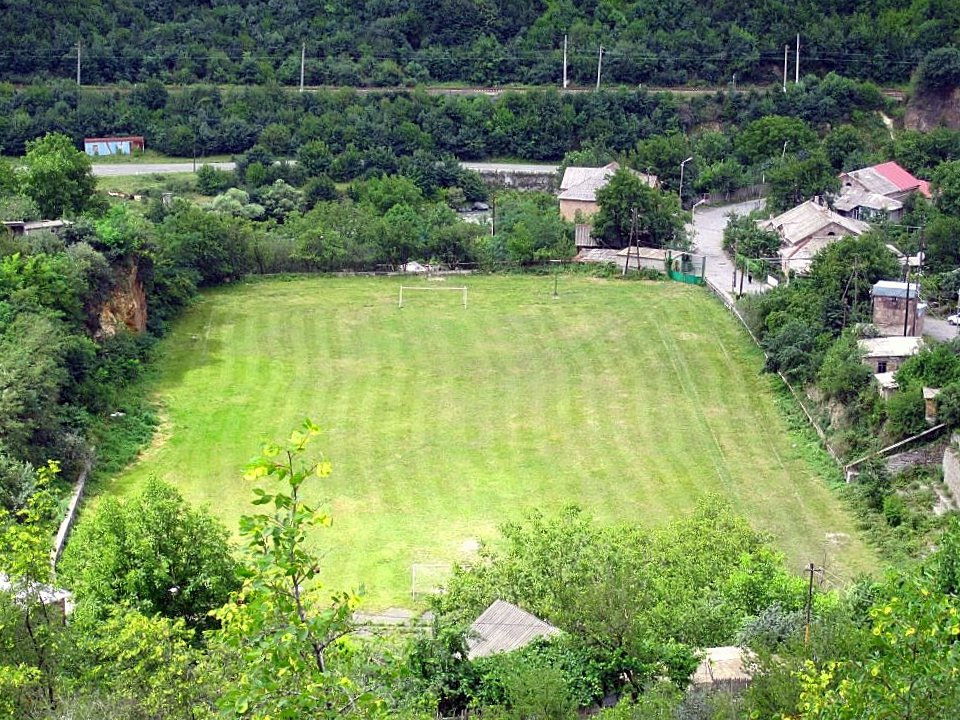
Tumanyan football field

Football is among the most popular sport in Tumanyan. There is a football training field at the centre of the town.

Other popular sports in Tumanyan include martial arts, wrestling and chess.

== See also ==
- Hovhannes Tumanyan
- Children of Armenia Fund
