= Hrant Matevosyan =

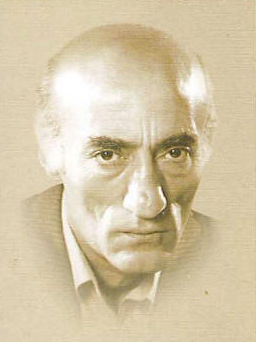
Matevosyan on a postal card

Hrant Ignati Matevosyan (Armenian: Հրանտ Իգնատի Մաթևոսյան, 12 February 1935 – 19 December 2002) was an Armenian writer and screenwriter. By the time of his death he was considered Armenia's "most prominent and accomplished contemporary novelist".

== Biography ==
Hrant Matevosyan was born in 1935 in the village of Ahnidzor, now located in Armenia's Lori Province. He studied in the village school then continued his education at the Pedagogical University of Kirovakan (now Vanadzor). In 1952 he moved to Yerevan where he worked at a printing house. From 1958 until 1962, Matevosyan was a proofreader for the magazine Sovetakan Grakanutyun ("Soviet Literature") and the newspaper Grakan Tert ("Literary Newspaper").

Matevosyan started his literary career in 1961 with an essay "Ahnidzor," which was an expression of a new outlook in literature and was not appreciated at first. His first story collection Ogostos (August) was published in 1967. Matevosyan became acclaimed as one of the pioneers of Armenian modern rural prose. He headed the Writers' Union of Armenia from 1995 until 2000. His literary pieces have been translated into around 40 languages, including Russian, English, French, German, Lithuanian, Estonian, and Georgian.

Matevosyan died of cancer on 12 December 2002 at the age of 67. He is buried at Komitas Pantheon which is located in the city center of Yerevan. He had two children, a son and a daughter.

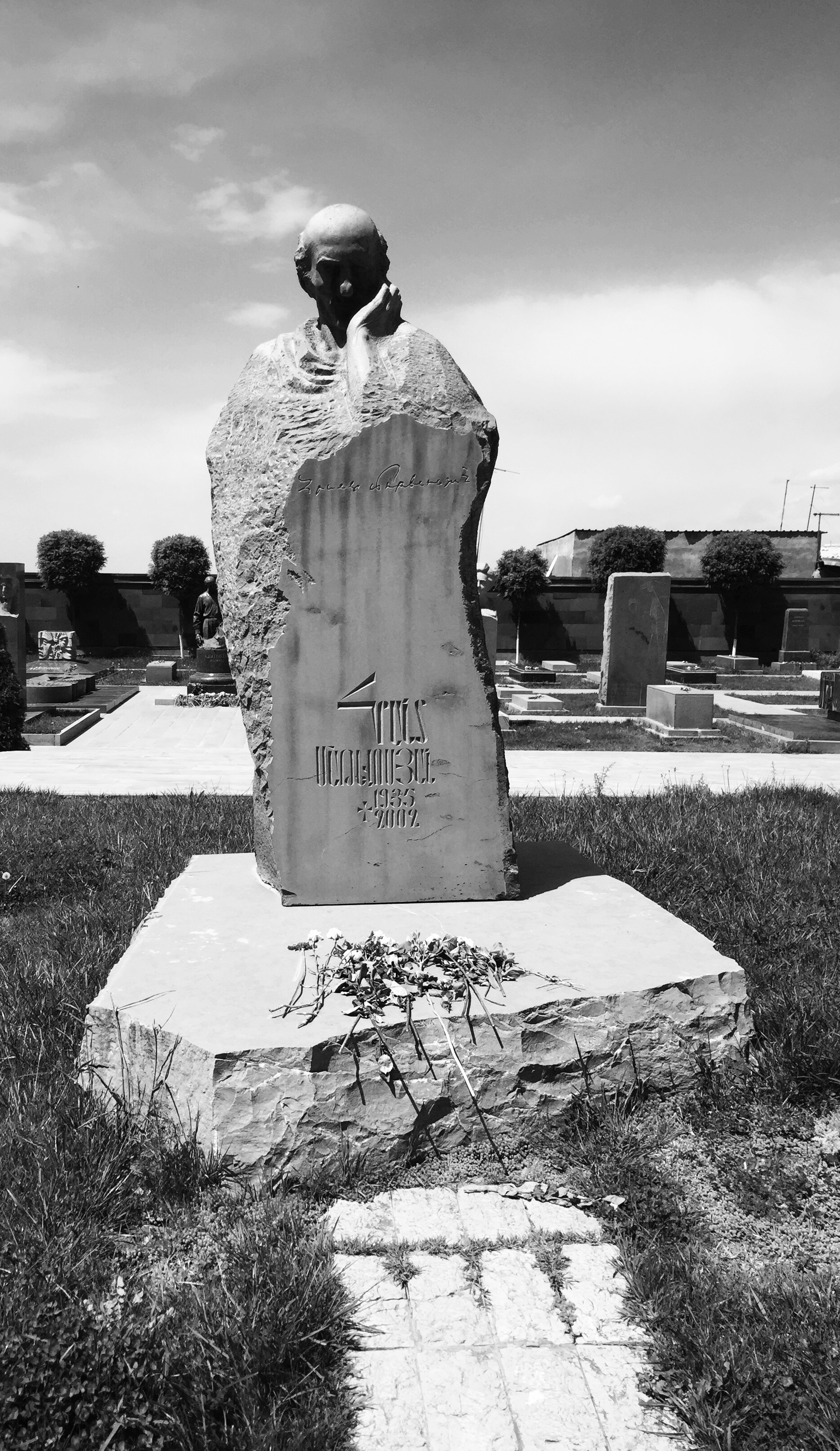
Hrant Matevosyan's tomb at Yerevan's Komitas Pantheon

== Education ==
- Kirovakan Pedagogical University
- 1958–1962 — Yerevan State Pedagogical Institute, Department of History and Linguistics
- 1966–1967 — Moscow Higher Course on Scriptwriting

== Awards ==
- 1967 — "Дружба народов" (Friendship of Nations) magazine award
- 1984 — USSR State Literature Award
- 1984 — USSR State Literature Award
- 1996 — Knight of RA Mesrop Mashtots order

== Works ==
Stories
- 1967 — August
- 1967 — Orange Pony
- 1967 — Mesrop
- 1968 — Buffalo
- 1987 - Trees

Articles and essays

- Metsamor
- In Front of White Paper
- It's Me

Film scripts and plays

- 1969 — We and Our Mountains (film)
- 1969 — The Poor's Honour (film)
- 1975 — This Green, Red World (film)
- 1977 — Autumn Sun (film)
- 1977 — August
- 1979 — Aramayis Yerznkyan (film)
- 1983 - Neutral Zone (play)
- 1984 — The Master (film)
- 1992 — National Army (film)

Short stories

- 1962 — We and Our Mountains (short story)
- 1974 — Carriage Horses
- 1982 - Tashkent
- 1973 — Autumn Sun
- The Master
- Along the Edge (incomplete)
- Buffalo
- The Country's Nerve
- Princess Nana's Bridge

Statues

On September 12, 2013 a statue of Hrant Matevosyan, created by Artashes Hovsepyan, an honored artist of RA, sculptor, was installed in the yard of the school named after Hrant Matevosyan.
