= Khoronk, Lori =

Khoronk
- Location within Armenia
- Coordinates: 40°56′07″N 44°45′49″E
- Country: Armenia
- Marz (Province): Lori
- Time zone: UTC+4 ( )
  - Summer (DST): UTC+5 ( )

Khoronk (also, Khoronk’) is a town in the Lori Province of Armenia.
