= Kachagan =

Kachagan may refer to:

- Arevatsag, Armenia
- Lernavan, Armenia
