= Lernavan =

Lernavan Լեռնավան
- Location within Armenia
- Coordinates: 40°47′18″N 44°11′04″E
- Country: Armenia
- Marz (Province): Lori Province
- Elevation: 1,775 m (5,823 ft)

Population (2011)
  - Total: 1,363
- Time zone: UTC+4 ( )
  - Summer (DST): UTC+5 ( )

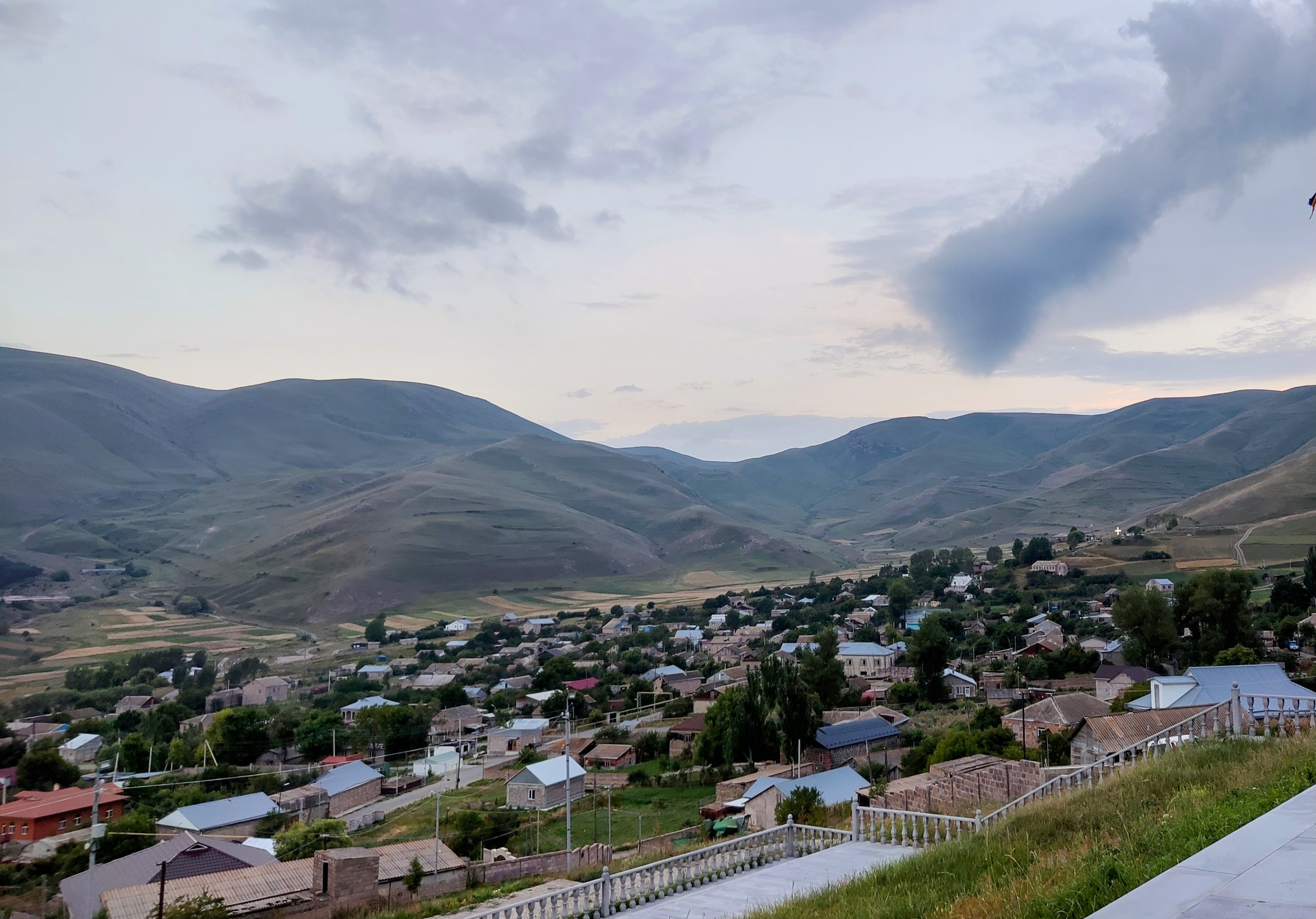
Lernavan

Lernavan (Armenian: Լեռնավան; formerly, Kachagan) is a town in the Lori Province of Armenia.
