= Arevatsag =

Arevatsag Արևածագ
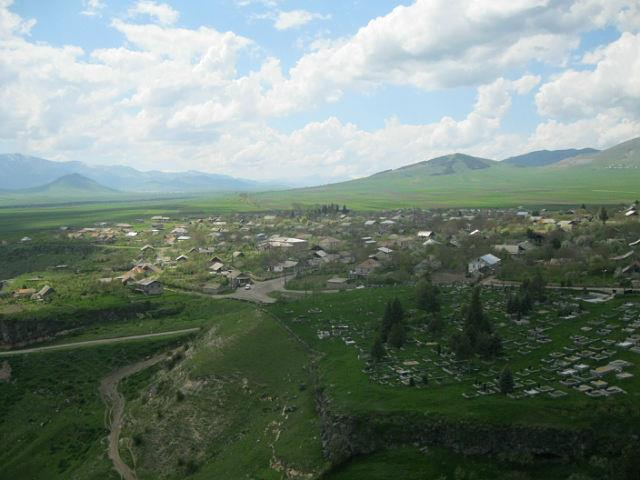

- Location within Armenia
- Coordinates: 40°58′26″N 44°36′38″E
- Country: Armenia
- Province: Lori
- Elevation: 1,270 m (4,170 ft)

Population (2011)
  - Total: 821
- Time zone: UTC+4 (AMT)

Arevatsag (Armenian: Արևածագ) is a village in the Lori Province of Armenia.

== Gallery ==
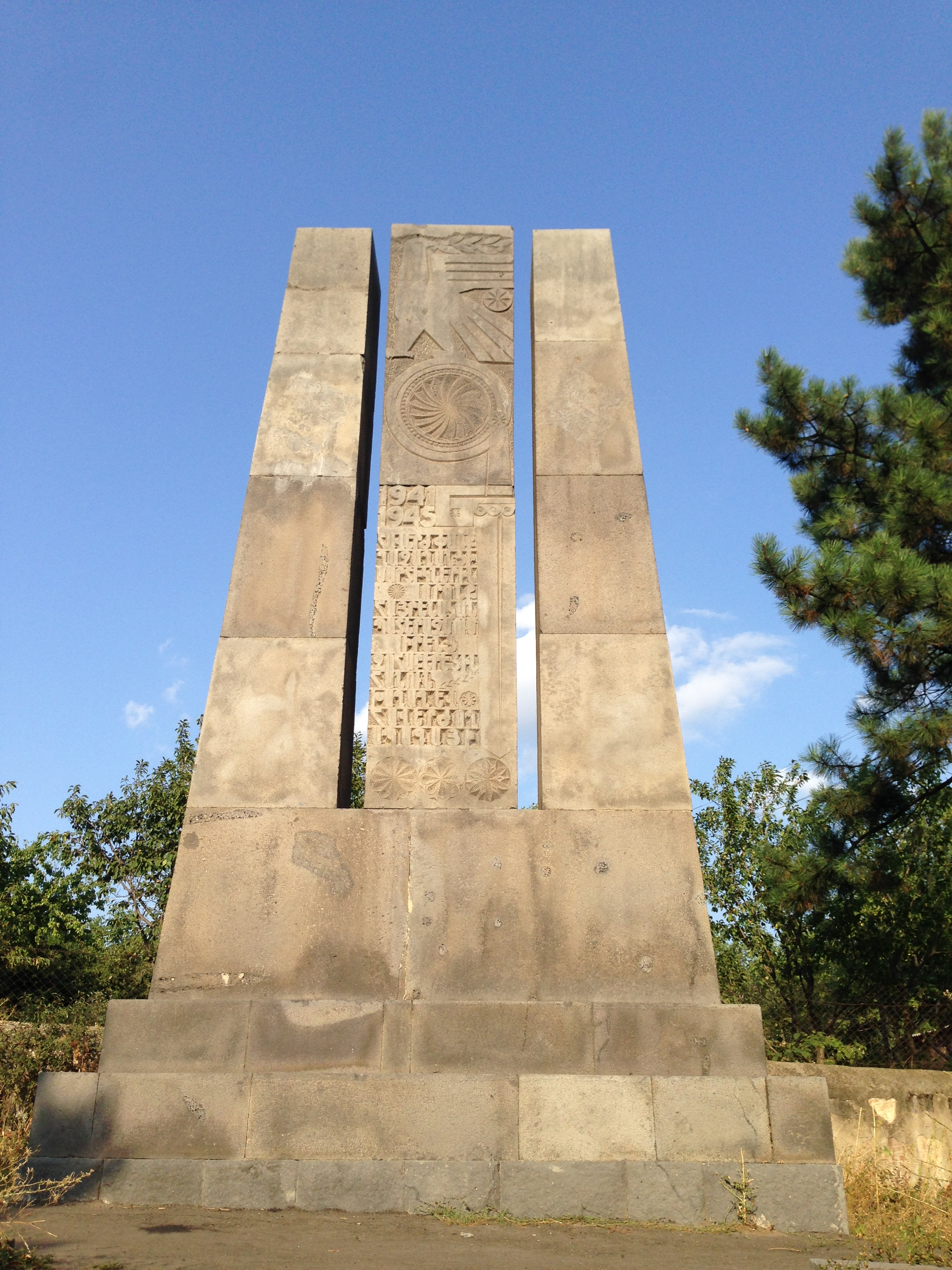

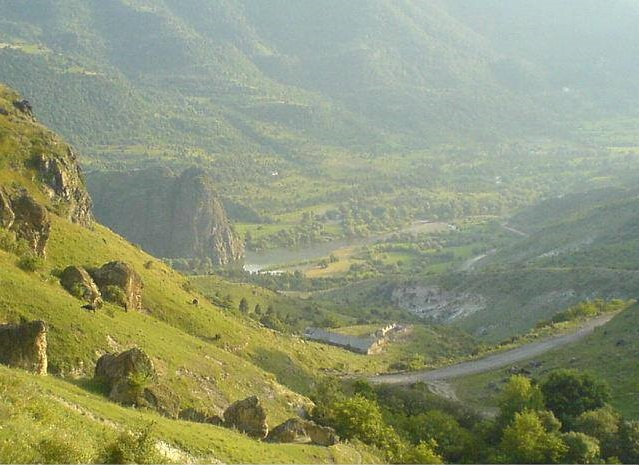

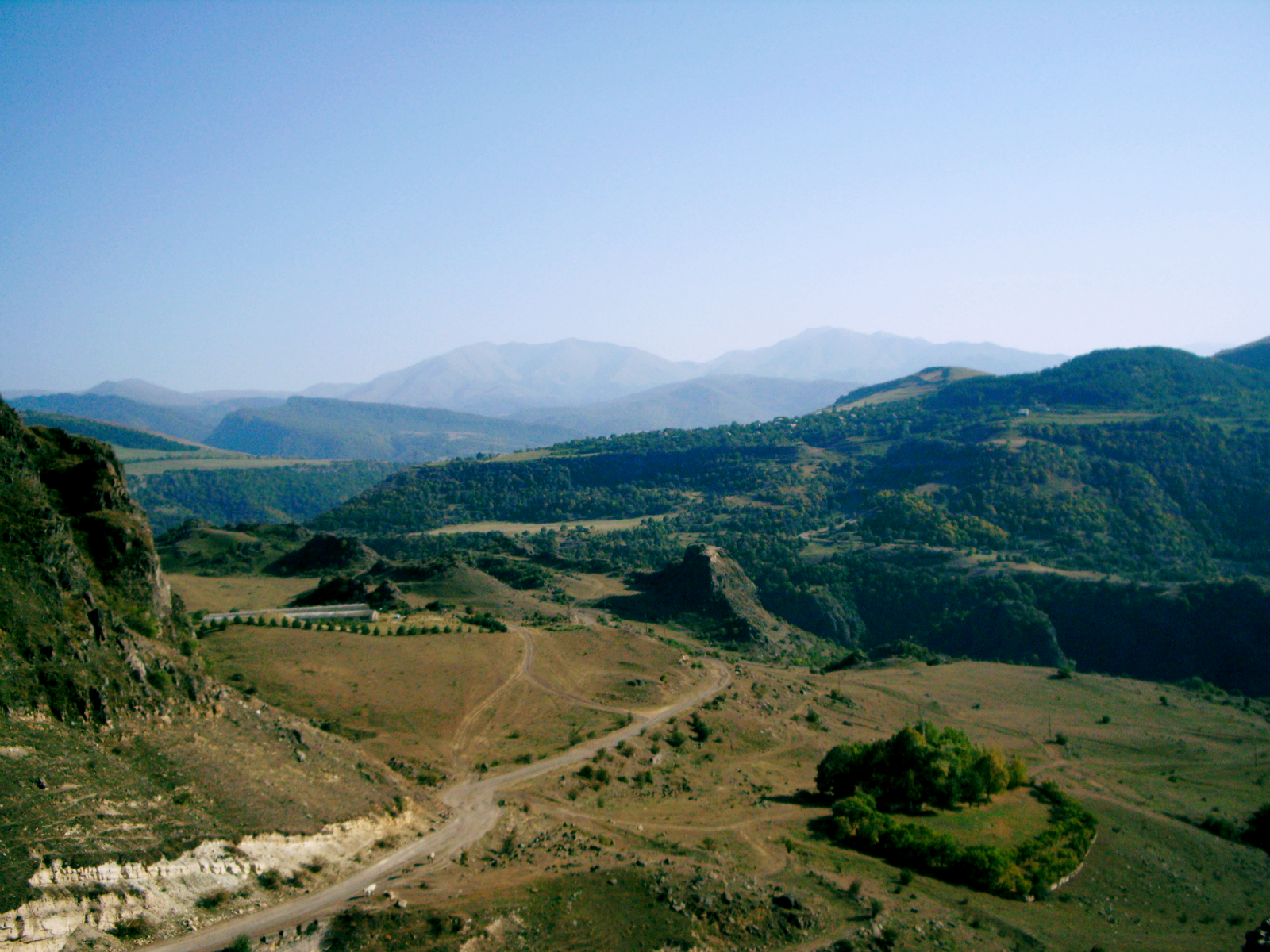

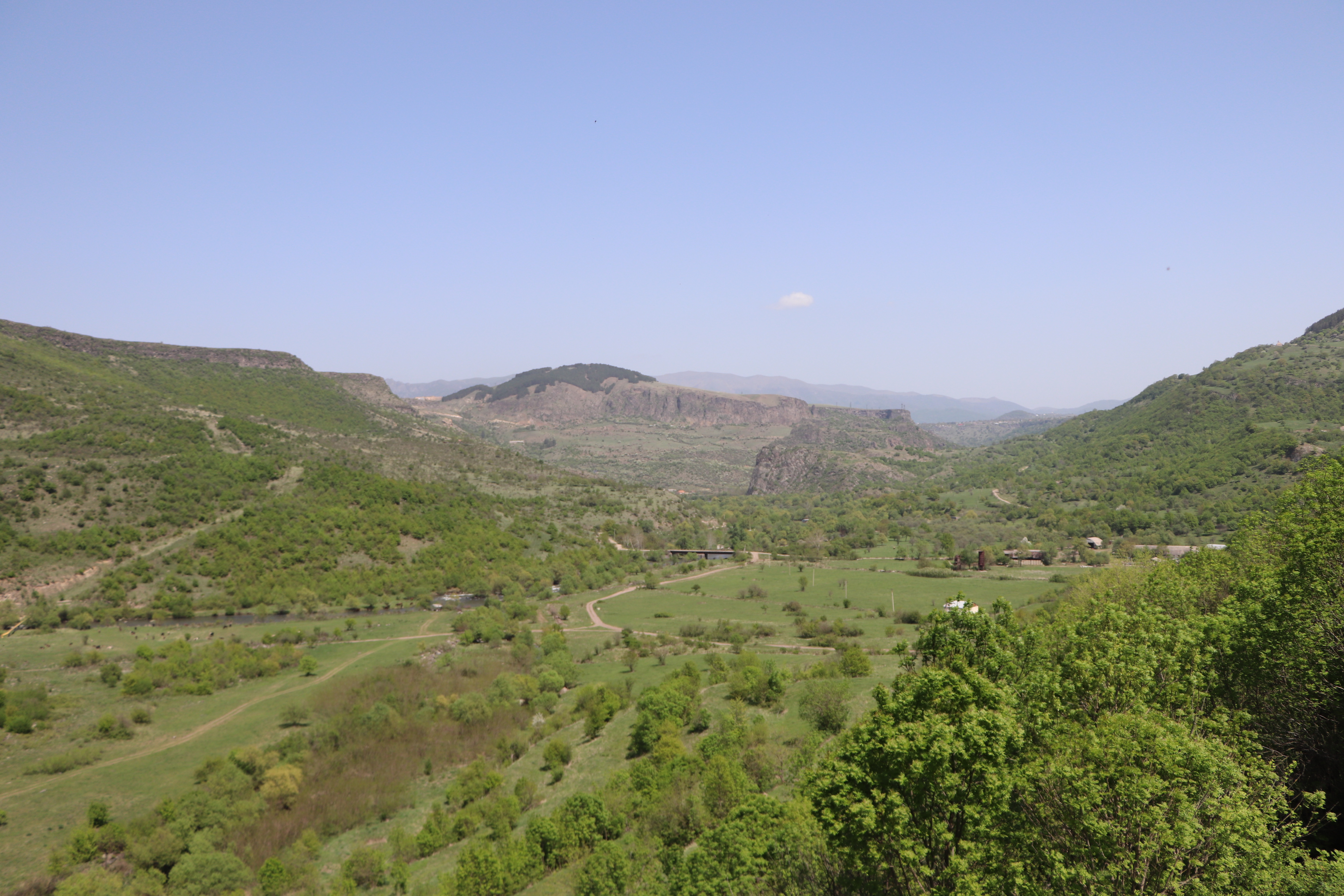

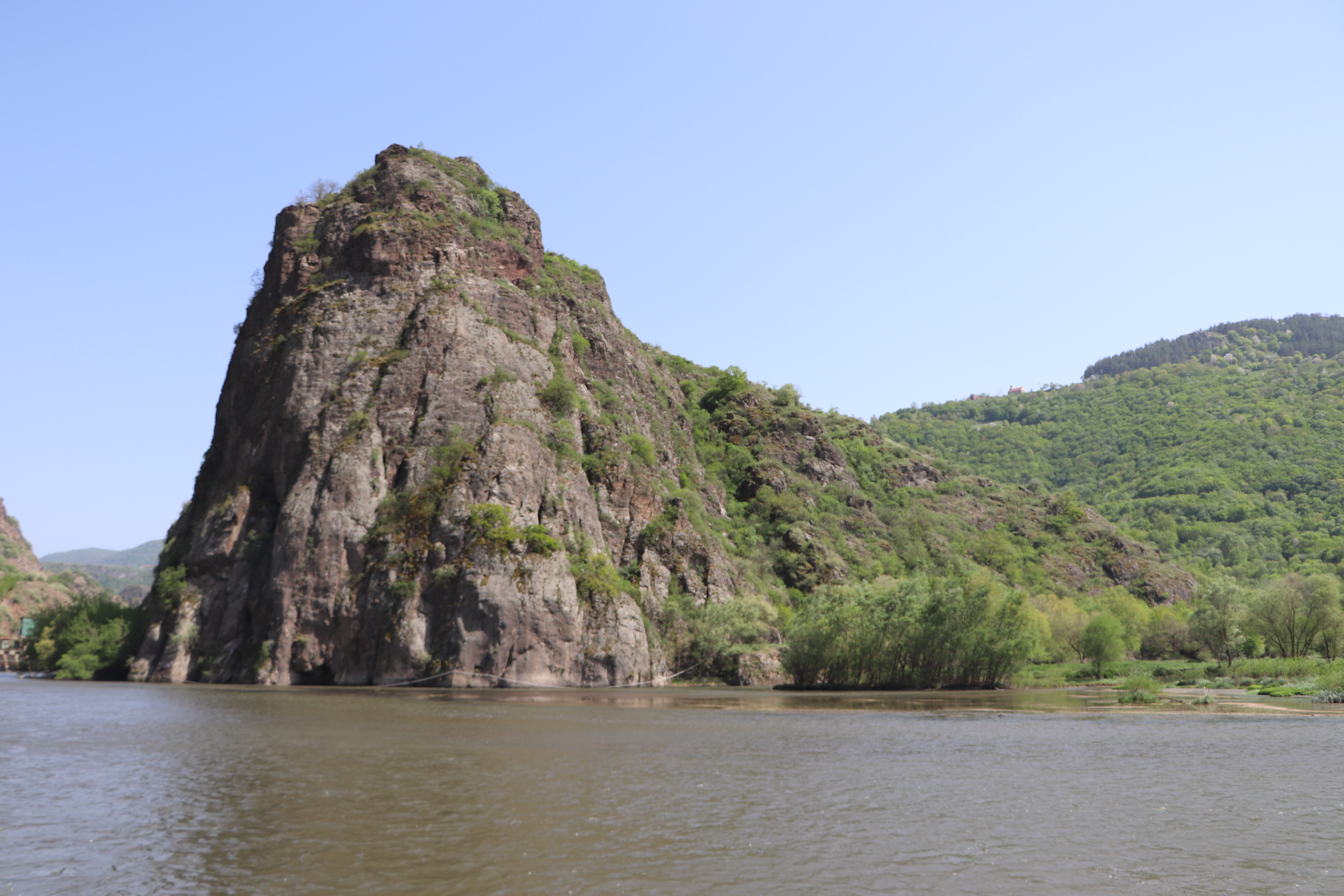
