= Refugees in Azerbaijan =

Azerbaijan has a large number of internally displaced people and refugees, mostly as a result of the Nagorno-Karabakh conflict. The First Nagorno-Karabakh war led to the displacement of approximately 700,000 Azerbaijanis. This figure includes around 500,000 people from Nagorno-Karabakh and the previously occupied surrounding regions, in addition to 186,000 from Armenia.

== Refugees from Armenia ==
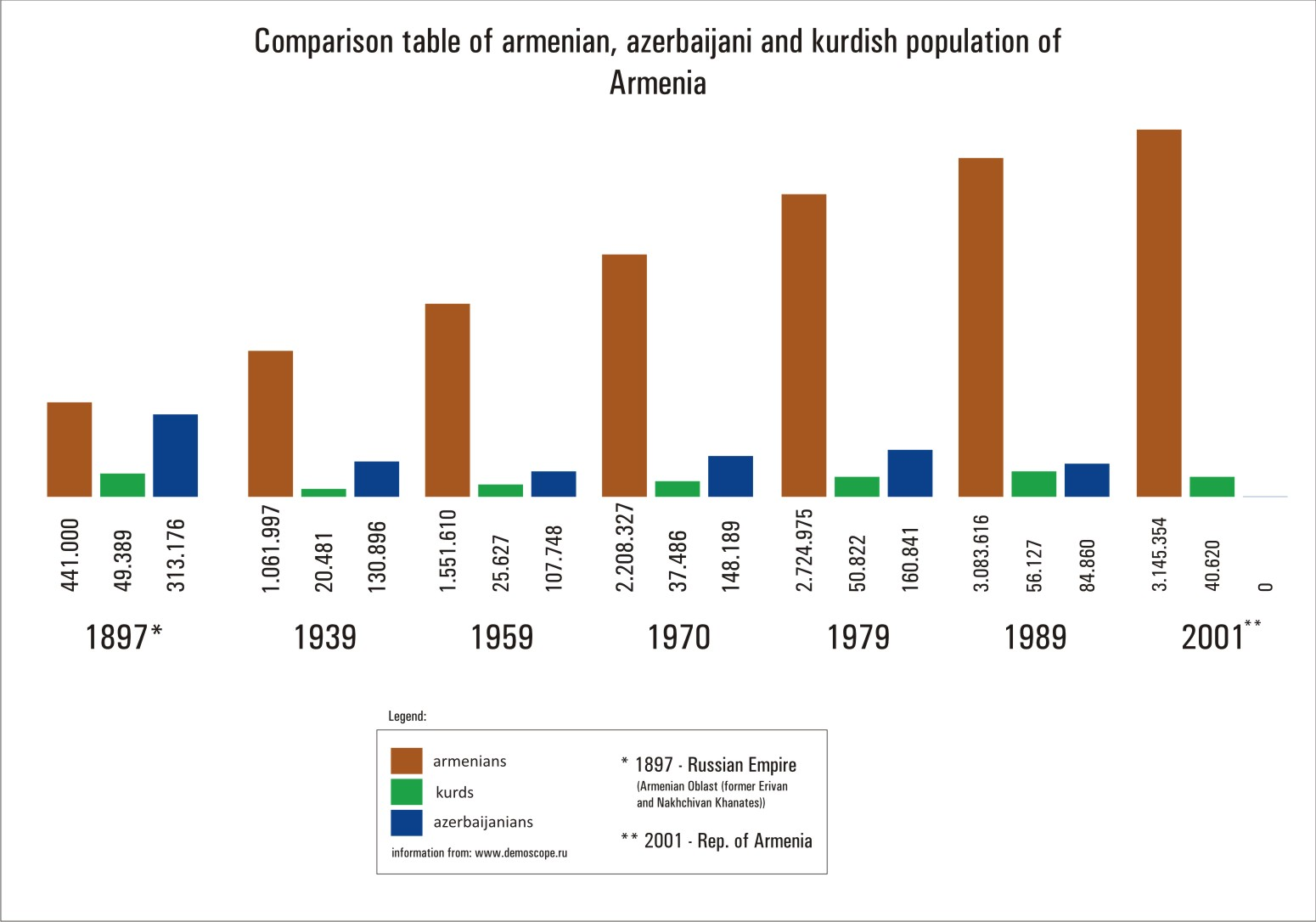
Comparison table of Armenian, Azerbaijani and Kurdish population of Armenia.

According to the 1979 census, Azeris numbered 160,841 and constituted 5.3% of Armenia's population. Civil unrest in Nagorno-Karabakh in 1987 led to Azeris' being often harassed and forced to leave Armenia. On 25 January 1988, the first wave of Azeri refugees from Armenia settled in the city of Sumgait. Another major wave occurred in November 1988 as Azeris were either expelled by the nationalists and local or state authorities or fled fearing for their lives. Violence took place as a result of ethnic conflicts; in November 1988, 25 Azeris were killed, according to Armenian sources (of those 20 in the town of Gugark during the Gugark pogrom); and 217, according to Azerbaijani sources.

Thus, in 1988–91 the remaining Azeris were forced to flee primarily to Azerbaijan. It is impossible to determine the exact population numbers for Azeris in Armenia at the time of the conflict's escalation since the 1989 census forced Azeri migration from Armenia was already in progress. UNHCR's estimate is 200,000 persons.

According to the Azerbaijani government at the time of the ceasefire in 1994 there were about 250,000 Azeri refugees from Armenia. According to the 1998 Citizenship Law they are all eligible for citizenship. By the end of 2001, UNHCR estimated that most of them were believed to have naturalized or be in the process of doing so.

== Internally displaced persons from Nagorno-Karabakh and the adjacent territories ==
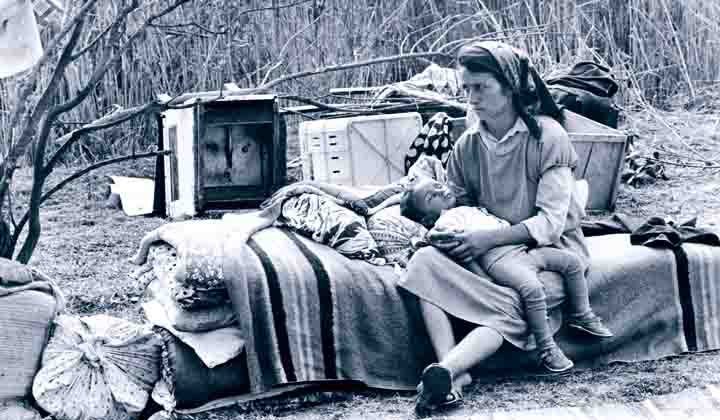
Refugees in Azerbaijan

During the First Nagorno-Karabakh War, territories constituting the former NKAO region of Azerbaijan and the seven adjacent districts (some of them partly) were occupied by the Armenian forces. As a result, non-Armenians had to leave their homes. Azerbaijan now has one of the highest numbers of internally displaced persons (IDPs) per capita in the world. The IDPs are presented in all of the 76 administrative districts in Azerbaijan. Initially, most of them lived in tent camps and public buildings such as schools, hostels, and dormitories. Since 2001, the Government increased its efforts to solve IDPs' problems. In 2002, the construction of new settlements started, and by the end of 2007, all tent camps were abolished.

The Government of Azerbaijan with the help of the international community has started drafting a Framework Plan for the Return of IDPs to the occupied regions after the settlement of the Nagorno-Karabakh Conflict (The Great Return Programme).

== Meskhetian Turks ==
In 1944, Meskhetian Turks were deported en masse from Georgia to Central Asia by Joseph Stalin. One of the regions they resettled in was Fergana Valley, Uzbekistan. In 1989, interethnic violence occurred there triggering an evacuation of Meskhetian Turks from Uzbekistan. About 46,000 Meskheti Turk refugees had resettled in Azerbaijan in 1989 though their real homeland is Georgia and they still were hoping to return there, even 50 years after Stalin had deported them to Central Asia. According to the 1998 Citizenship Law, they are all eligible for citizenship. By the end of 2001, UNHCR estimated that most of them were believed to have naturalized.

== Statistics ==
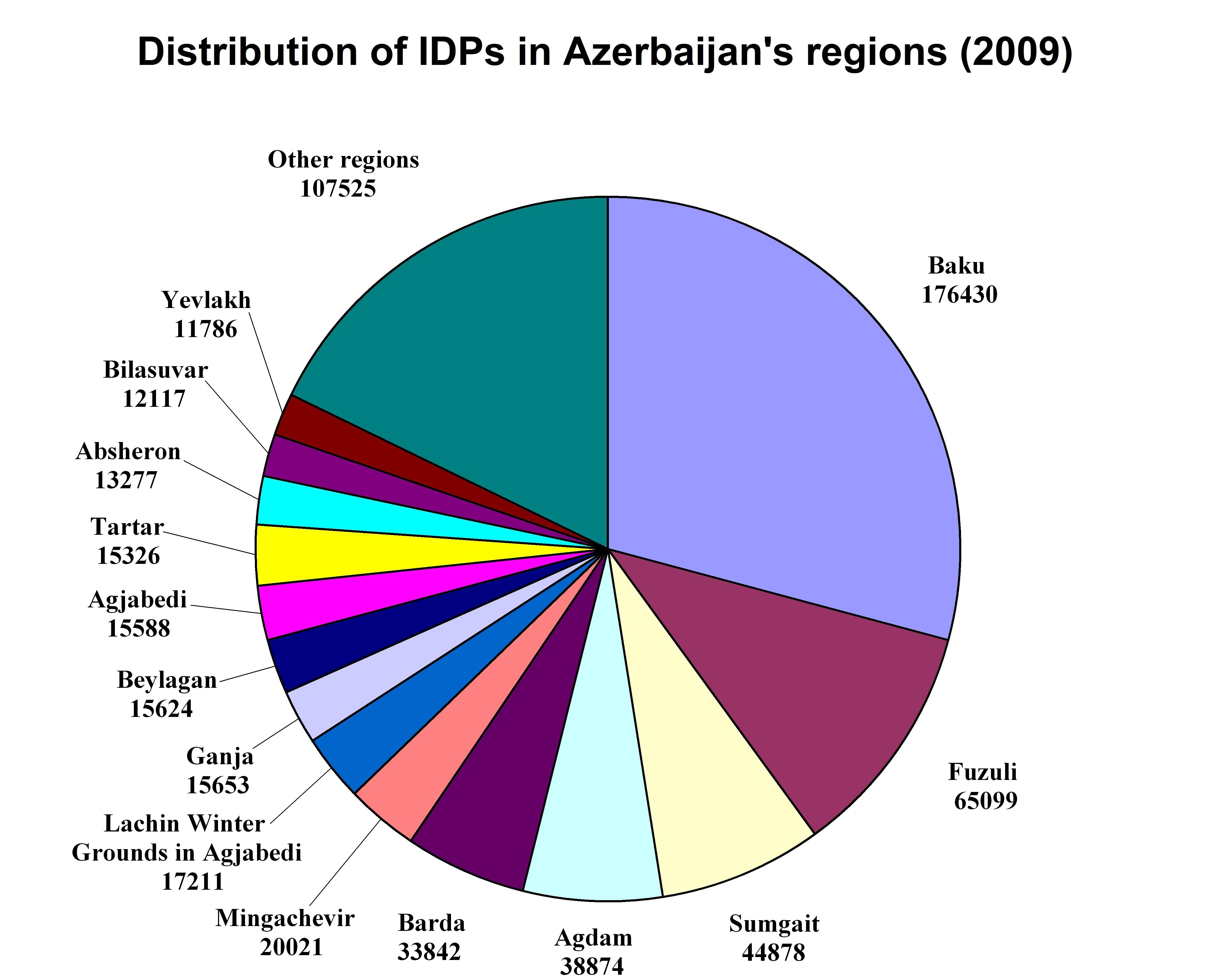
Distribution of IDPs in Azerbaijan's regions according to the Government of Azerbaijan

According to State Committee of Azerbaijan for Refugees and Internally Displaced Persons, there were 603,251 IDPs in Azerbaijan in March 2009. The majority live in and around Baku, as well as in Sumgayit. Significant numbers of IDPs also live along the central-southern route of Fuzuli–Aghdam–Aghjabadi–Barda–Mingechevir–Ganja, the northern route of Shamakhi–Ismayilli–Qabala–Shaki and the southern route of Sabirabad–Saatly–Imishli–Beylagan.

== Problems ==
Although relations between IDPs and the local population are generally amicable and there is a high level of tolerance among the local population, there are instances of conflicts arising due to the special status of IDPs (such as privileged access to employment, government financial assistance, free health services and property ownership privileges).

== Gallery ==
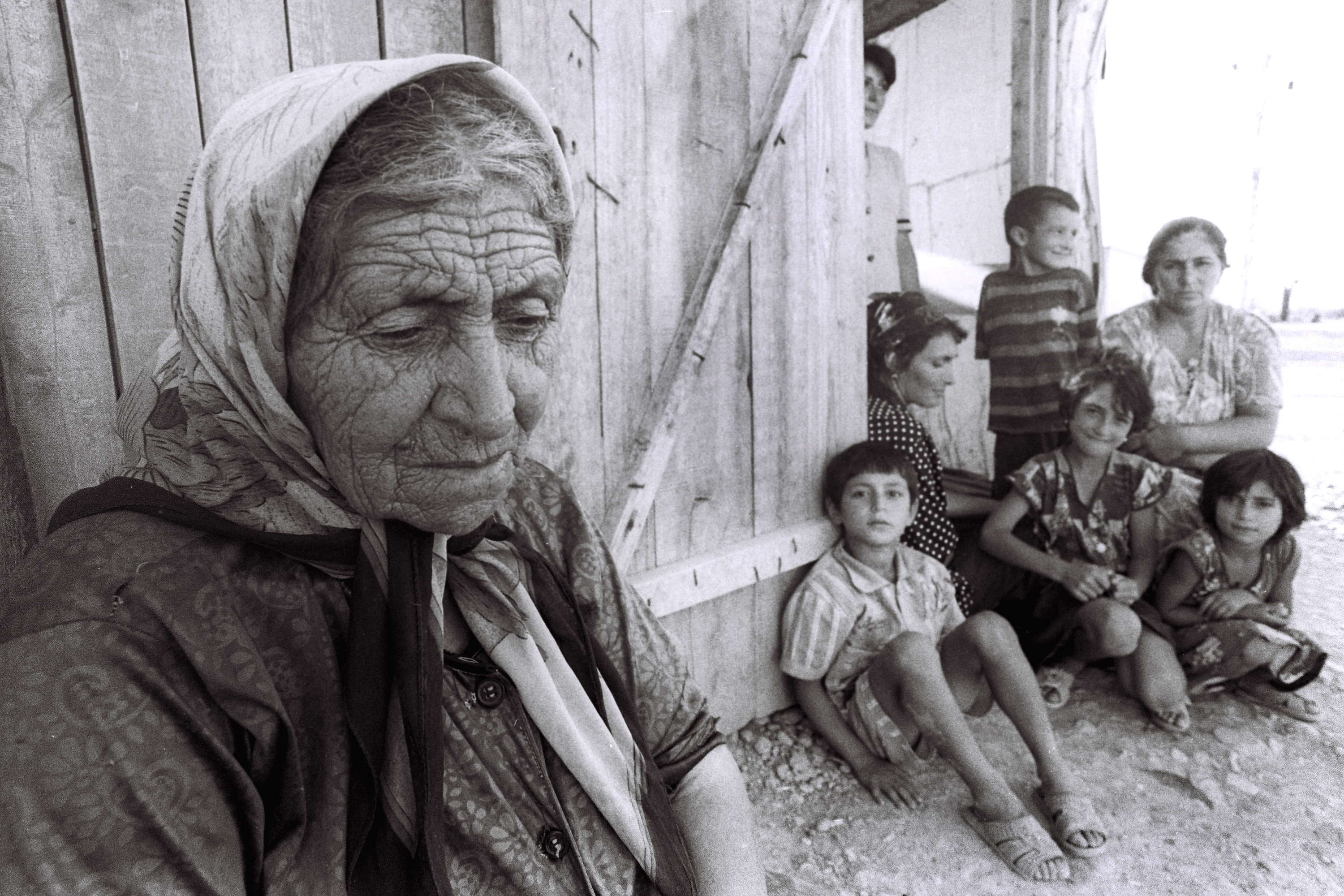

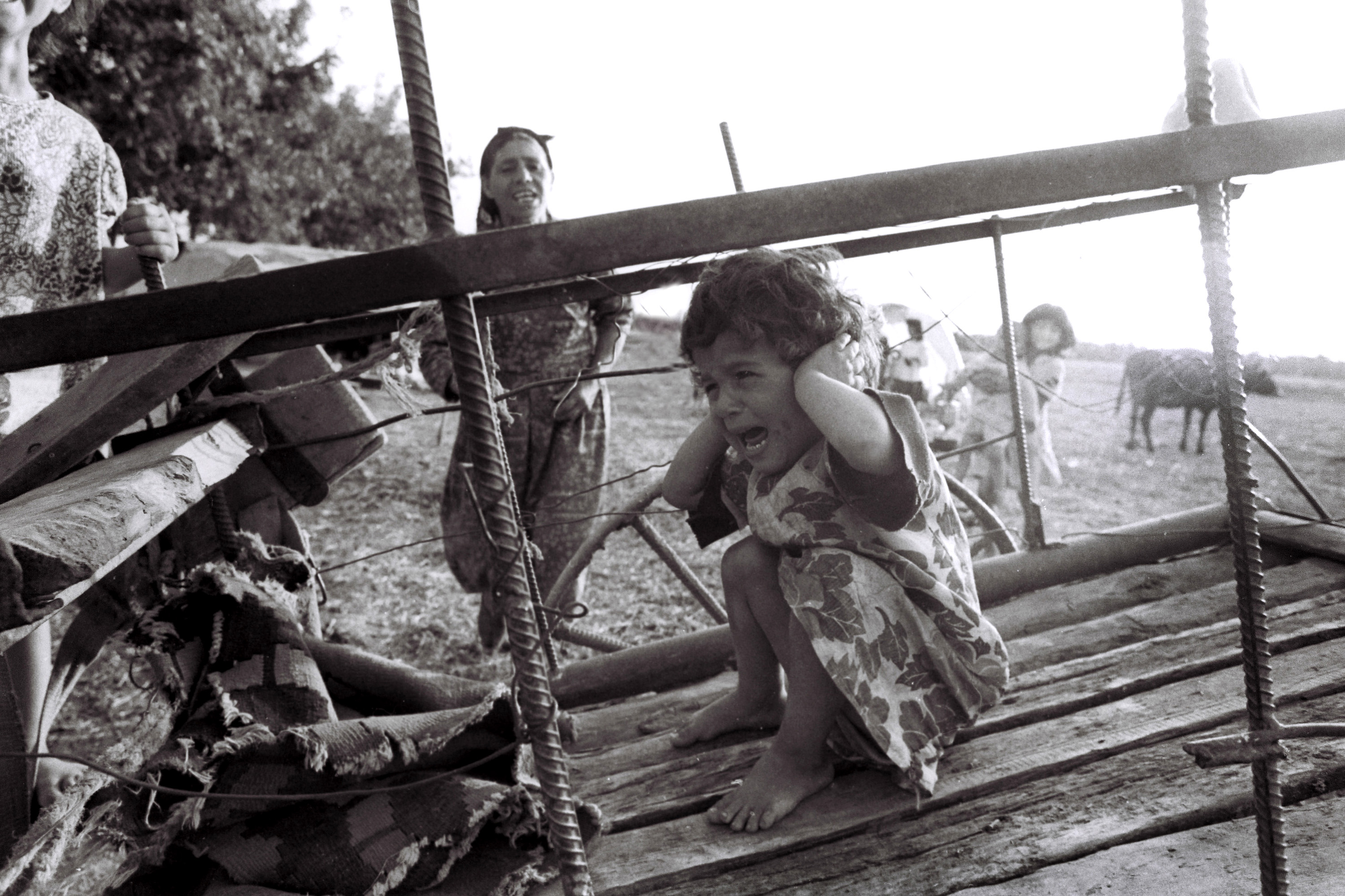

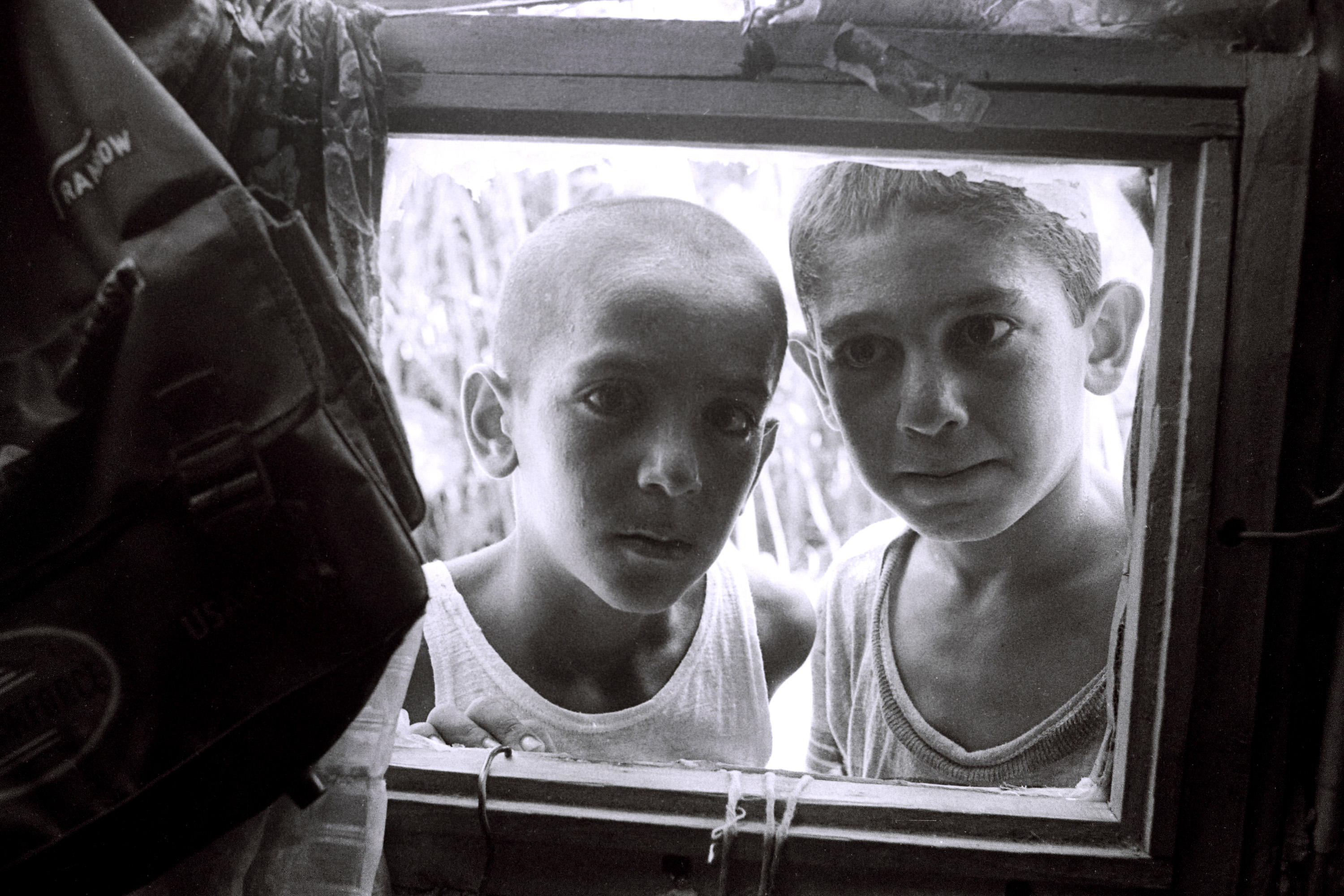

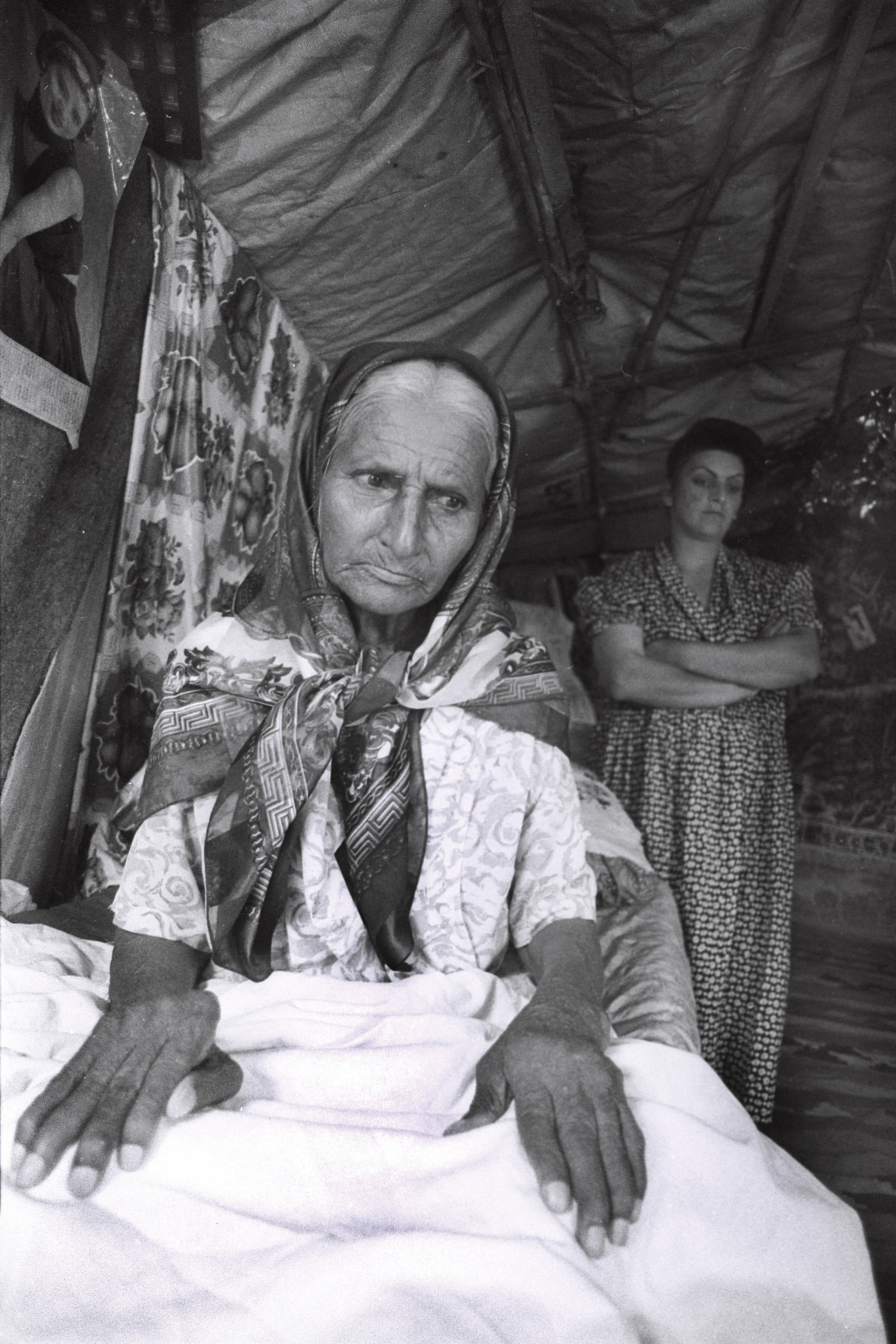

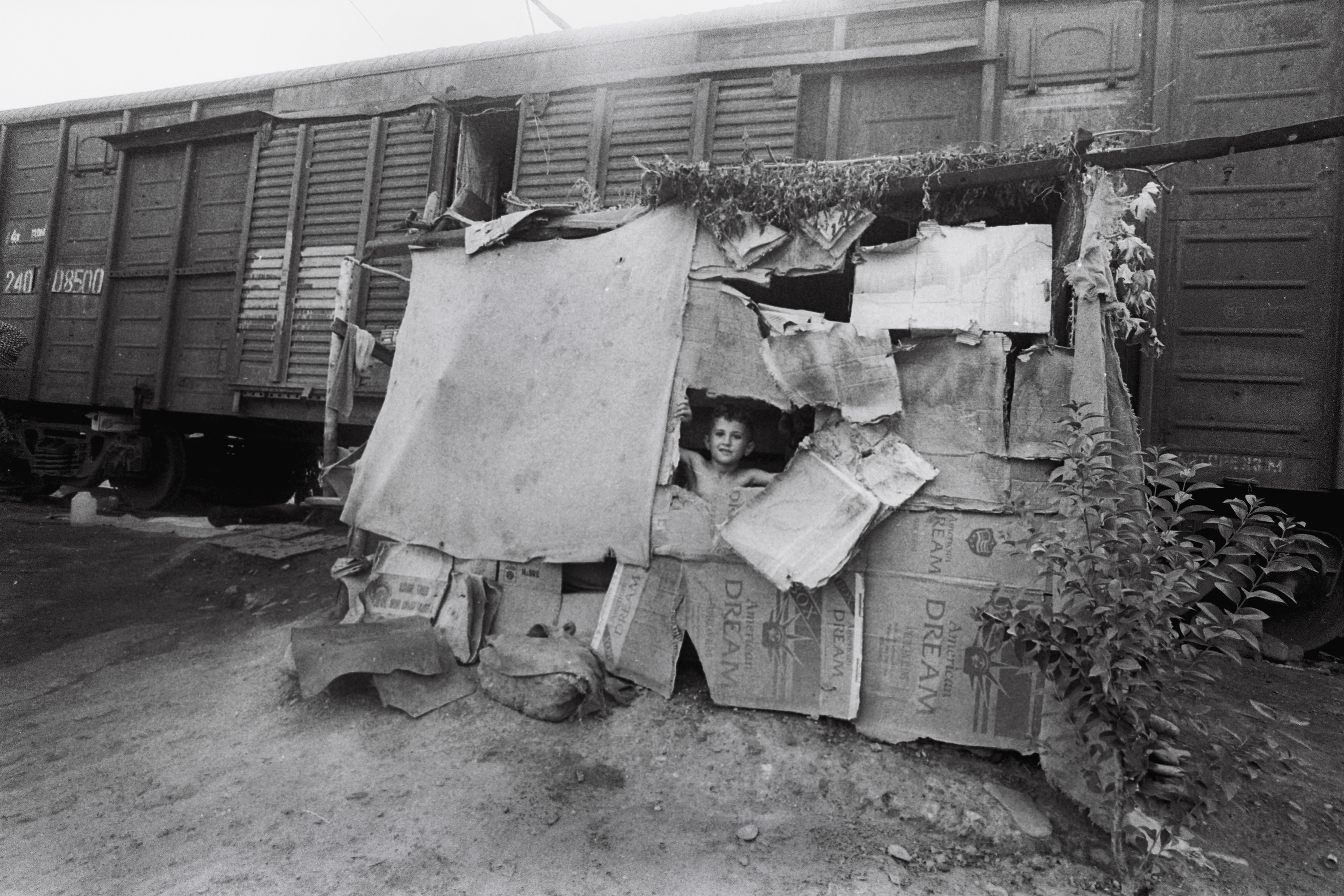

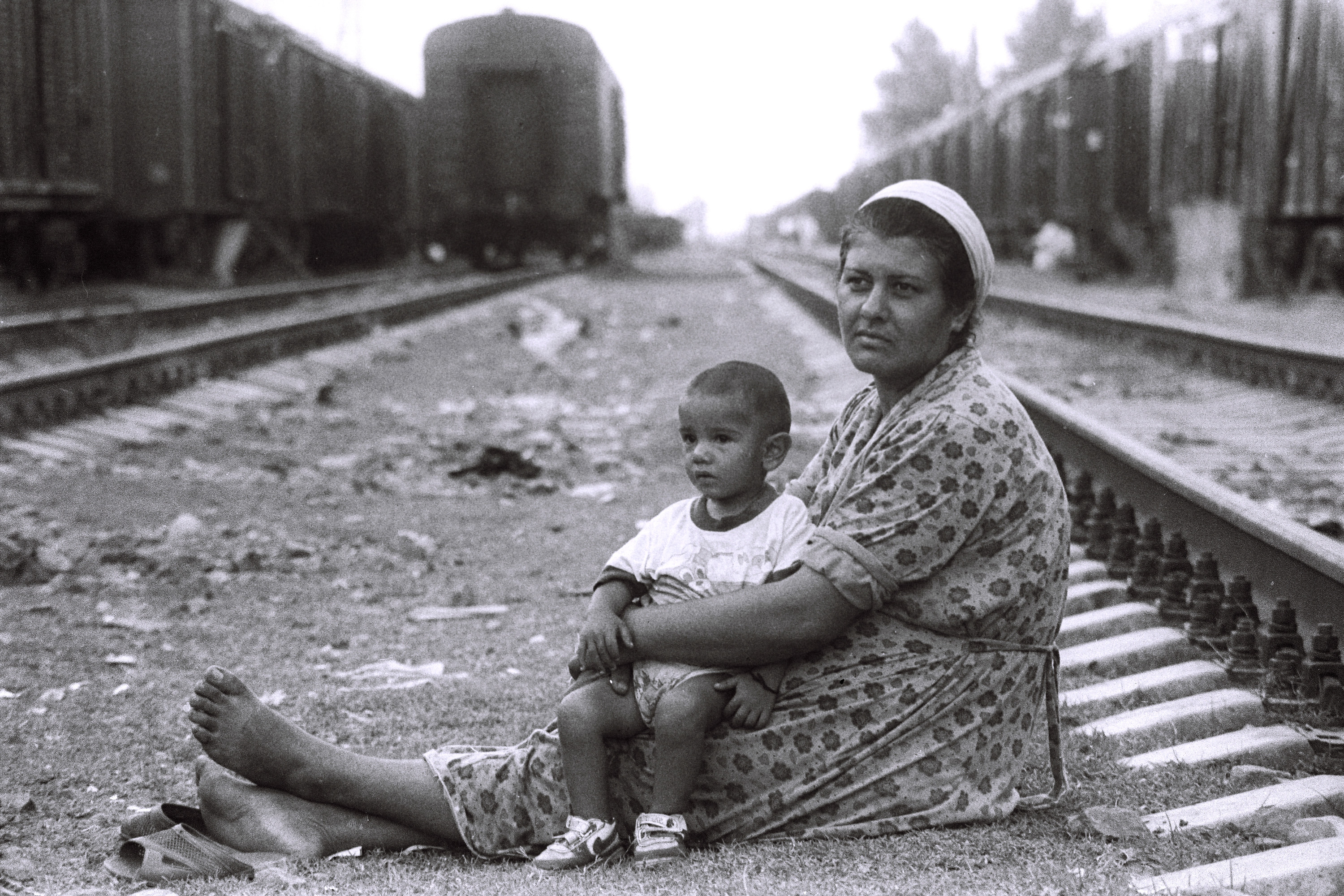

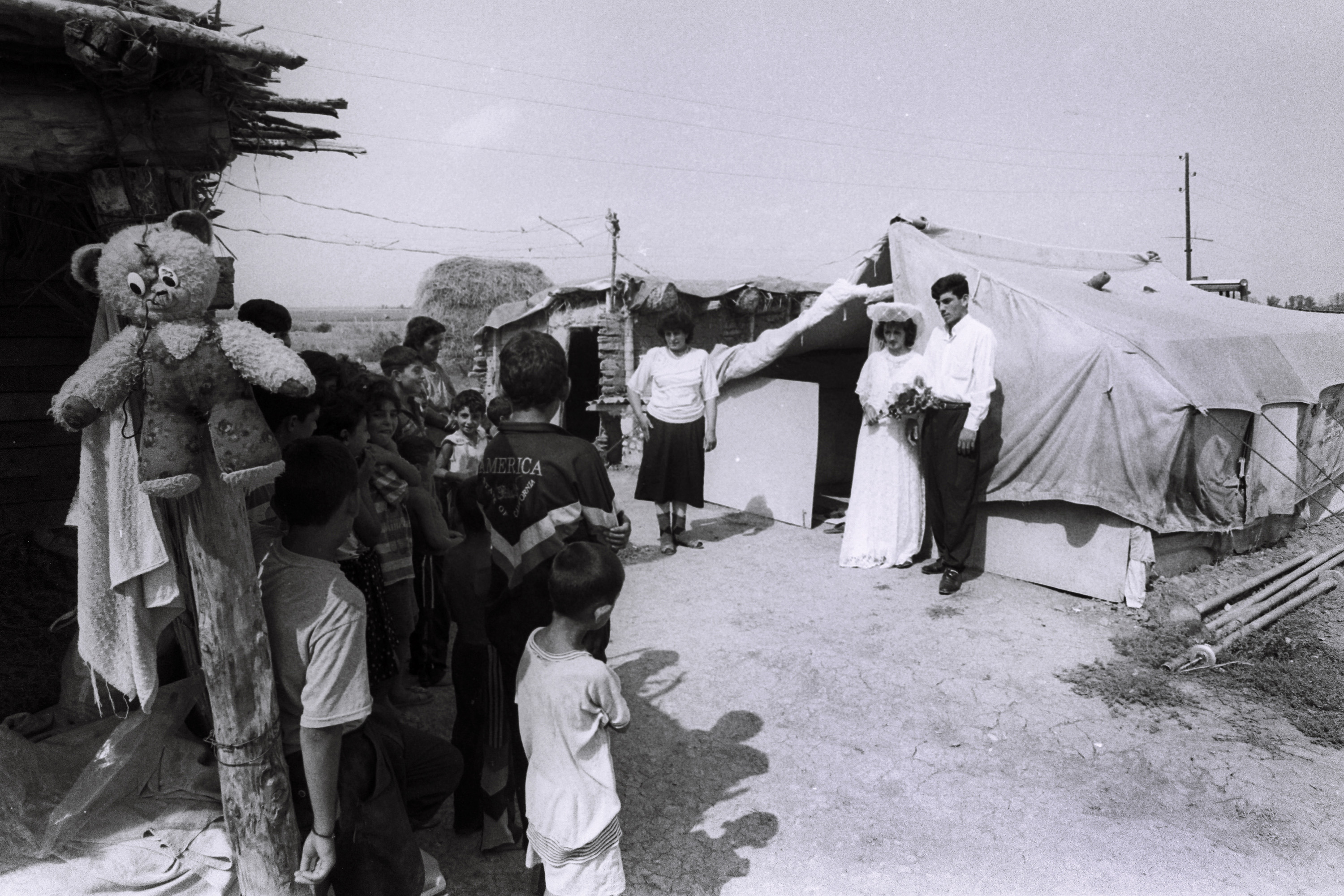

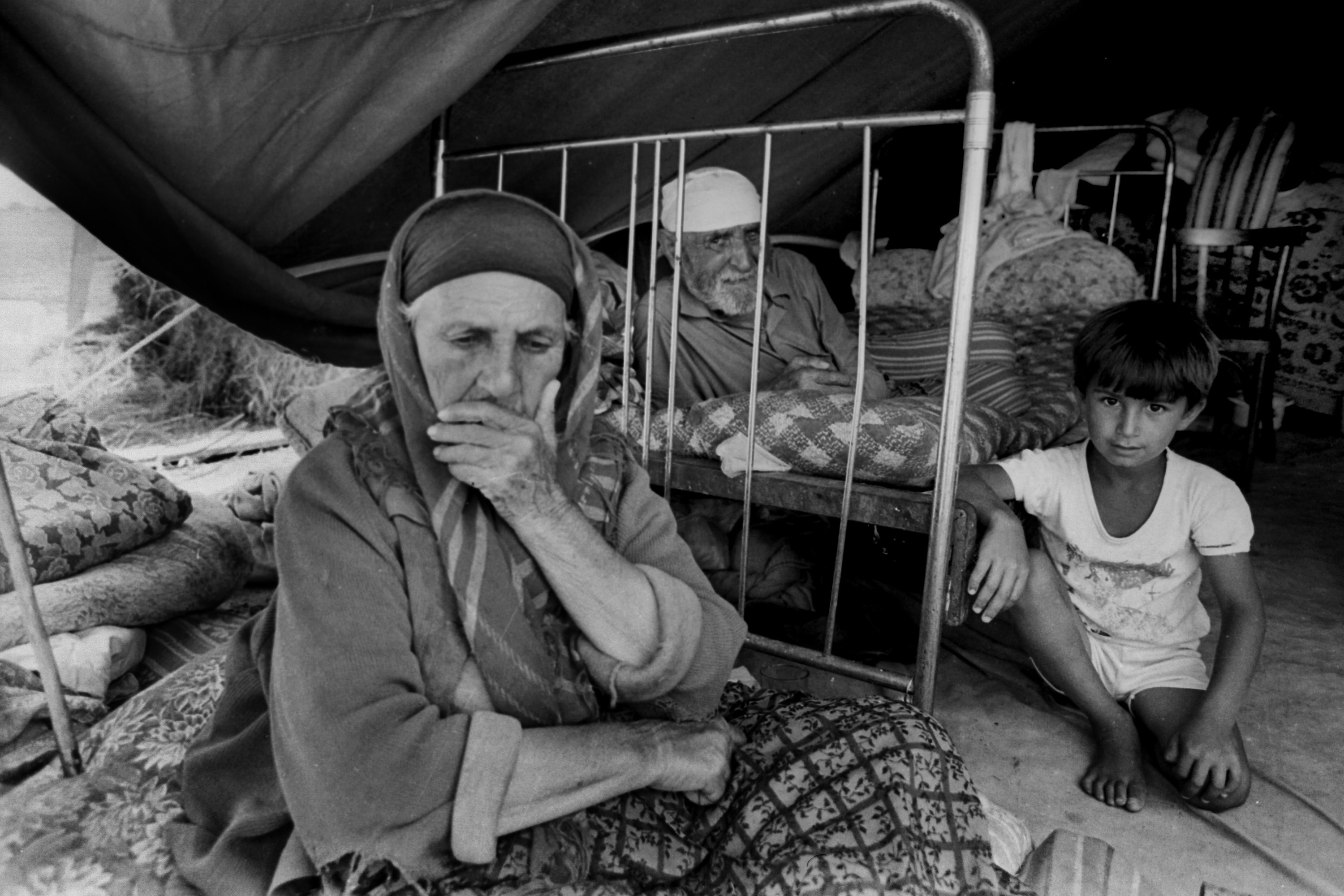

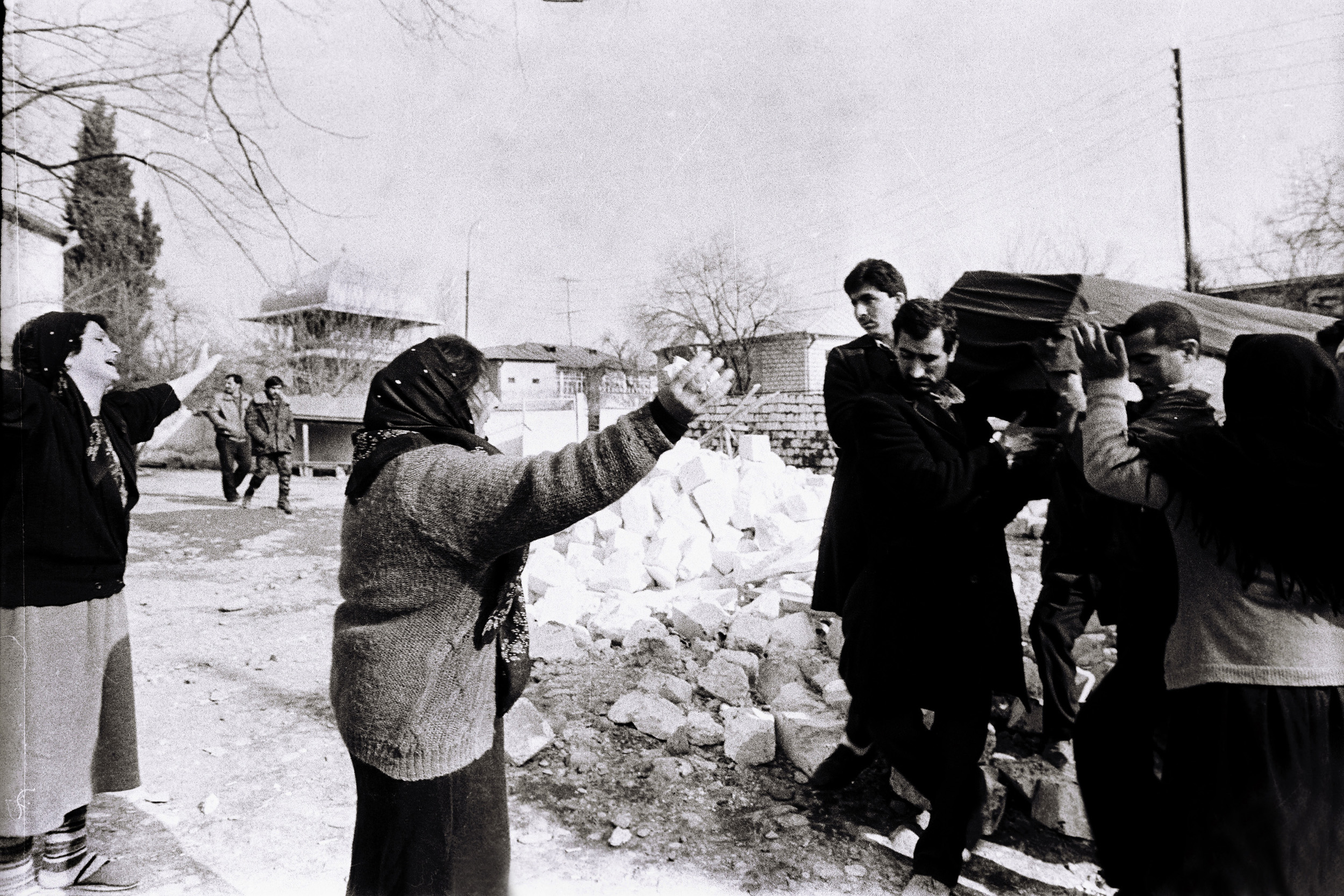

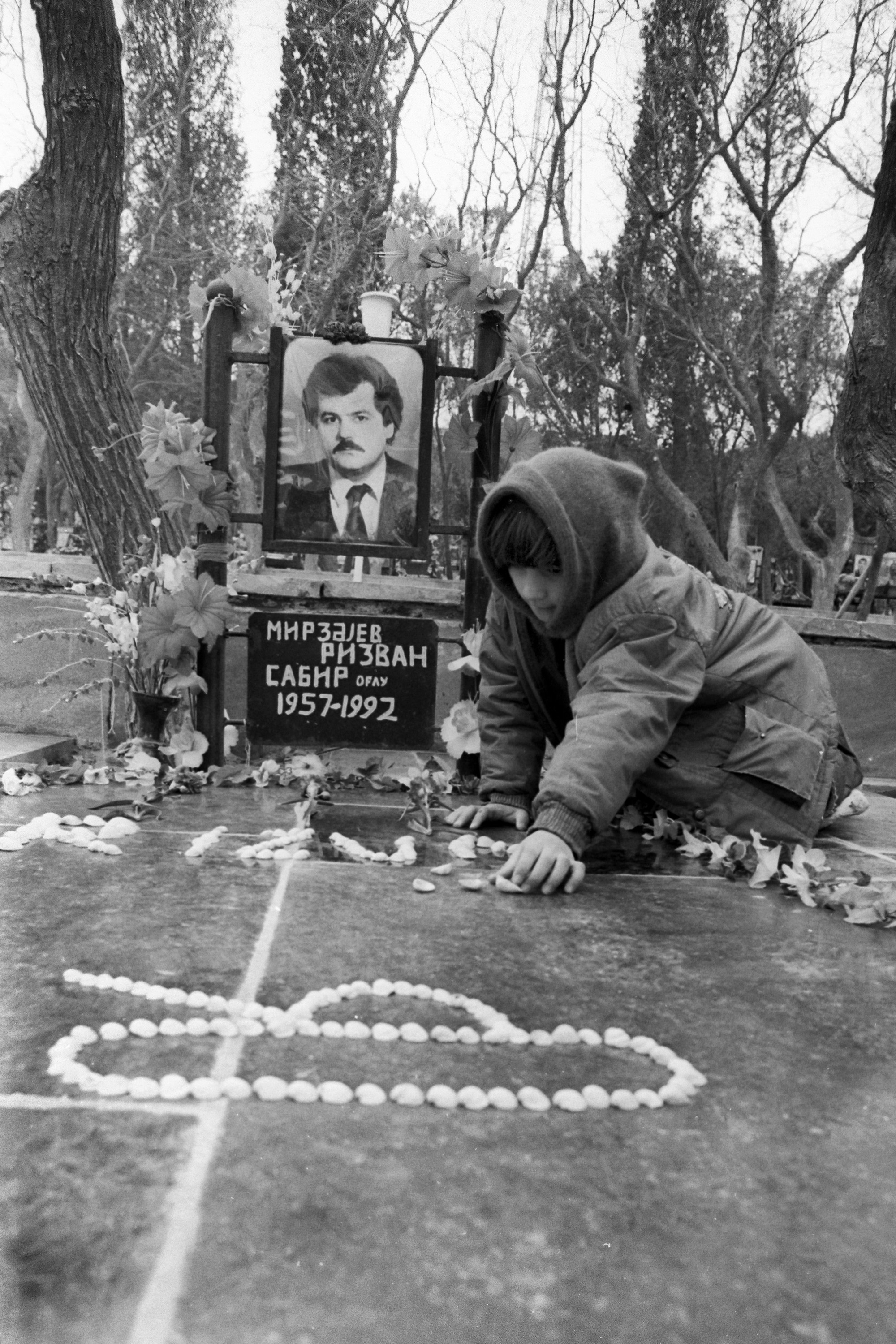

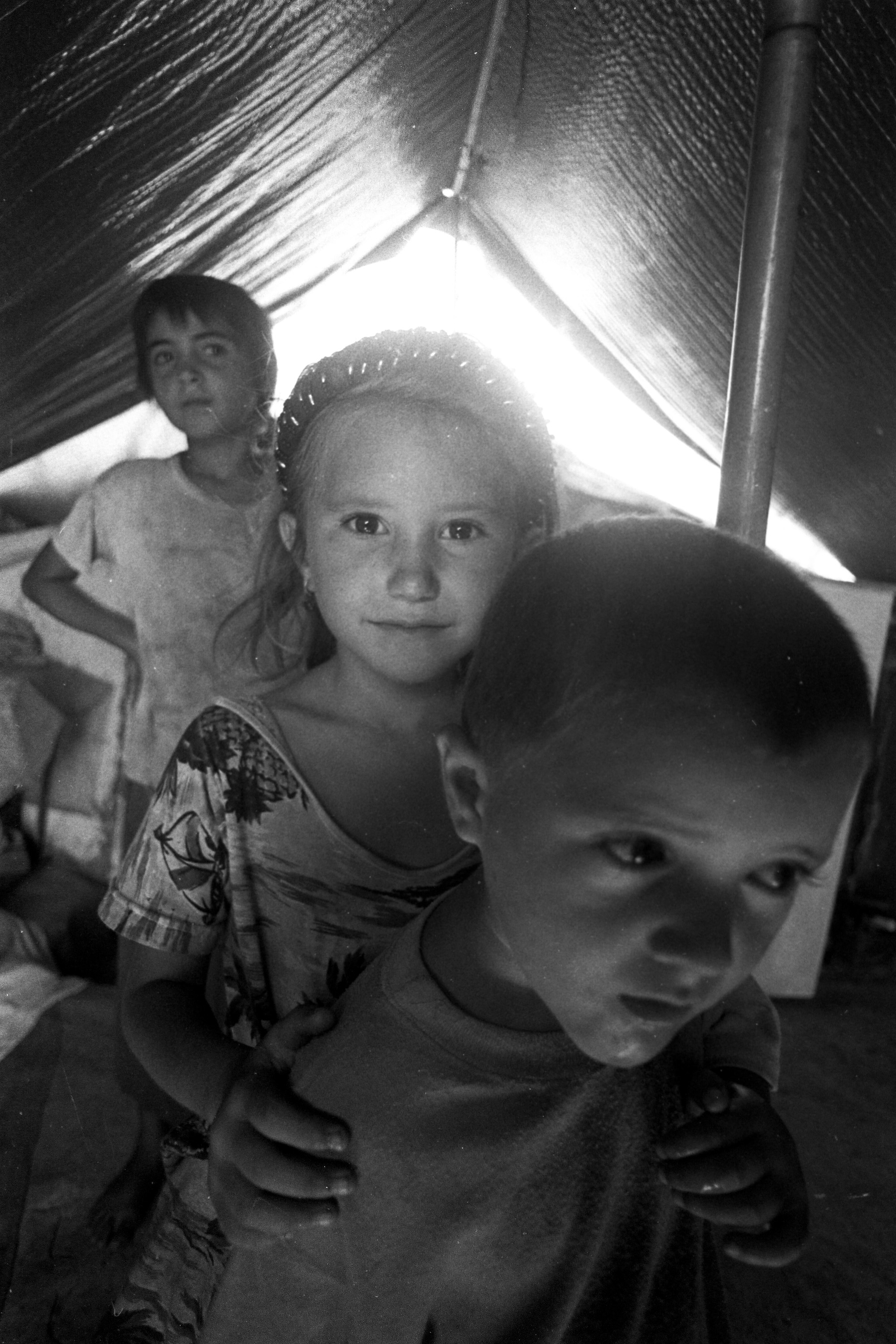

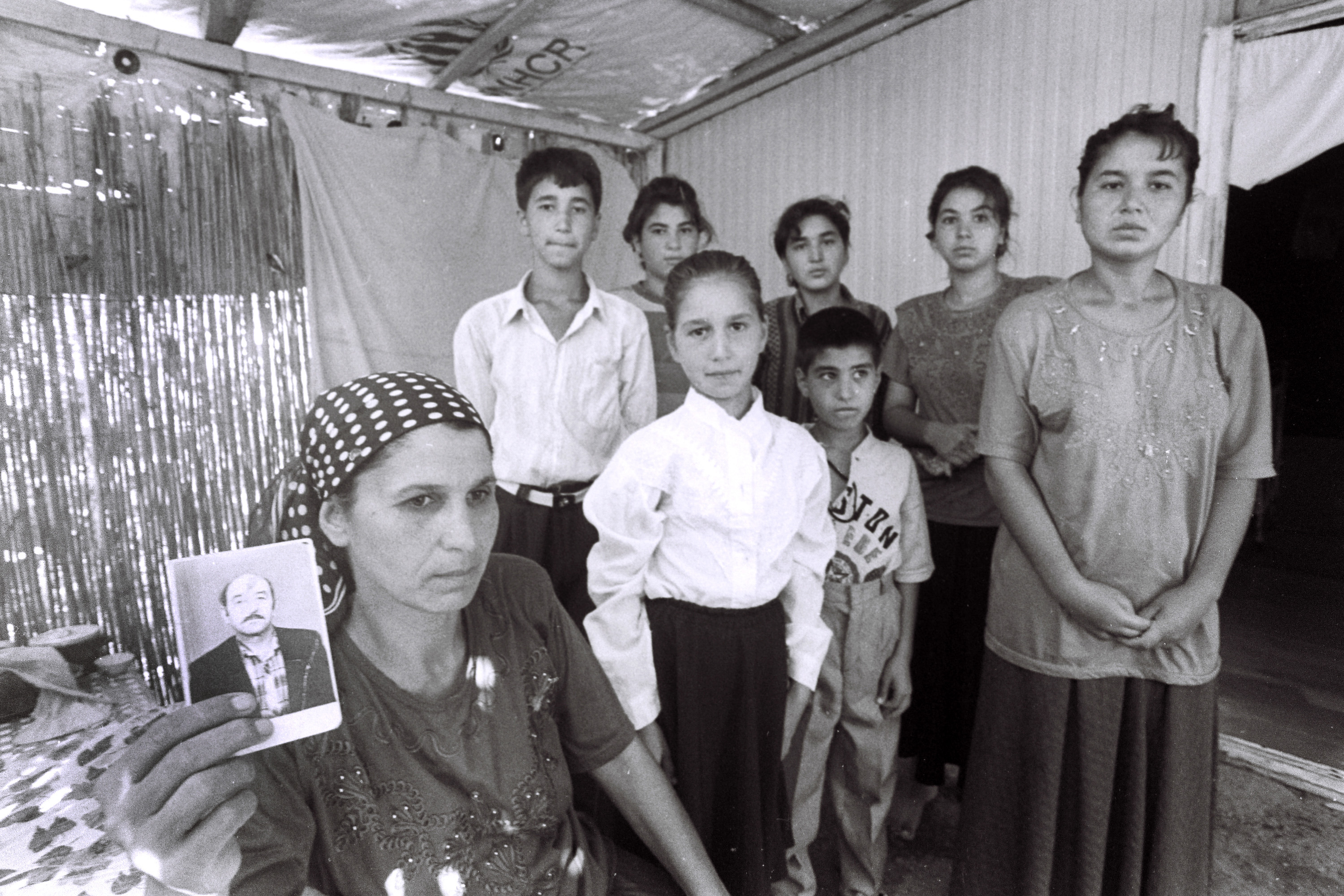

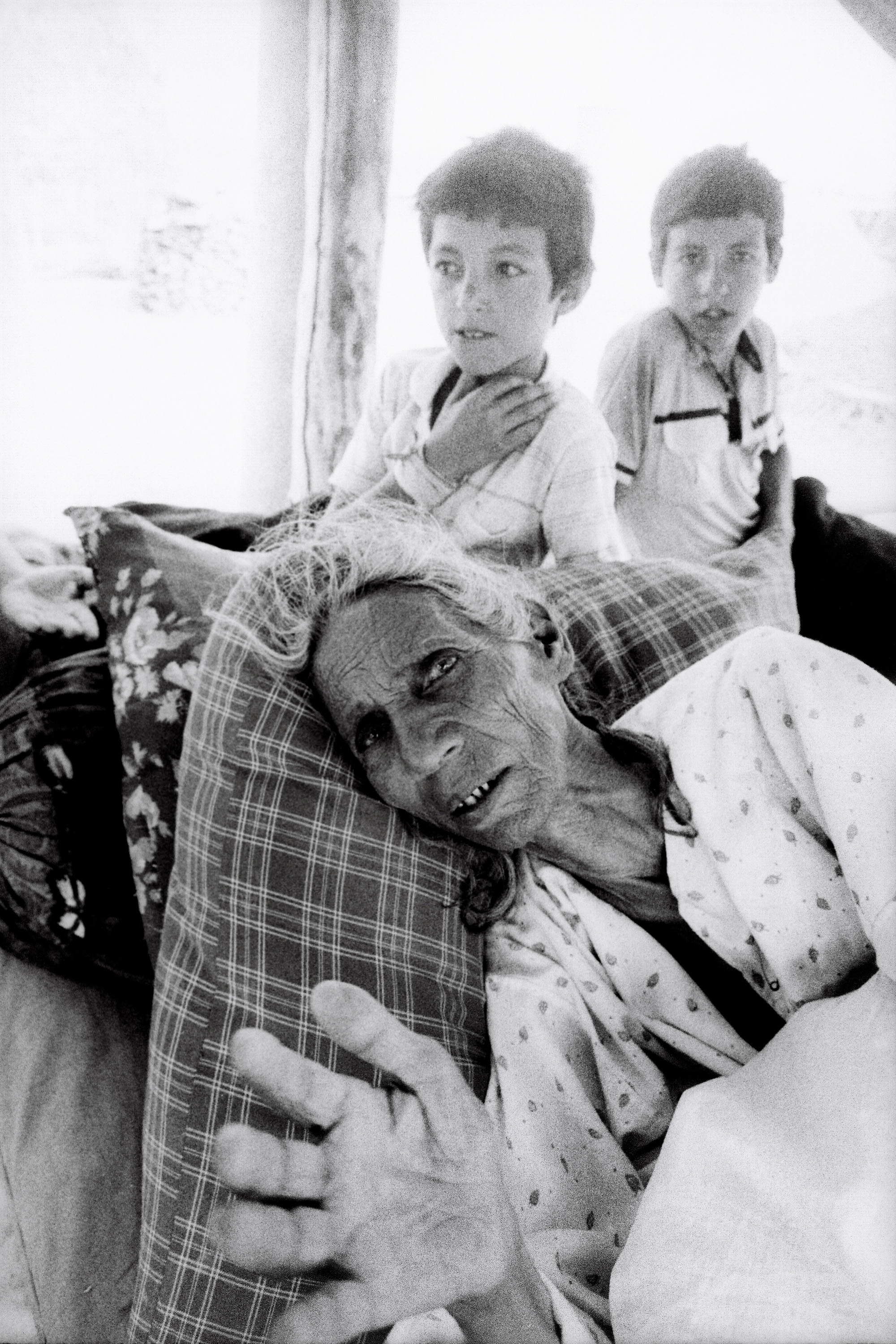

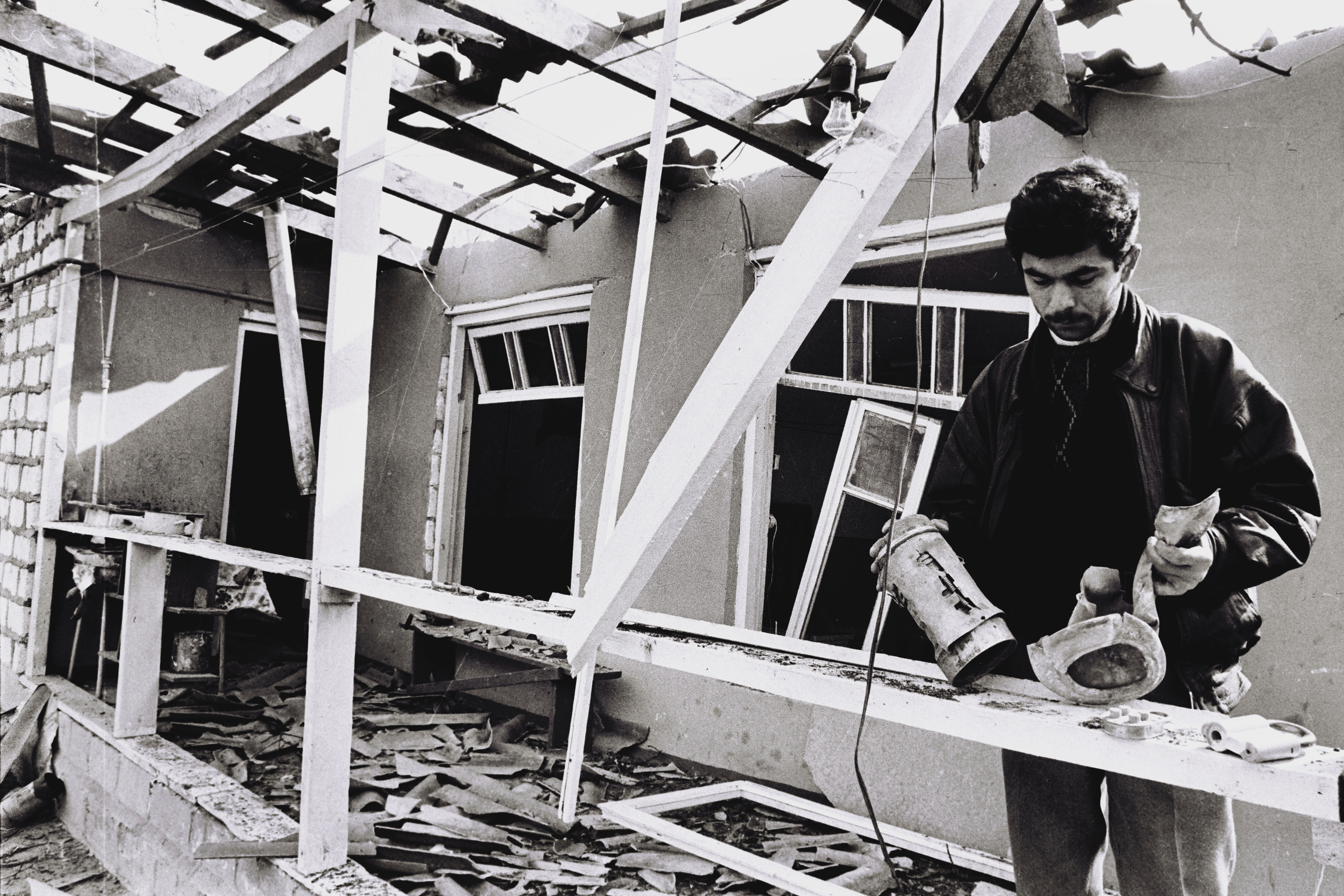

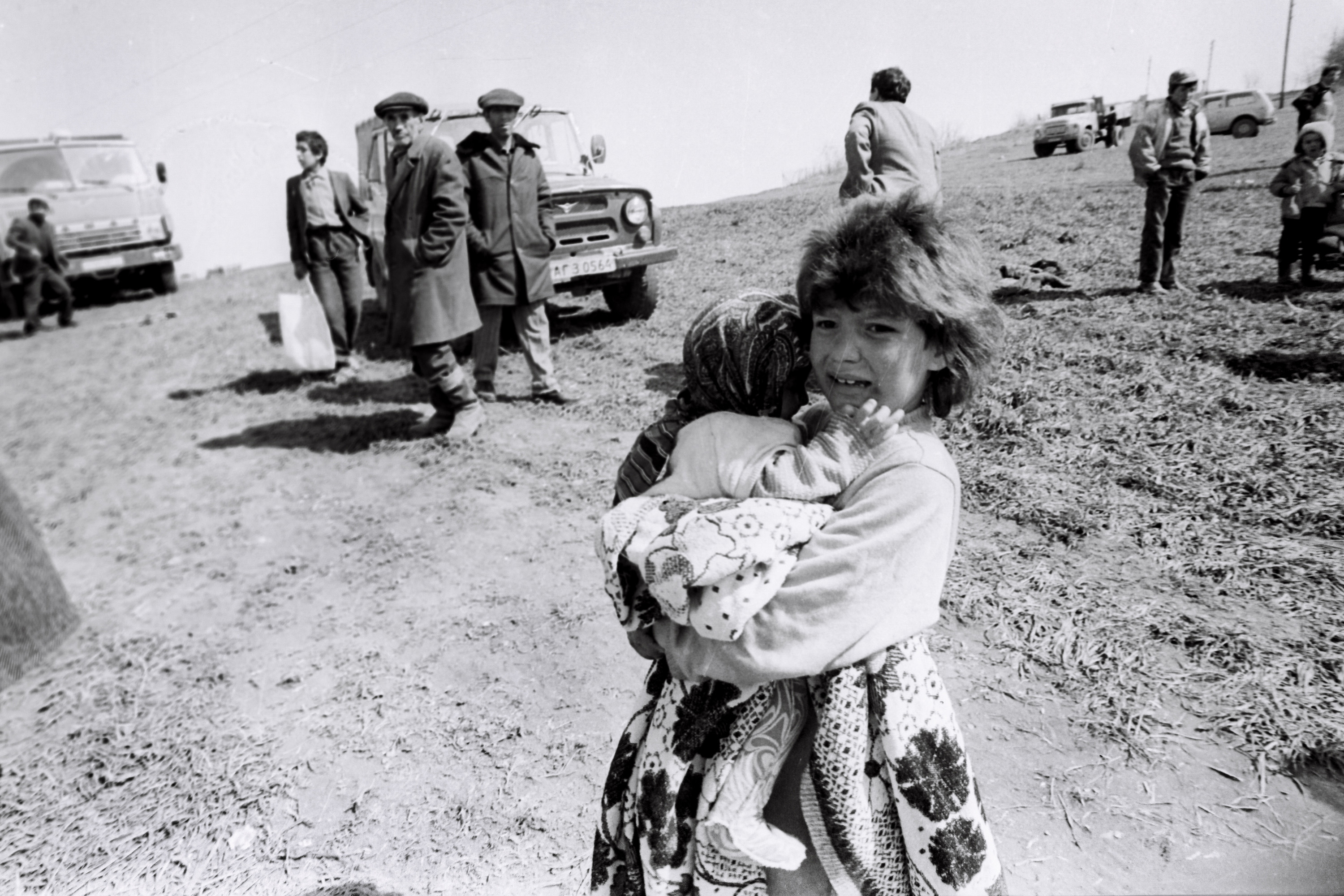

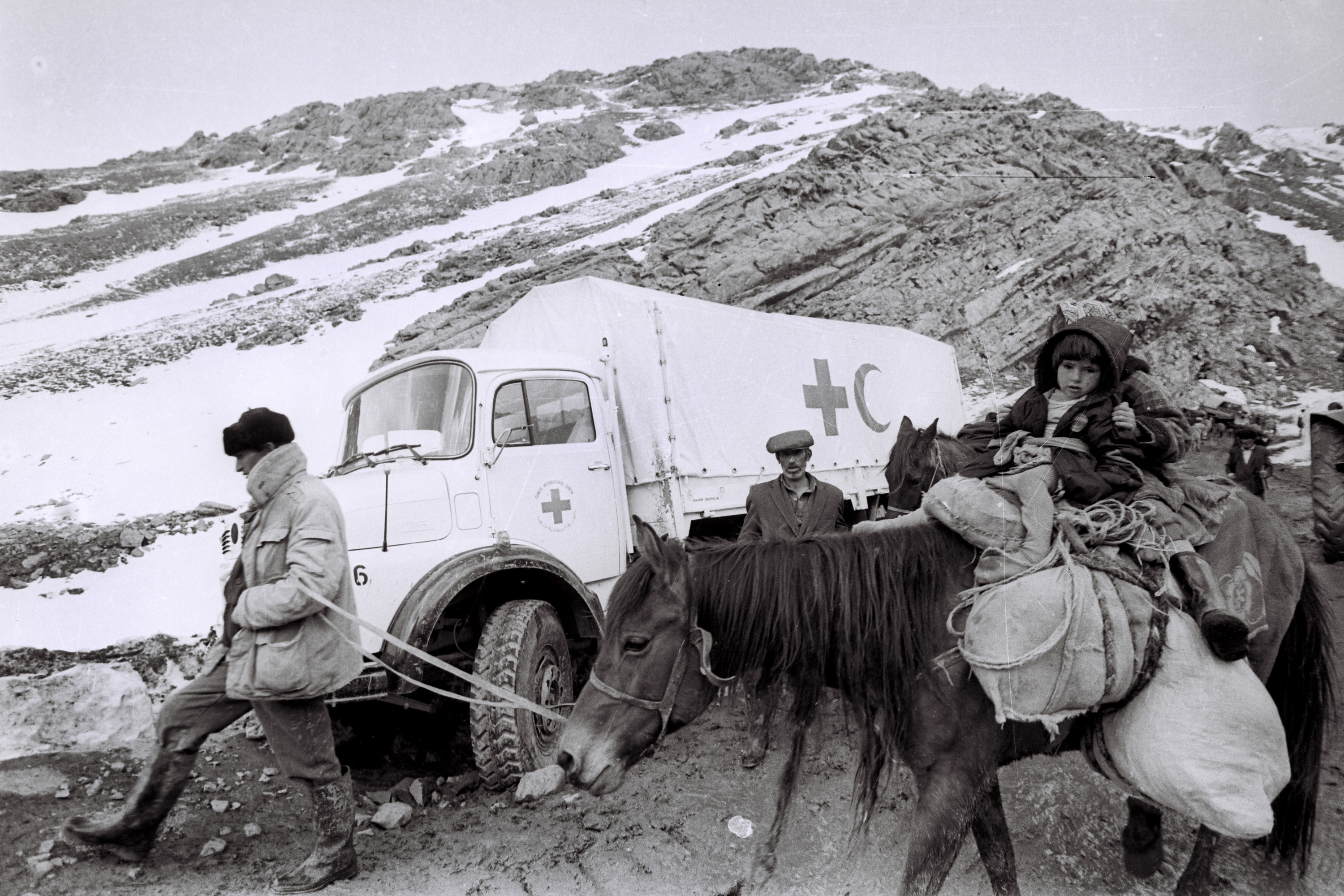

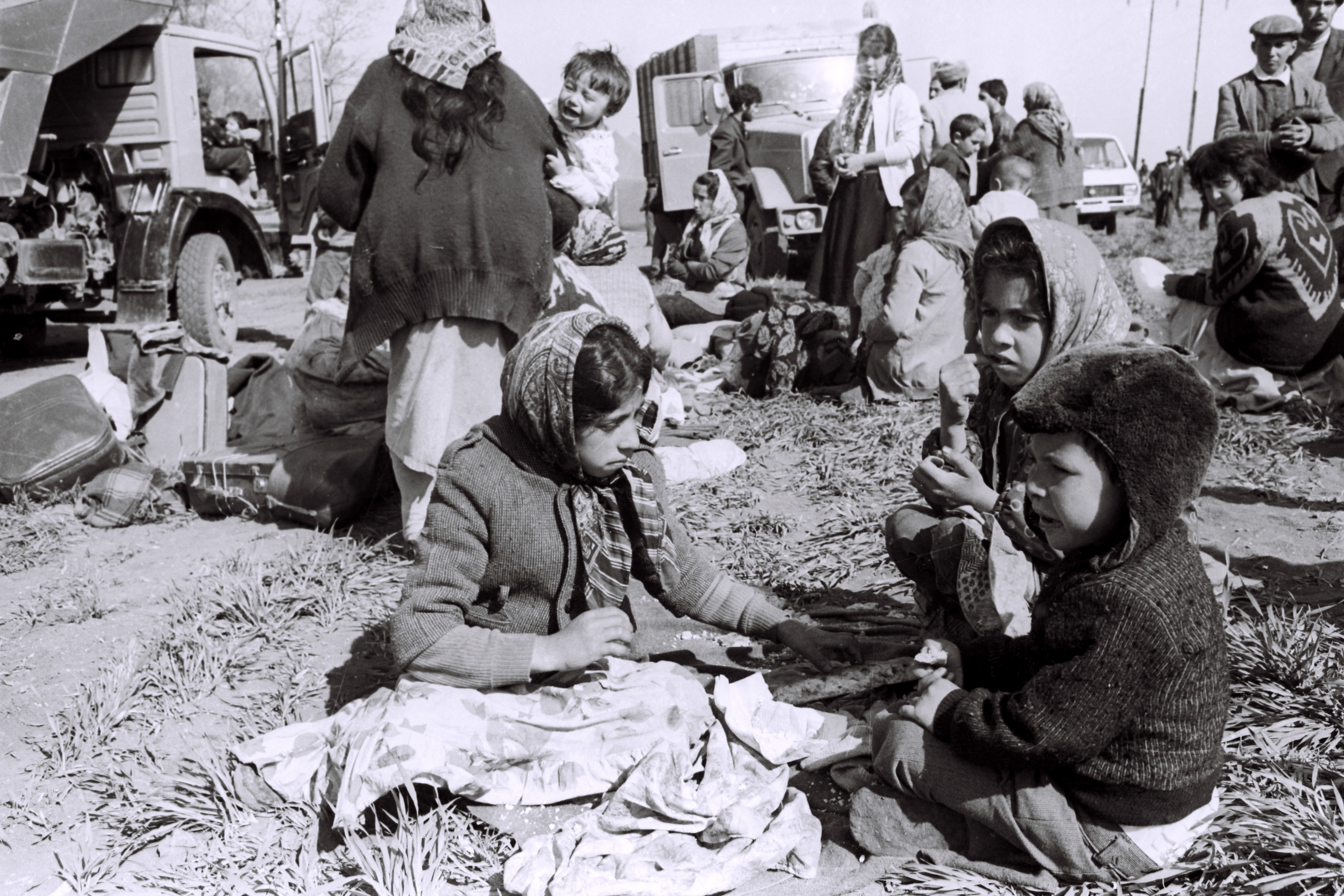

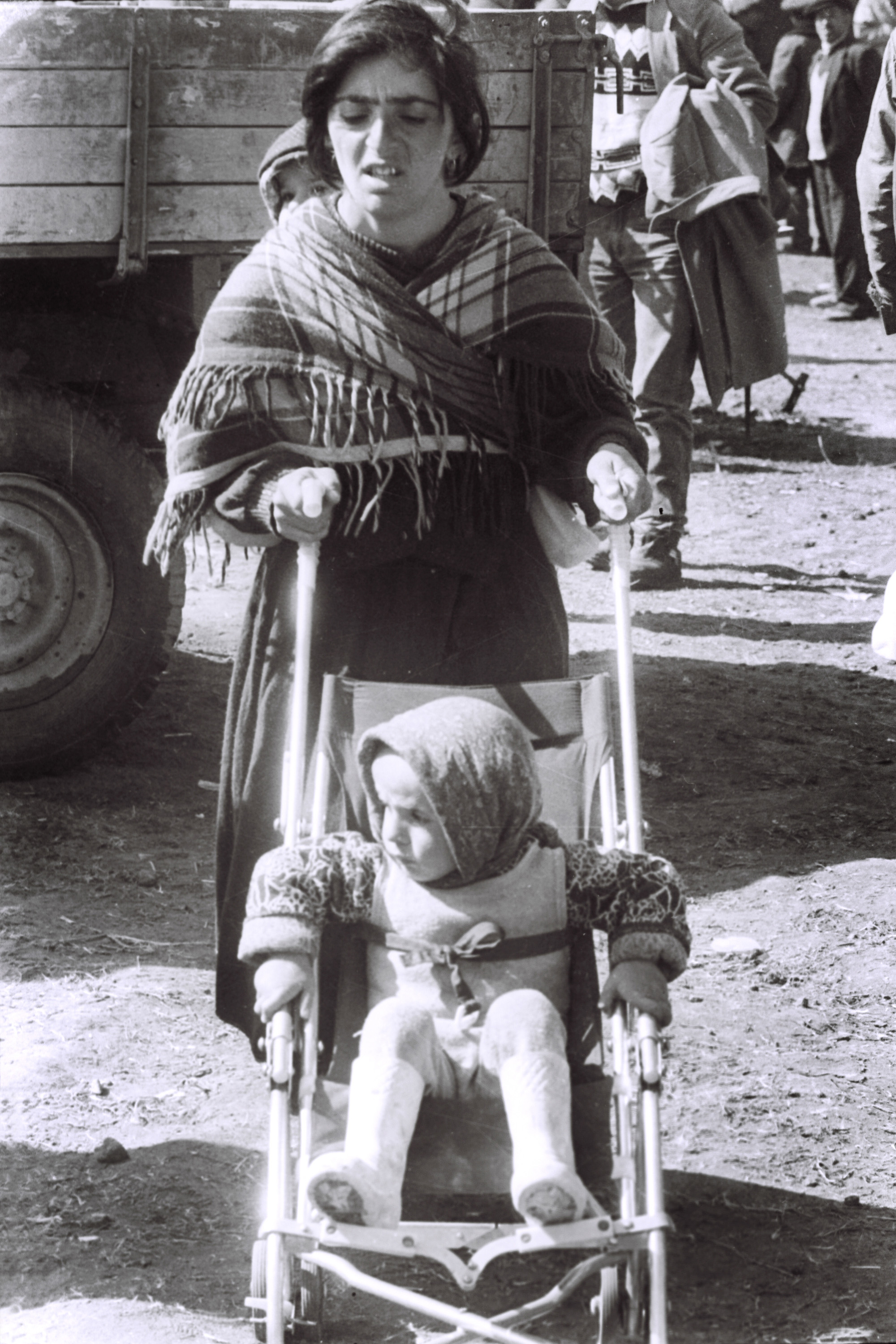

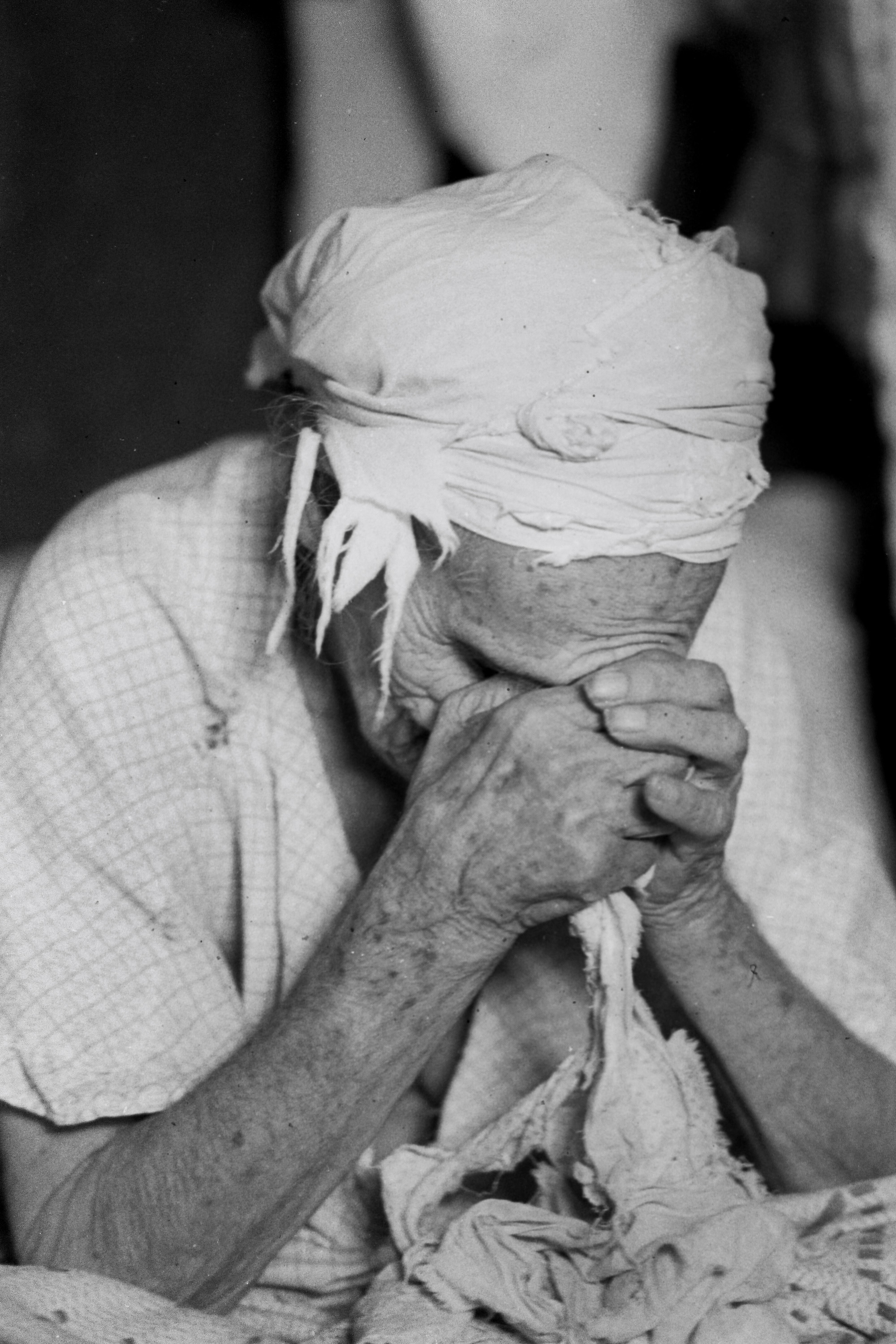

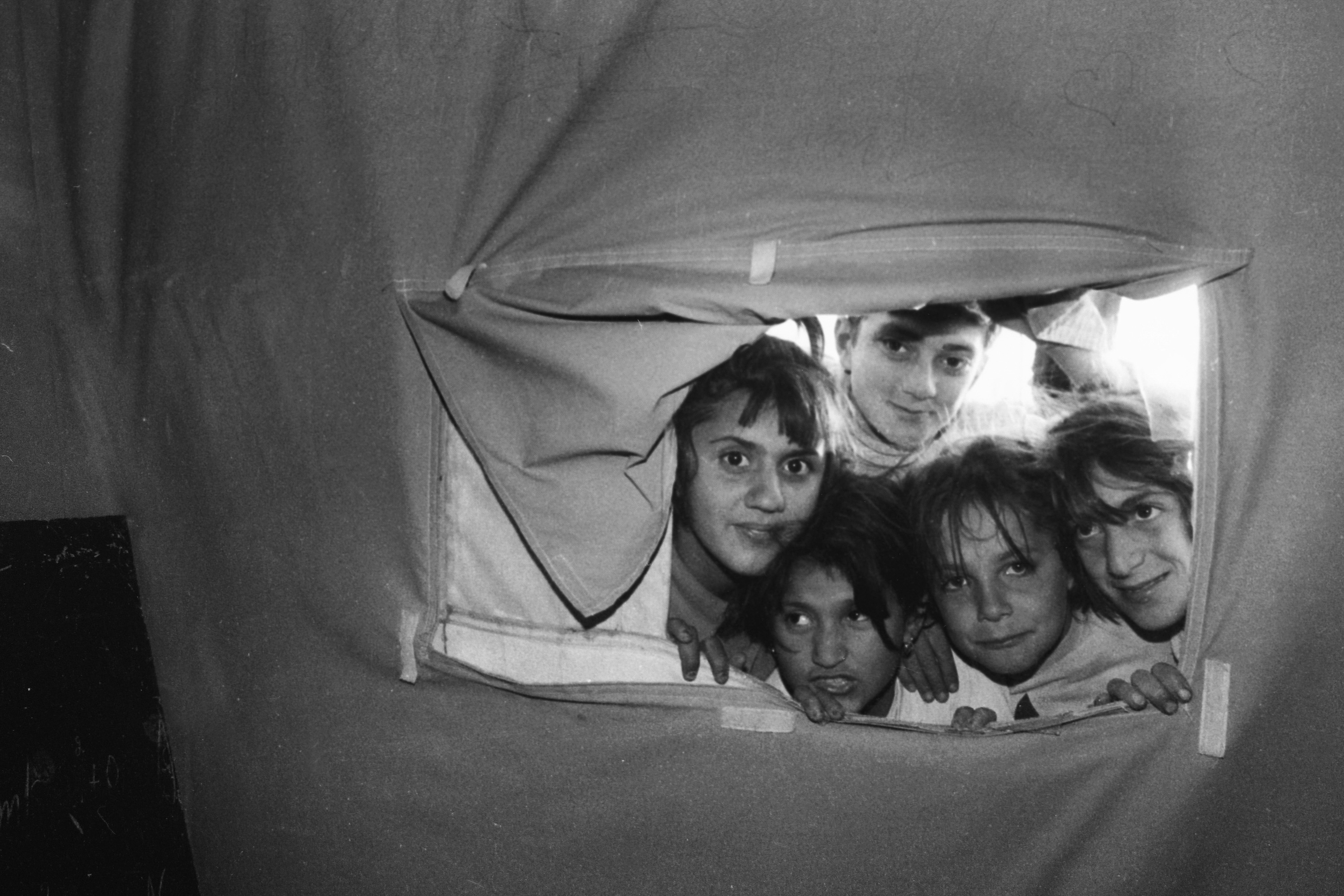

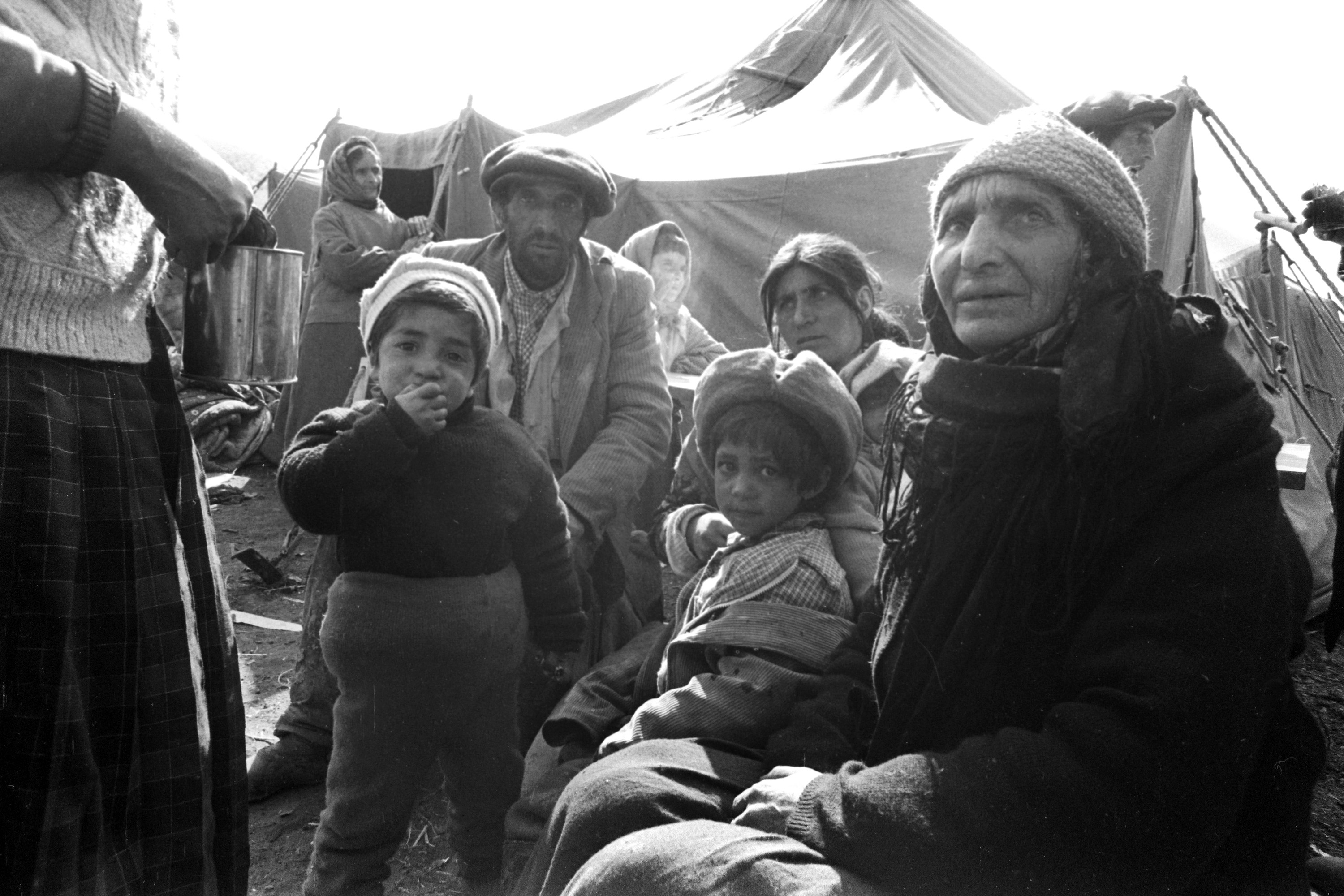

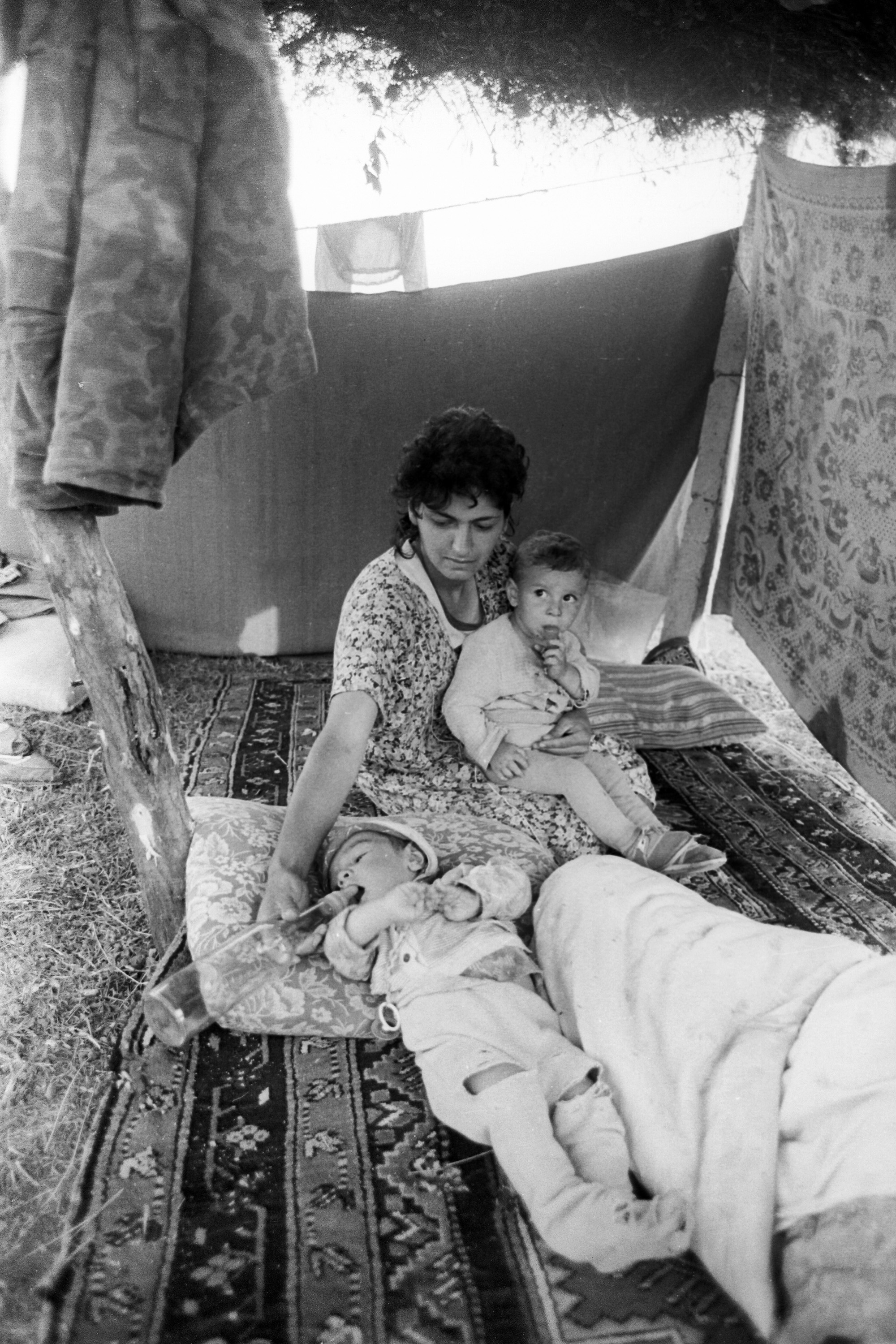

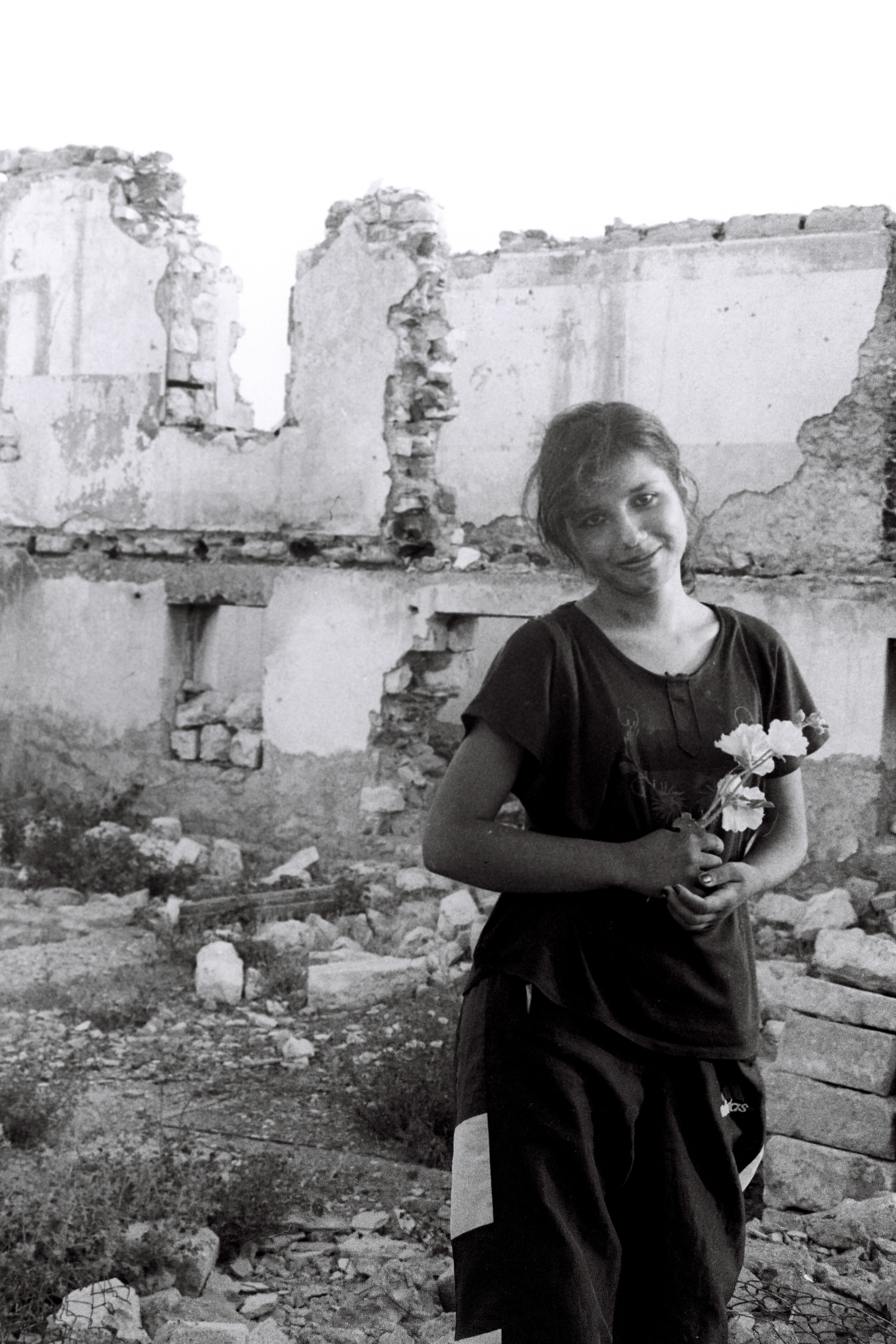

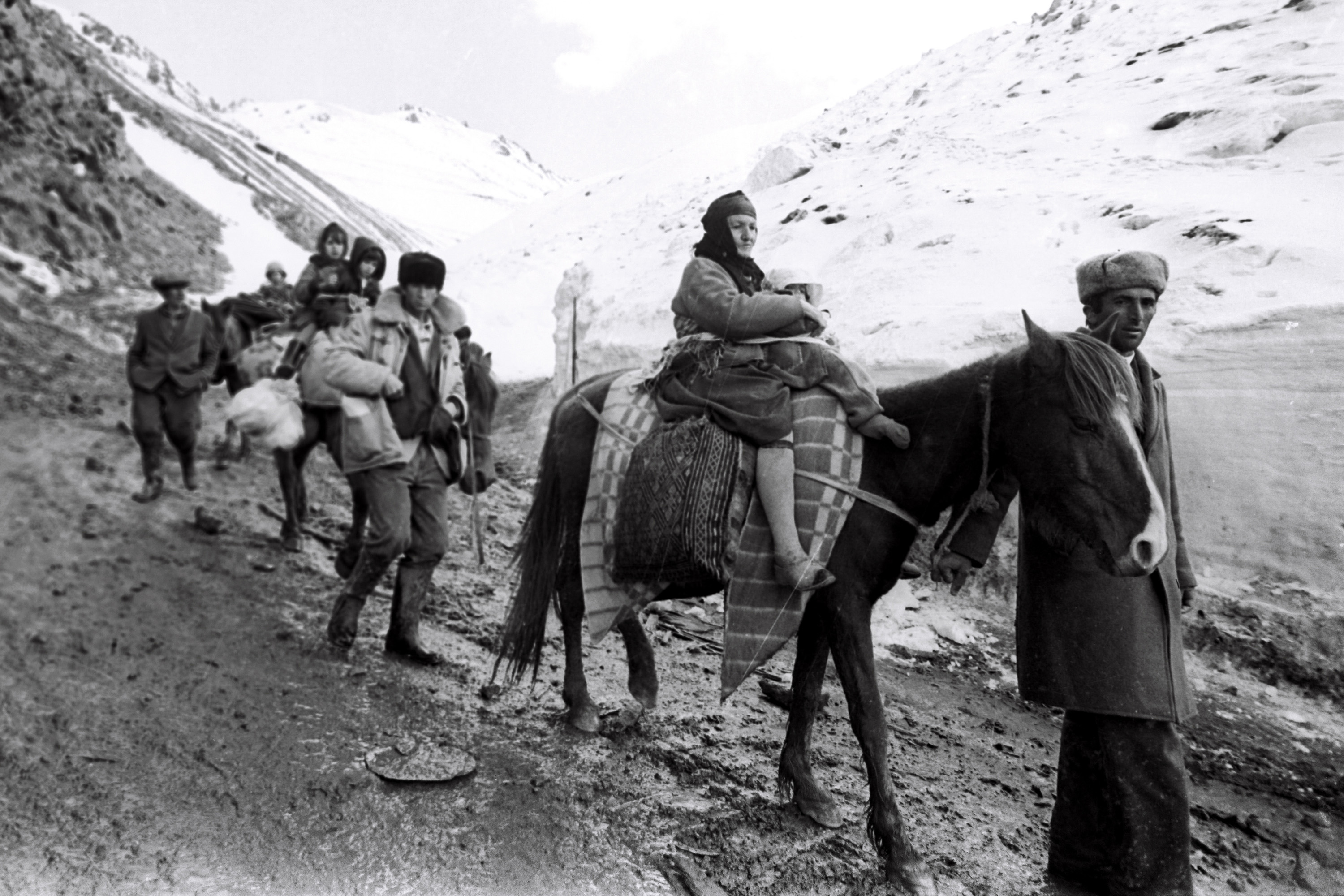

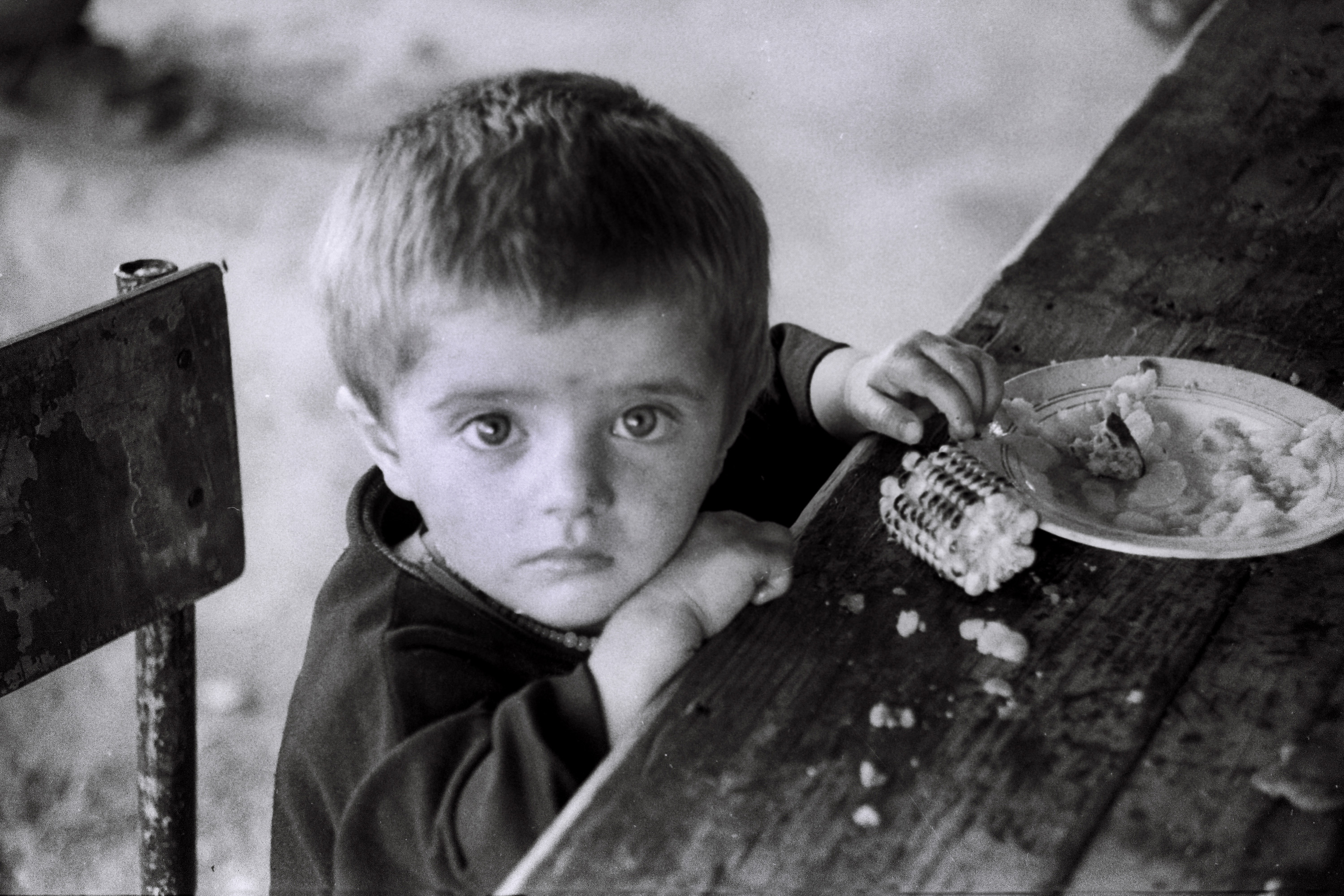

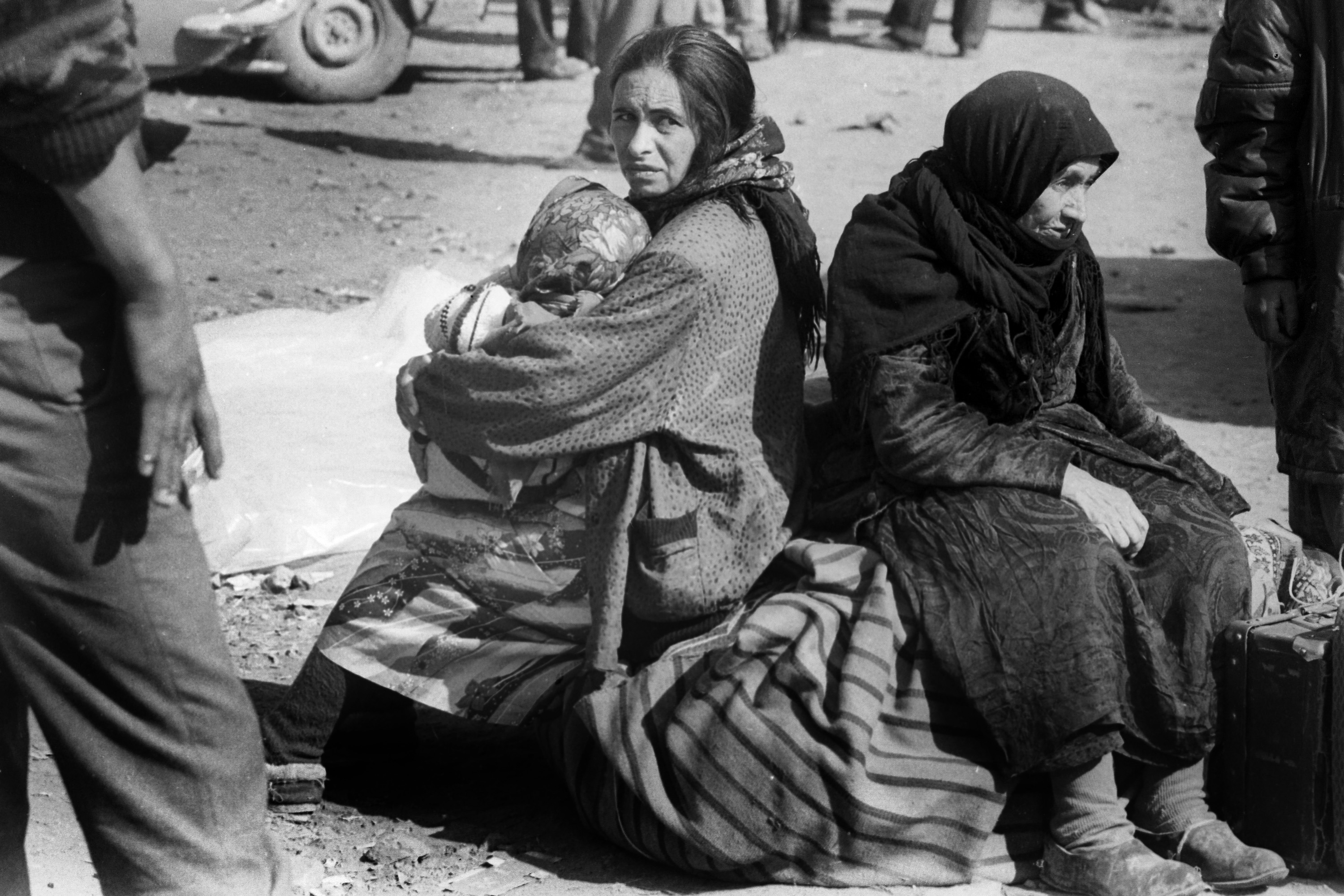
