= Gugark pogrom =

Pogrom directed against ethnic Azerbaijanis within the Armenia SSR

- Part of the Nagorno-Karabakh conflict
- Location: Gugark District, Armenian SSR, Soviet Union
- Date: March – December 1988 (9 months)
- Target: Local Azerbaijani population
- Attack type: Murder, arson, pogrom
- Deaths: 11 (per official Soviet data); 21 (per Arif Yunusov)
- Perpetrators: Local Armenians and Armenian refugees from Azerbaijan
- Motive: A reaction to similar pogroms of Armenians in Azerbaijan

The Gugark pogrom was a pogrom directed against the Azerbaijani minority of the Gugark District (now a part of the Lori Province) in the Armenian SSR, then part of the Soviet Union.

The pogrom of Azerbaijanis in Gugark in March 1988 followed the earlier pogrom of Armenians in Sumgait in the end of February 1988. The persecution of the Azerbaijanis continued until virtually all of them fled the region. The pogrom was one of the acts of ethnic violence in the context of the Nagorno-Karabakh conflict, which would later erupt into a war.

Azerbaijani sources label the pogrom as a "massacre" (Azerbaijani: Quqark qırğını/qətliamı).

== Background ==
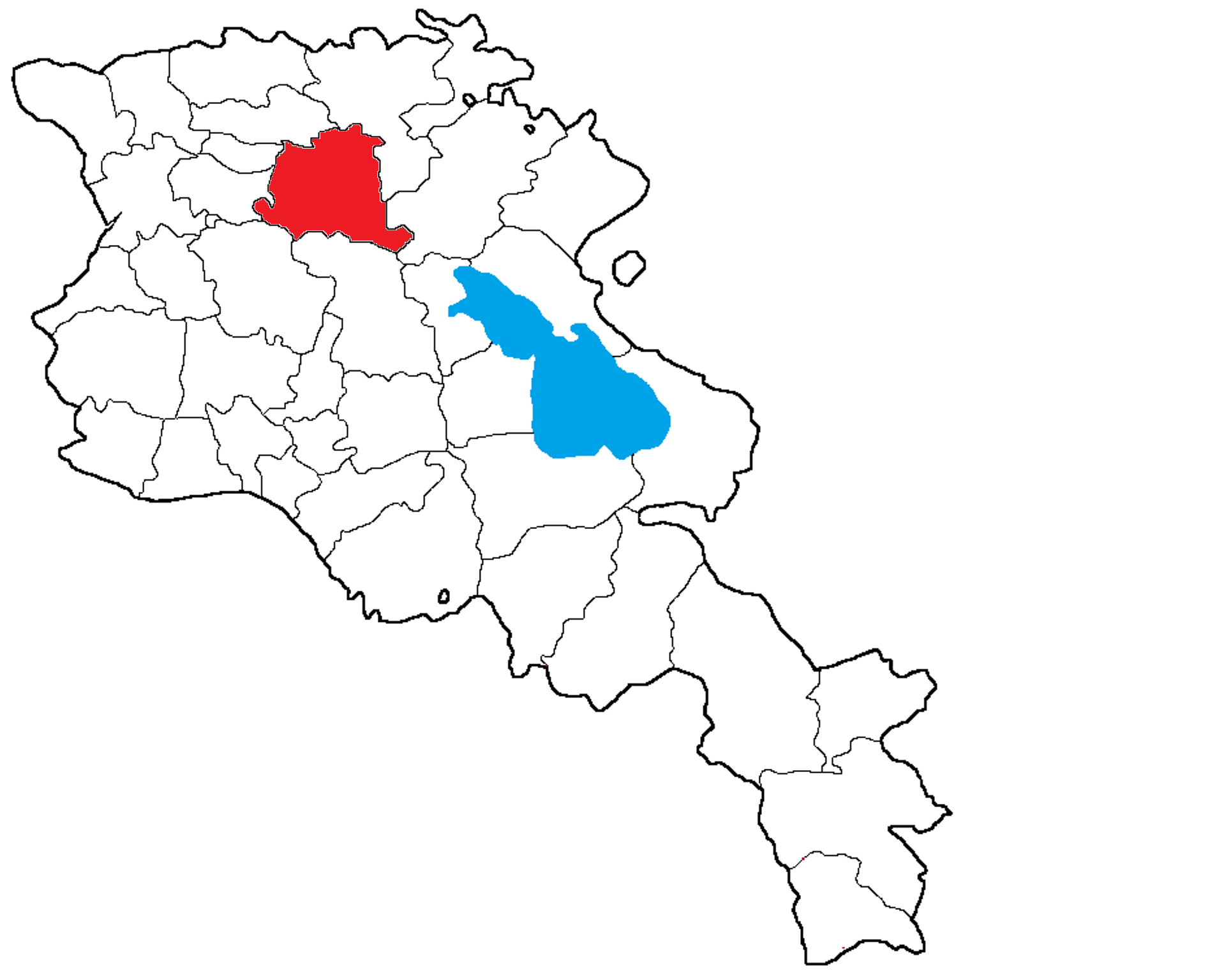
Location of Gugark District within the Armenian SSR.

Gugark District, called Boyuk Garakilsa (Azerbaijani: Böyük Qarakilsə, lit. 'Big Black Church') by its Azerbaijani inhabitants, was one of the districts of the Armenian SSR, then part of the Soviet Union. There were ethnic Azerbaijanis living compactly in this area. Following the dissolution of the Soviet Union, the district became part of the independent Armenia, replaced with the Lori Province.

Following the Kirovabad pogrom, Armenian refugees from Ganja poured into Gugark district via Georgia. The tensions between the ethnic Armenians and Azerbaijanis in Armenia were high, as both were afraid of an attack from the other side.

== Pogrom ==
The ethnic confrontation between Armenians and Azerbaijanis started in March 1988. Armenians attacked Azerbaijani houses, while the local authorities recorded beatings and robberies of Azerbaijanis by Armenians, including at their workplaces. Armenians beat Azerbaijani traders in the marketplace and stole their produce.

Violence and discrimination against the Azerbaijanis flared up throughout the Armenian SSR in November 1988. Azerbaijanis were fired from different organizations and factories in the region. The bulk of those killed in the violence were in the northern territories of the country, including the Gugark District. The local Armenians attacked and in some cases killed local Azerbaijanis. The Karabakh Committee, to reduce the possibility of provocations, guarded the city at night, but could not fully protect its inhabitants. The Armenian authorities tried to protect the local Azerbaijanis, putting soldiers and police officers on the roads leading to Azerbaijani-inhabited villages. When the local Azerbaijanis were eventually escorted out of the region by the authorities, it is reported that Armenians attacked the convoys of fleeing Azerbaijanis.

The officially reported number of Azerbaijanis killed in Gugark village was eleven. According to Armenian journalist Mane Papyan, seven Azerbaijanis were killed in Vanadzor, while the rest were persecuted and exiled. According to Azerbaijani historian and publicist Arif Yunus, 21 Azerbaijanis were killed in Gugark. Yunus' list was re-released by the embassy of Azerbaijan in the United Kingdom in 2008. A former chairman of a collective farm in the region, Stepan Ayvazyan stated that the culprits had burnt the bodies of the dead in Shahumyan to prevent their identification.

== Government reaction ==
The Armenian radio reported that the Communist Party leader and head of the parliament in the Gugark area had shown "political short-sightedness", and that the Soviet government had relieved them of their duties. Following this, a group of around 100 experts arrived from Moscow to investigate the killings. The USSR Prosecutor General's Office began criminal proceedings into the killings, but the perpetrators were never found, and the criminal case was never solved. The first Prosecutor General of Azerbaijan, Ismat Gayibov, criticized Soviet authorities for not paying enough attention to the events, since only four people had been arrested for the killings. According to the former prosecutor of Vanadzor, Grigori Shahverdyan, the attacks were organised by small groups of young Armenians. The chairwoman of the Azerbaijani National Committee of the International Helsinki Federation for Human Rights, Arzu Abdulayeva, stated that the Azerbaijani public knew nothing about the pogrom of Azerbaijanis in Gugark for a long time beyond rumours because of a cover-up.

== Aftermath ==
In 1989, many Azerbaijanis originally from Gugark returned to sell their apartments or to receive compensation for the loss of their apartments after the Spitak earthquake. Afterwards they all left their homes.

Azerbaijani author Arif Yunus claims the word "Gugark" has become a household word for the Azerbaijanis, as "Sumgait" has for the Armenians. The chairwoman of the Azerbaijani National Committee of the International Helsinki Federation for Human Rights, Arzu Abdulayeva, stated that the events in Sumgait were very similar to what happened in Gugark.

=== In literature ===
The Gugark pogrom was one of the main settings of the controversial novel Gugark by Azerbaijani writer Seymur Baycan. The novel surrounded the love story of an Azerbaijani man named Seymur and an Armenian woman named Anoush amid pogrom in Baku and Gugark. Baycan avoided harsh criticism in Azerbaijan by only mentioning the expulsion of Armenians but not the harassment or violence against Armenians. The novel was generally well received in Azerbaijan despite its controversial message of peace. In contrast, Akram Aylisli, the author of the similar work Stone Dreams describing the events of the Baku and Sumgait pogroms, was condemned in Azerbaijan and persecuted by Azerbaijani authorities. Critics such as Mikail Mamedov, comparing Gugark to Stone Dreams, criticized Gugark for not being well written and therefore lacking any powerful message.

== See also ==
- Deportation of Azerbaijanis from Armenia
