= Gugark (village) =

Gugark Գուգարք
- Location within Armenia
- Coordinates: 40°48′26″N 44°32′17″E
- Country: Armenia
- Marz (Province): Lori
- Elevation: 1,325 m (4,347 ft)

Population (2011)
  - Total: 4,278
- Time zone: UTC+4 ( )
  - Summer (DST): UTC+5

Gugark (Armenian: Գուգարք), formerly known as Meghrut, is a major village in the Lori Province of Armenia, named for the province of Gugark in Greater Armenia. It borders with Vanadzor, being 2 km south-east, and is situated along the Debed River. The village is 1,325 meters above sea level. It was renamed from Meghrut to Gugark on May 25, 1983.

== Demographics ==
Rural residents of the village have immigrated to Gugark from villages in the Nagorno-Karabakh and Tavush regions.

Years	1831	1873	1897	1919	1926	1926	1939	1959	1970	1979	2001	2004	2011
Pop.	105	643	1125	1360	1507	1600	1943	1901	2236	3206	5665	5594	4278

== Economy ==
Gugark occupies an area of 2158 hectares, of which 195 ha is used as arable land, 240 hectares of meadows, 700 hectares of pasture and 20 hectares of fruit gardens.

The population produces wheat, barley, potatoes, cabbage, melons and gourds. Livestock owners produce milk, meat, wool, eggs, and honey.

== Historical Sites ==
The town is home to St. Sarkis Church, built in the 19th century.

== NGOs ==
In 2013, the village had one kindergartens which is attended by 35 children, and two high schools, with 842 students.

Gugark also has a House of Culture, with a sports school and a music school. There is a library, which has 23 books.

== Gallery ==
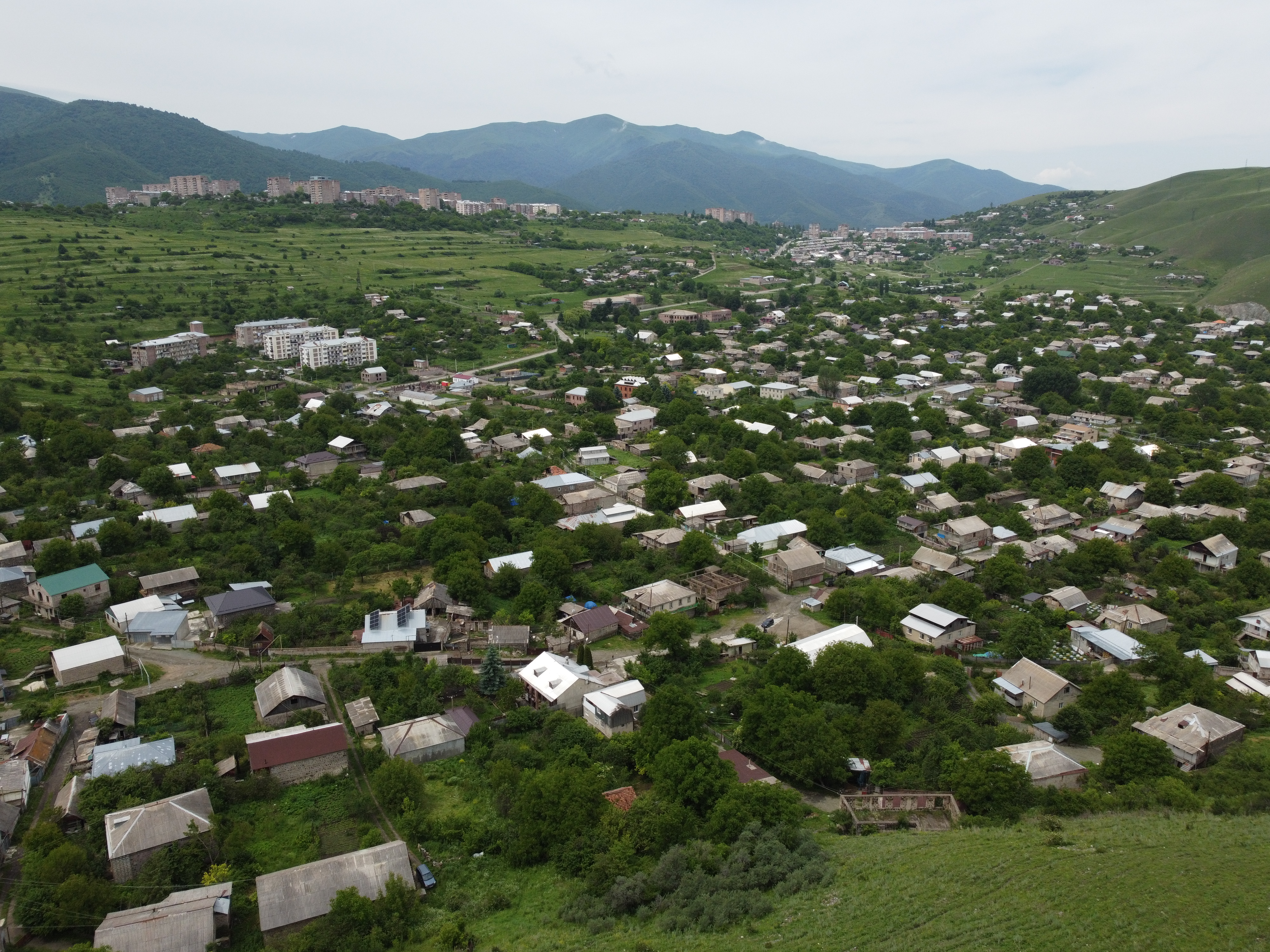
Gugark, aerial view from east

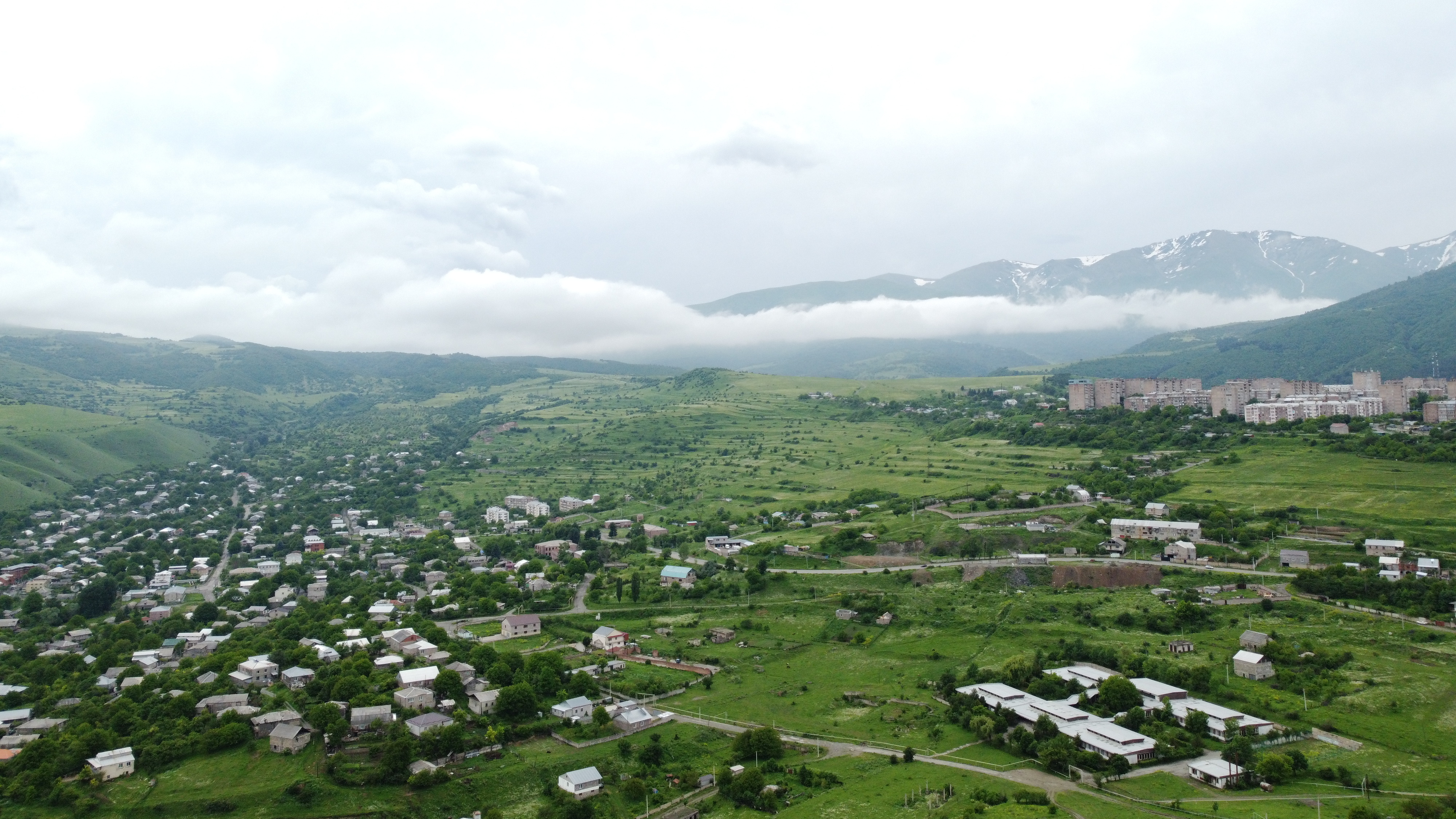
Gugark, Armenia, aerial view, June

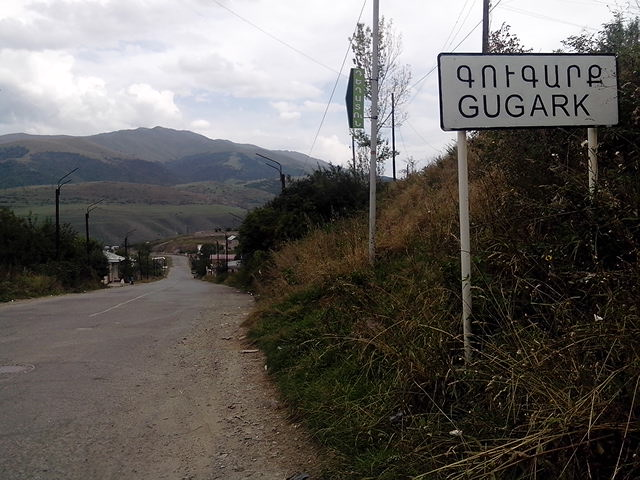
Entrance to Gugark

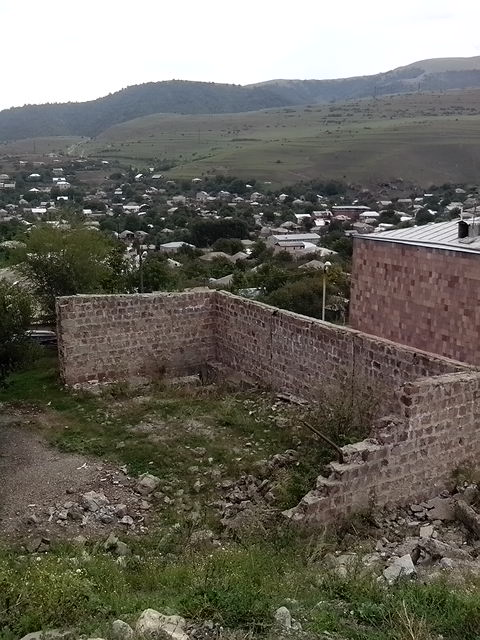
A view of Gugark town

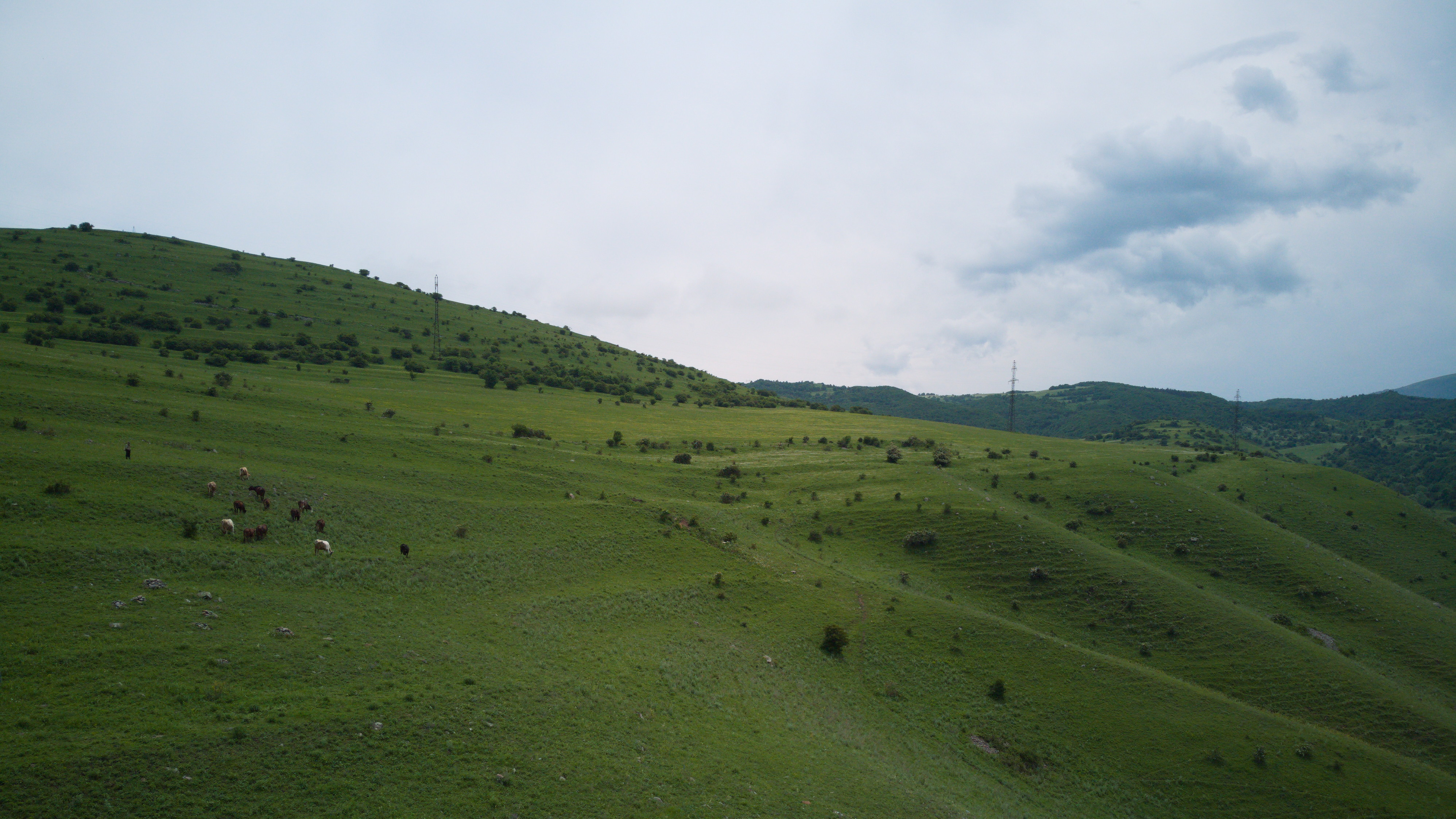
Cows grazing on the hills near Gugark

== See also ==
- Gugark pogrom
