= Seymur Baycan =

Azerbaijani writer

- Born: 22 April 1976 (age 50); Fuzuli, Azerbaijan
- Education: Department of Public Administration
- Alma mater: Qafqaz University
- Occupations: Journalist and writer
- Writing career
- Period: 2000 – present
- Notable work: Quqark (novel)
- Notable awards: Media Key

Seymur Baycan (Azerbaijani: Seymur Baycan, Seymur XXX) – an Azerbaijani writer, publicist, columnist.

== Life ==
Seymur Baycan was born in 1976, in Fizuli, Azerbaijan. He graduated from the military school named after Jamshid Nakhchivanski. He went on to study at Qafqaz University, Department of Public Administration. He left his education and started his literary career. His short stories have been published in Russian, Georgian, Armenian, Ukrainian and Kazakh languages. He created the novel-skeleton in world literature. His best-known works include 18.6 cm, Meat and meat products and Gugark. In different years he published essays and columns in newspapers Milli yol, Reyting, Daily Azerbaijan, etc. He participated in several regional projects and delivered lectures on cultural topics. Seymur Baycan was awarded with Media Key for his essay The Sunday in Paradise. He won the writing competition organized by Elmar Huseynov Foundation.

== Bibliography ==
- Nontraditional intercourse, 2003;
- Sparrows, 2003;
- Execution Day, 2004;
- Meat and meat products, 2005;
- 18, 6 cm, (novel), 2007;
- Bridge builders, (novel), 2008;
- Gugark, (novel), 2011;
- My struggle I (collection of articles) 2013;
- Heart of Mother, (novel), 2013
- My struggle II, (collection of articles), 2014;
- The Happiest Day of My Life, (short stories), 2014;
- Articles published in Kulis, (collection of articles), 2014;
- My struggle III, (collection of articles), 2015;
- Return of unnamed dog, (novel), 2015;
- My struggle IV, (collection of articles), 2016;
- Fargana, (novel), 2016;
