= Syunik Province =

Province of Armenia

Syunik Սյունիք
- Province
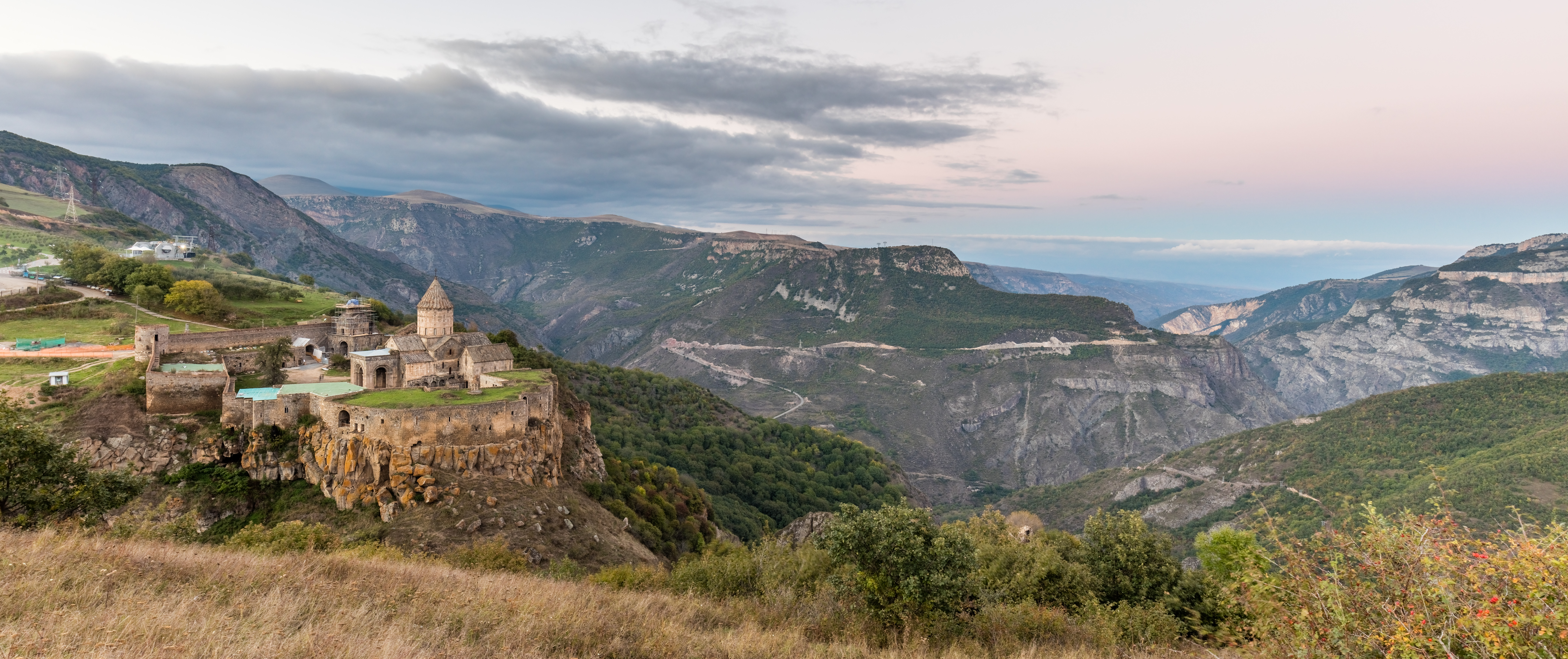
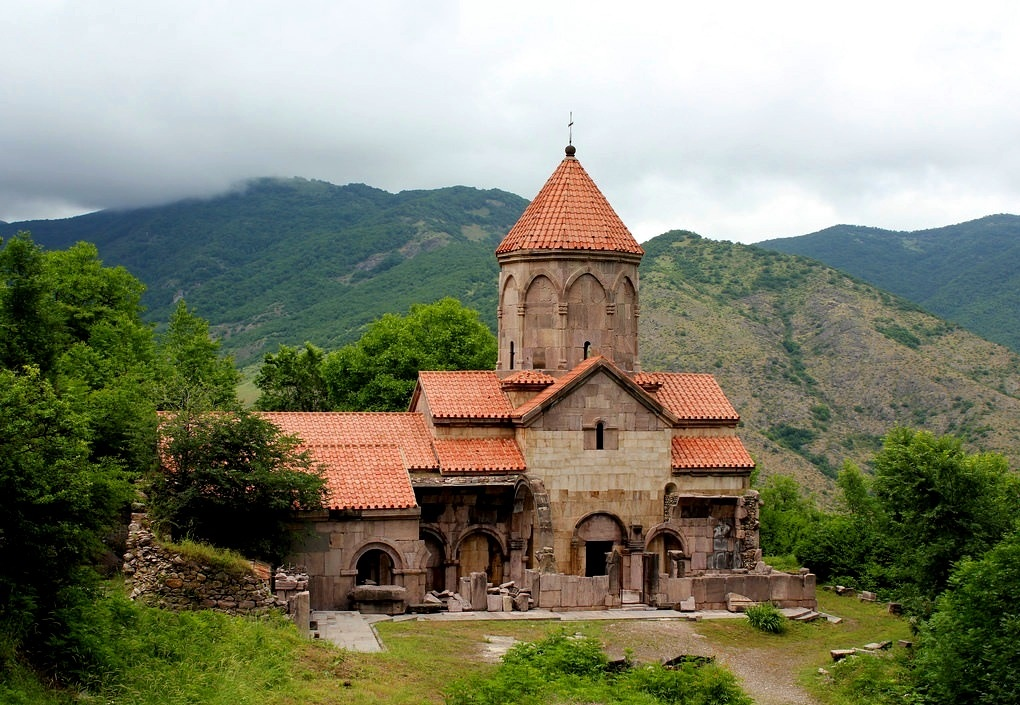
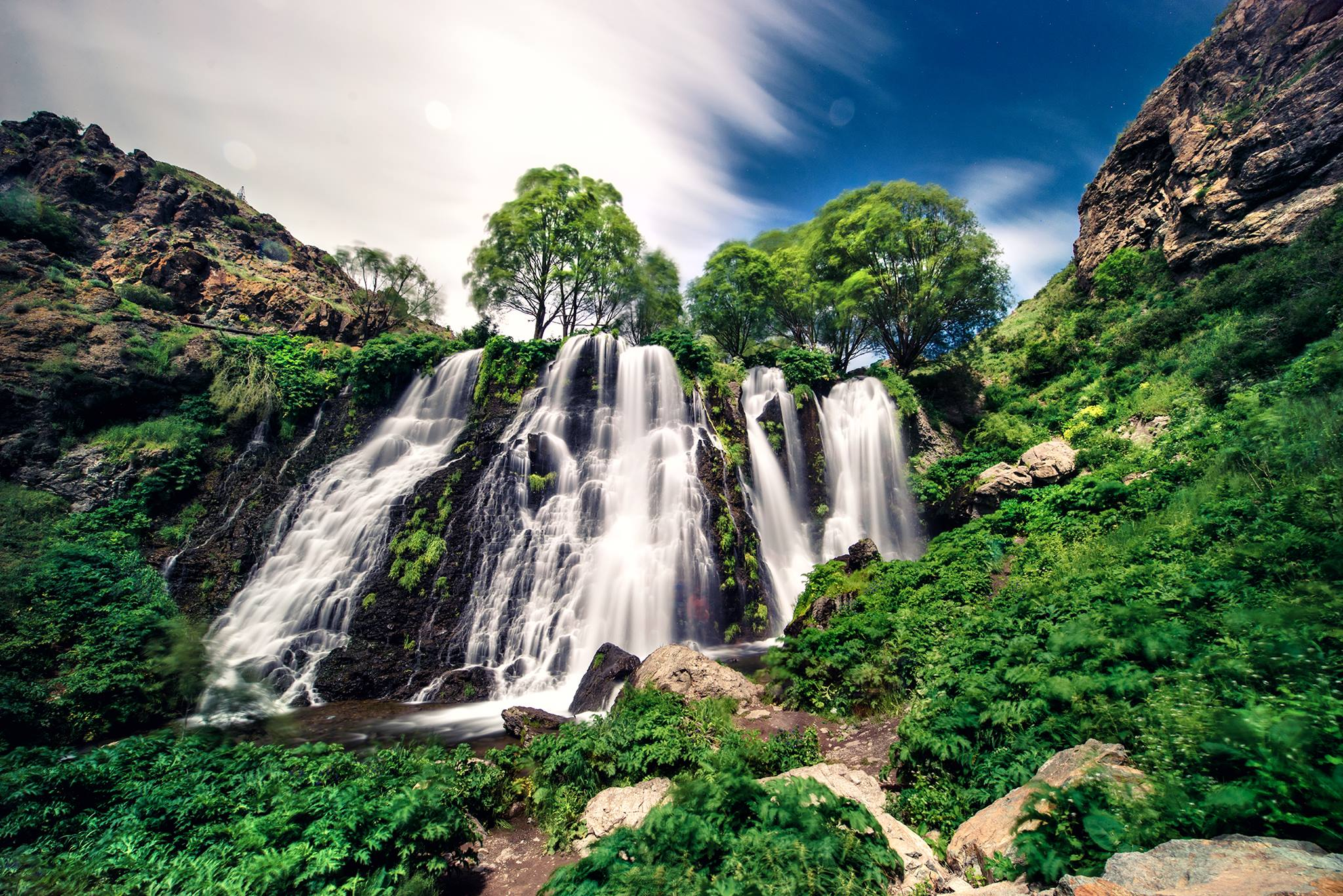
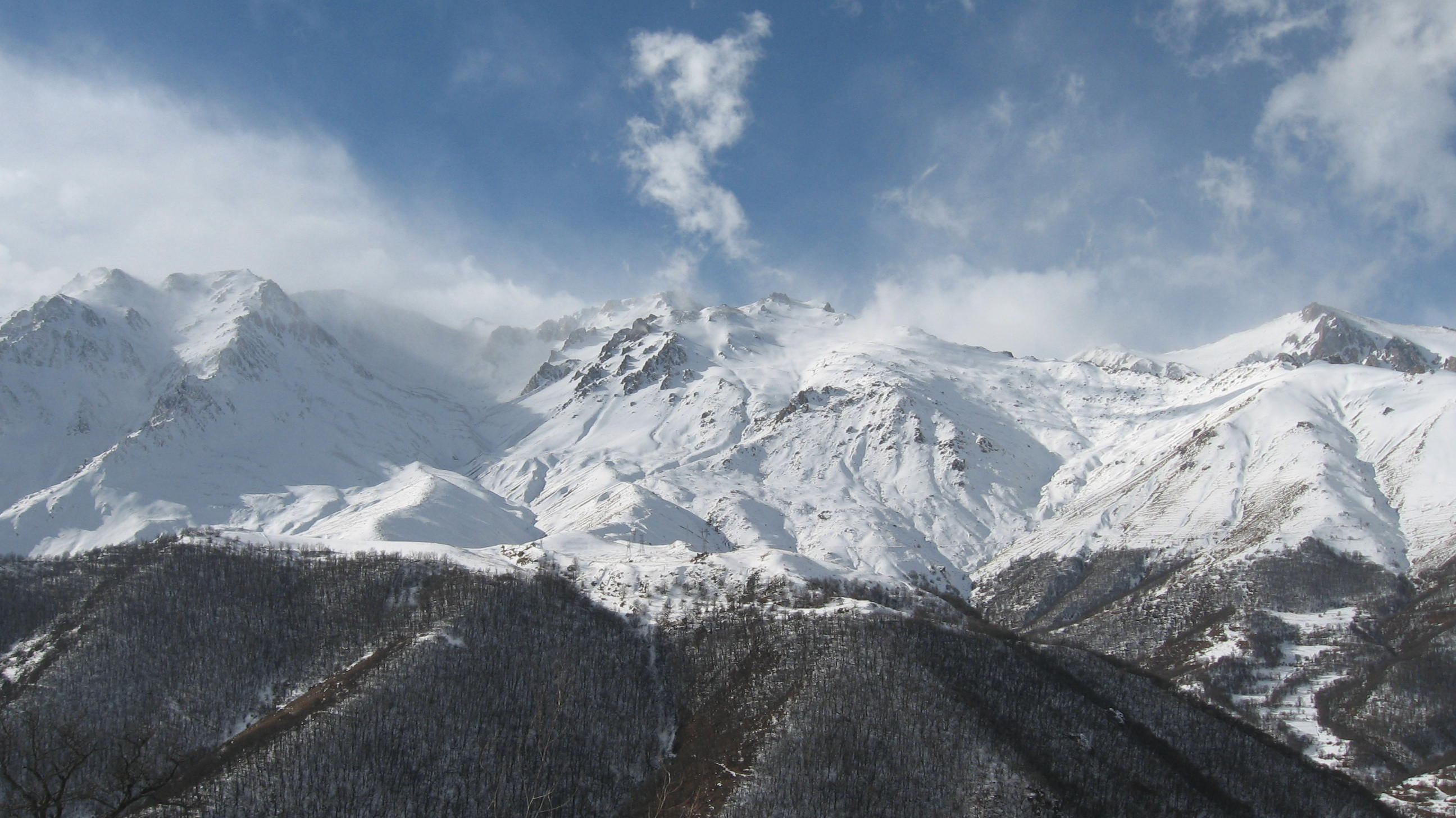
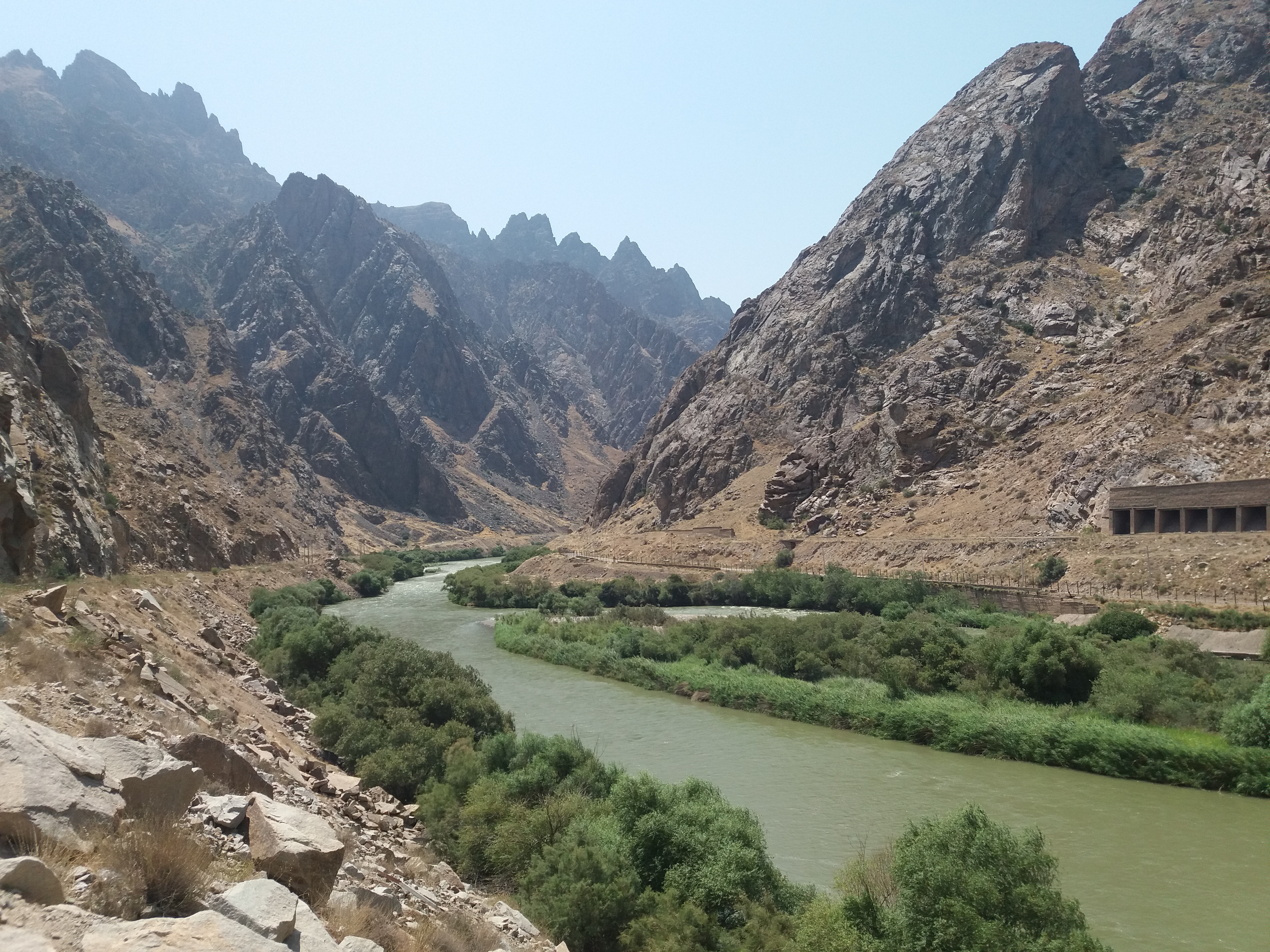
- From the top to bottom-right: View of Tatev Monastery, Vahanavank Monastery, Shaki Waterfall, Arevik National Park, Aras River on the border with Iran

- Location of Syunik within Armenia
- Coordinates: 39°15′N 46°15′E
- Country: Armenia
- Capital and largest city: Kapan

Government
  - Governor: Robert Ghukasyan

Area
  - Total: 4,506 km^{2} (1,740 sq mi)
  - Rank: 2nd
- Highest elevation: 3,904 m (12,808 ft)
- Lowest elevation: 380 m (1,250 ft)

Population (2022)
  - Total: 114,488
  - Rank: 10th
  - Density: 25.41/km^{2} (65.81/sq mi)

GDP
  - Total: ֏ 335.238 billion (US$ 695 million)
  - Per capita: ֏ 2,417,001 (US$ 5,010)
- Time zone: AMT (UTC+04)
- Postal code: 3201–3519
- ISO 3166 code: AM-SU
- FIPS 10-4: AM08
- HDI (2022): 0.779 high · 5th
- Website: Official website

Syunik (Armenian: Սյունիք, (Note: Classical spelling: Սիւնիք) pronounced [sjuˈnikʰ]) is the southernmost province of Armenia. It is bordered by the Vayots Dzor Province to the north, Azerbaijan's Nakhchivan Autonomous Republic exclave to the west, Azerbaijan to the east, and Iran to the south. Its capital and largest city is the town of Kapan. The Statistical Committee of Armenia reported its population was 114,488 in the 2022 census, down from 141,771 at the 2011 census and 152,684 at the 2001 census.

== Etymology ==
Syunik was one of the 15 provinces of the Kingdom of Armenia. The early Armenian historian Movses Khorenatsi connected the name of the province with Sisak, a descendant of the legendary Armenian patriarch Hayk and supposed progenitor of the ancient Siunia (or Syunik) dynasty, which ruled Syunik from the first century BC. However, historian Robert Hewsen considered Sisak to be a later eponym. Historian Armen Petrosyan suggested that Syunik is derived from name of the Urartian sun god Shivini/Siwini (itself a borrowing from the Hittites), noting the similarity between the names and the high number of sun-related placenames in the historical Syunik region. At various times, the region of present-day Syunik was also known by other names such as Syunia, Sisakan and Zangezur (or Zangadzor). The region of Syunik geographically was called Siounia Caucasiana in the 5-6th century by the Ravenna Cosmography.

== Geography ==
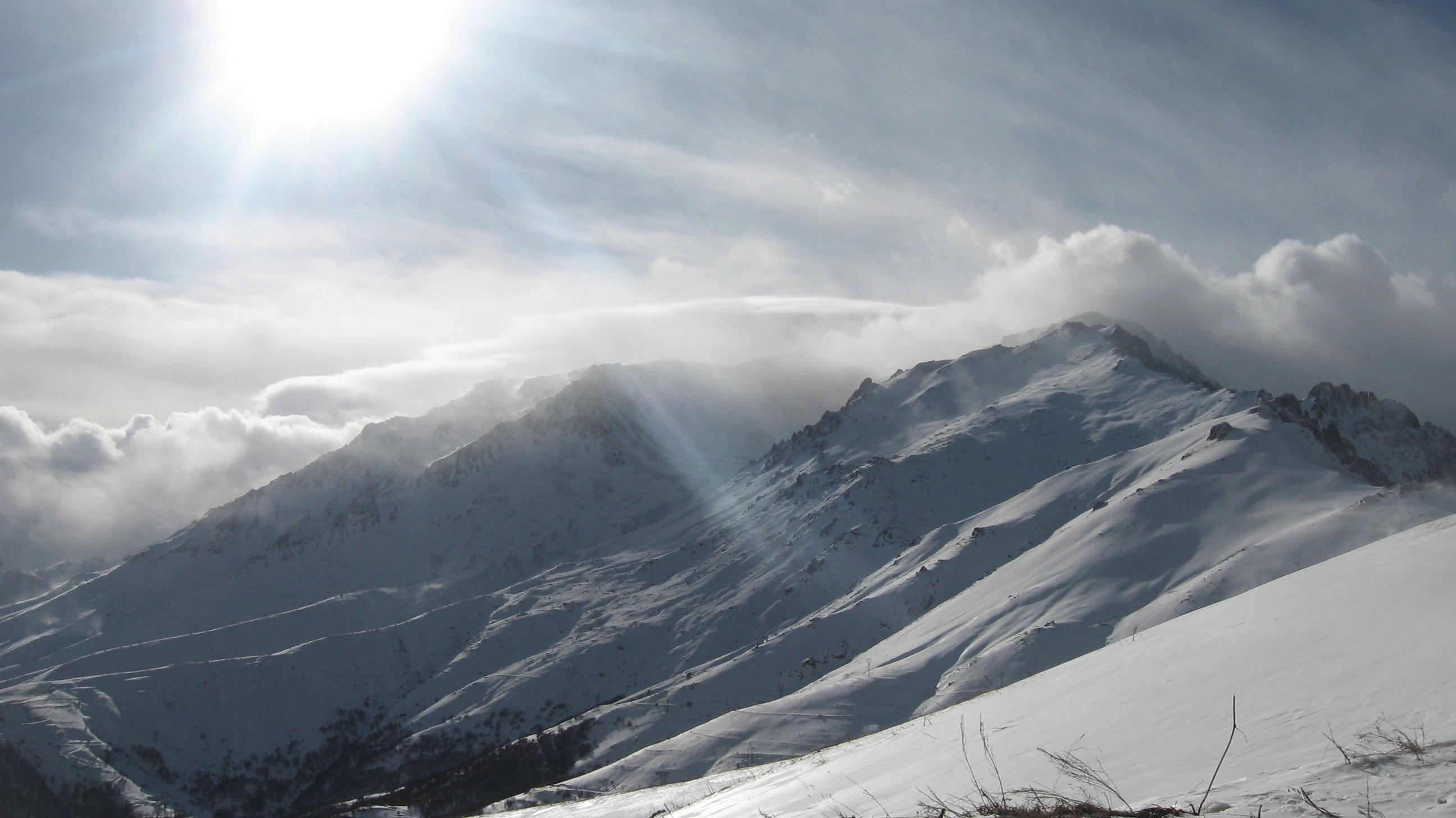
Arevik National Park at the mountains of Syunik

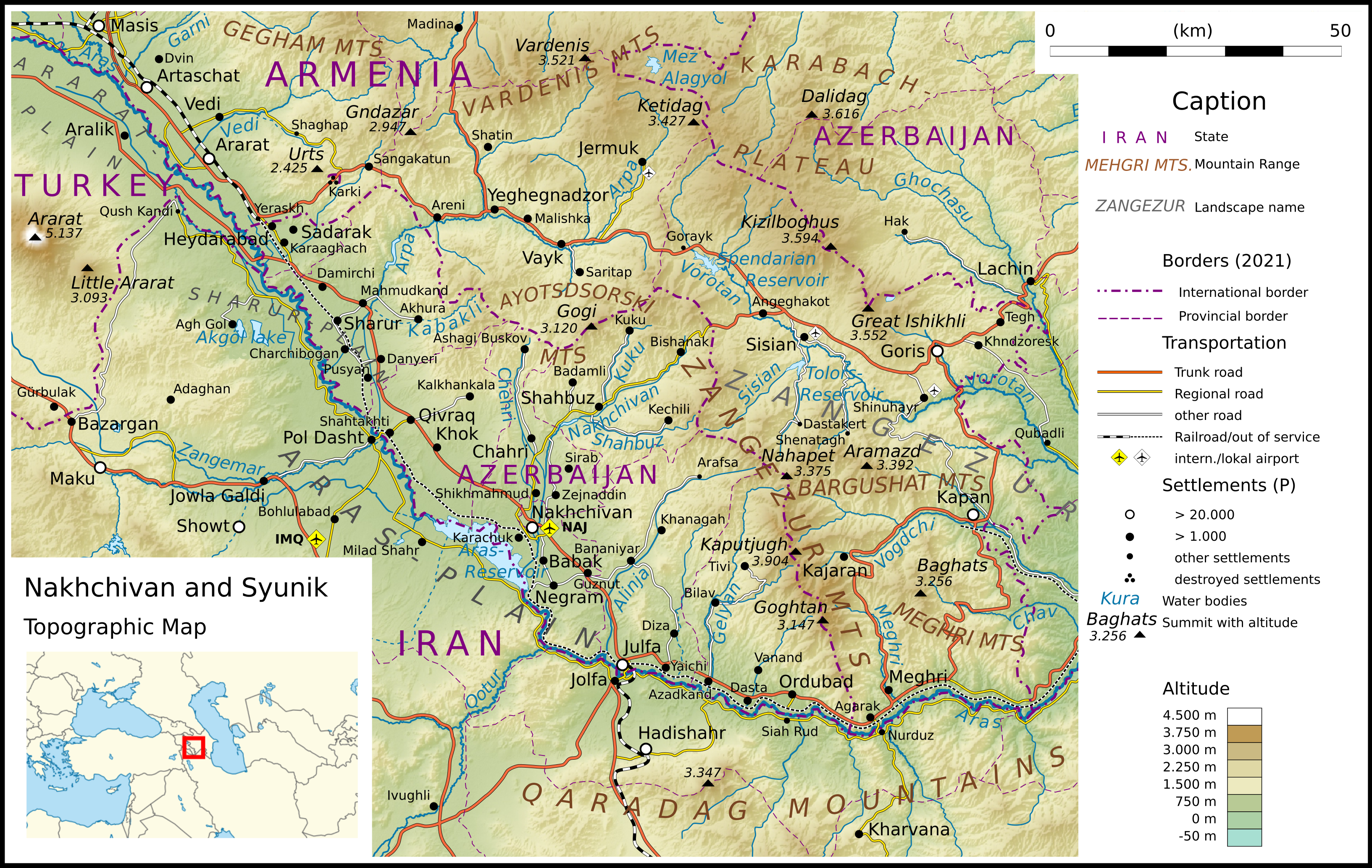
Topographic map of the region

Syunik is located between the Nakhchivan Autonomous Republic of Azerbaijan from the west, and districts of Lachin, Qubadli and Zangilan of Azerbaijan from the east. It was bordered on the east by Kashatagh Province of the Nagorno-Karabakh Republic between 1992 and 2020. The Vayots Dzor Province of Armenia forms its northern border, while Aras River at the south separates Syunik from Iran. Syunik covers an area of 4,506 km^{2} (1740 sq. mi.) (15% of total area of Armenia), making it the second-largest province in Armenia after Gegharkunik in terms of the total area.

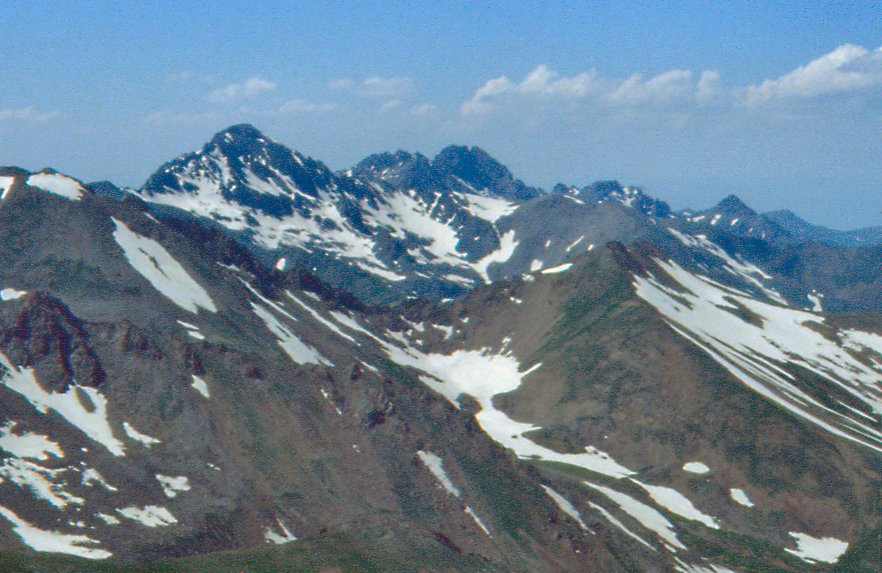
Mount Kaputjugh (3905 metres, 12,812 ft)

Historically, the current territory of the province occupies most of the historic Syunik province of Ancient Armenia.

Syunik is a mountainous region, mainly covered with thick green forests. The Zangezur Mountains occupy most of the territory of Syunik. Mount Kaputjugh with a height of 3905 meters (12,812') and Mount Gazanasar with a height of 3829 meters (12,562') are the highest peaks of the province.

Many of the forests in Syunik are protected by the government, including the Arevik National Park, the Shikahogh State Reserve, the Boghakar Sanctuary, the Goris Sanctuary, the Plane Grove Sanctuary, the Sev Lake Sanctuary, and the Zangezur Sanctuary.

Major water basins include the rivers of Vorotan, Voghji, Sisian, Meghri and Vachagan. Summer temperature can reach up to 40 °C (104 °F), although the average temperature is around 22 °C (72 °F), while in winter it may reach down to -12.5 °C (9.5 °F). Its border with Nakhchivan to the west is defined by the Zangezur Mountains.

The Meghri mountain ridge at the extreme south of Armenia used to be home to the endangered Caucasian leopard. However, only one was detected by camera trap between August 2006 and April 2007, and no signs of other leopards were found during track surveys conducted over an area of 296.9 km^{2} (114.6 sq mi). The local prey base could support 4–10 individuals, but poaching and disturbance caused by livestock breeding, gathering of edible plants and mushrooms, deforestation and human-induced wildfires are so high that they exceed the tolerance of the leopards. During surveys in 2013–2014, camera traps recorded leopards in 24 locations in southern Armenia, of which 14 are located in the Zangezur Mountains.

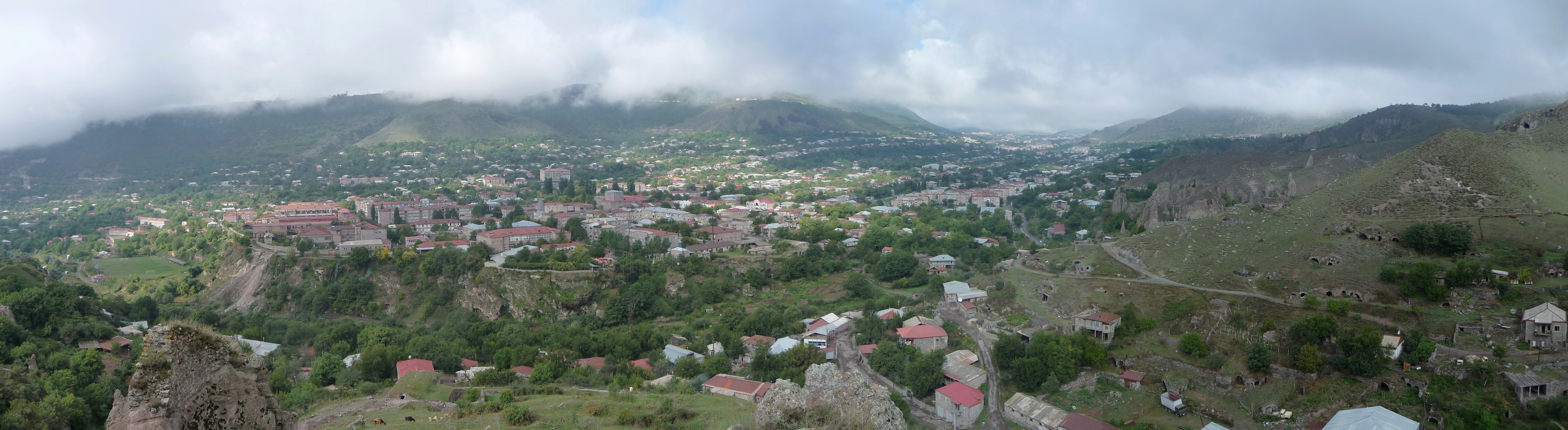
The town of Goris

== History ==
=== Kingdom of Armenia ===
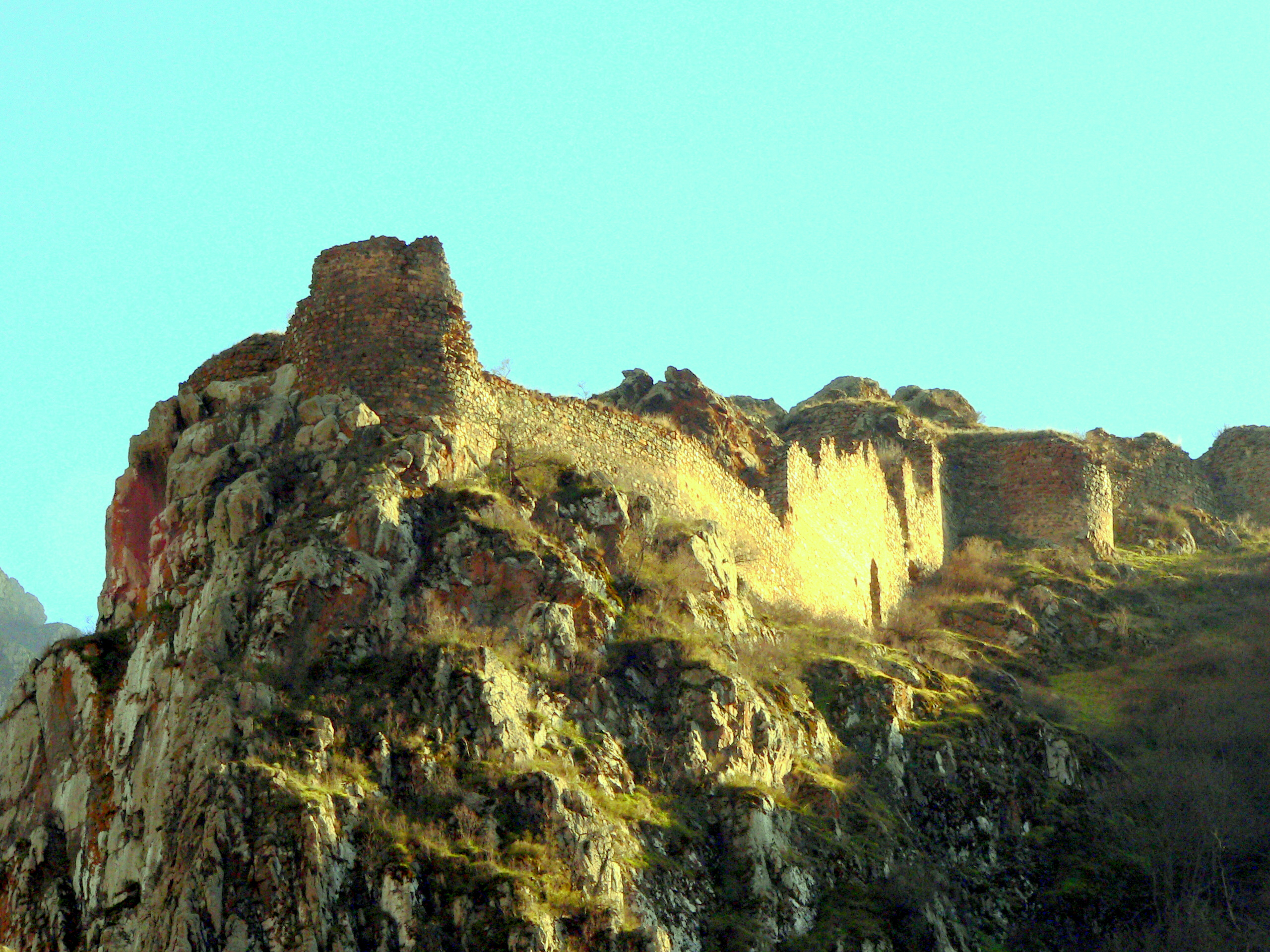
Baghaberd fortress of the 4th century

Inscriptions found in the region around Lake Sevan attributed to King Artaxias I confirm that the historic province of Syunik was part of the Artaxiad Kingdom of Armenia during the 2nd century BC.

The first dynasty to rule Syunik was the Siunia dynasty, beginning in the 1st century. The first known nakharar ruler was Valinak Siak (c. 330) and his successor was his brother Andok or Andovk (Antiochus, c. 340). In 379, Babik (Bagben) the son of Andok, was re-established as a nakharar by the Mamikonian family. Babik had a sister called Pharantzem who had married the Arsacid Prince Gnel, nephew of the Armenian King Arsaces II (Arshak II) and later married Arsaces II as her second husband. Babik's rule lasted for less than ten years and by about 386 or 387, Dara was deposed by the Sassanid Empire.

Valinak (c. 400–409) was followed by Vasak (409–452). Vasak had two sons: Babik (Bagben), Bakur and a daughter who married Vasak's successor, Varazvahan (452–472). Varazvahan's son Gelehon ruled from 470 to 477, who died in 483. Babik (Bagben) the brother of Varazvahan became the new nakharar in 477. Hadz the brother of Gelehon died on 25 September 482. The Syunik Province was later governed by Vahan (c. 570), Philip (Philipo, c. 580), Stephen (Stephanos, c. 590–597), Sahak (Isaac, c. 597) and Grigor (Gregory, until 640).

=== Medieval Syunik ===
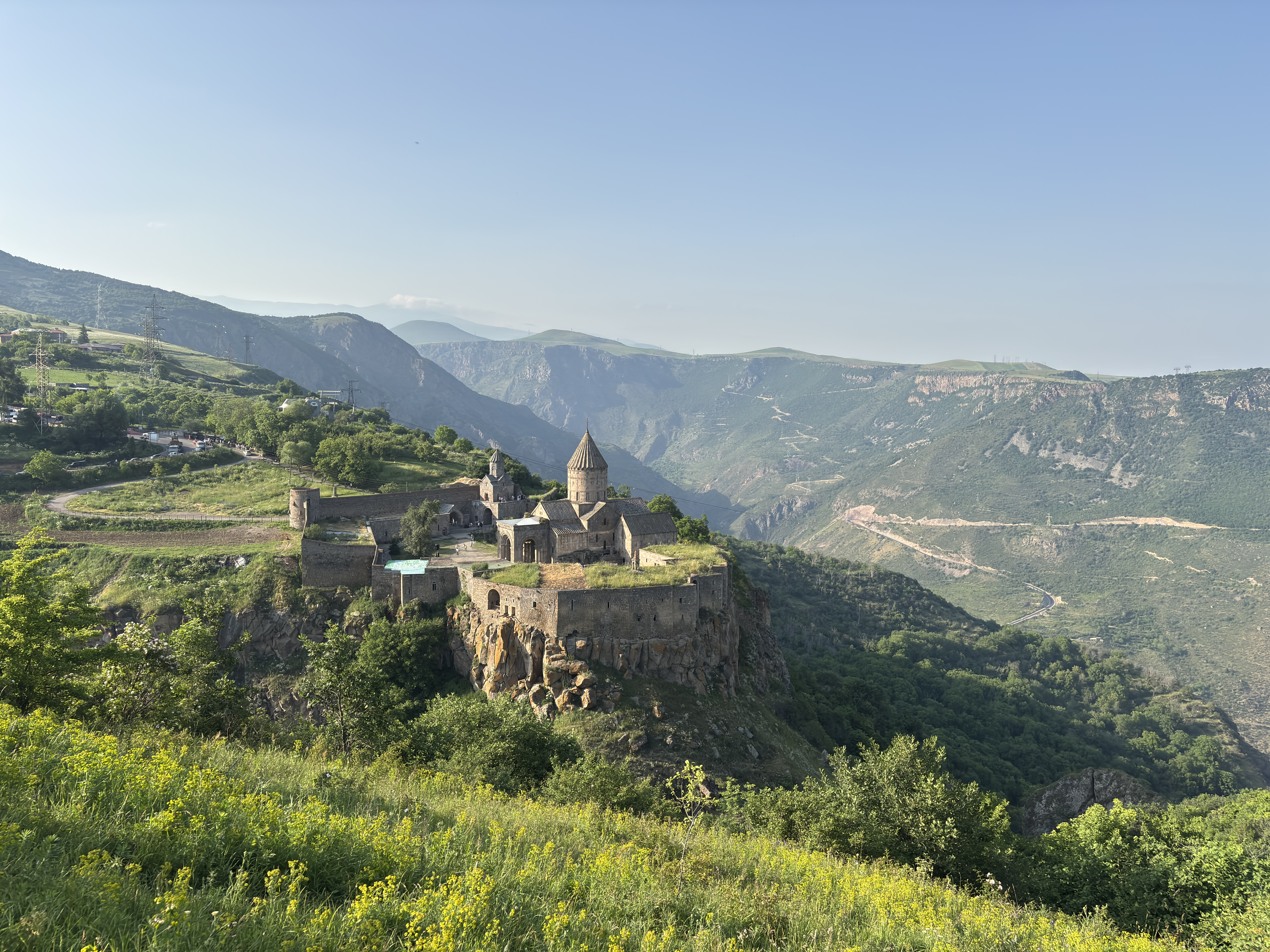
Tatev Monastery, 8th century

A dynasty was formed, governed by a branch of the Bagratuni, with minor vassal princes from one or more previous dynasties. Vasak III (c. 800) suffered an assault from the emir of Manazkert, Sevada. He established a garrison in Chalat, in the district of Dzoluk. He then called for help from the Persian revolutionary chief Babak Khorramdin, who married a daughter of the king.

After the death of Vasak III in 821, Babak inherited the country that revolted against him. Babak suppressed the revolt but was harassed by both Muslims and Armenians. Finally, he abdicated and the children of Vasak, Philip and Sahak, regained power. Philip controlled over eastern Syunik, including the cantons of the Vayots Dzor and Baghk. Sahak governed the western canton of Syunik, known as Gegharkunik.

In 826, Sahak allied with his ancient enemy – Sevada, the Qaisite emir of Manazkert – against the governor of Caliph, but he was defeated and died in Kavakert. His son Grigor-Sufan succeeded him as prince of Western Syunik. In the Eastern region, Philipo died on 10 August 848. He was succeeded by three children (Babgen, Vasak-Ichkhanik and Achot) that ruled jointly. Babgen fought with Grigor-Sufan and killed him (sometime in 849–851) but Babgen died shortly after (851) and Vasak-Ichkhanik (Vasak IV) followed him. Vasak-Ichkhanik had peaceful relations with Vasak-Gabor, who had ascended to the throne of Western Syunik, replacing his father Grigor-Sufan. Nerseh Pilippean, brother of Babgen, directed (822–23) an expedition to Aghuania defeating and killing the prince Varaz-Terdat II (of the Persian dynasty Mihrakane of Aghuania) in Morgog. A general sent by the Caliph, Bugha al-Kabir, destroyed Armenia and Aghuania in these years and sent a detachment to Eastern Syunik where was governing Vasak IV with his brother Achot. The people of Syunik were sheltered in the fortress of Balq, but Vasak fled to Kotaiq, and was pursued to the region of Gardman on the eastern border of Lake Sevan. Gardman's prince (ichkhan) Ketridj or Ketritchn betrayed him and delivered him to Bogha (859). Achot was also seized (859). But Bogha invaded Gardman and imprisoned Kertridj. He then went to Outi where he captured the prince of Sevordiq, Stephannos Kun.

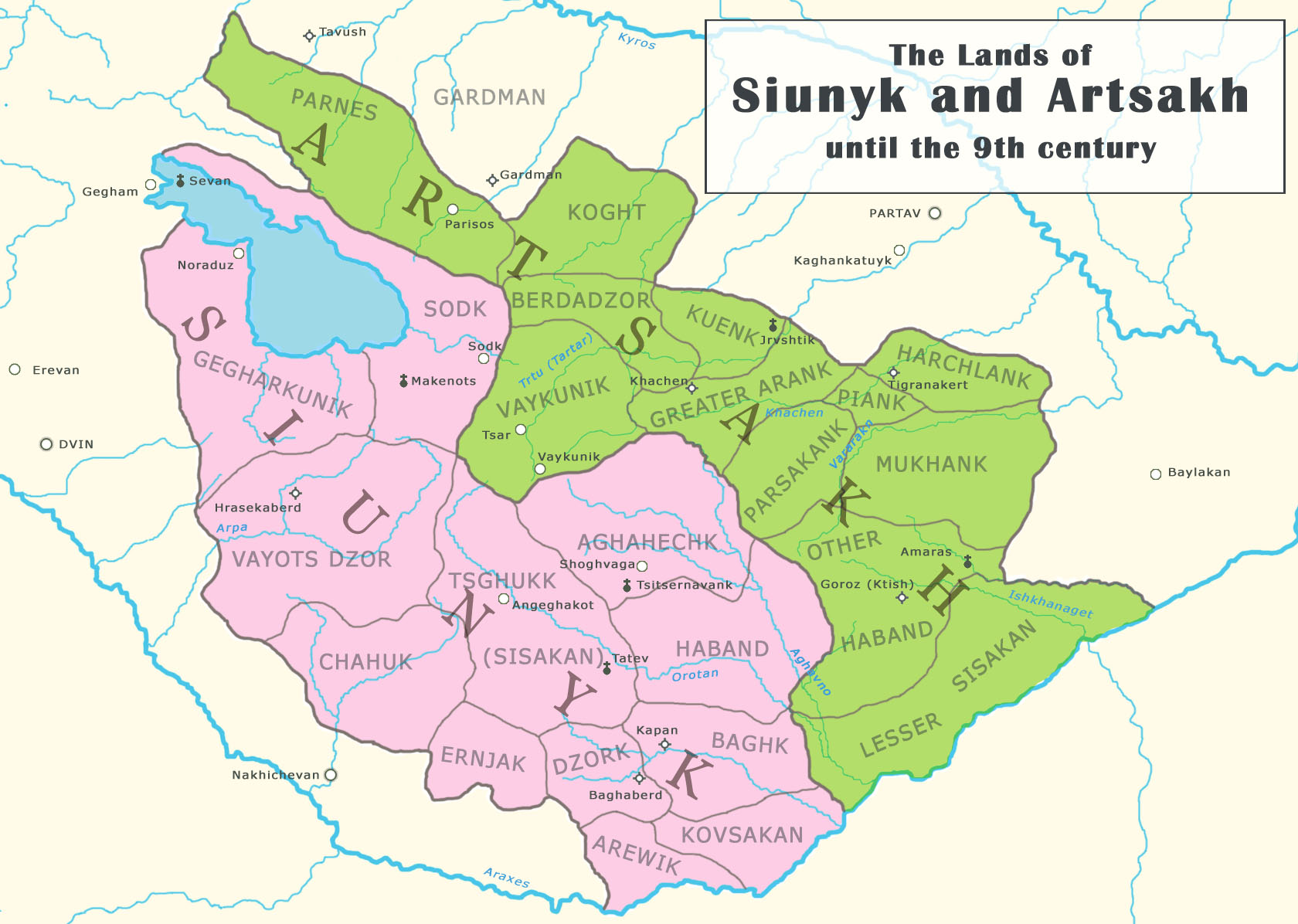
Syunik and Artsakh until the 9th century

The Caliphate tried to control all these regions, and for this reason, Bogha decided to repopulate the city of Chamkor in the Kura River with Muslims. Chamkor, being near Barda and Ganja, was intended to act as a regional monitoring post. By order of the new Caliph in 862, the imprisoned princes were to be released and allowed to return to their former domains on the condition of becoming Muslim. (However, they all abandoned Islam after their return.)

The prince of Western Syunik, Vasak-Gabor, was married to a daughter of the Bagratid prince Ashot the Great named Miriam and received the title of Ichkhan from the Syunik people – delivered to him by Ashot in name of the Caliph. His successor was his son, Grigor-Sufan II (887–909). The prince of Eastern Syunik, Vasak IV, died around 887 and was followed by his brother Achot who died c. 906.

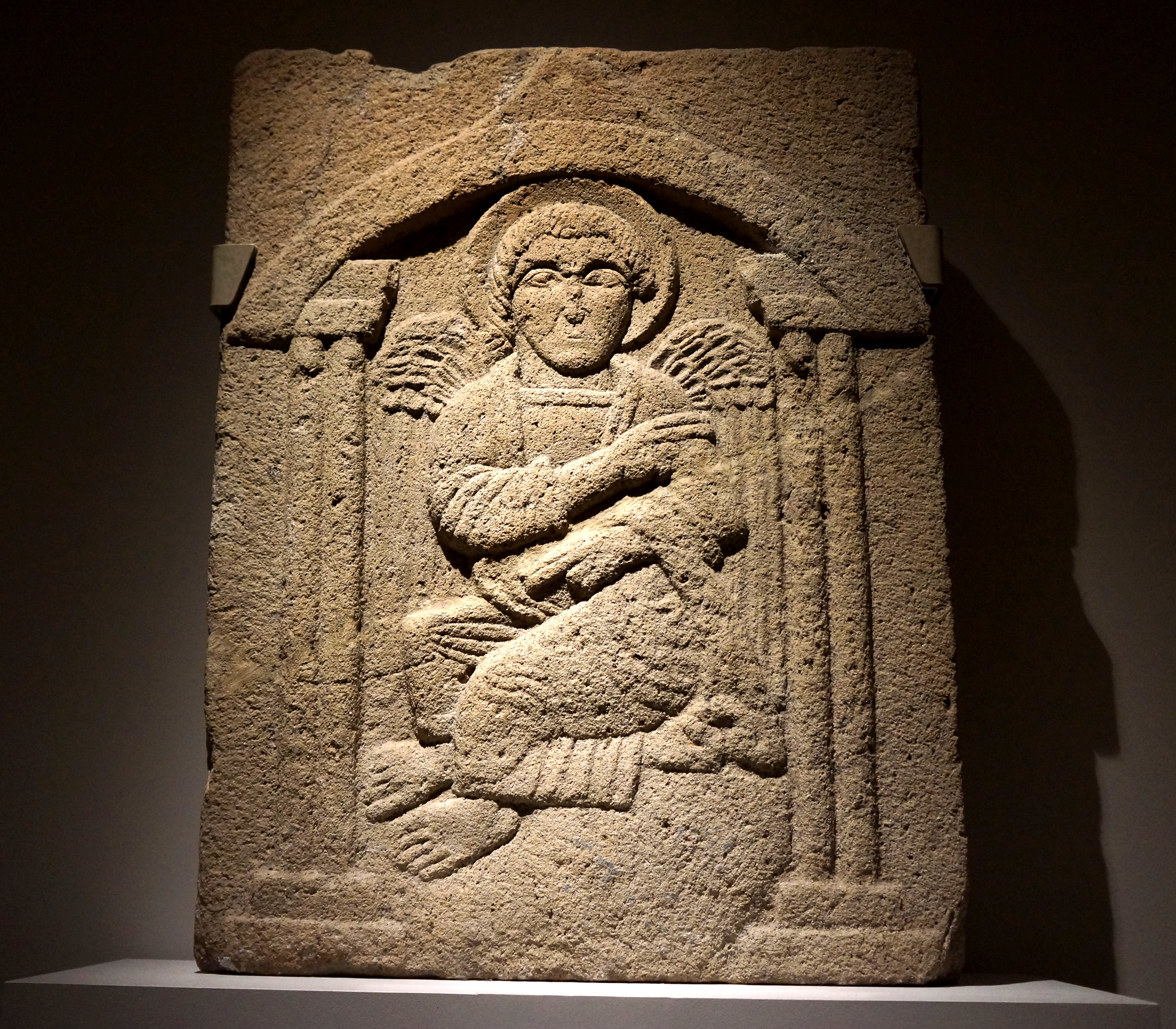
Bas-relief of an angel (Siwnik, 10th century AD sandstone).

The son of Vasak IV, Sembat, that received the fiefdom from Vayots Dzor. Chahaponk (Jahuk) governed from 887 until sometime after 920. He revolted in 903 against the Bagratid Sembat I, refusing to pay him taxes. Because of this, he was assaulted by the prince of Vaspurakan, Sargis-Ashot. Sembat submitted, was forgiven and married to the sister of the prince of Vaspurakan, receiving the city and district of Nakhchivan, which in 902 was upset with the Kaysites or Qaisids.

A few years later, the prince allied with the emir of Sadjid, Yusuf, against Eastern Syunik, which they invaded together. Sembat was sheltered in the fortress of Erendchak (today Alinja, northeast of Nakhchivan) and Yusuf remained owner of Eastern Syunik. Sembat requested refuge from his brother-in-law Khatchik-Gagik, which was granted. In the same year (909), the prince of Western Syunik, Grigor Sufan II, submitted to the emir Yusuf in Dwin. Only Byzantine movements and the withdrawal of the Sadjids permitted him to recover the throne sometime later. Sembat, with his three brothers Sahak, Babgen, and Vasak, governed again. Also in Western Syunik, Sahak, Ashot and Vasak, brothers of Grigor-Sufan II, were governing the country. After them the dynasty of Western Syunik became extinct and the territory was subsumed by the Muslims.

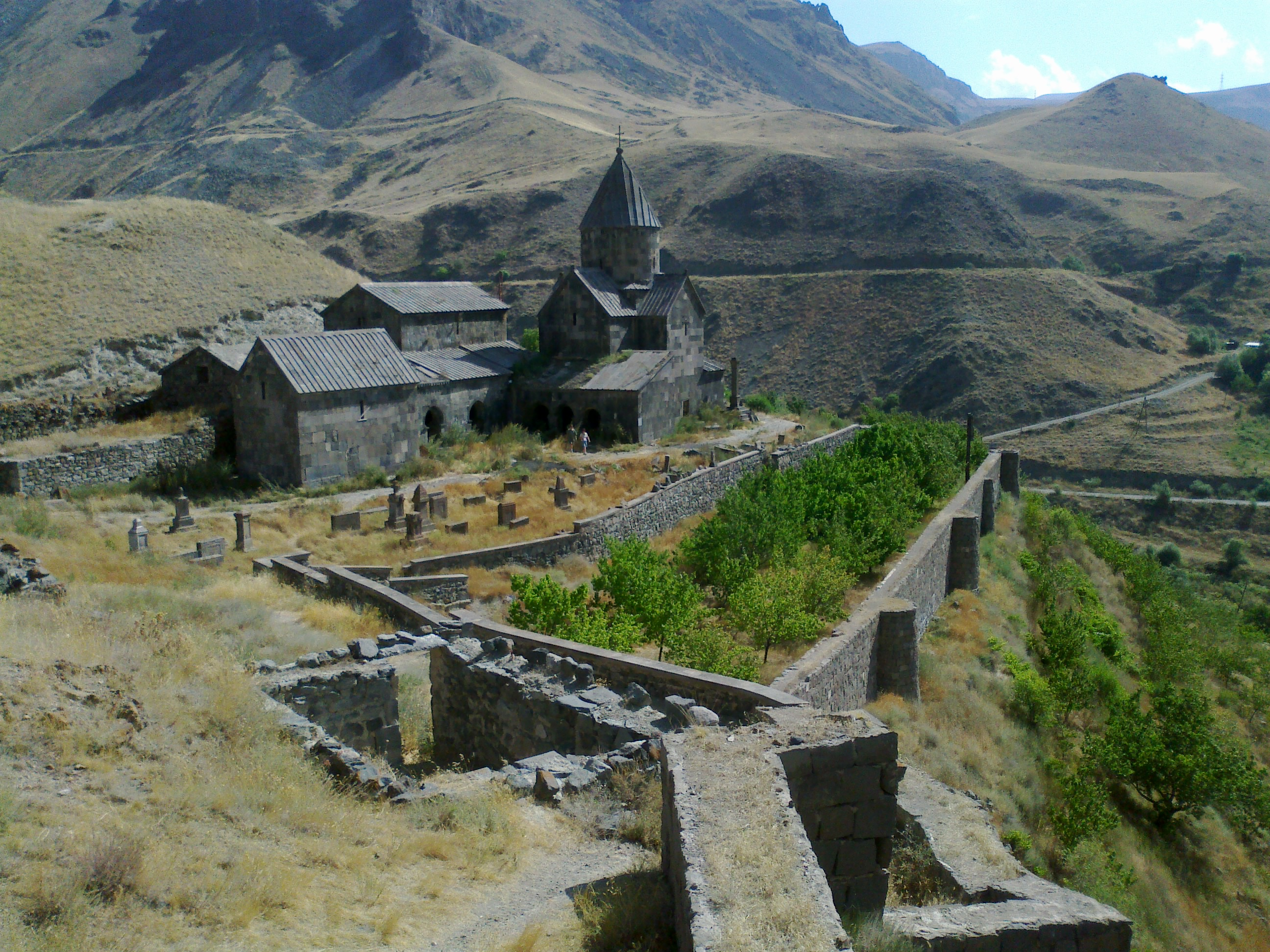
Vorotnavank monastic complex of the 10-11th centuries

The eastern part remained divided: Sembat, which had the main title, governed the western part of the Eastern Syunik with the Vayots Dzor, bordered by Vaspurakan. Sahak governed the eastern part until the river Hakar. Babgen governed the district of the Baghk, and Vasak (who died in 922) an indeterminate territory. Nasr, the emir of Azerbaijan, captured territory through perfidy against Babgen and Sahak in Dwin. After the invasion, Sembat unseated Nasr and obtained the freedom of his brothers. Sembat was followed by his son Vasak, and Sahak in turn by his son Sembat. Vasak received the royal title from the Muslims at the end of his reign, which lasted until 963.

The throne was inherited by his nephew Sembat (963–998) who was recognized as king by the emirs of Tauris and of Arran. He was married to the princess of Aghuania, Chahandoukht. At his death, he was followed by Vasak (c. 998–1019). Vasak was succeeded by two nephews (the children of his sister and a Prince Achot) called Sembat and Grigor (1019–1084). During his periods Syunik was vassal of Great Seljuk Empire. Grigor was married with the princess Chahandoukht, daughter of Sevada of Aghuania. The only successor to the two princes, was a daughter of Grigor's called Chahandoukht. Rule passed to the prince of Aghuania, Seneqerim Ioan who governed both territories from 1084 until his death in 1105. Seneqerim Ioan was followed by his son Grigor of Syunik and Aghuania, who governed until 1166 when the country was conquered by the Seljuq Turks. It was ruled by Seljuks of Hamadan, Atabegs of Azerbaijan, Kingdom of Georgia, Khwarezmshahs, Ilkhanate, Chupanids, Jalayirids, Kara Koyunlu, Timurid Empire and Aq Qoyunlu successively before Safavid rule. It mostly had autonomous rule and was for some periods fully independent under the Armenian meliks

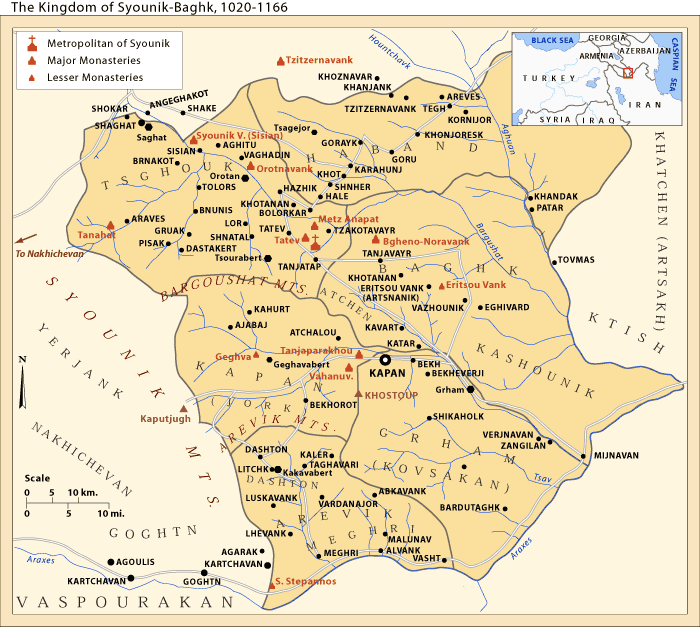
Kingdom of Syunik, 1020-1166

Later, the Orbelian dynasty, one of whose members wrote an important history of the country, governed Syunik in times of Timur (Tamerlan) as vassals.

=== Iranian rule ===
Between the middle of the 18th century and early in the 19th century, the Syunik was part of the Karabakh khanate of the Safavid Empire. It was also ruled by the Ottomans between 1578 and 1606 and again between 1722 and 1736.

By the beginning of the 18th century, Syunik was associated with the Armenian military leader David Bek, who led the liberation campaign of the Armenians of Syunik against Safavid Persia and the invading Ottoman Turks. David Bek started his battles in 1722 with the help of thousands of local Armenian patriots who liberated Syunik. The centre of David Bek's struggle was the Baghaberd Fortress northwest of Kapan and Halidzor Fortress southwest of Kapan where he died in 1728.

=== Imperial Russian rule ===
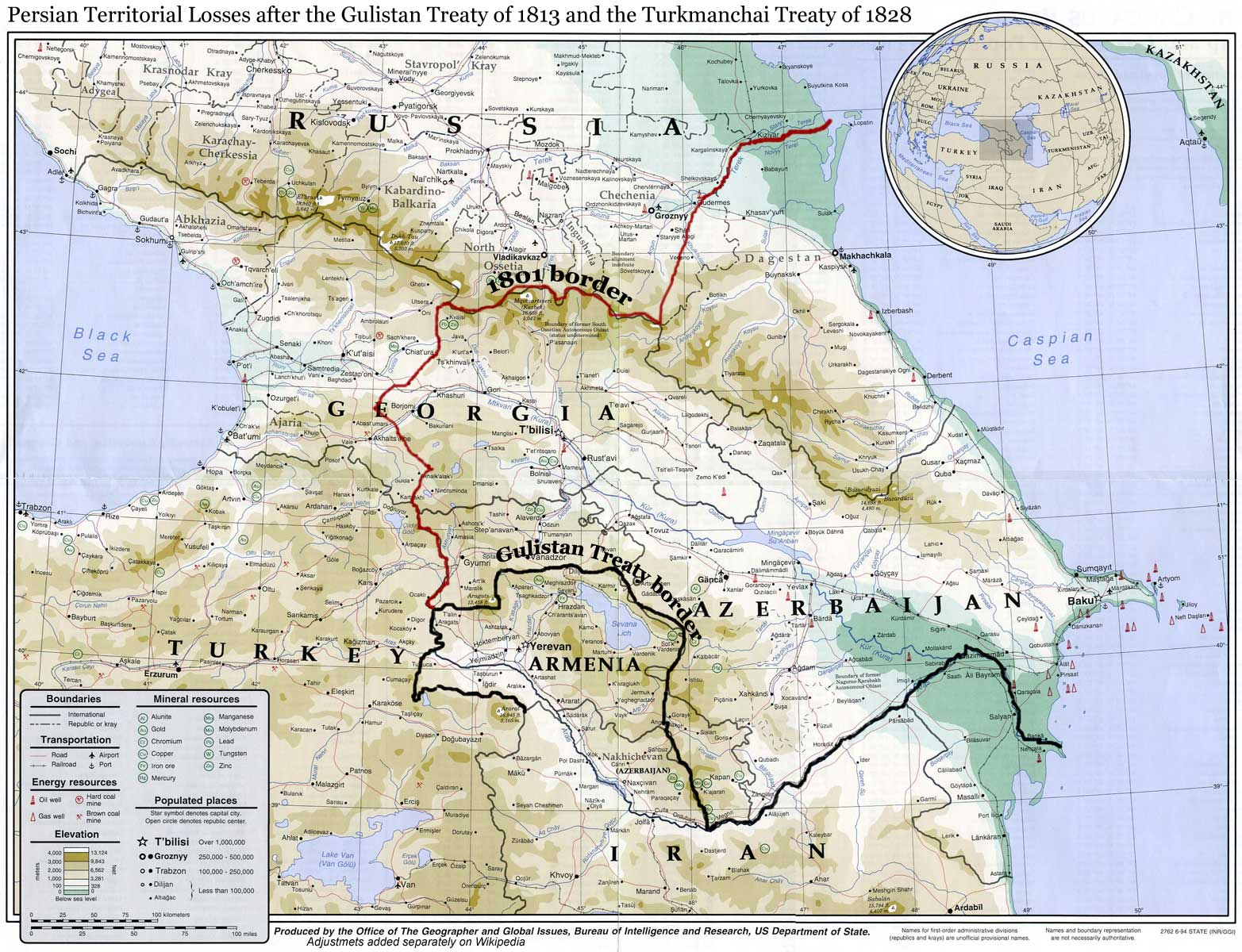
Syunik becomes part of the Russian Empire as per the Treaty of Gulistan signed in 1813

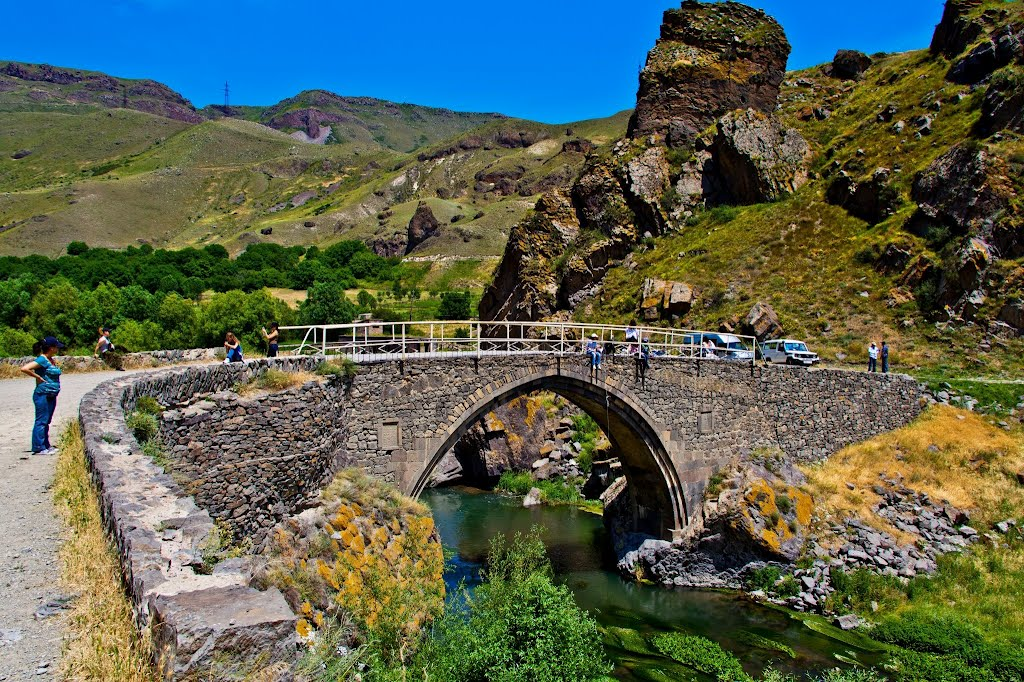
Melik Tangi Bridge of 1855 near Sisian

Following the Russo-Persian War of 1804–13, Syunik -along with the rest of Karabakh Khanate- passed into Imperial Russian possession, officially signed in the Treaty of Gulistan in 1813. The khanate was abolished by the Russian government in 1822. The region was divided between the Erivan Governorate, and Baku Governorate (known as Shemakha Governorate until 1859). When the Elisabethpol Governorate was established in 1868, the region became part of the Zangezursky Uyezd, with its administration based in the town of Geryusy starting from 1870.

According to the official census of the Russian Empire in 1897, the total population of Zangezursky Uyezd was 137,971, with 51.6% of them were Caucasian Tatars and 46,1% were Armenians.

The beginning of 20th century saw an outbreak in ethnic tensions between the Armenian and Tatar populations in the Caucasus, culminating in the Armenian-Tatar massacres. Clashes occurred in Nakhchivan and Sharur-Daralgez uyezdy of the Erevan gubernia and in Zangezur, Shusha and Javanshir uezdy of Elizavetpol gubernia in 1905. According to Armenian sources 128 Armenian and 158 Azerbaijanian villages were "pillaged or destroyed" while the overall estimates of lives lost vary widely, ranging from 3,000 to 10,000, with Muslims suffering higher losses. During these events, the Armenians of Syunik were massacred "without distinction of sex or age" by Azeri forces, and children were mutilated.

Tensions were accelerated with the collapse of the Russian Empire. The region fell under the authority of the Special Transcaucasian Committee of the Russian Provisional Government and subsequently the short-lived Transcaucasian Democratic Federative Republic. When the TDFR was dissolved in May 1918, Zangezur, Nakhchivan, and Nagorno-Karabakh became heavily contested between the newly formed and short-lived states of the Republic of Armenia and the Azerbaijan Democratic Republic. At the time, Syunik had an Armenian majority of 350,000 and a Muslim population of 180,000. According to Thomas de Waal, the dispute over Syunik resulted in the displacement of region's Caucasian Tatar minority through direct military action by Armenian guerrilla commanders Andranik, Rouben Ter Minassian and later Garegin Nzhdeh.

=== Republic of Armenia ===
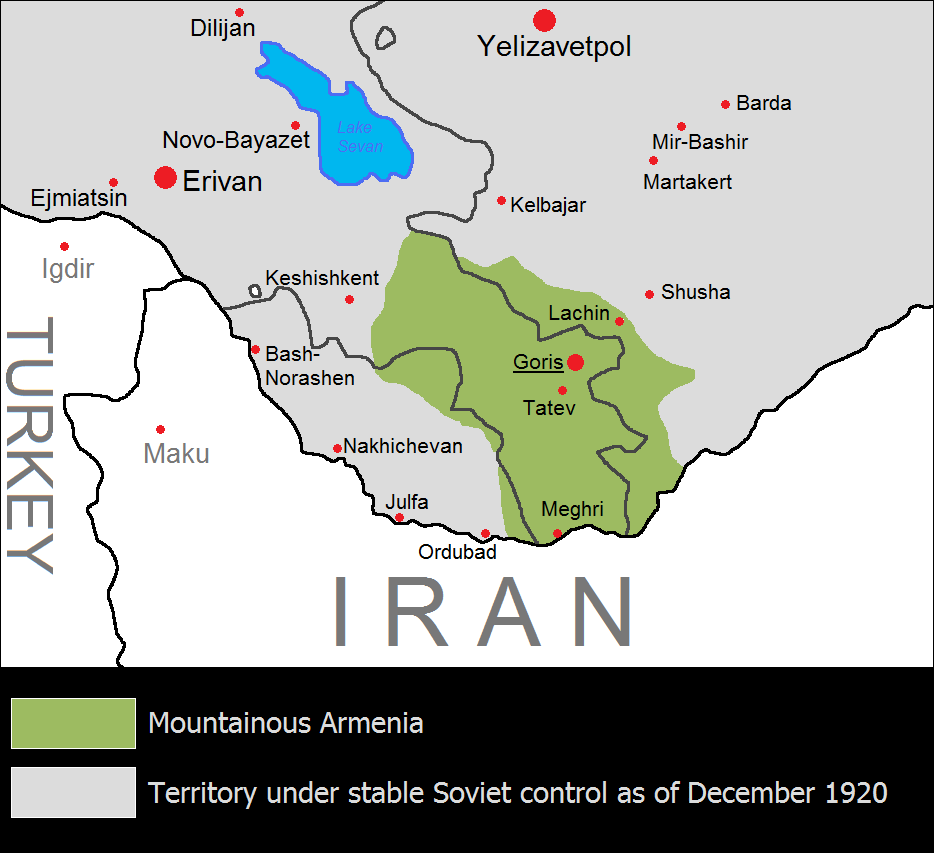
The Republic of Mountainous Armenia in 1921, mainly occupying present-day Syunik

Between 1918 and 1920 Syunik was included in the short-lived Republic of Armenia. After the Sovietization of Armenia, Syunik became the main centre of the resistance against the Bolsheviks, thus becoming part of the unrecognized Republic of Mountainous Armenia. The city of Goris became the capital of the unrecognized state, and Garegin Nzhdeh was chosen as prime minister and minister of defence. Later, in July, Simon Vratsian took the office as prime minister while Nzhdeh became the governor and the general commander. Nzhdeh actively engaged in expelling the 3/5th Azerbaijani population of Zangezur.

Between April and July 1921, the Red Army conducted massive military operations in the region, attacking Syunik from the north and east. After months of fierce battles with the Red Army, the Republic of Mountainous Armenia capitulated in July 1921 following Soviet Russia's promises to keep the mountainous region as a part of Soviet Armenia. After the conflict, Garegin Nzhdeh, his soldiers, and many prominent Armenian intellectuals, including leaders of the Republic of Armenia, crossed the border into the neighbouring city of Tabriz in Persia. Thus, Syunik became part of the Armenian Soviet Socialist Republic in July 1921.

=== Soviet Syunik ===
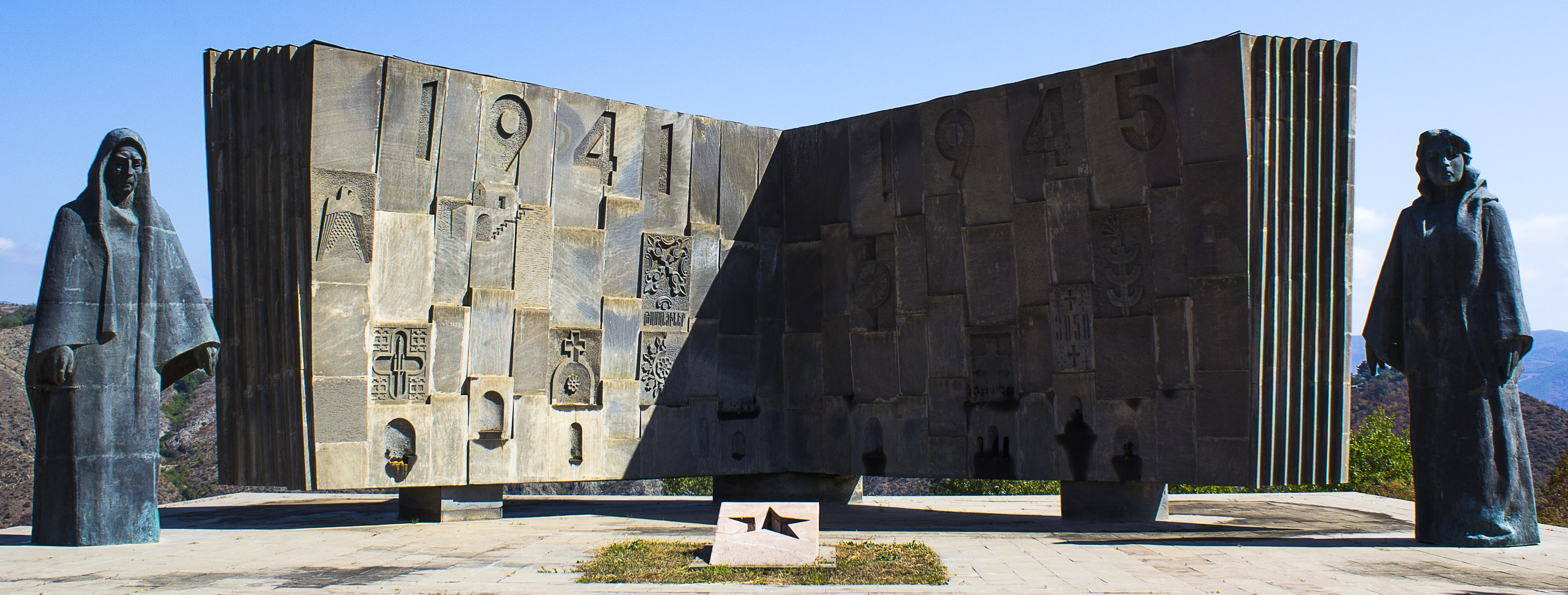
Great Patriotic War memorial near Kapan built during the 1970s

Armenian forces eventually secured the region but their efforts were in vain when the Bolsheviks, successful in the Russian Civil War, pushed deep into the Caucasus. Syunik was one of the last major holdouts of the independent Armenian state whose leaders were eventually expelled by incoming Soviet authorities to Iran. During Sovietization, Syunik became part of Soviet Armenia, while the two other disputed territories, Nakhchivan and Nagorno-Karabakh became part of Soviet Azerbaijan. It then became part of Armenia under the Transcaucasian SFSR and part of the Armenian SSR in 1936. Under Soviet rule, Syunik suffered a devastating earthquake in April 1931, leaving 80% of its villages destroyed. A subsequent earthquake hit the region in May during the same year, destroying 27 of 38 villages in the Sisian district.

As an administrative unit, modern-day Syunik was divided into the four raions of Meghri, Kapan, Goris and Sisian (four the current eight "communities" share names and main towns with the Soviet era raions).

Despite the region's troubled early years in the Soviet Union, it gradually began to recover with much of the area's infrastructure rebuilt and improved. During the Soviet era, Syunik was noted as a source of metal and ore production. However, the region was shaken by the renewal of the conflict over Nagorno-Karabakh with neighbouring Azerbaijan. In 1987–1989, the remaining Azeri inhabitants fled the region as a result of interethnic violence. This exodus of Azeri population made Syunik and Armenia, in general, more homogeneous.

=== Independent Armenia ===
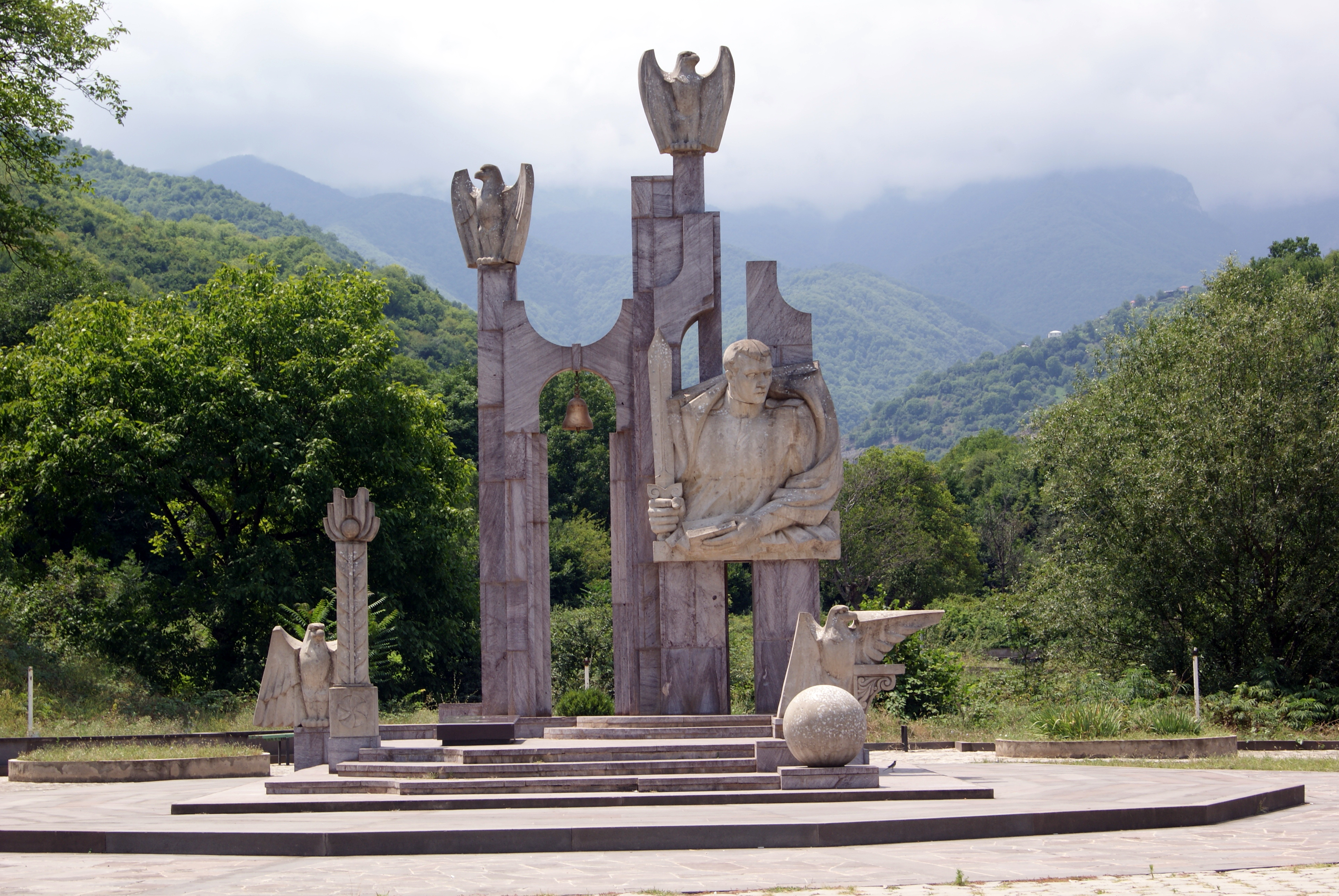
Garegin Nzhdeh's memorial near Kapan, opened in 2001

Since the dissolution of the Soviet Union in 1991, Syunik has been a constituent part of the Republic of Armenia. After the independence of Armenia, the four raions of Soviet Syunik were merged during the 1995 administrative reform to form the Syunik Province with the town of Kapan as the provincial capital.

Being the republic's southernmost province, it has gained a strategic and economic importance for Armenia. The border with Iran enhanced the export of vital energy resources from Armenia to Iran and other regions. Recently, a new 140-kilometer-long Armenia-Iran pipeline has been opened, projected to supply Armenia with up to 1.1 billion m^{3} of gas per year until 2019, when the target of the supply is expected to rise to 2.3 billion m^{3} annually." The new pipeline attracted Armenia's northern neighbor Georgia, seeking to lessen its dependence on energy from Russia.

In 2000, an old cemetery was found between the villages of Kornidzor and Khndzoresk near Goris. It was built during the Kara Koyunlu rule.

As a result of the 2020 Nagorno-Karabakh War, the territories to the east of Syunik, which had been under Armenian control since the First Nagorno-Karabakh War, came under Azerbaijani control, lengthening the province's border with Azerbaijan and creating fears about the province's security. In one border settlement in Syunik, Shurnukh, 12 houses came under the control of Azerbaijan after being found to be located on the Azerbaijani side of the border. Additionally, several parts of the important highway between Goris and Kapan came under Azerbaijani control.

The ninth point of the 2020 Nagorno-Karabakh ceasefire agreement that ended the 2020 war stated that "All economic and transport connections in the region shall be unblocked. The Republic of Armenia shall guarantee the security of transport connections between the western regions of the Republic of Azerbaijan and the Nakhchivan Autonomous Republic in order to arrange unobstructed movement of persons, vehicles and cargo in both directions." The president of Azerbaijan Ilham Aliyev insisted that this meant that Armenia is obligated to provide a "corridor" to Azerbaijan through Syunik and threatened to establish the "corridor" by force if Armenia did not oblige. Prime Minister Nikol Pashinyan rejected this, arguing that the ceasefire agreement does not call for a corridor through Syunik but for the general opening of transportation routes between the two countries. Starting on 12 May 2021, Azerbaijani forces crossed several kilometers into Armenian territory in Syunik and occupied the area around Lake Sev in Syunik, precipitating a border crisis between Armenia and Azerbaijan. On 10 November 2021 it was announced the alternate Goris-Kapan highway completely within Armenia's borders was completed.

== Demographics ==
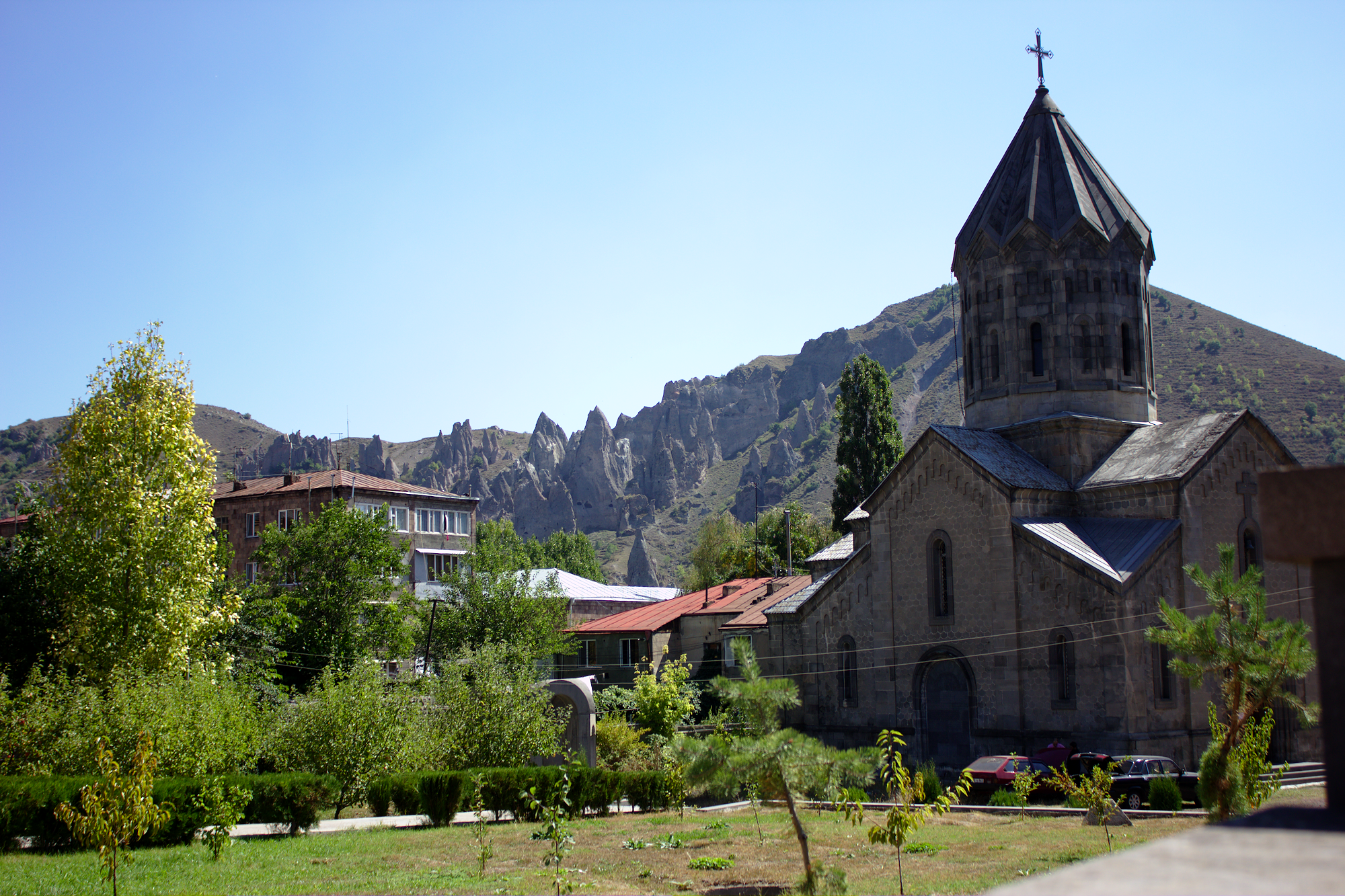
Cathedral of Saint Gregory in Goris, the seat of the Diocese of Syunik of the Armenian Apostolic Church

=== Population ===
In 1989, the Syunik Province (made up of the Sisian, Goris, Meghri, and Kapan raions from 1930 to 1995) had a population of 141,501. 66,170 or 46.76% of which was urban, divided into Goris (23,795) and Kapan (42,375), and 75,331 or 53.24% were rural, distributed into the districts of Sisian (29,768), Goris (17,979), Meghri (14,341), and Kapan (13,243).

According to the 2011 official census, Syunik has a population of 141,771 (69,836 men and 71,935 women), forming around 4.7% of the entire population of Armenia. The urban population is 95,170 (67.13%) and the rural is 46,601 (32.87%). The province has 7 urban and 102 rural communities. The largest urban community is the provincial center of Kapan, with a population of 43,190. The other urban centres are Goris, Sisian, Kajaran, Meghri, Agarak and Dastakert.

With a population of 2,661, the village of Shinuhayr is the largest rural municipality of Syunik.

=== Ethnic groups and religion ===
Syunik is almost entirely populated by ethnic Armenians who belong to the Armenian Apostolic Church. The regulating body of the church is the Diocese of Syunik, currently headed by Rev. Fr. Zaven Yazichyan. The Saint Gregory Cathedral of Goris is the seat of the diocese.

== Administrative divisions ==
As a result of the administrative reforms took place on 24 November 2015, 17 June 2016 and 9 June 2017, Syunik is currently divided into 8 municipal communities (hamaynkner), of which 5 are urban, and 3 are rural:

Municipality	Type	Area (km^{2})	Population (2022 census)	Centre	Included villages
Goris Municipality	Urban		24,249	Goris	Akner, Bardzravan, Hartashen, Karahunj, Khndzoresk, Nerkin Khndzoresk, Shurnukh, Verishen, Vorotan. (Abandoned: Aghbulagh, Dzorak, Vanand).
Kajaran Municipality	Urban		7,416	Kajaran	Ajabaj, Andokavan, Babikavan, Dzagikavan, Geghi, Getishen, Kajarants, Katnarat, Kavchut, Lernadzor, Nor Astghaberd, Pkhrut. (Abandoned: Geghavank, Kard, Karut, Kitsk, Nerkin Giratagh, Verin Giratagh, Verin Geghavank, Vocheti).
Kapan Municipality	Urban		37,868	Kapan	Agarak, Atchanan, Aghvani, Antarashat, Arajadzor, Artsvanik, Bargushat, Chakaten, Chapni, Davit Bek, Ditsmayri, Dzorastan, Geghanush, Gomaran, Kaghnut, Khdrants, Khordzor, Nerkin Hand, Nerkin Khotanan, Norashenik, Okhtar, Sevakar, Shikahogh, Shishkert, Shrvenants, Srashen, Syunik, Sznak, Tandzaver, Tavrus, Tsav, Uzhanis, Vanek, Vardavank, Verin Khotanan, Yegheg, Yeghvard.
Meghri Municipality	Urban		8,977	Meghri	Agarak, Alvank, Aygedzor, Gudemnis, Karchevan, Kuris, Lehvaz, Lichk, Nrnadzor, Shvanidzor, Tashtun, Tkhkut, Vahravar, Vardanidzor.
Sisian Municipality	Urban		25,861	Sisian	Aghitu, Akhlatyan, Angeghakot, Arevis, Ashotavan, Balak, Bnunis, Brnakot, Darbas, Dastakert, Getatagh, Hatsavan, Ishkhanasar, Ltsen, Lor, Mutsk, Noravan, Nzhdeh, Shaki, Salvard, Shaghat, Shamb, Shenatagh, Tanahat, Tasik, Tolors, Torunik, Tsghuni, Uyts, Vaghatin, Vorotnavan.
Gorayk Municipality	Rural			Gorayk	Sarnakunk, Spandaryan, Tsghuk.
Tatev Municipality	Rural		5,239	Shinuhayr	Halidzor, Harzhis, Kashuni, Khot, Svarants, Tandzatap, Tatev.
Tegh Municipality	Rural		4,878	Tegh	Aravus, Karashen, Khnatsakh, Khoznavar, Kornidzor, Vaghatur.

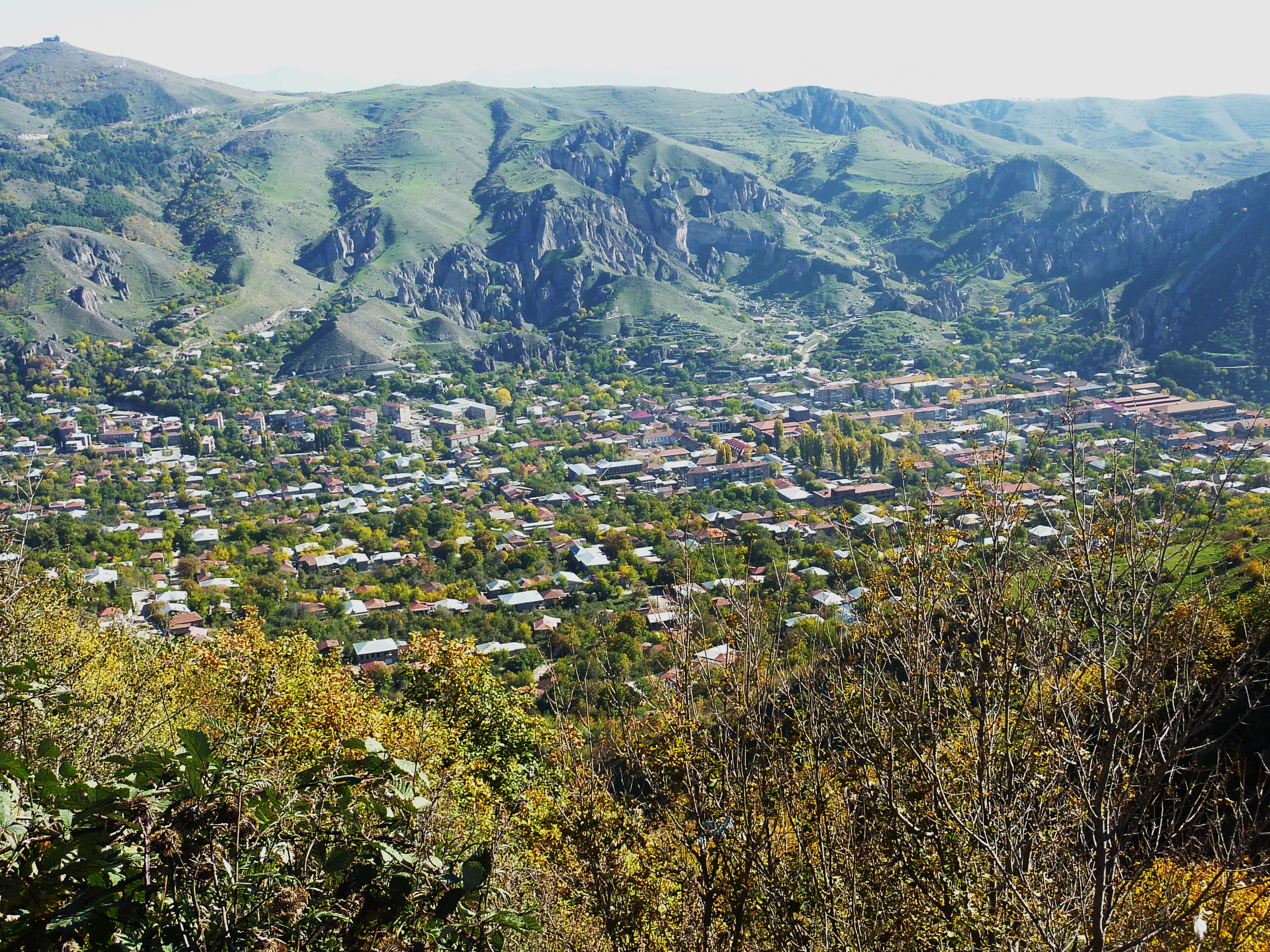
Goris

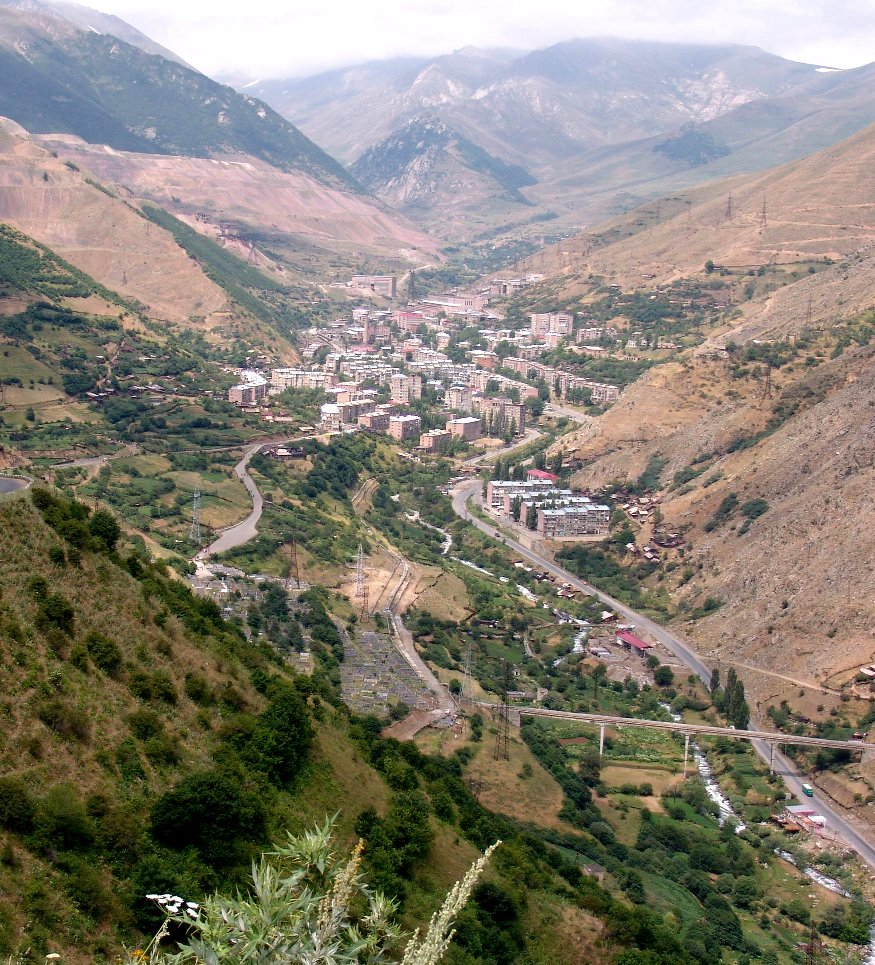
Kajaran

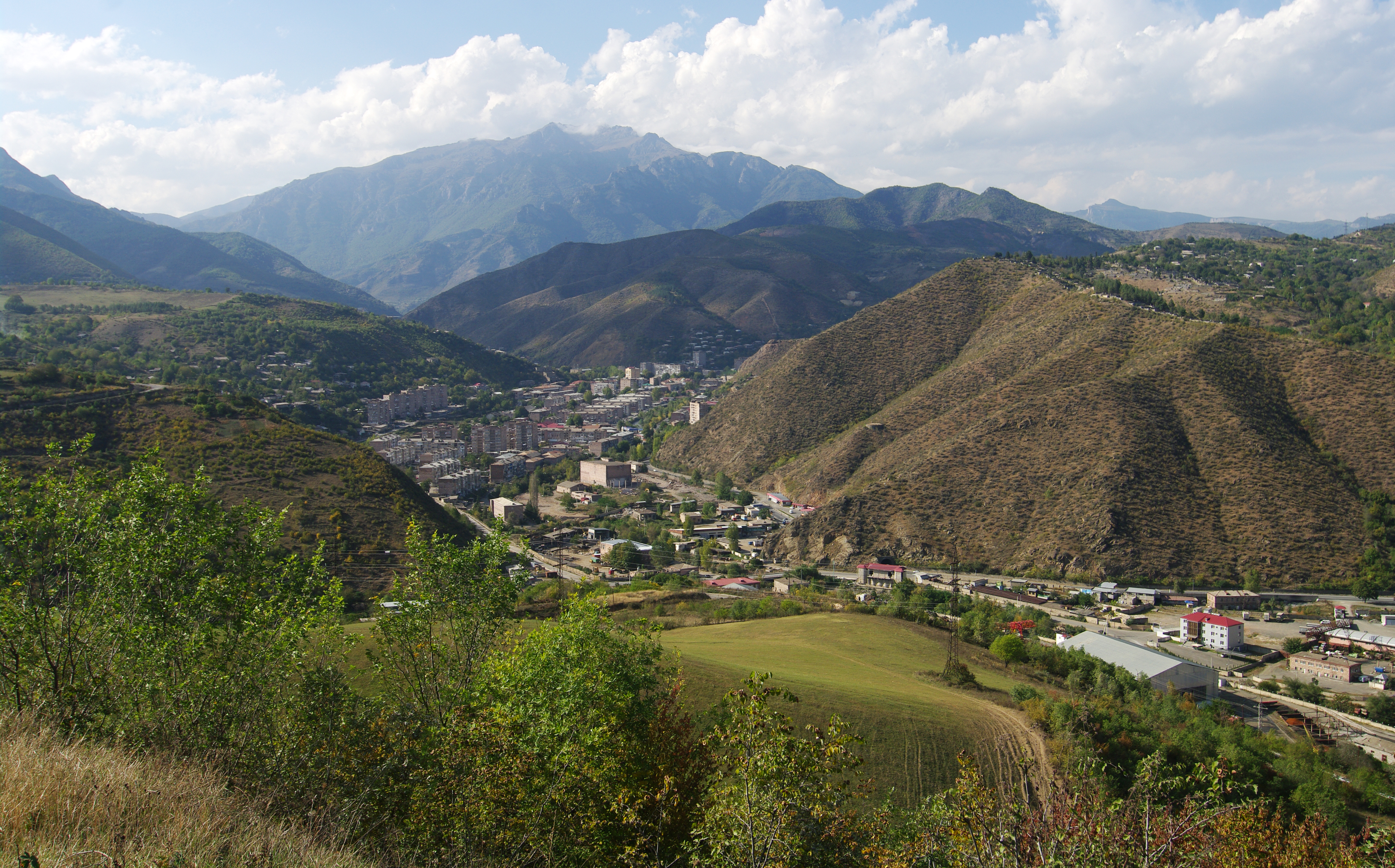
Kapan

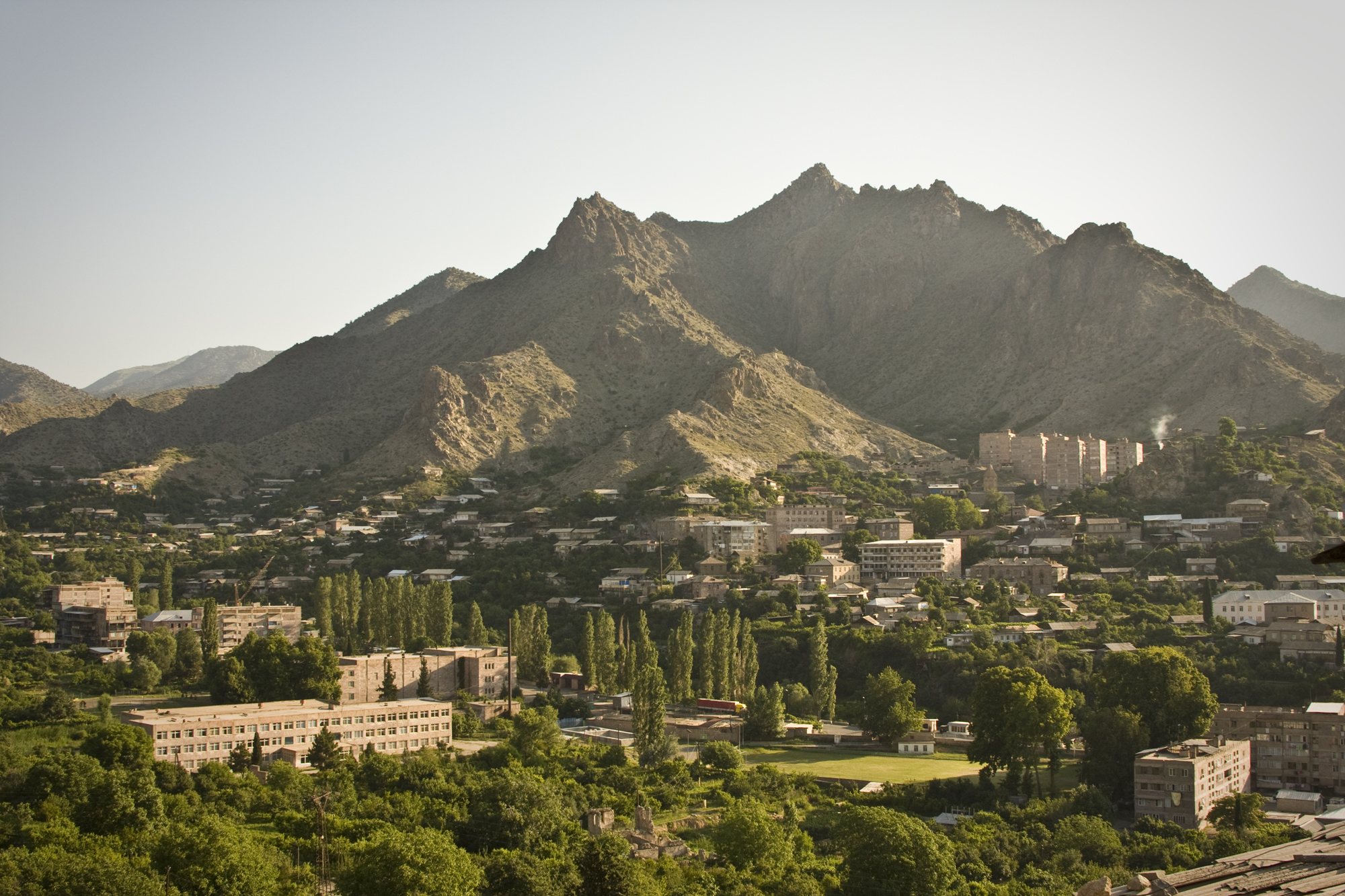
Meghri

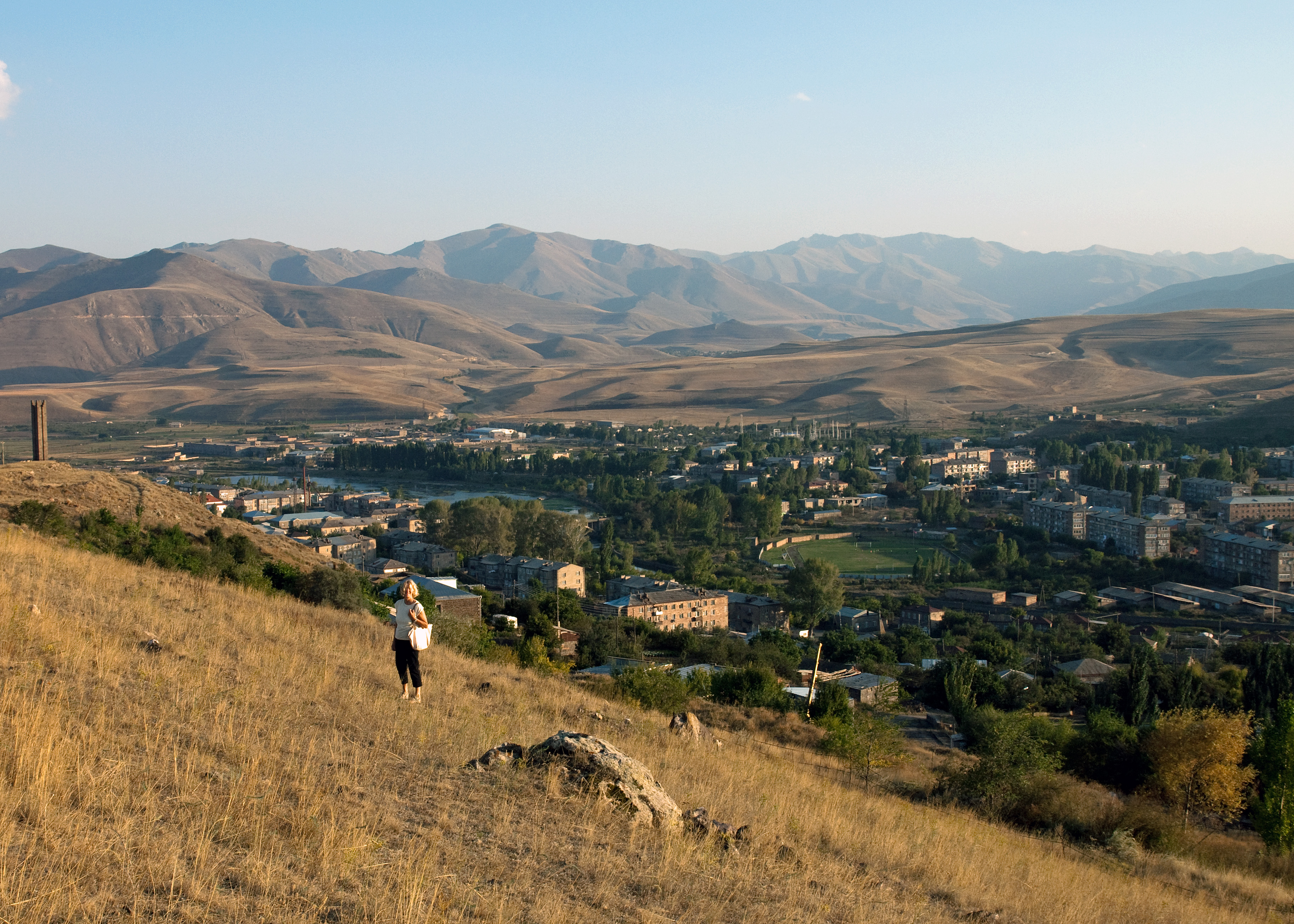
Sisian

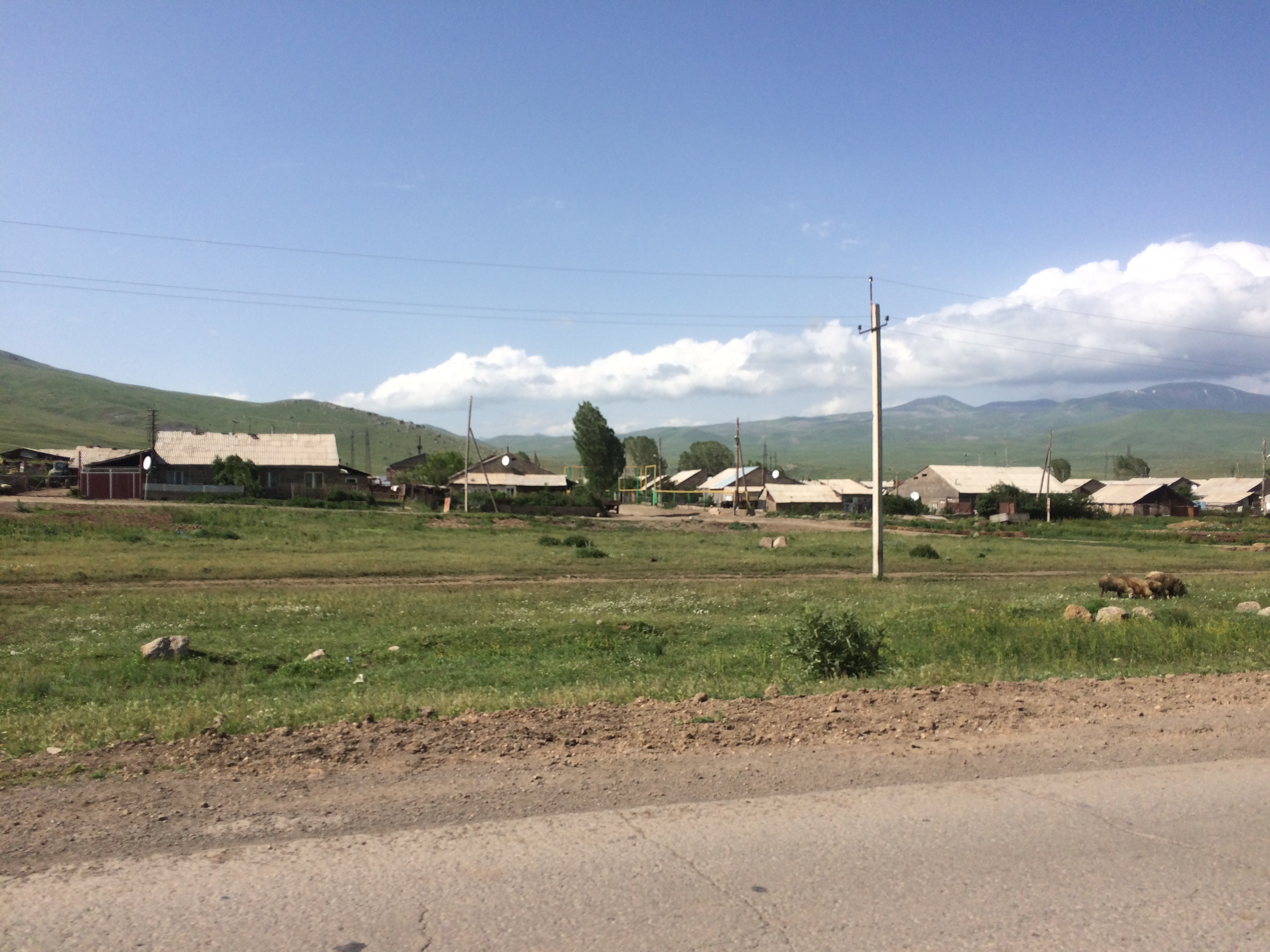
Gorayk

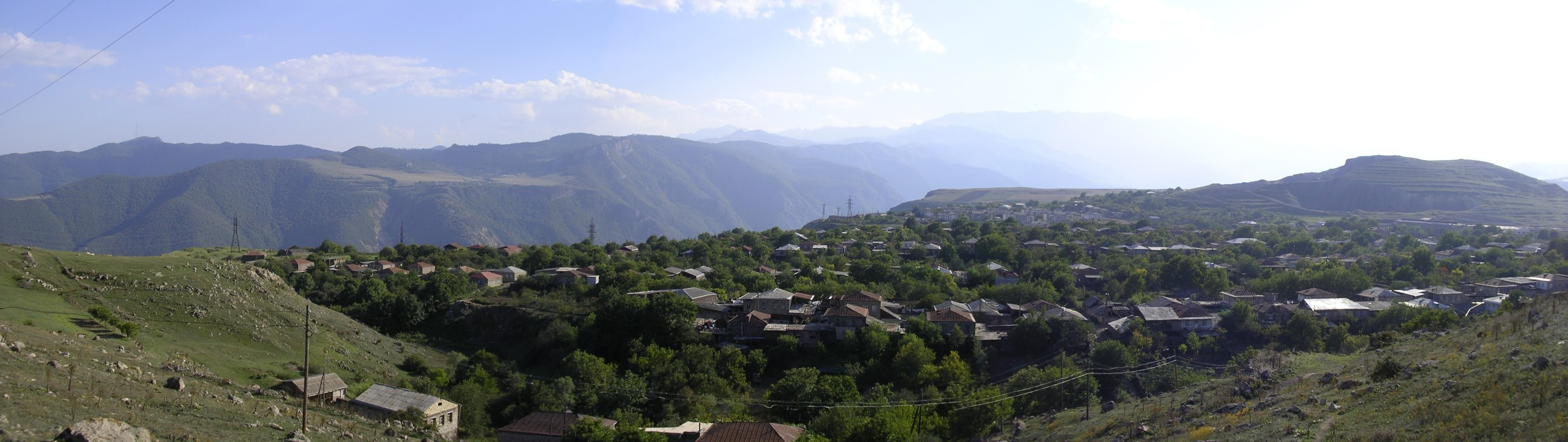
Shinuhayr

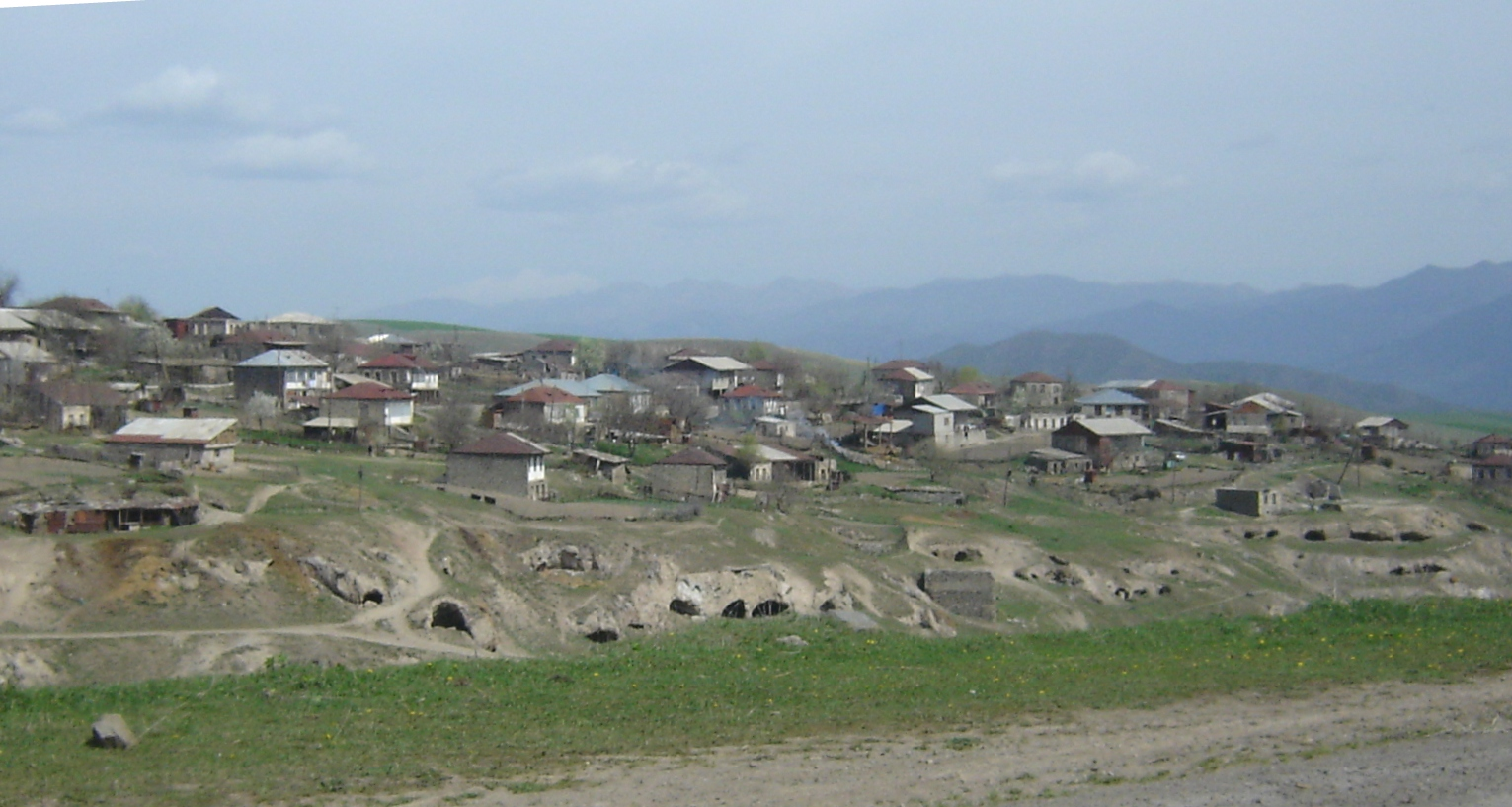
Tegh

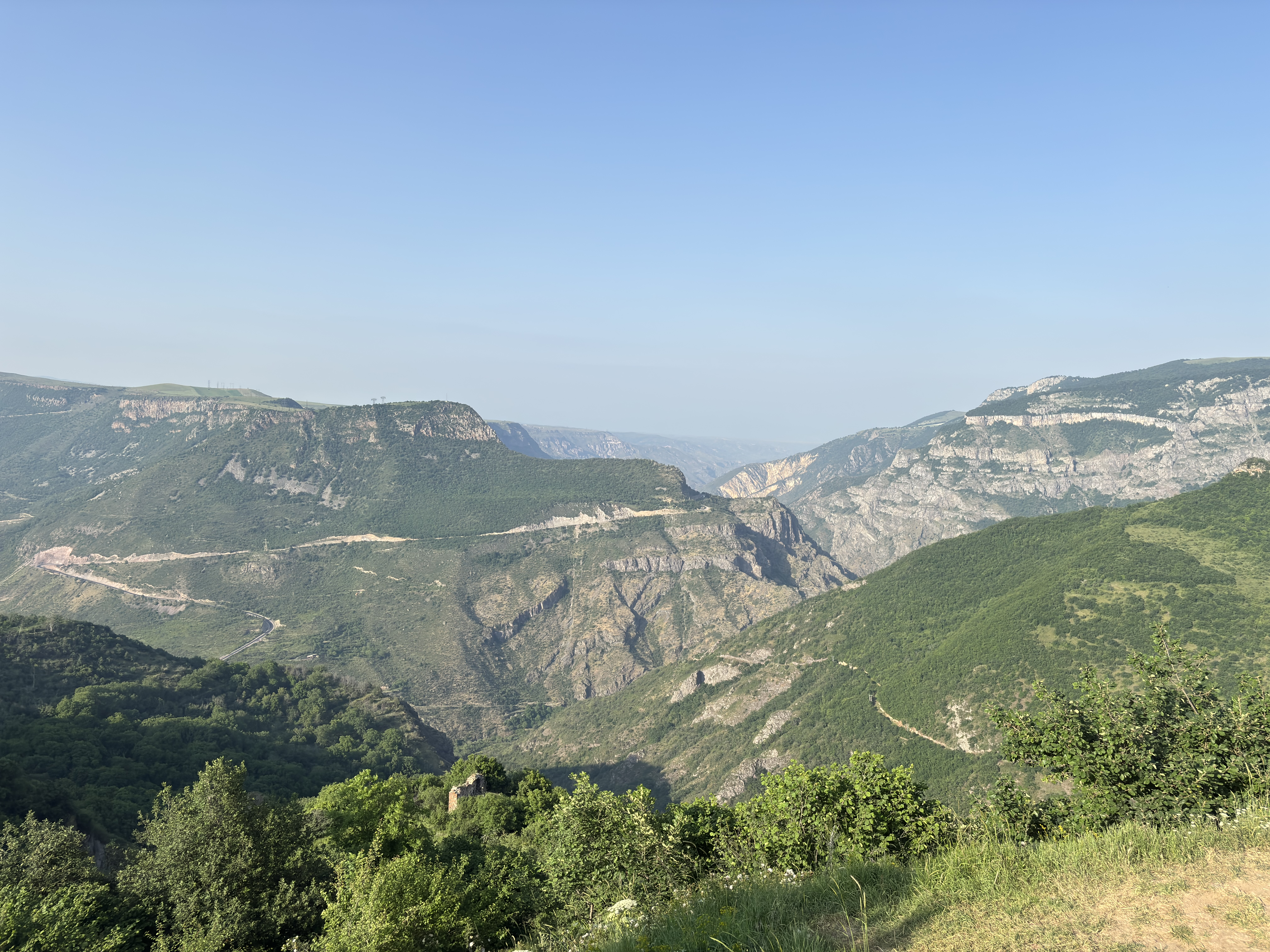
Near Tatev

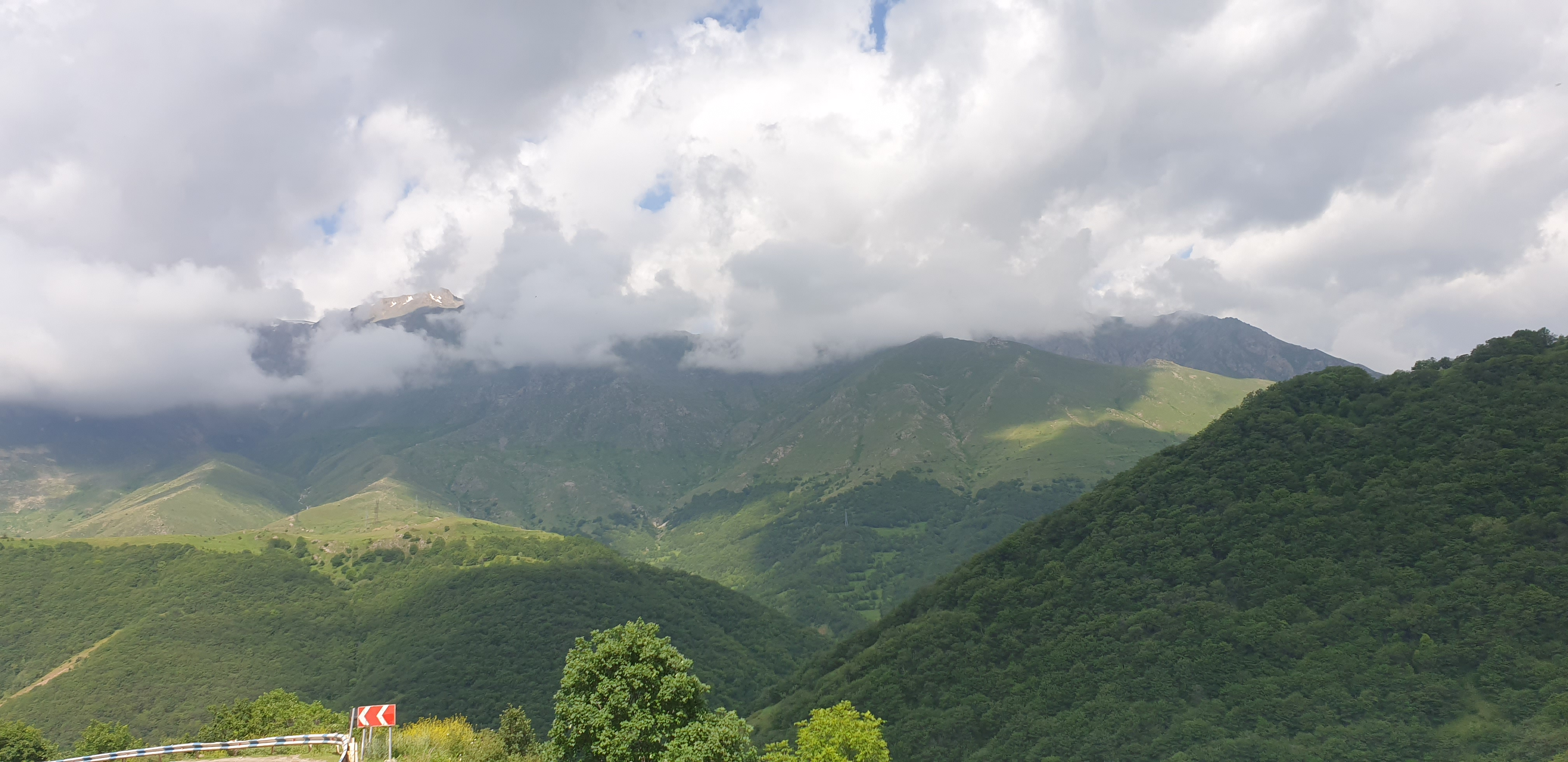
National park "Arevik"

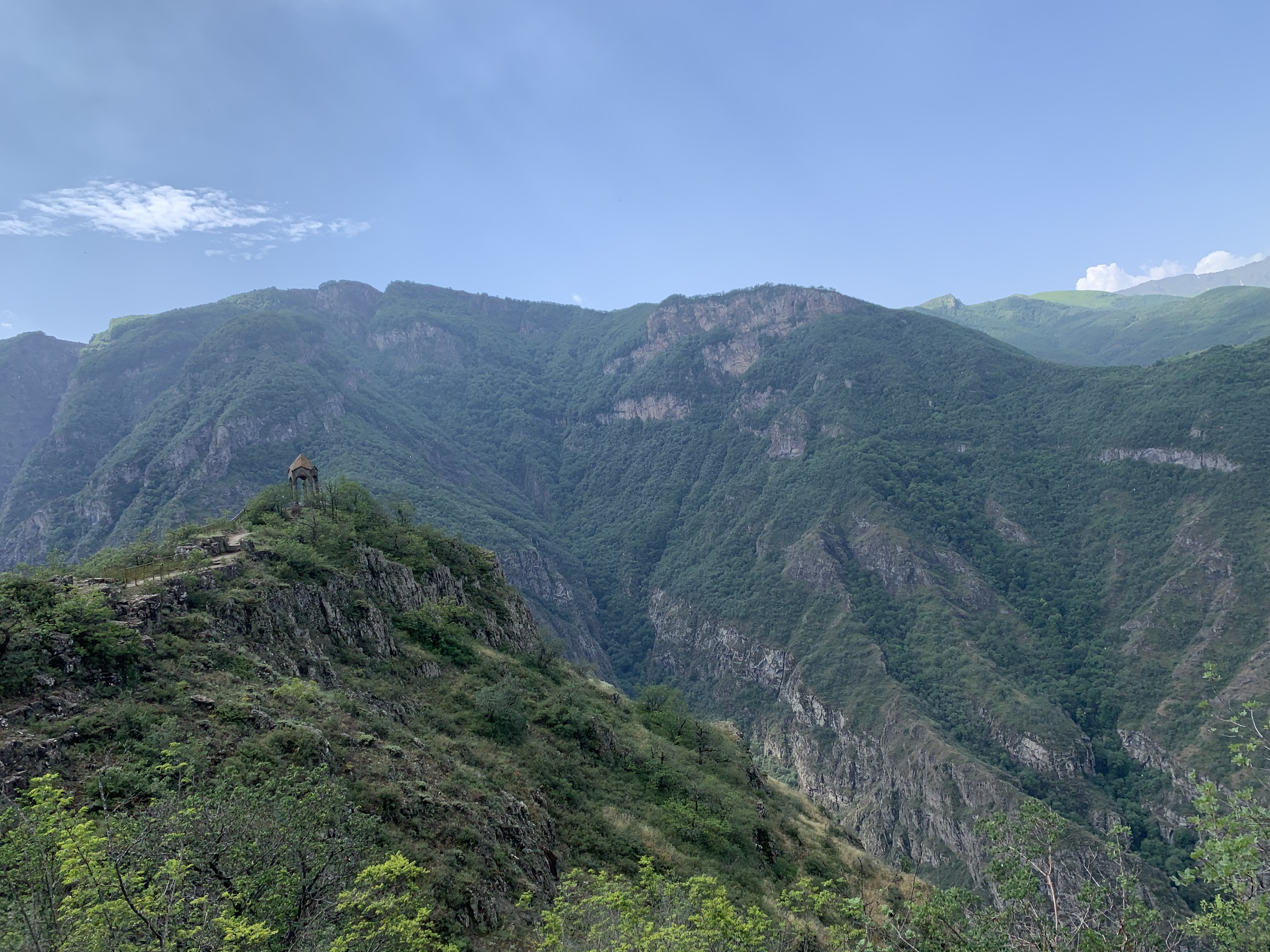
Near Alidzor

== Culture ==
=== Fortresses and archaeological sites ===
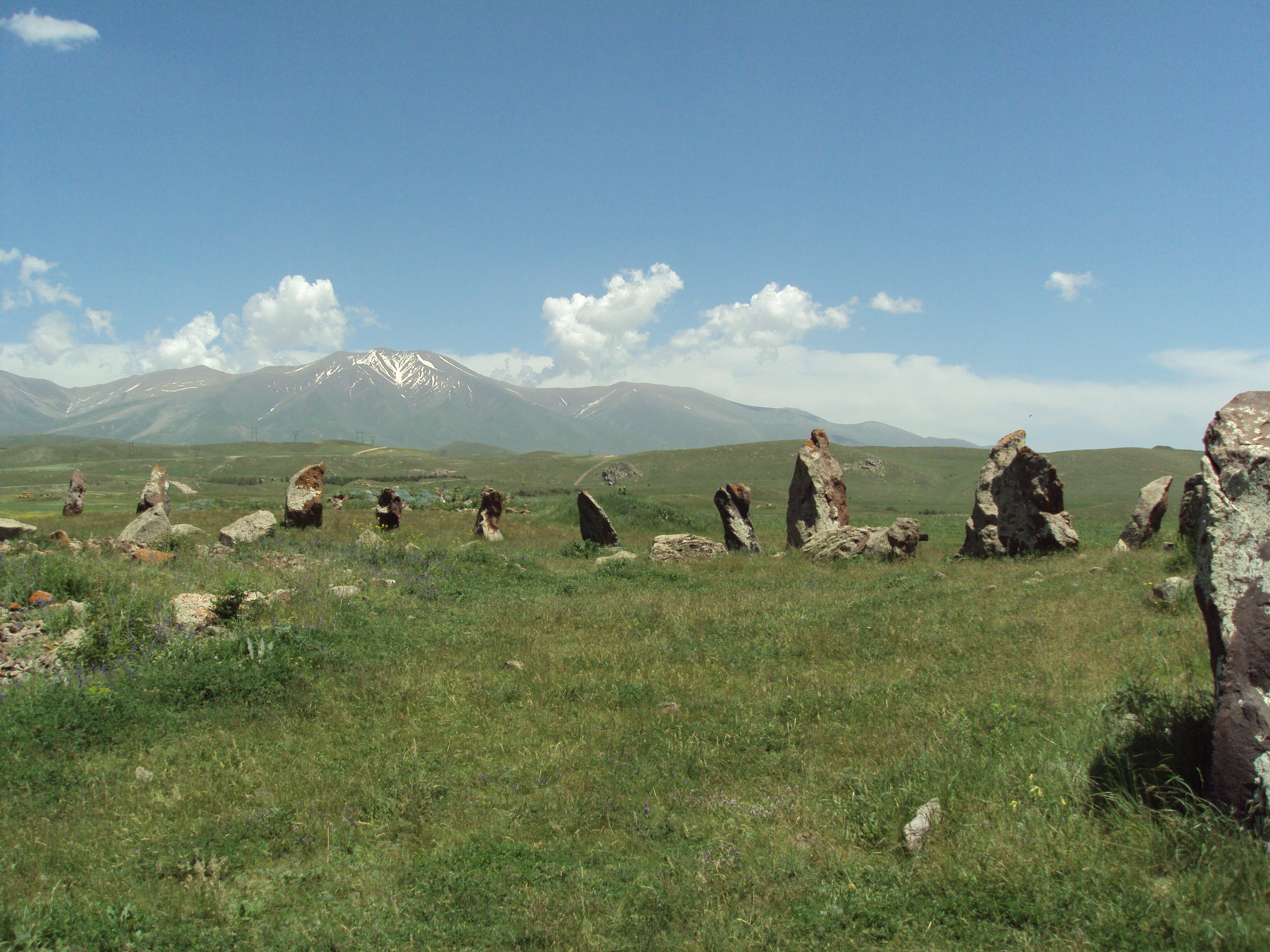
Zorats Karer

Near the village of Angeghakot in the Sisian Municipality is located the prehistoric site of Godedzor that goes back to about 4000 BC.This was an important centre for obsidian trade in Syunik obsidian. It had links with the sites located as far as Lake Urmia in Iran such as Yanik Tepe and Dalma Tepe.

The sites of interest in this area include,

- Zorats Karer prehistoric archaeological site, is believed by many scientists including Paris Herouni and Onik Khnkikyan to be a prehistoric astronomical observatory,
- Baghaberd fortress of the 4th century,
- Vorotnaberd fortress of the 5th century,
- Meghri Fortress of the 11th century,
- Halidzor Fortress of the 17th century,
- the artificial caves of Khndzoresk.

=== Churches and monasteries ===
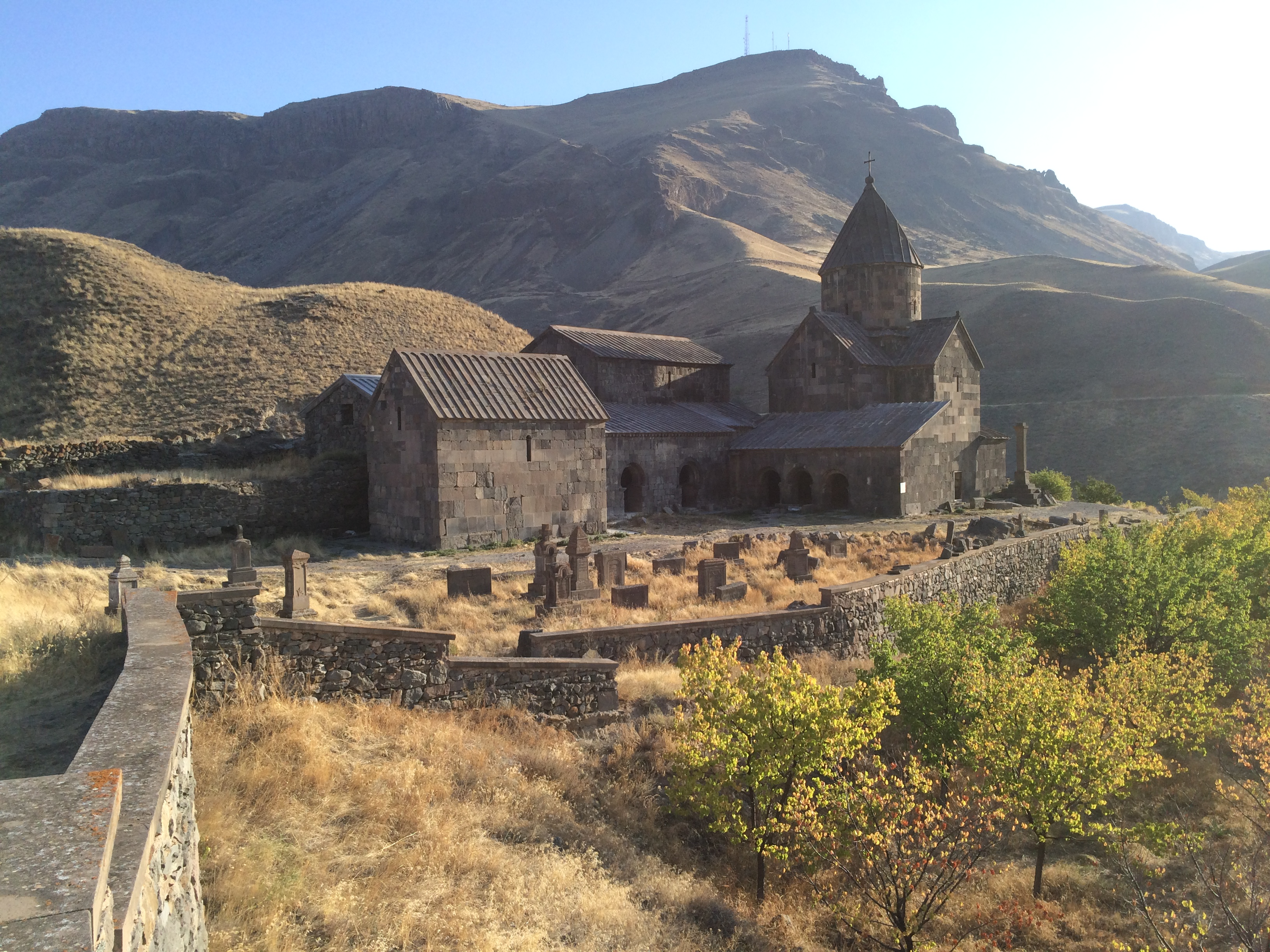
Vorotnavank monastery

- Surp Hovhannes Monastery of 691 of Sisian.
- Tatev monastery of the 9th century.
- Vorotnavank monastic complex of the 10th century.
- Vahanavank monastic complex of the 10th century.
- Bgheno-Noravank monastery of the 11th century.
- Tatevi Anapat monastic complex of the 17th century.

== Economy ==
=== Agriculture ===
Around 74% (3,336 km^{2}) of the total area of the province are arable lands, out of which 13.2% (440 km^{2}) are ploughed.

The rural population is mainly involved in agriculture and cattle-breeding. The province contributes 6.5% of the annual agricultural product of Armenia. The main crops are grains, dry grains, potatoes and vegetables.

The village of Angeghakot has fish farming ponds, while the village of Achanan is home to a poultry farm.

=== Industry ===
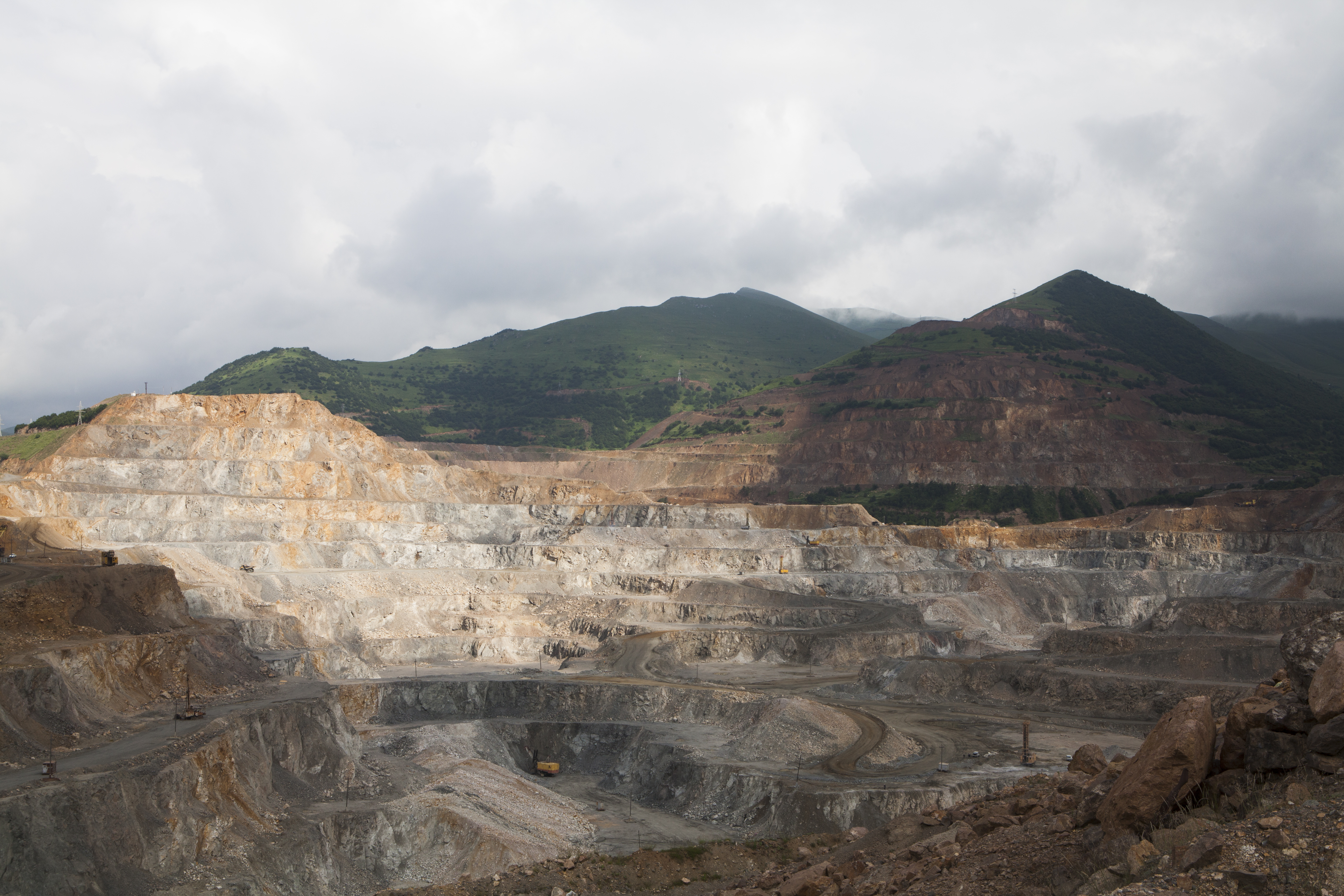
The open-pit copper-molybdenum mine of Kajaran

Syunik is among the main contributing provinces in the industrial sector of Armenia. It has a share of 17% of the annual total industrial product of Armenia. The economy is of the province is mainly based on the industrial sector, including mining, building materials production and food-processing. The prospect of a uranium mine being exploited by the Russian State Nuclear Energy Corporation (Rosatom) in the village of Lernadzor.

- The province is home to many of Armenia's largest mining operations including the Kapan mine and Kajaran Mine operated by the Zangezur Copper and Molybdenum Combine since 1951, based in Kajaran. The town of Kajaran is also home to the "Danesia" company for roofing sheets founded in 2000.
- Kapan is home to a number of industrial firms operating in the industrial district of the town. The largest firms are the "Kapan CH.SH.SH." for building materials founded in 1947, the Kapan machine tools plant founded in 1972, the "Sonatex" knitting factory founded in 1985, and the "Marila LLC" for meat and dairy products founded in 2010.
- Goris is home to the Vorotan Hydropower Plant opened in 1989 and considered one of the main providers of electrical power in Armenia. Other large industrial firms in Goris include the "Vosmar" company for asphalt concrete and crushed stone founded in 2002, the "Goris Gamma" for electronic devices founded in 2003, and the "Goris Group" for bottled spring water founded in 2005.
- Sisian is home to the "Sis-Alp" dairy factory founded in 2007, the "Bazalt-M" building materials production plant founded in 2009, and the Sisian ceramics plant operating since 2014.
- The Meghri Cannery founded in 1930, and the Meghri Road-building enterprise for asphalt and concrete production founded in 1997, are also among the major industrial firms of the province. Meghri used to have a large wine factory during the Soviet years.
- The Agarak Copper-Molybdenum mine complex produces copper and molybdenum concentrate through bulk-selective flotation recovery of molybdenum and copper minerals. It was fully acquired by "GeoProMining" company in 2007.
- The village of Shamb is home to the "Tatni Mineral Water Factory" founded in 2010, while Norashenik is home to the Freedom Distillery for fruit vodka products opened in 2014.

=== Tourism ===
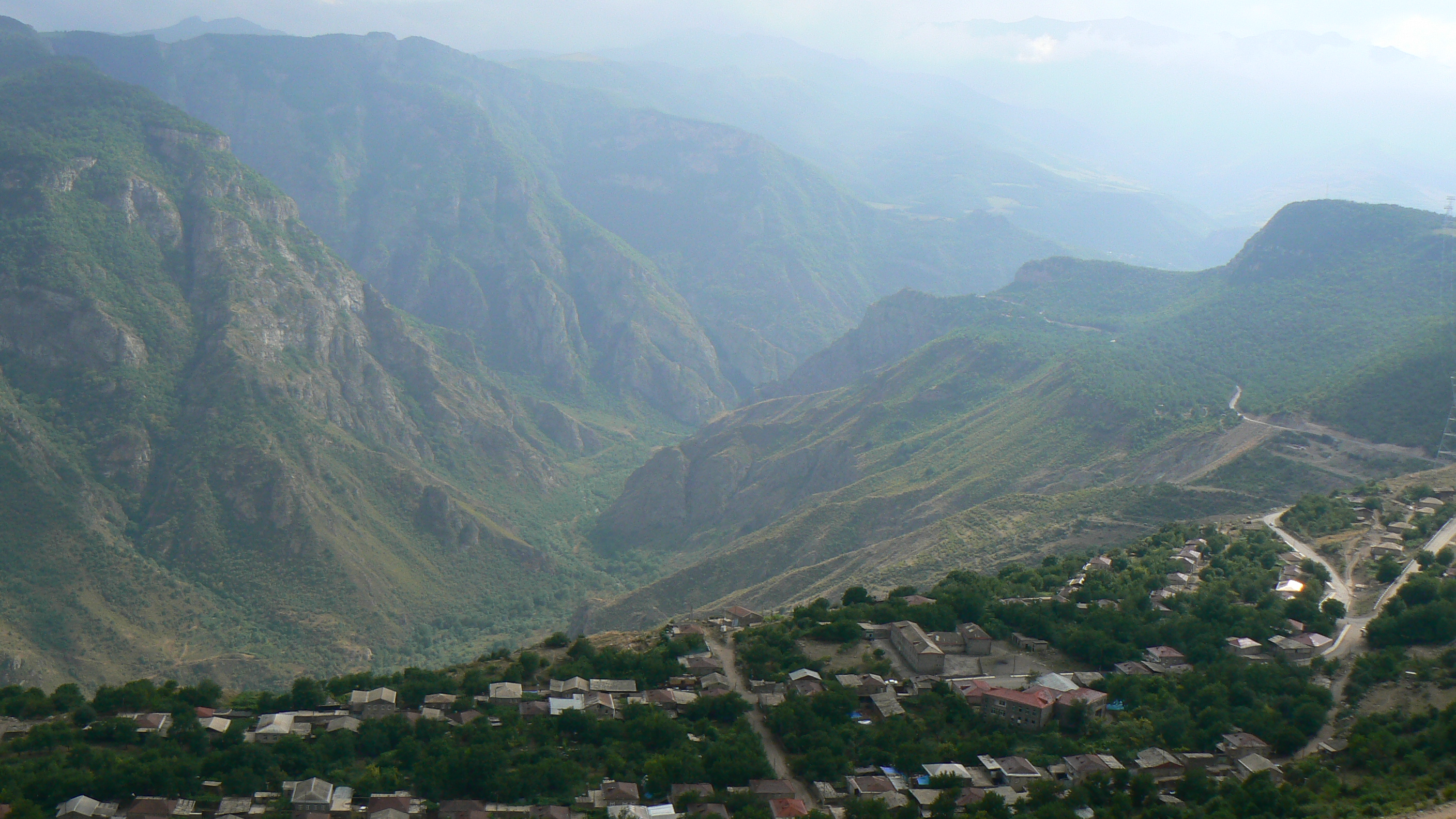
The view from the Wings of Tatev cableway

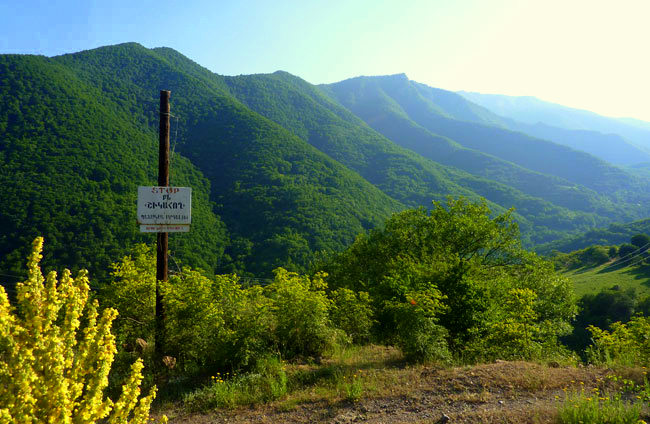
Shikahogh State Reserve

Tourism is among the developing sectors in the economy of Syunik. The towns of Goris and Kapan have a large number of different levels of hotels and inns.

The cultural heritage, as well as the natural beauty of the region attract many local and foreign tourists especially in the summer period. The Wings of Tatev (Armenian: Տաթևի թևեր Tatevi tever) cableway, operating since 16 October 2010 between Halidzor and the Tatev monastery, is the longest reversible aerial tramway built in only one section, and holds the record for Longest non-stop double track cable car with the length of 5.7 km (3.5 mi).

Many forests and woodlands of Syunik are among the protected areas of Armenia such as the Arevik National Park and Shikahogh State Reserve. The province has also the wildlife sanctuaries of Boghakar, Goris, Sev Lake, Zangezur and the Plane Grove of Shikahogh river.

Other touristic destinations of Syunik include the Mount Khustup and the Shaki Waterfall.

== Education ==
Syunik is home to the Goris State University operating since 1967 in the town of Goris.

Branches of the Yerevan State University, National Polytechnic University of Armenia and Yerevan State Institute of Theatre and Cinematography are also operating in the province.

As of the 2015–16 educational year, Syunik has 119 schools.

== Sport ==
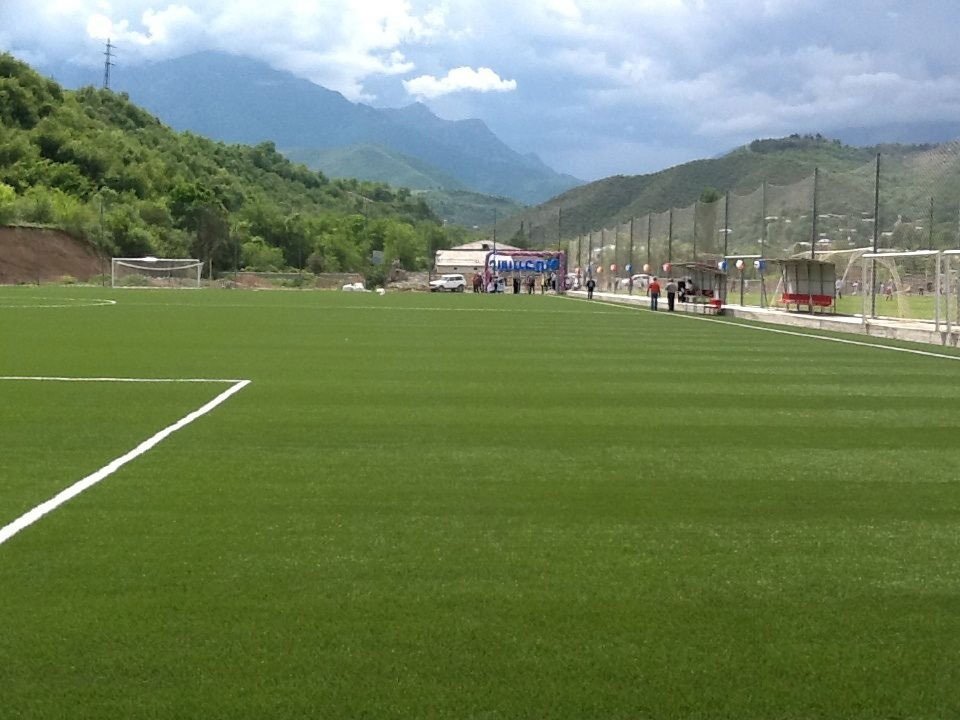
Gandzasar Kapan Training Centre

Football is the most popular sport in the province. FC Gandzasar Kapan represents Syunik at the Armenian Premier League. Gandzasar Stadium in Kapan is the largest sports venue of Syunik. Minor stadiums also exit in Meghri, Goris and Sisian.

In 2013, FC Gandzasar Kapan opened its state-of-the-art training centre to become the only football training academy in southern Armenia. The centre has several full-sized football pitches including one with artificial turf.

Previously, FC Zangezour of Goris was another important football team in the province. However, the team was dissolved in 1997 due to financial difficulties.

== Notable people ==
- Aram Manukian, statesman, founder of the Republic of Armenia
- Aksel Bakunts, novelist
- Versand Hakobyan, oligarch and politician
- Sero Khanzadyan, novelist
- Baghdasar Arzoumanian, architect
- Oksen Mirzoyan, weightlifter, Olympic and World champion

== Gallery ==
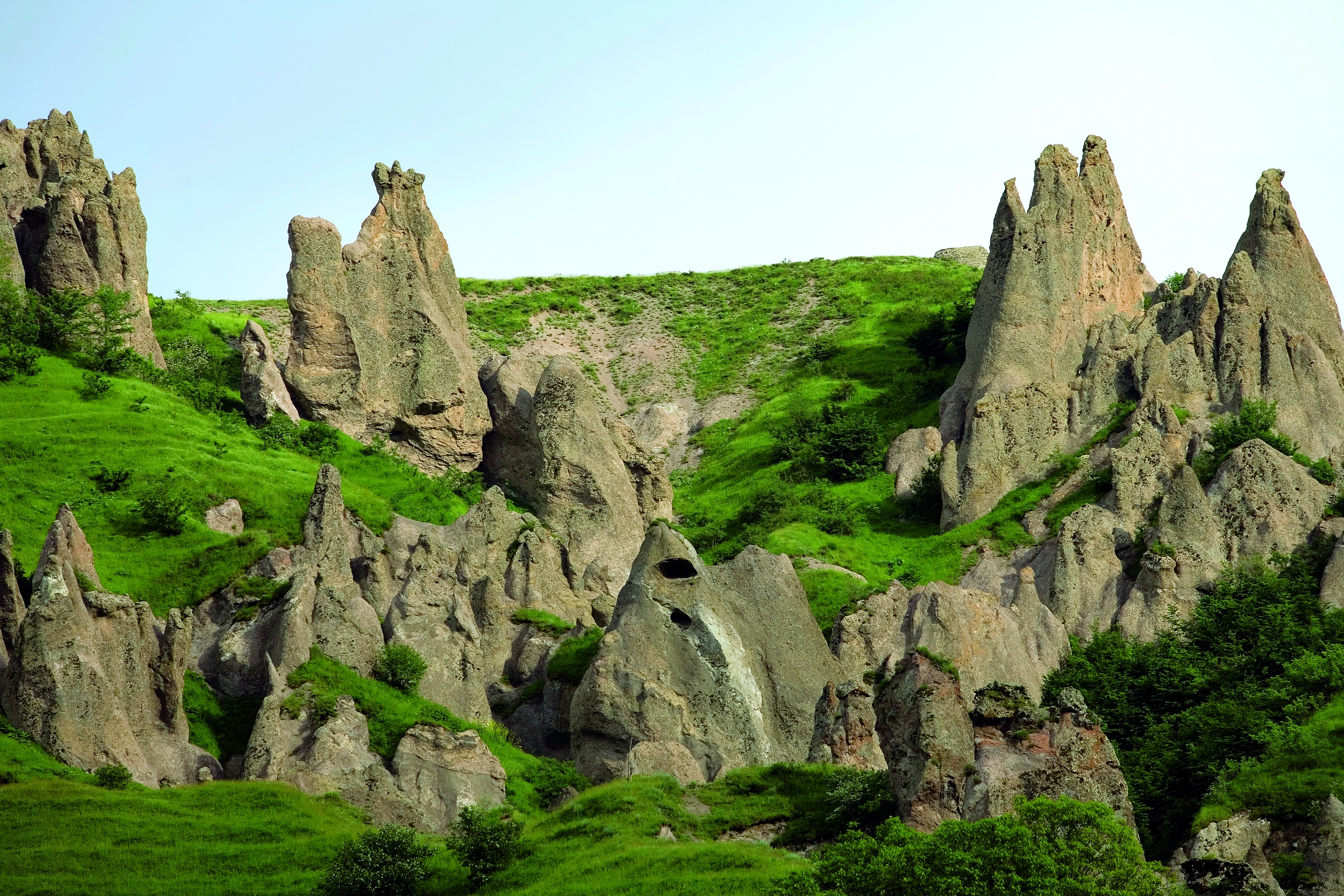
The "stone-pyramids" of Goris

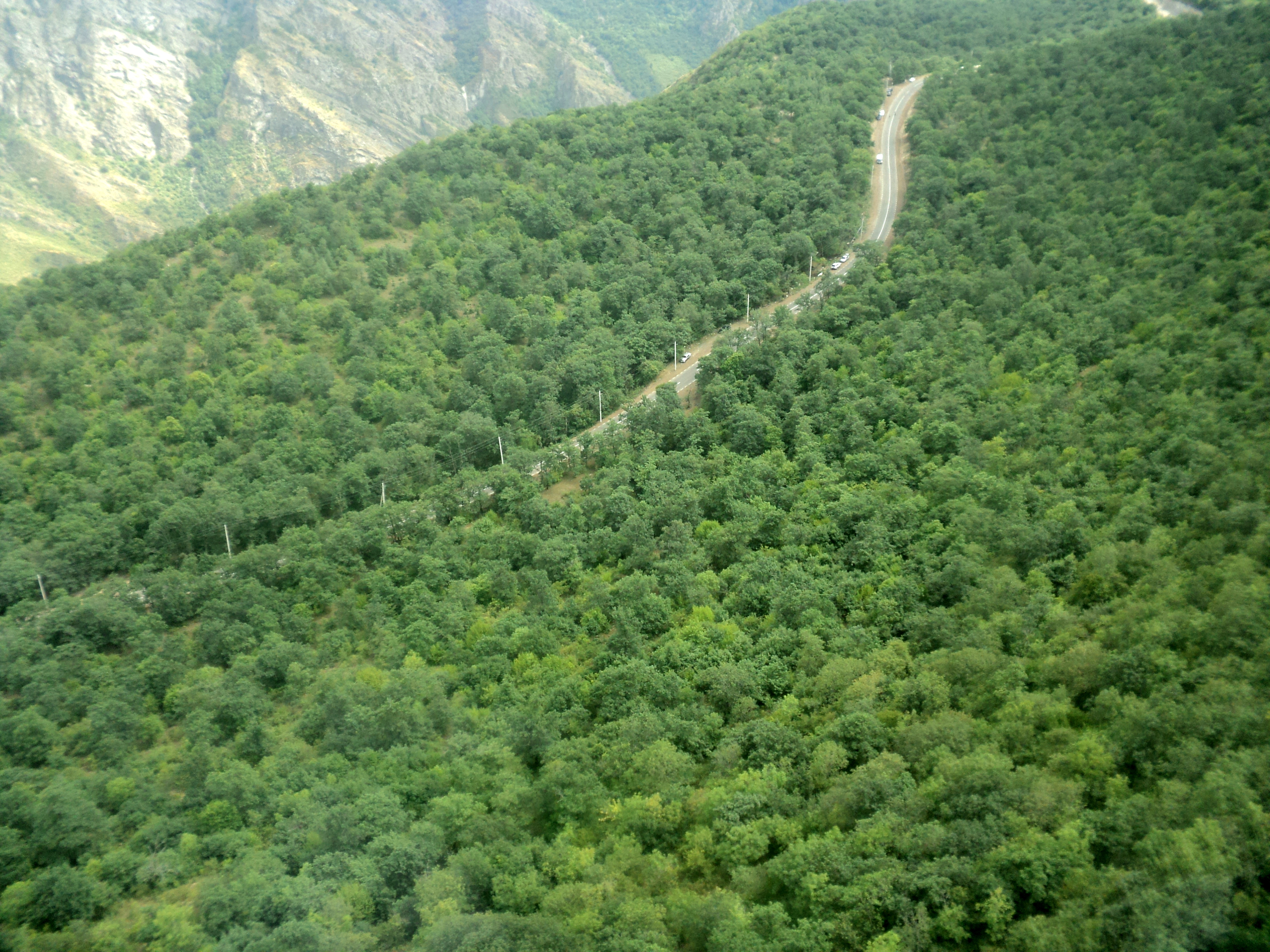
Zangezur Sanctuary

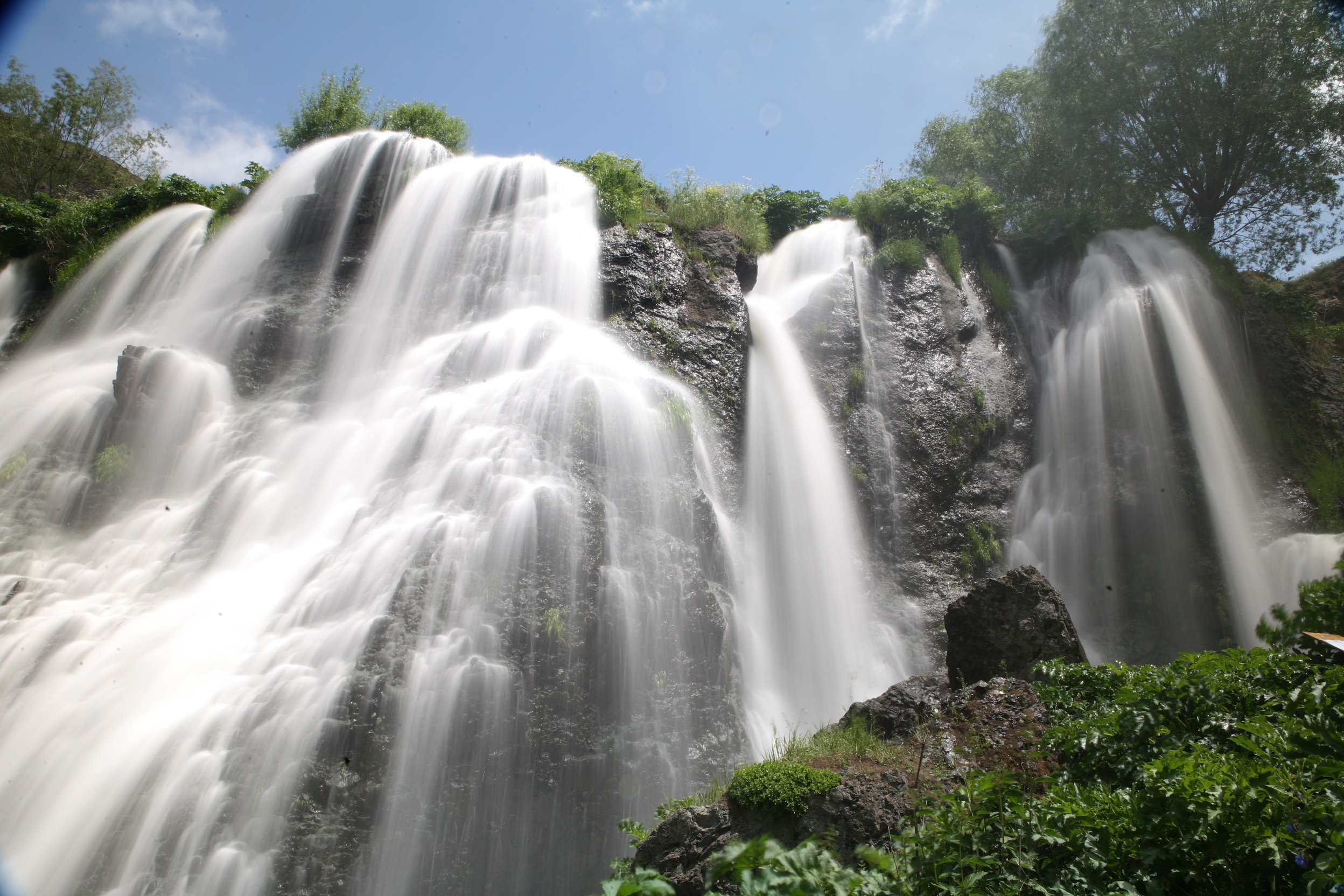
Shaki Waterfall

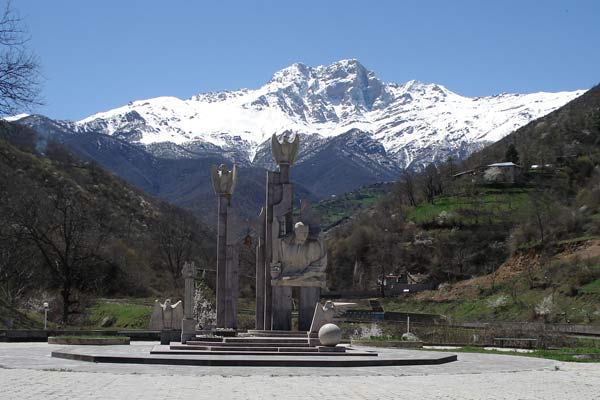
Monument to Garegin Nzhdeh and mount Khustup near Kapan

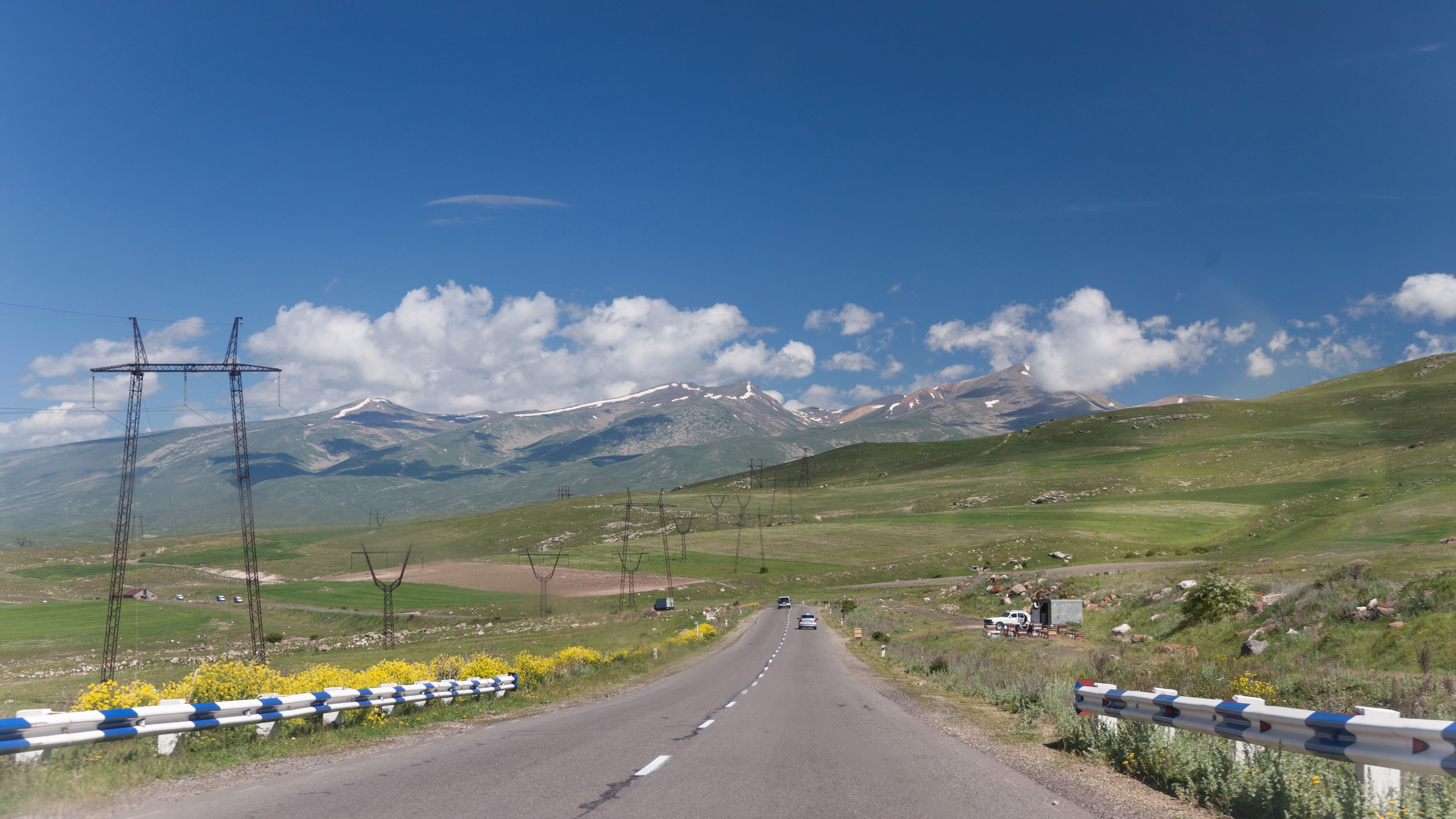
The landscape as seen from the M-2 Motorway between Goris and Shaki

== See also ==
- Injevar
- Jibillu
- Kaler, Armenia
- Kefashen
- Kavart
- Pirdaudan
- Siunia dynasty
- Syunik (historic province)
- Kingdom of Syunik
- Vank
- Verin Hand
- Verin Vachagan
