= Archaeological heritage of Armenia =

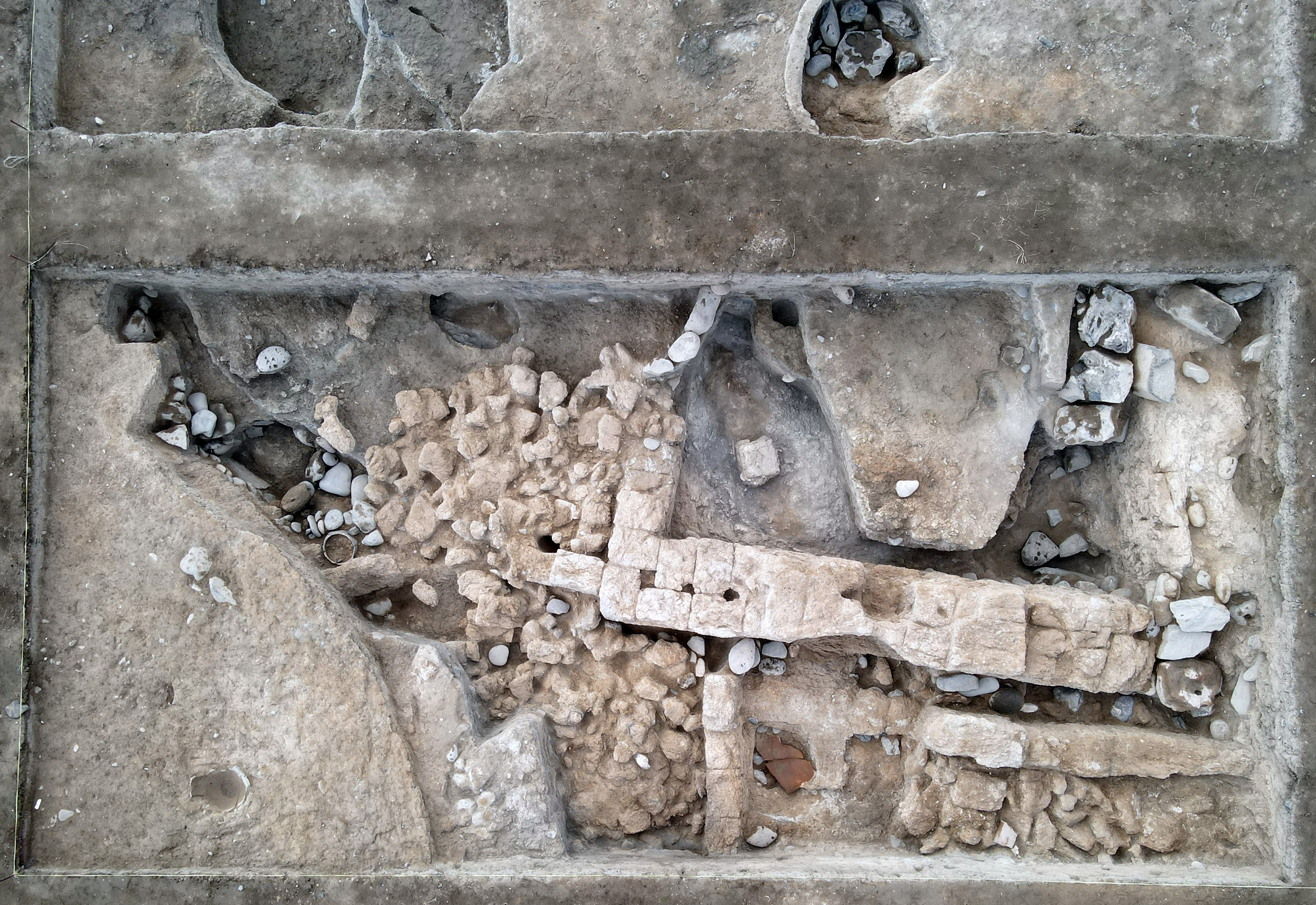
Shengavit

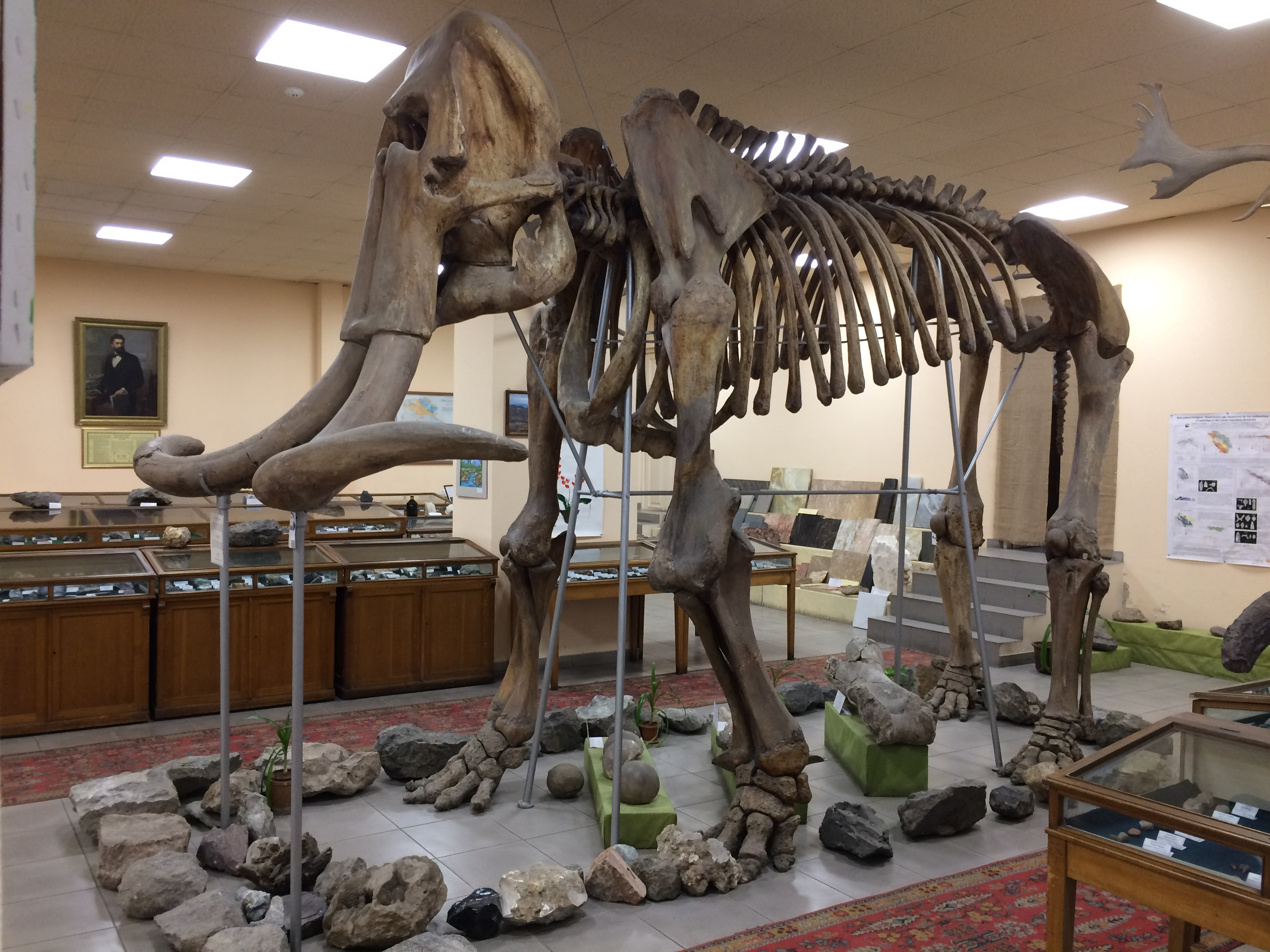
Steppe mammoth fossils at the Geological Museum of Armenia

2.6 million years before present (hereinafter-Myr) the Hominids called Homo habilis living in East Africa, made ancient stone tools called choppers by chipping the edges of river stones. From that moment the Lower Paleolithic (Old Stone Age) culture began.

== Paleolithic Armenia ==
The diverse landscape of the Armenian Highland was exceptionally favorable for the habitation of hominids of the Paleolithic Homo species. Here the necessary raw materials for the creation of stone tools were available: andesite, dacite, obsidian, as well as a rich variety of hunting animals and vegetable food, including wide variety of poaceae family plants, countless fresh springs, rivers and creeks, which fulfilled the demand for drinking water anywhere in the Highland.

In the last decades, several dozen sites of the Early Old Stone Age (Black Cross, Kurtan, etc.), and ancient assemblages of stone tools (Oldowan and Acheulian type of choppers, sharp edges tools, massive hand cutters with bilateral finishing) have been discovered in the north of Armenia. The results of uranium-lead isotope decomposition indicate, that the absolute age of the early Acheulian cultural layers is 1,85-1,77 Myr. These are the oldest evidences of the existence of Homo erectus in the Eurasian vast region. In the late Acheulian (500-300 thousand years before present, hereinafter - Thyr) Armenia, tools (bifaces), hand axes, were found, made of double-sided pieces of obsidian and dacite, leaf-shaped, with sharp, symmetrical edges, the thick part of the base of the tools adapted to the human palm. To the North of Armenia, in the foothills of the volcanic Javahk mountain range, around 30 ancient sites of the Old Stone Age were discovered: Blagodarnoe, Noramut, etc., in one of which a cultural layer was uncovered, which contained not only bifaces, but also the entire collection of their preparatory materials: cores, flakes, blades and other small items, that testify the complete cycle of tool making at the site. The regular shapes, fine transverse section and careful finishing of the cutting edges of the Acheulian hand-axes made of dacite, indicate, that their main group dates back to the Late Acheulian epoch (500-250 Thyr).

Late Acheulian finds were also discovered in the Hrazdan river valley (Arzni, Nurnus, Satani Dar, Erkar Blur, Gutanasar, Jraber, Hatis, etc.), on the southwestern slopes of Artin Mountain and the Aragats massif (Satani Dar, Dashtadem). The number of tools made by the Neanderthals, the most advanced of the hominids found in the Late Acheulian and Middle Paleolithic (250-40 Thyr) Armenia, reaches to thousands. In the middle phase of the Lower Paleolithic period, the Neanderthals lived in caves near rivers (Yerevan 1, Lusakert 1–2, Arzni, Hovk, Kalavan, Aghitu, etc.) and in high plateaus (southern slopes of Aragats: Dashtadem, Arteni, Syunik –at the foot of Amulsar and elsewhere). The Expedition of the Research Center of Historical and Cultural Heritage discovered late Acheulian bifaces in 2012–2021, in the south of the Republic of Armenia, in Syunik region, at the headwaters of Vorotan, on a plateau 2200–2300 m above the sea level. Throughout the whole 5 km long and 2–3 km wide upland area there are tens of thousands of obsidian cores, tools, rubble and fragments typical of the Late Acheulian, Middle and Upper Palaeolithic era.

Armenia is one of those places where in 120- 100 Thyr inhabitation processes took place (Nor Geghi 1, Aghavnatun, Bagratashen). In the Late Stone Age, 60-40 Thyr a number of caves were inhabited (Yerevan 1, Lusakert, Barozh). During the last (Vyrumyan) glacial period, there were harsh climatic conditions in the Armenian Highland, as a result of which the traces of human-Homo Sapiens activities are small in number (Aghitu - 35-24 Thyr and Kalavan 1 - 18-16 Thyr).

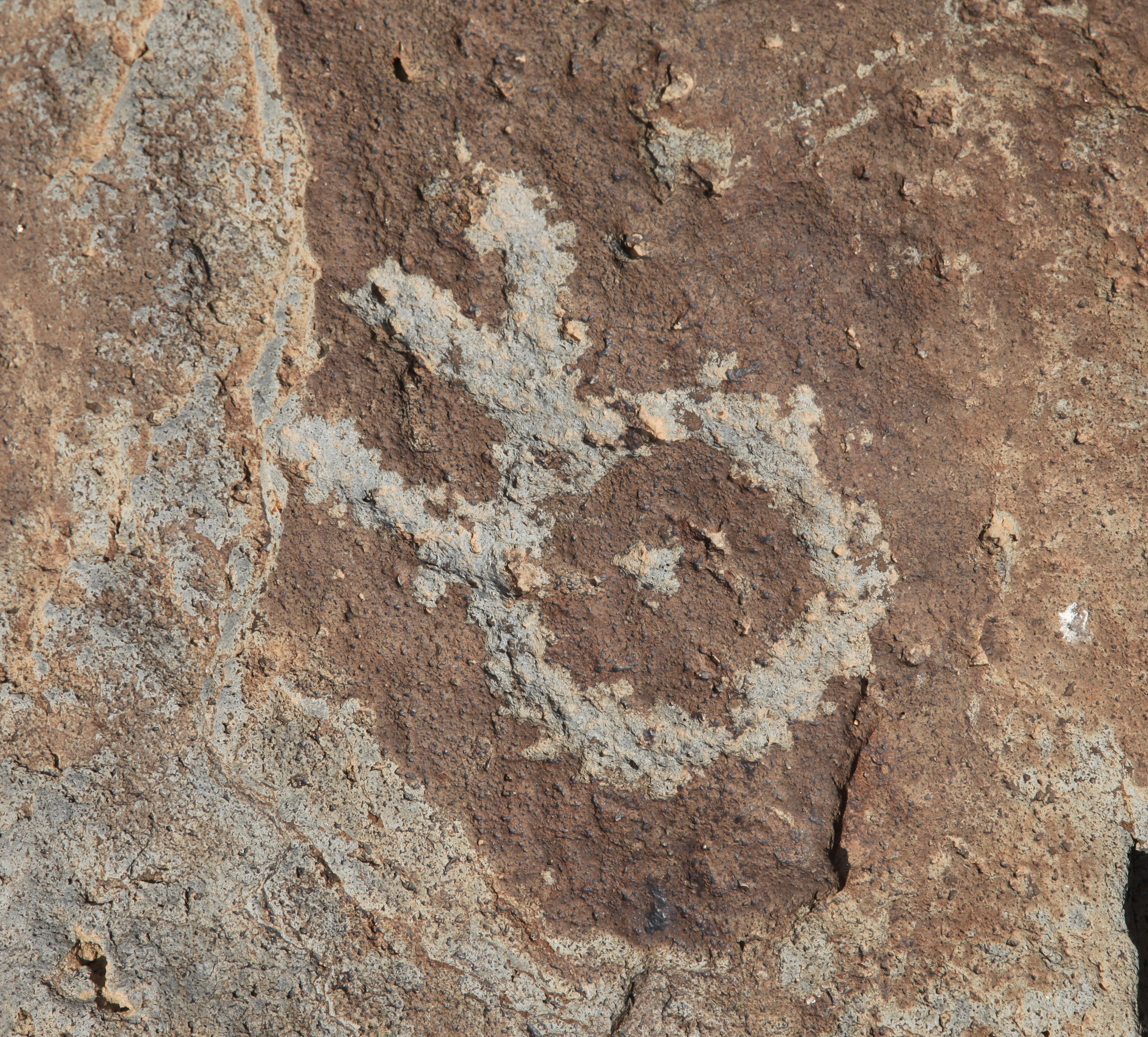
Muradasar, comet

== Neolithic and Chalcolithic (Aeneolitic) Periods in Armenia ==
In 12 thousand years before present, after the end of the (Vyurmyan) Ice Age and the melting of the glaciers along the eastern coast of the Mediterranean - in the Levant, on the slopes of the Eastern Taurus Mountains and in the northern Mesopotamia, which were rich in hunting animals and poaceae family plants, the hunter-gatherer groups began to cultivate these plants and tame animals. The territory stretching from Eastern Taurus up to the Greater Caucasus Range, which separates the Middle East from the Eurasian Steppe, is an environment of sharp relief variations, cut by high mountain ranges. At its center the Armenian Highland is located, the favorable climatic conditions of which enabled the local inhabitants to continue their hunting and gathering lifestyle, at the same time being engaged in animal husbandry and food cultivation.

The presence of exceptionally rich resources of obsidian in the Highland predetermined the culture of Armenia in the Neolithic period (New Stone Age). The obsidian in Arteni, Hatis and Nemrut mountains, in the Vorotan river basin, Kotayk plateau and in other mines was not only processed in the local area, but was also exported in large quantities to neighboring regions, particularly to south-west Asia. A huge number of artifacts were made from obsidian: agricultural and production tools, ritual objects, weapons and jewelry. In Mesopotamia and in other valley regions, the bartering of highly demanded obsidian and primitive trade facilitated the accumulation of wealth and economic stratification among communities and later among larger social units. One of the important routes was the movement of the Syunik obsidian from the ancient site of Godedzor to the basin of Lake Urmia and to other valley regions of the Ubaid culture.

About 7000 years BC a groups of settlements were formed in the Ararat valley, near the left-bank tributaries of the Araks River. Among them are the monuments Aratashen, Masis Blur (hill) and Aknashen, which were investigated within the framework of international archeological programs. These sites, especially Aknashen, are connected with the Shulaveri–Shomu culture that flourished in South Caucasus from about 6000 BC onward.

These late Neolithic villages consisted of densely built clusters of houses and of other structures. The majority of buildings built of clay and mud (unfired) bricks had a round or oval floorplan. The inhabitants cultivated several types of wheat, barley and lentils, raised sheep, goats and cattle, were engaged in hunting and fishing. The excavations resulted in the discovery of a large number of artefacts skillfully made from obsidian, river stone, bone, antler and shell, which were used for processing wood and fur and sewing clothes from wool and leather. Two important productions were introduced into Armenia's late Neolithic economy: pottery and copper mining. The latter was one of the first steps of mankind in metal processing. In the 6th millennium BC collections, the local rough products dominated.

High-quality, colorful vessels were also found, belonging to the Halaf style and were probably imported from Northern Mesopotamia. The jewelries, mainly beads, were also made of copper and became the first metal artefacts known to us (Choyunyu tepesi). Copper jewelries and artistic pottery led to the development of a new type of long-distance trade. Specialized craft centers now became important raw material supplying regions.

== The Chalcolithic (also Eneolithic) period ==
The Chalcolithic (or Eneolithic) period in South-West Asia began in 5500-5200 BC and lasted for about two millennia until 3500 BC. It is characterized by the development of coppersmithing, although stone tools were still dominant in the economy.

In the last four decades, many Chalcolithic settlements were discovered throughout the territory of modern Armenia. Four of which- Adablur and Teghut in the Ararat Valley, Areni-1 in Vayots Dzor, Godedzor in Syunik, have been partially excavated. All of them date back to 4500-3400 BC. Teghut was a small herders’ village involved in animal husbandry, consisting of semi-earthen, round floorplan huts. High quality pottery, as well as copper tools imported from other places, were found here. Adablur was obviously bigger. This settlement consisted of large, multi-room complexes that stretched along the streets. Remains of workshops and clay sculptures were found here.

The dry environment and stable temperature of the Areni- 1 cave in the Arpa river gorge created excellent conditions for the preservation of organic materials. Grain, fruit, cloth, leather and even grass, that were usually not preserved elsewhere, led us into an unknown world of artifacts, created during the Chalcolithic period. Unique is the oldest known winepress in the world, dating back to 4000 BC and the ancient leather shoe dating back to 3600 BC, found in the depth of the Areni cave. Godedzor is located in an area of high mountain, alpine pastures. It was an important checkpoint and exchange center for mobile herdsman. Here, was accumulated the obsidian, brought from the mines located on the distance of two or three days’ walk, and was then exported. The signs on the seals that were put on clay, testify the existence of private, most likely family property marking tradition.

== Armenia in the Early Bronze Age (3500-2400 BC) ==
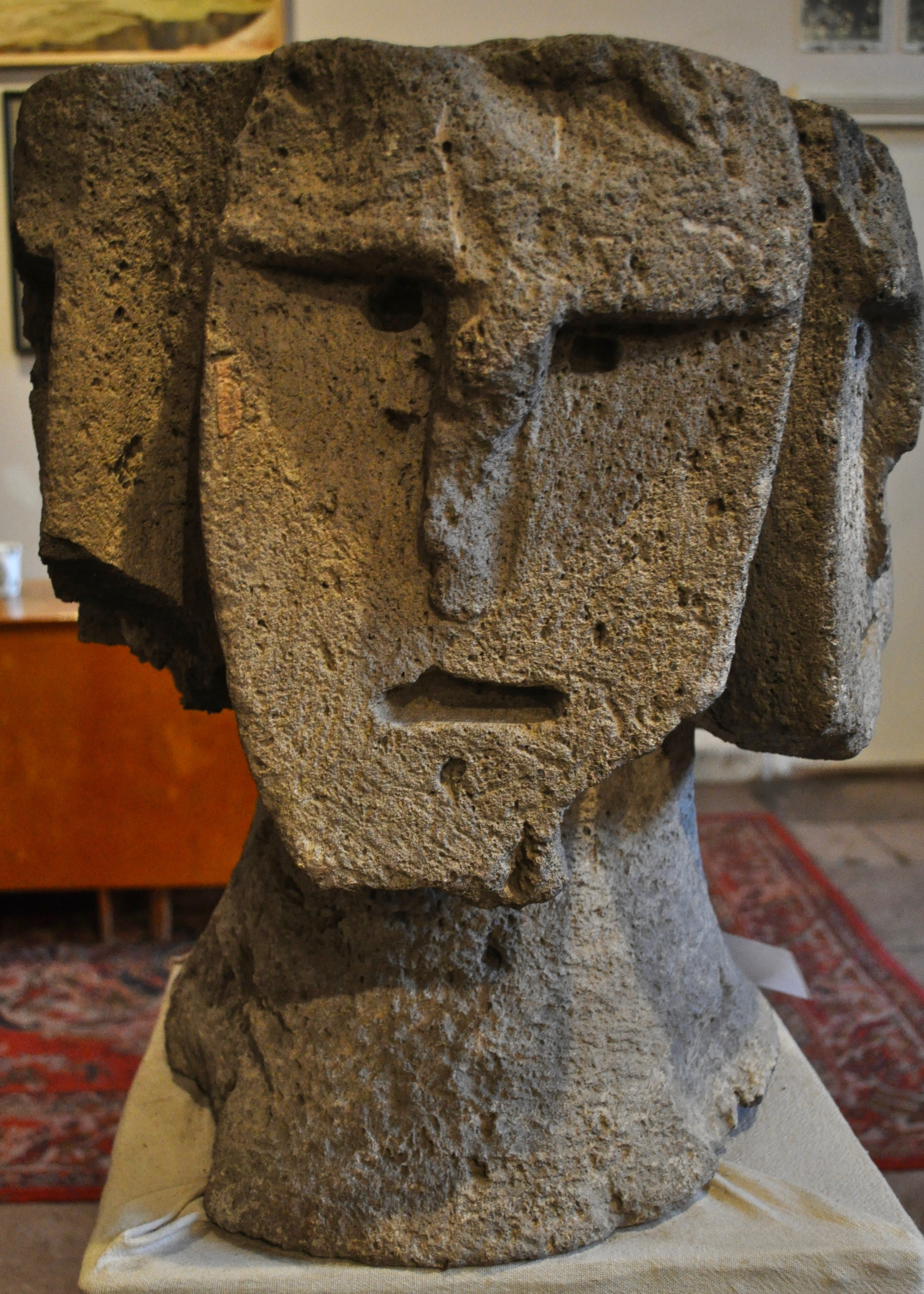
Five-faced idol, 2nd millennium B.C., Harzhis village

In the middle of the IV millennium BC, a unique culture was formed in Armenia, as well as some adjacent areas, which became known in archaeology as the Kura–Araxes culture. The earliest evidence for this culture is found on the Ararat plain. It survived for more than a millennium and, developing, covered a vast territory extending from the North Caucasus (Chechnya) to Israel (Dead Sea), from Eastern Asia Minor (Amid) to Central Iran (Godin Tepe) having the Armenian Highland at its core -particularly the Ararat valley and the foothills near it.

The Armenian civilization, attested in the territories of 12 modern states, is known to the scientific world under various names. Among which, the most widespread are the denominations Kur-Araks (Kura–Araxes) and Shengavit. This civilization is characterized by an agricultural sedentary economy, with more than a thousand settlements densely covering the fertile riverside valleys, high plateaus and high mountain zones of the Armenian Highland and neighbouring regions.

The Early Bronze Age artificial hill-settlements were characterized by multiple cultural layers, which in some places spread to tens of meters (Mokhrablur of Nakhijevan, Norsun-Tepe). The economy was based on irrigated agriculture and cattle raising. Probably, it was at this period, that the huge irrigation systems built on the slopes of Aragats and Geghama mountains were formed and at the sources of canals, artificial water pools and springs, huge dragon stones (vishapakar) made from onepiece basalt, typical of Armenian culture, were erected. Extremely plentiful were the flint inserts for sickles, work tools made of bone, obsidian and river stones.

Another prerequisite for unprecedented economic development was copper production. A large number of weapon and tools made of arsenical bronze are attested by both the finds treasures near Yerevan and the stone and clay molds found in various ancient sites of Shengavit civilization (Shengavit, Margahovit, etc.). In the Shengavit ancient site, weight standards, similar to those used in the Levant, were found, which testify the Armenia's involvement in the newly formed international trade relations in the Early Bronze Age. Diverse types of weapons are found: arrows, daggers, battle axes, spears and other weapons made of obsidian, flint, bone and bronze.

Mudbrick architecture was characteristic of this culture. The mudbrick made from sandy clay, with the help of mold forms and dried in the sun, was the main building material from which walls, temples, residential and economic buildings, hydro-engineering structures were built. The foundations of the houses were made of river stones, cracked or unprocessed basalt (Shengavit, Harich, Karaz, Amiranisgora, etc.), on which mudbrick walls were raised. Round buildings with a diameter of 4–10 m and rectangular floorplan were widespread. The latter had a flat, log roof, and the buildings with round floorplan had primitive roofs of “hazarashen” type, covered with clay mudbricks with reed, with a skylights hole in the centre of the roof, that solved the issues of light and ventilation of the house (Shengavit, Mokhrablur).

The floors were of rammed earth. There were also plaster covered, up to 10 cm thick (Shengavit) and red painted (Garakepek-Tepe) floors. There are found samples of attempts to enliven the monotonous clay walls with decoration and with shaped arrangement of bricks of different color and to enlighten the monotonous appearance of the walls with various colors (Shengavit, Mokhrablur in Nakhijevan, Yanik-tepe, etc.).

Among the settlements with an area of 1-10 ha, the central ones were surrounded by fortified walls built of stone (Shengavit, Garni, Persi, Khorenia-Javakhk) and of mud-brick (Mokhrablur, Goy-tepe, Gudaberteke), with artificial puddles (Norabats, Kvatskhelebi, Khizannat-gora). Noteworthy is the fortified wall of Shengavit with its stone foundations, reinforced with rectangular masonry walls and a tiled secret passage leading to Hrazdan river. The central urban areas, which are characterized by dense construction (Shengavit, Mokhrablur, etc.), were surrounded by satellite-residences.

The bearers of the Shengavit culture had a complex religious system. In the central part of the Mokhrablur settlement, in the III construction horizon, a volume-spatial creation was uncovered: a structure-tower with a rectangular plan (7,4x5,5 m) constructed with hard tuff, in the eastern part of which a 3,9 m long one-piece basalt altar was placed. Near this stone structure, clay buildings and ash pits were uncovered, in which the ashes of the sacred hearths had been accumulated. Many tufa idols, clay hearths were excavated in the Shengavit settlement.

In 2012 year a complex cult system was excavated-a room with a rectangular plan, designed specifically for ritual ceremonies, inside which a clay altar was uncovered decorated with relief ornaments on its front. A statue of an idol was affixed into the altar and goblets for libation were placed in front of the heart. To the right from the stairs leading to the semisubterranean room of the shrine, two clay–packed basins were found, in which the ashes from the sacred fire were kept. A phallic pendant-idol was found in the shrine, which was probably the identifying symbol of the priestess. The adjacent room of the complex reflects household activities.

A similar cultic complex was found at the ancient site of Pulur (Sakyol). (This location was later flooded by the Keban Dam). Inside the religious structures, in front of the altars, terracotta cult hearths were located, which were unique to the Shengavit culture, with a diameter of up to one meter, the edges of the inner space resembled a ship bow divided into three parts, the upper platforms were red-painted and decorated with geometric figures. Statuette of women and men, as well as of worship animals, such as horses, bulls and rams were found near these hearths. The horseshoe-shaped mobile shrines with ram protomes, threelegged pedestals, phallus-shaped pendant figures were also of religious nature.

One of the inseparable spheres of religious practice was the burial ritual. Outside the settlements, special burial grounds were formed in their immediate vicinity. Both individual tombs with earthen and tiled walls, as well as wide ancestral tombs with stone walls were revealed, in which the deceased (Joghaz) of the upper-class family were sequentially buried. In the final stage of this civilization, collective burials were performed, in which human sacrifices were also performed. These tombs contain numerous artifacts, that indications of social stratification: gold and silver jewelry, bronze tools and weapons, imported valuable items.

Early city-type settlements, temples, fortified walls, advanced craftsmanship-metallurgy, stonework/masonry, pottery, textile production, wine and beer production, transport, unified weight system, ritually formed system, elite tombs and other features testify the high level of development of the Shengavit civilization.

== Armenia in the Middle Bronze Age (2400/2300-1500 BC) ==
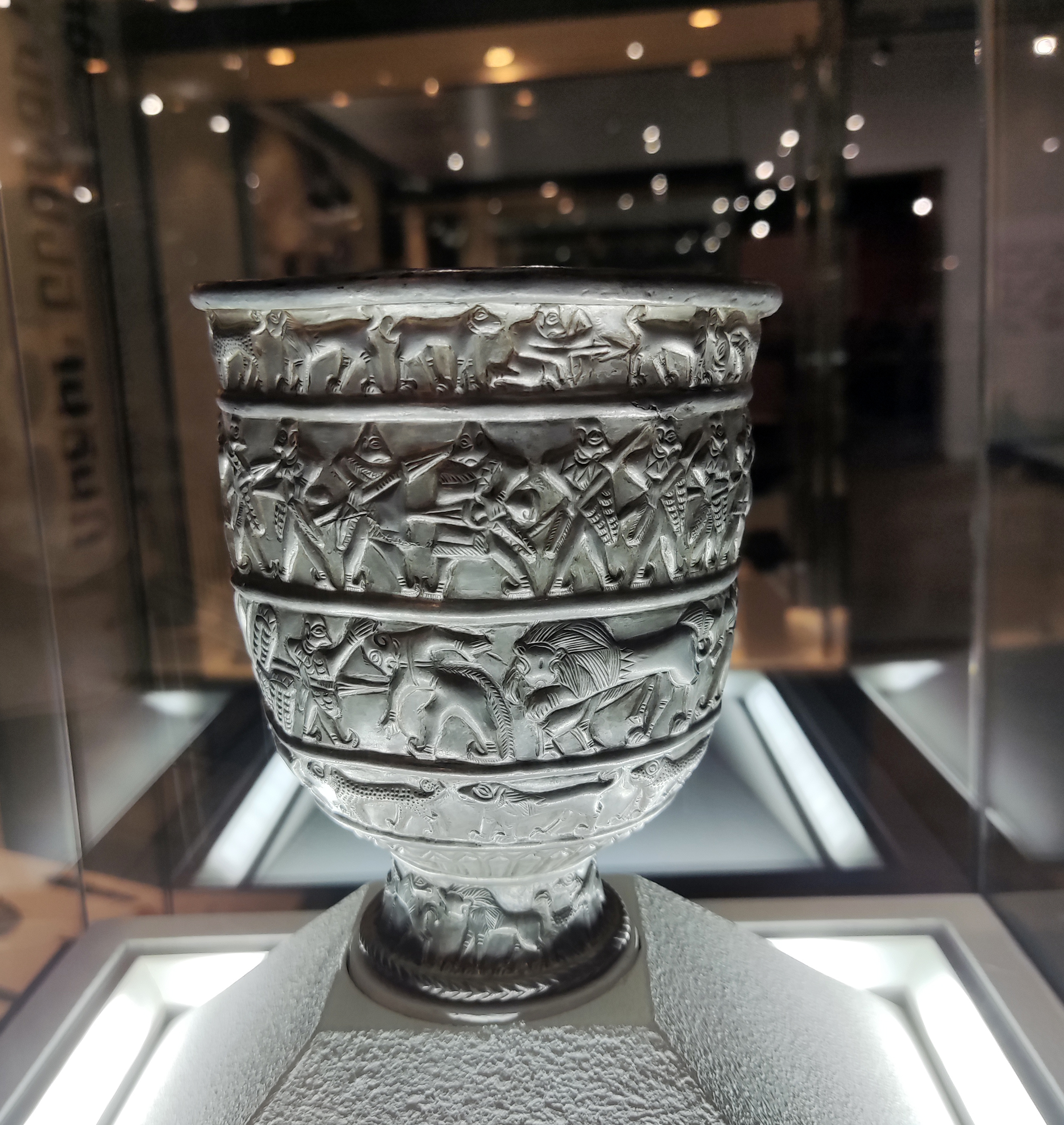
Karashamb goblet, was found in the village of Karashamb, during the excavation of a tomb from the Bronze Age, 22nd–21st century BC.

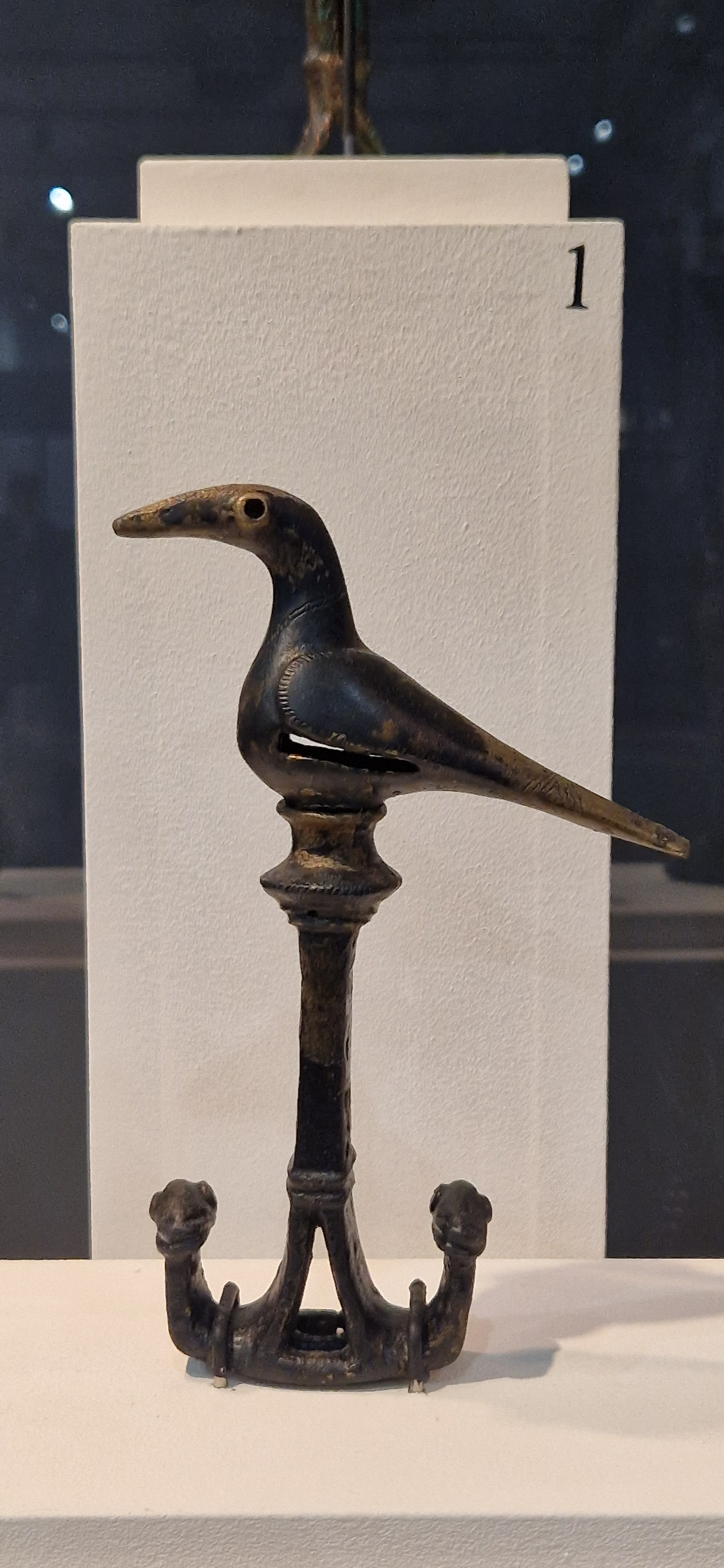
Statuette of a Bird found in Lchashen, Iron Age, 15th–14th century BC.

At the depth of the Shengavit civilization, a new, early burial mound culture was formed, which yet preserved separate pottery traditions. In the middle of the 3rd millennium BC major changes took place in the socio- cultural, as well as political life of Armenia. The Shengavit social-cultural wholeness, that was experiencing a deep economic crisis, finally collapsed. Indo-European tribes settled in the central and northern regions of the Armenian Highland. As a result of the fusion of newcomers and locals, archaeological cultures of early burial mounds, Treghk-Vanadzor, Karmir Berd, Sevan-Artsakh and Karmir Vank were formed. Acting as a group of related cultures, they occupied almost the entire territory of the Armenian Highland-the range of the basins of Urmia, Vana and Sevan lakes and the neighbouring areas, up to the Great Caucasus mountain range. In contrast to the Shengavit civilization, the economy of the Middle Bronze Age was dominated by animal husbandry. This is witnessed not only by the osteological materials, but also by the abundance of burial grounds, which make up 70% of the monuments known to us. The earliest samples of domestic horse sacrifice are attested (Nerkin Naver, 23rd-21st centuries BC). Trophy also played an important role in the economy of the Middle Bronze Age. After successful wars, huge funds were accumulated in the hands of the leader-kings and councils, which became the basis for the flourishing of art and crafts. In the “Palace” workshops, skilled craftsmen prepared exceptional pieces of art. Armenia was involved in the international trade network, the evidence of which is the similarity of luxury items, weapons, and precious metalware with archaeological artifacts found in the center of Southwest Asia. In architectural forms dominant were the constructions with rectangular floorplan (Yerkaruk Blur, Metsamor, Ashtarak fort). Immense burial mounds appeared intended for individual burials, consisting of a stone armour, with cromlech lined around its perimeter and with earthen, rockhewn or stone-covered burial cells with rectangular, sometimes rounded corners, dug in the central part. The deceased were laid in the grave with their limbs bent, men lying on their right, women on their left. Deceased members of the elite were cremated. This ritual, as in the Hittite kingdom, was the monopoly of the council of elders and priests. The diameter of royal tombs reached 50 m, with depth of 7 m and with the area of the tomb halls of 150 square meters. In the Middle Bronze Age, the cremation ritual specific to the elite of Armenia, the huge sizes of tombs, the luxurious as well as gold and silver dishes, imported items, human sacrifices matched with the Hittite and Mesopotamian royal tombs. Such tombs were excavated in Treghk, Martkopi, Alazani Valley, Javahkq, Aruch, Mayisyan, Karashamb, Vanadzor, Nerkin Naver, Gorayk and elsewhere. Exceptional is the Zorats karer (Karahunj) monument near the city of Sisian. The stone path of circular and straight lined menhirs (upright standing stones) stretches for hundreds of meters. Some scientists believe, that it was once an ancient observatory. The cultural heritage of the Middle Bronze Age of Armenia, the exquisite masterpieces of applied art and artistic metalwork (toreutics) are among the brightest pages of the centuries-old creativity of the Armenian people, when the tribal creative spirit bursts with indescribable power, creating masterpieces of art inspired with barbaric grandeur (gold cups covered with precious stones, and doule-layers of Treghk, with heraldically positioned lion sculptures of Vanadzor, silver, episodic decorated cups of Karashamb and Koruktash with ancient sayings of Indo-European mythology depicted son them). There was a great variety of jewels and luxury items: dressers, necklaces, beads, cufflinks, mirrors and others, made of gold, silver, bronze, semi-precious stones (cornelion, jasper, jet stone, onyx, obsidian, amethyst, etc.), multicolor glasses and tinglazed pottery. In the applied art, noteworthy was the multicolor and single-color pottery, the ornamentation of which almost resembled to painting, with its play of colors and expressiveness (Nerkin Naver, Treghq, Getashen, Elar, Aparan, Aruch, etc.). Vessels with black polished, relief zones and dotted decorations are also highly valuable artistic pieces, which together with colorful pottery formed the festive tableware.

== Armenia in the Late Bronze and Early Iron Ages (1500-900 BC) ==
As a result of the evolutionary development of the Middle Bronze Age, the unified culture of the Late Bronze Age was formed in Armenia. It was characterized with the wide spread of cities, fortifications, monumental architecture, with the formation of the class of kings and princes at the highest level of society, of the aristocracy surrounding them and the class of professional warriors, as well as with the appearance of the first samples of the earliest written monuments (Verin Naver, Shamiram, Utik). In the Armenian Highland and also in Kakheti (Georgia), i.e., in the whole area of Middle Bronze Age, that includes colored pottery, a uniform culture of the Late Bronze Age was established-weapons, jewelries, tools and household items were copied with exceptional similarity in monuments placed hundreds of kilometers far. Particularly powerful centers were formed in Aragatsotn (Verin Naver, Metsamor Oshakan, Ujan, Shamiram), in Sevan Lake Basin (Lchashen), in Artsakh (Arajadzor), in Utik (Khanlar), in Gugark (Vanadzor, Lori Berd), in Shirak (Horom, Harich, Artik), in Upper Armenia (Bardzr Hayk) and elsewhere. As a result of the merger of the tribes and tribal unions of the Armenian Highland, in which dominant was the Indo-European ethnic element, the first powerful state formations were created: Etiuni, Hayasa, Mitani, Armenia-Shubria, etc. In this period, ends the first stage of formation of the Armenian civilization. Armenia is one of those regions of the ancient world, where the principles of fortifications originated and were formatted. The principle of building strong fortified wall chains in order to protect the settlements from external danger and to control the approach routes, was launched in Armenia in the Early Bronze Age, was developed in the Middle Bronze Age (Ashtarak Fortress), but was finally formed and widely used in the Late Bronze Age, laying the foundation for the culture of the so-called “Cyclopean” castles or forts, highly typical to the Armenian culture. They had 3-7 rows of surrounding fortified walls and occupied an area of 40-60 hectares, and in some separate cases- more than 100 hectares of area (Motkan Fortress). Almost the entire territory of the Armenian Highland was densely covered with forts (several hundred of forts are known), which were built in places difficult to access: on the high slopes of mountains, on the conical tops of hills, on promontories surrounded on three sides by steep gorges. Among the characteristic features of the forts were the maximum use of the opportunities of its relief, the strengthening of walls and entrances with rectangular masonry, the establishment of seven rows of walls on the road leading to the fort. The preserved height of the walls reaches to 7 m (Tghit), the thickness is 3–6 m (Motkan fort, Tsitsernakaberd, etc.). Temple complexes were excavated in Dvin, Metsamor and Gegharot. In the sanctuaries of Dvin, terracotta rectangular board-altars, decorated with animals and geometric relief figures, were discovered, in front of which unquenchable fire was lit. The human-shaped sculptures of various sizes in the adoration position uncovered in Metsamor Cathedral, symbolized the trinity of father, mother and son. The tombs of the elite had stone-earthen tombs up to 50 m in diameter and 2 m in height, in the central part of which were half ground-dug tomb halls, with a rectangular floorplan, built of tufa and basalt giant stones with flattened fronts. They had both straight lined walls and log-slab comlex roofs (Lchashen, Verin Naver, Zorats Karer), as well as walls gradually narrowing upwards and structures covered with one-piece slabs (Verin Naver, Shamiram). The walls of the tombhalls were covered with carpets, rugs and expensive animal furs. Specially brought river stones were used to form the cromlechs, from which started the tomb entrances, that sloped down to the tomb hall (dramos). The sizes of the tombs, the richness and multi-functionality of the funerary offerings (weapons, tools, symbols of power), ritual objects, jewelries, household and cult objects, chariots, carts and catafalques, human, bird, domestic and wild animal, including lion (Verin Naver) large number sacrifices testify the burials of kings and supreme priests at this sites. In the royal tomb (16th-15th centuries BC), excavated in Verin Naver, in 2012, were found items imported from Babylon (glazed clay beads), Persian Gulf (sea snails from the Persian Gulf), China (jade), medallions (bitum) with engraved portraits of leader-kings covered with gold plate and cufflinks with images of argali and trees of life. These items have strong resemblance to the samples of Middle Elamite art. Unique is the round bronze sculpture belonging to the middle of the II millennium BC. The realism, that was characteristic of the ancient art of Armenia of this era reached to an admirable expressiveness. Metal-plastic samples were made of melted bronze with high fluidity, in wax molds, which implied that each of them was unique and unrepeatable. Bronze sculpture is characterized with a highly specific thematic repertoire. It represents anthropomorphic deities, mythological heroes, worshiped animals (bull, goat, deer) and birds (golden eagle, dove, etc.). These statues were attached to crosiers, coats of arms (shtandart) and chariots. Noteworthy are the group of sculptures with mythological plots, the compositions of which are characterized with rhythmic balance. Notable are the scale models of two-wheeled chariots, in which the position of the torsos of the warriors give us the sense of the galloping style of the chariots. The sculpture of a bearded soldier is unique in the metalwork of Lori Fortress. The sculpture of this hero with swastikas (Armenian eternity sign) on his thighs, broad-shoulder, narrow- back and powerful thighs seemed to foreshow the foundations of masculine beauty, that later became canonical in Greek art. The sculpture of a hero in Shirakavan, with chained fearsome wild beast (lion) depicts the characters of the hero and the beast endowed with tremendous strength. Most likely, it is the prototype of the lion-shaped Mher - one of the favorite heroes of the Armenian epic poetry. In the Early Iron Age, metalwork was of smaller size. There were found miniatures of battle idols, figurines of women and men, as well as of dogs, goats, horses, deer and birds, which characterize the peculiarities of the heroes: strength, elegance, fierce nature, athletic figure, etc. (Paravakar, Ayrum, Artsvakar). A special field of art is the iconography of bronze belts. Among the hundreds of belts found in Armenia, the examples of Lchashen, Stepanavan and Astgh hill are the most noticeable ones. Broad bronze plates depict (with carvings) sacred conception, mythological and domestic, battle and hunting scenes. The central plot is surrounded by two-three rows of edgeband with fir-shape or “running” gyre decorations. Carved figures have solemn- static or pronounced plastic mobility. Along with realistic figures, there are also numerous figures of people and animals of fantastic shape. Depictions of deer, goat, bird, celestial luminary, lion-faced men and horned horses (unicorns) were particularly widespread. The chariot battle scenes give an idea of the structure of the Armenian armed forces of that period, which consisted of heavily weaponed infantry, armed with long spears and rectangular, large shields, of light cavalry, vanguard and rearguard regiments. The personal seals of the kings and rulers of Mesopotamia found in the tombs of the elite (Metsamor) testify, that the Armenian armies fought successful battles in the territory of the most powerful states, bringing rich booty from there.

== Armenia in the Achaemenid and Hellenistic periods ==
At the beginning of the 6th century BC, in the Middle East, the kingdoms of new Assyria, Babylon, Egypt and Van were destroyed. The vast polity called Urartu or Armina, (mentioned in the Behistun trilingual inscription of Darius the Great) which stretched from Anti-Taurus mountains to the Caspian Sea, from Mesopotamia to the banks of the Kur River, belonged to the Armenian Yervandean (Orontid) dynasty. Armenia is mentioned in the works of the 6th century Greek historian Hecataeus of Miletus, Herodotus, Xenophon, Polybius, Strabo and of others. Armenia became the full political and cultural heir of the Kingdom of Van. After 5 bloody battles, Armenia got under the control of Achaemenid Persian Empire. Darius the Great formed the 13th and 18th satrapies in Armenia. The Royal road built by Darius the Great passed through Armenia and connected Persia with the Mediterranean. The Yervandean (Orontid) kings had an important role in Achaemenid Persia and had a semi-independent status. In Yervandean Armenia, several spheres flourish, among them the artistic metalwork, the best examples of which were found near the Erebuni fortress, in Armavir, Van, Yerznka and elsewhere, as well as the glyptic (hardstone carving) and the so-called apadana architecture (Erebuni). In the decisive Battle of Gaugamela (331) by Alexander the Great's eastern campaign, the Armenian troops fighting on the right wing of Darius III army, severely pressured the Macedonians. After the collapse of the Achaemenid Empire and the establishment of the Seleucid Empire, Armenia was gradually included in the Hellenistic civilization. Armenia was independent during the time of Alexander and his Diadochi. In 201, another Yervandean dynasty member, Artashes I (201-163 BC), took the throne from Yervand, the king of the Greater Armenia. In 189 BC, Artashes declared Armenia as an independent country and reunited the borders of Yervandean Armenia, bringing back the lost provinces. In Strabo's Geography it is testified, that at that time everyone in Armenia spoke Armenian. Aramaic was also used by the elite, in which the boundary stones of Artashes I are recorded. During the reign of the Artaxiad dynasty, urban development flourished in Armenia. Along with the ancient cities of Van, Armavir, Erebuni, the Armenian kings founded dozens of other cities, which they named after themselves: Samosat, Arsamea, Arshamashat, Yervandashat, Tigranakert and Artashat. The latter, according to Plutarch's testimony, was built by the advice of the Carthage military commander Hannibal. These were some of the populous and prosperous cities on the Silk Road, an international trade route that stretched from China and India to the Mediterranean, attested by a number of Greco-Roman historians. Local, eastern and western cultures were reflected in them, as attested by the results of the excavations. Various crafts flourished. Armenia imported goods and exported agricultural and handicraft products, minerals, as attested by the Roman historian Pliny the Elder. The masters of Armenia were especially skilled in artistic metalwork. This is evidenced by the highly artistic jewelry found in Van, Armavir, Artashat, and Lori fortress: bracelets ending with animal heads, brooches, precious metal dishes. In particular, noteworthy are the shaped handles of vessels and silver drinking vessel. The largest of the states of Hellenistic Armenia was Mets Hayk (Kingdom of Armenia), which reached the peak of its power under the ruler of the East, king of kings Tigran the Great (95- 56 AD). He defeated the Parthians and removed the armies of the Roman Empire from the banks of the Euphrates, as well as regulated transit trade between East and West. One of its capitals, Tigranakert, was built according to a pre-planned project - in the upper basin of Tigris. Powerful fortresses were built, particularly Garni, mentioned by the Roman historian Tacitus. Hellenistic Armenia was included in the political, economic and cultural processes of the Old World. For the purpose of meeting the requirements of monetary circulation, Armenia created it own drams. The Armenian culture was a synthesis of Hellenistic and Ancient Eastern cultures, with a very traditional content. It became one of the sources of culture in the Christian East. The Artashesid dynasty was replaced in Armenia by the Arshakunis (66 AD). Significant changes in cultural and political life were observed from this period on. Armenian cities, particularly Artashat, became key centers of international trade. The water supply of urban settlements was improved. Armenia's trade and economic ties extended to Western Europe, Central Asia, the Crimean Peninsula and Egypt. In the field of pottery, the growth of qualitative features became noticeable. Glassmaking and the art of terracotta figurines became widely popular. The walls of temples, palaces and rich houses were decorated with multi-colored plaster, murals, gypsum cornice, roofs were covered with tiles. From the middle of the 3rd century, both Sasanian Persian Empire and Roman influences became noticeable in Armenia (Garni Temple, the Mosaic of Garni Temple), but Hellenistic traditions prevailed. Their influence was particularly evident in the art of Agtsk terracotta basreliefs, which featured naturalistic sculptures of lions chasing the deer, tigers chasing the rams, camel eating thistle, simurgh bird- a mythical bird with eagle legs and peacock's head and tail standing in front of the tree of life. In 301, after adopting Christianity as the state religion, under the influence of a new ideology, a new culture is formed in Armenia.

== See also ==
- Archaeology of Armenia
- History of Armenia
- Prehistoric Armenia
