= Godedzor =

Archaeological site in Armenia

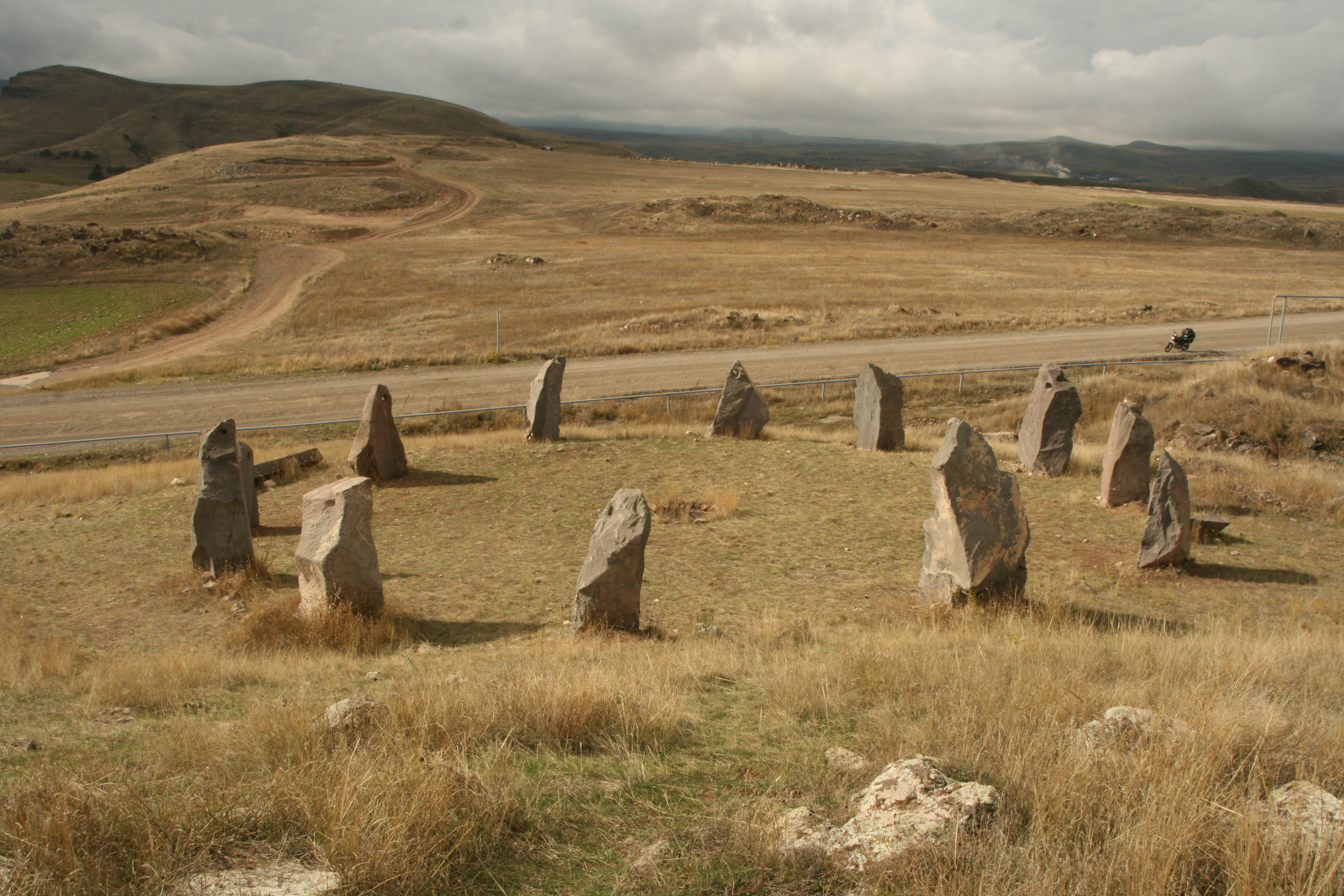
- Megalithic rings near Godedzor

- Location in Syunik, Armenia
- 39.5779°N 45.9179°E
- Location: Syunik, Armenia

History
- Built: c. 4000 BC
- Abandoned: c. 3500 BC

Godedzor is a prehistorical archaeological site located about 1.5 kilometres west of the village of Angeghakot in the Syunik Province of Armenia. The settlement of Nerkin Godedzor is in the Vorotan river gorge, at the altitude of 1,800 meters. Some petroglyphs are also found close by.

This was a seasonal occupation site used by pastoralists, as this area is covered by snow during the winter. There are some indications that the occupation here started already in the last quarter of the 5th millennium BC but, according to radiocarbon dates, the main activities took place during the time frame between 3650 and 3350 cal. BC.

Around 15 km east of Godedzor, near Sisian, is located a prehistoric archaeological site of Carahunge known as the 'Armenian Stonehenge'. It was discovered in 1994, and the age of these megalithic monuments may go back to the Bronze Age or earlier.

== Discovery ==
In 2003, an archaeological survey revealed prehistoric cultural deposits distinguished by a distinctive stone industry and ceramics. The site is on the left bank of a river. Parts of the site had unfortunately been destroyed by recent agricultural activity. Excavation started here in 2005.

== Obsidian ==
Plenty of obsidian artifacts were found at Godedzor. The location of this site is favourable for access to important Syunik obsidian deposits further upstream the Vorotan river.

Syunik obsidian (especially from Sevkar) has been identified in many artefacts from the Near East (also known as "group 3c"). Especially they have been found in the Lake Urmia basin in Iran. Godedzor was a big hub of obsidian trade in the South Caucasus.

"The artefacts in this [Syunik] group come mainly from north-western Iran and were found in 6th millennium BC contexts (Hajji Firuz, Yanik Tepe) or the 5th‑4th millennia BC (Dava Göz, Kushali Tepe, Kul Tepe (Hadishahr), Ghosha, Yanik Tepe, Kohne Tepesi)."

== Pottery ==
There is a clear Near Eastern affinity in Godedzor cultural traits. The pottery shows some links with Ubaid culture, although they are not comprehensive. There are indications of some local developments in this area at the periphery of the Ubaid and Syro-Mesopotamian cultural sphere.

At Godedzor, all the Chalcolithic pottery is handmade, and the most common type of pottery is Chaff-tempered Ware.

== Agriculture ==
Farming also played a role in the subsistence strategies of Godedzor. Abundant botanical evidence was found here by archaeologists. Cereal crops were predominant. Around 60% of the crops were wheat, and around 40% barley. It appears that some crops were planted before the winter came in and, when the tribes returned in the spring with their flocks, these crops were already ready to be harvested.

The keeping of five domestic animals have been attested at Godedzor, including cattle, sheep, goat, pig and dog. 15 wild animal species have also been hunted. Goats were the most common species, and cattle were the second in importance.

Godedzor shows some structural and economic continuity between the economies of the Late Chalcolithic period, to which it belongs, and the Kura–Araxes cultures that developed later in the same highland areas. Among these signs of continuity was the cereal-focused agriculture that was first introduced in the mountainous areas already by the Chalcolithic peoples.

== See also ==
- Archaeological heritage of Armenia

== Bibliography ==
- Catherine Marro and Thomas Stöllner, eds. Marro, Catherine; Stöllner, Thomas, eds. (2021). On salt, copper and gold: The origins of early mining and metallurgy in the Caucasus. MOM Éditions. doi:10.4000/books.momeditions.12257. ISBN 978-2-35668-074-7.
