= Angeghakot =

Community in Syunik, Armenia

Angeghakot Անգեղակոթ
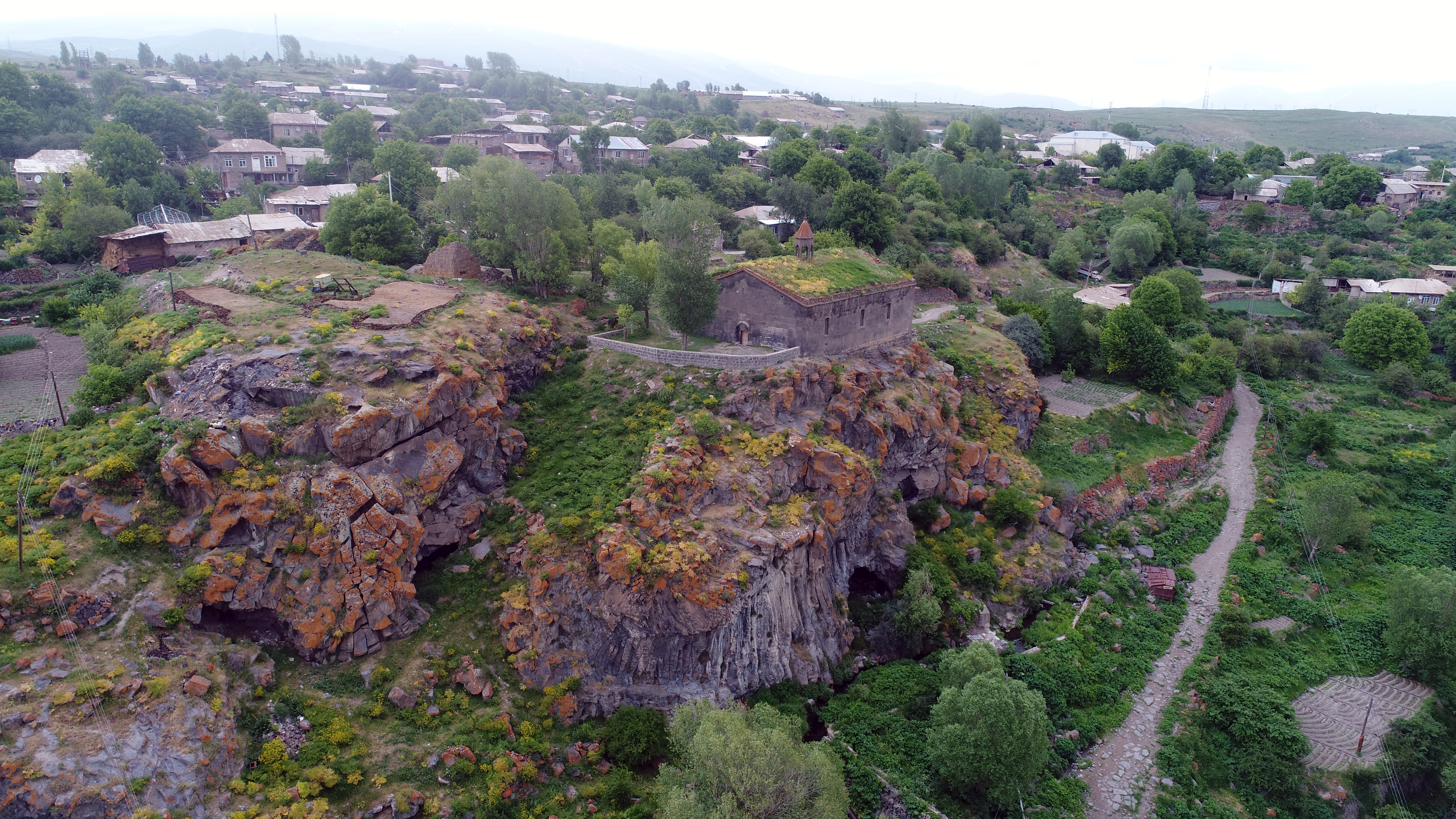

- Location within Armenia Location within Syunik Province
- Coordinates: 39°34′05″N 45°56′38″E
- Country: Armenia
- Province: Syunik
- Municipality: Sisian

Area
  - Total: 45.79 km^{2} (17.68 sq mi)

Population (2011)
  - Total: 1,582
  - Density: 34.55/km^{2} (89.48/sq mi)
- Time zone: UTC+4 (AMT)

Angeghakot (Armenian: Անգեղակոթ) is a village in the Sisian Municipality of the Syunik Province in Armenia.

== Geography ==
A large reservoir, the Angeghakot Reservoir, spanning more than the entire length of the village lies to the south.

== Historical heritage sites ==
About 1,5 kilometres west of Angeghakot is located an important prehistorical archaeological site of Godedzor. The settlement of Nerkin Godedzor is in the Vorotan river gorge, at the altitude of 1800 meters. Some petroglyphs are also found close by.

In 2003, an archaeological survey revealed prehistoric cultural deposits distinguished by a distinctive stone industry and ceramics. The site is on the left bank of a river. Plenty of obsidian artifacts were found at Godedzor. The Syunik obsidian (especially from Sevkar) has been identified in many artefacts from the Near East. Especially they have been found in the Lake Urmia basin in Iran. Godedzor was a big hub of obsidian trade in the South Caucasus.

== Demographics ==
In 1908, Angeghakot, then known as Angelaut (Russian: Ангелаут), had a predominantly Armenian population of 1,520 within the Zangezur uezd of the Elizavetpol Governorate of the Russian Empire. The Statistical Committee of Armenia reported its population as 2,057 in 2010, up from 1,860 at the 2001 census.

== Gallery ==
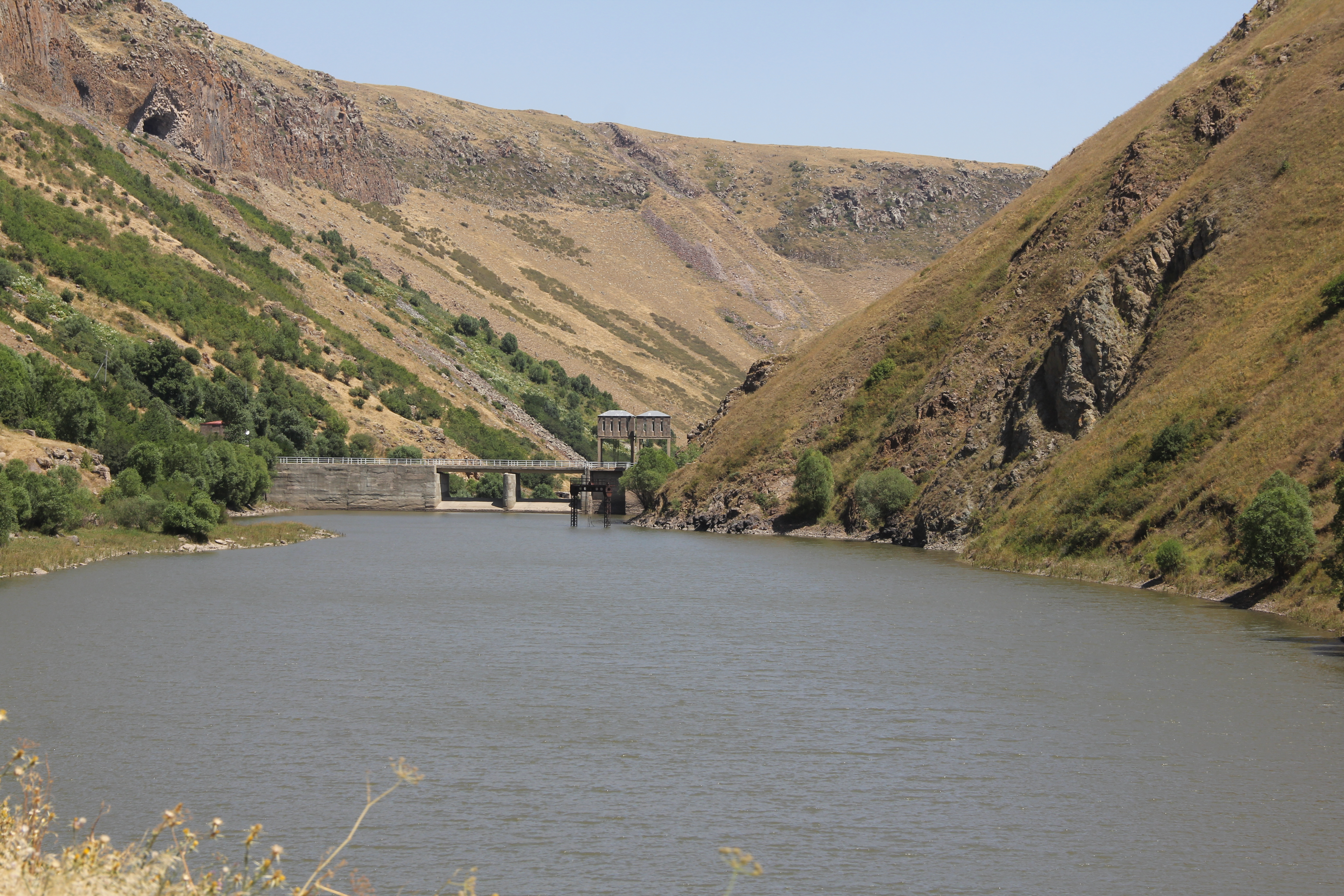
Angeghakot Reservoir

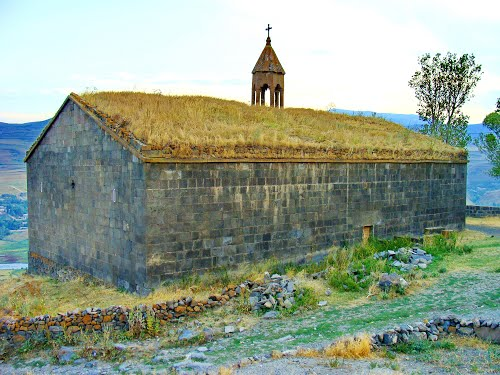
Hazaraprkich Church

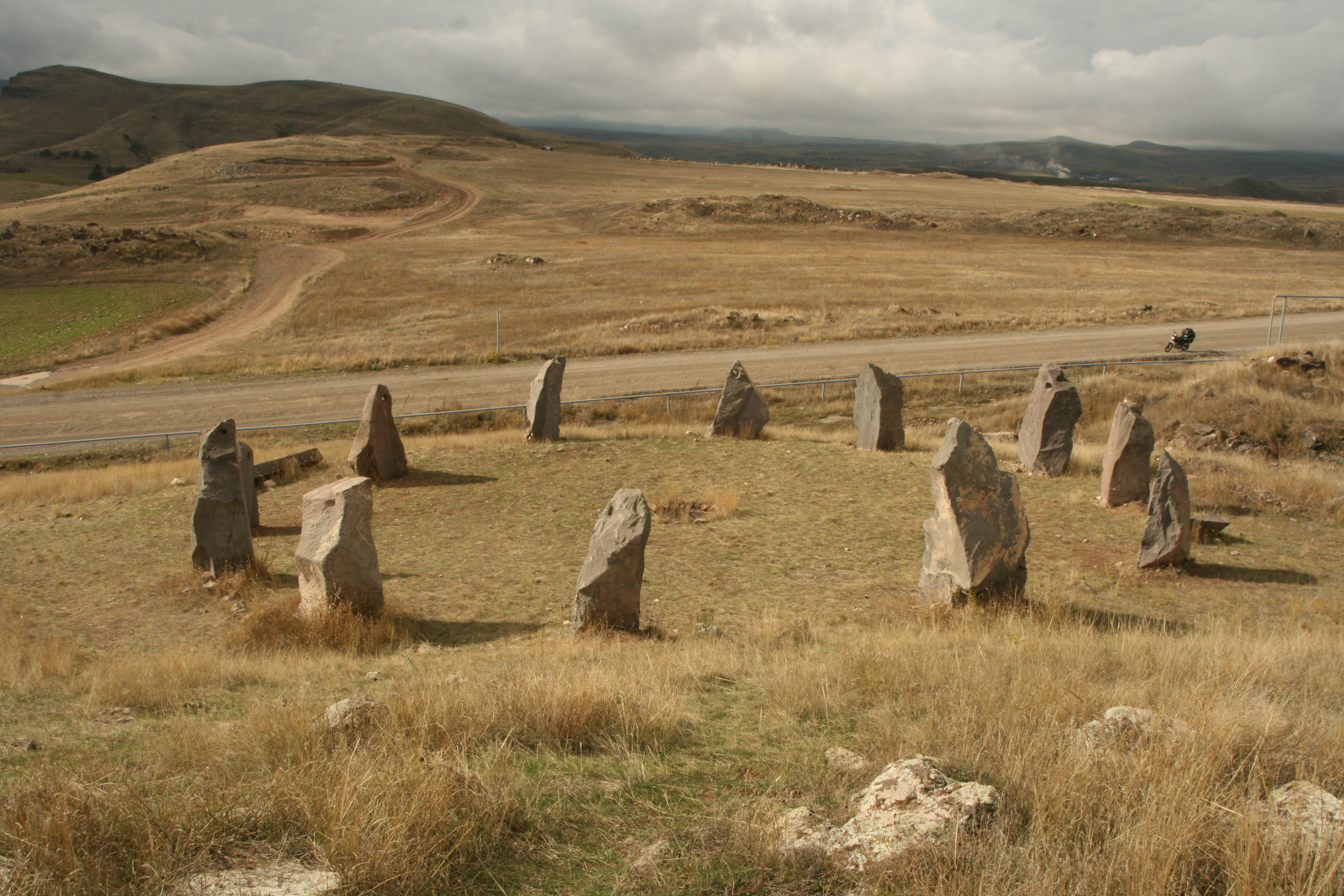
Megalithic rings in Angeghakot

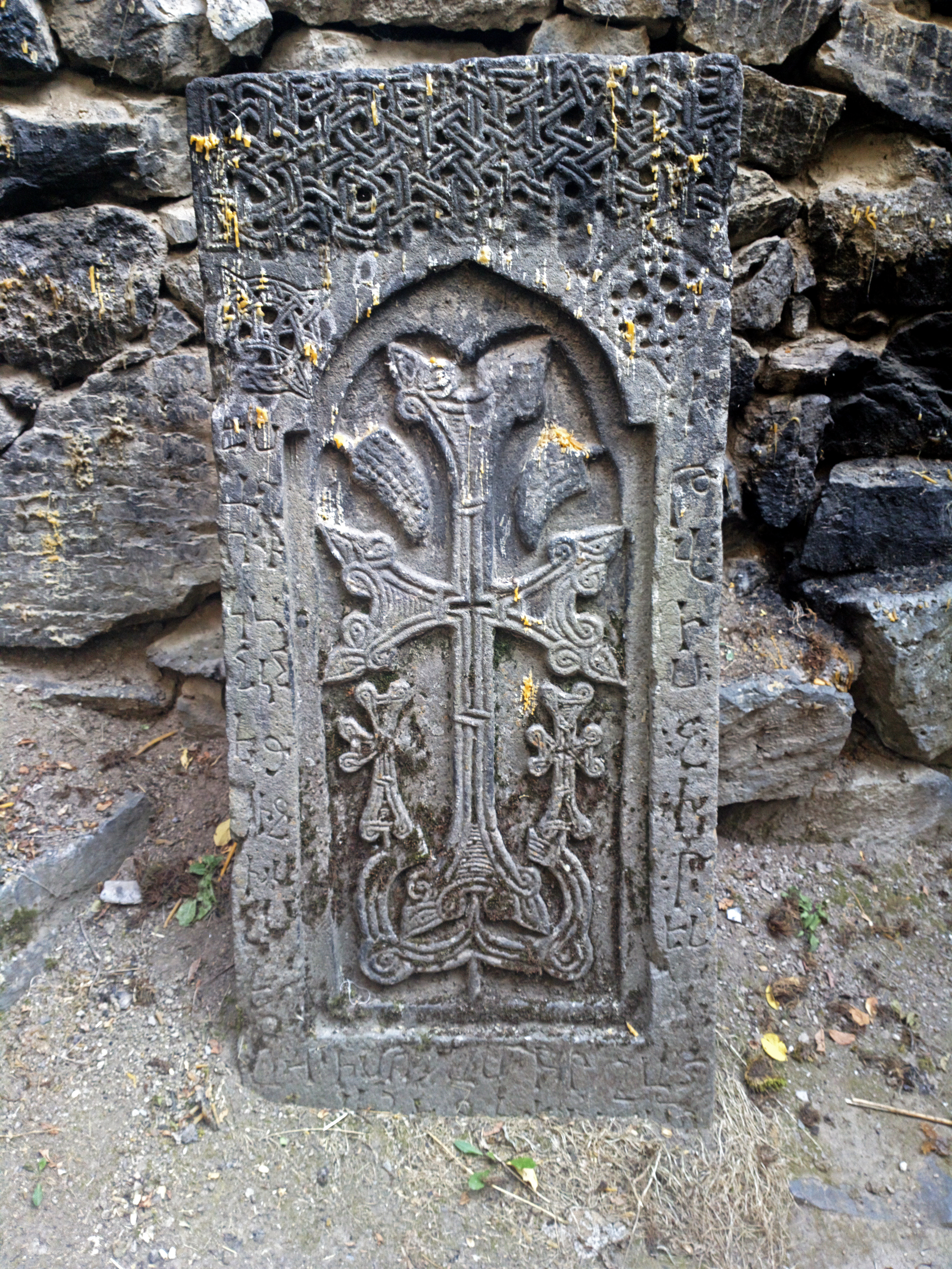
Khachkar

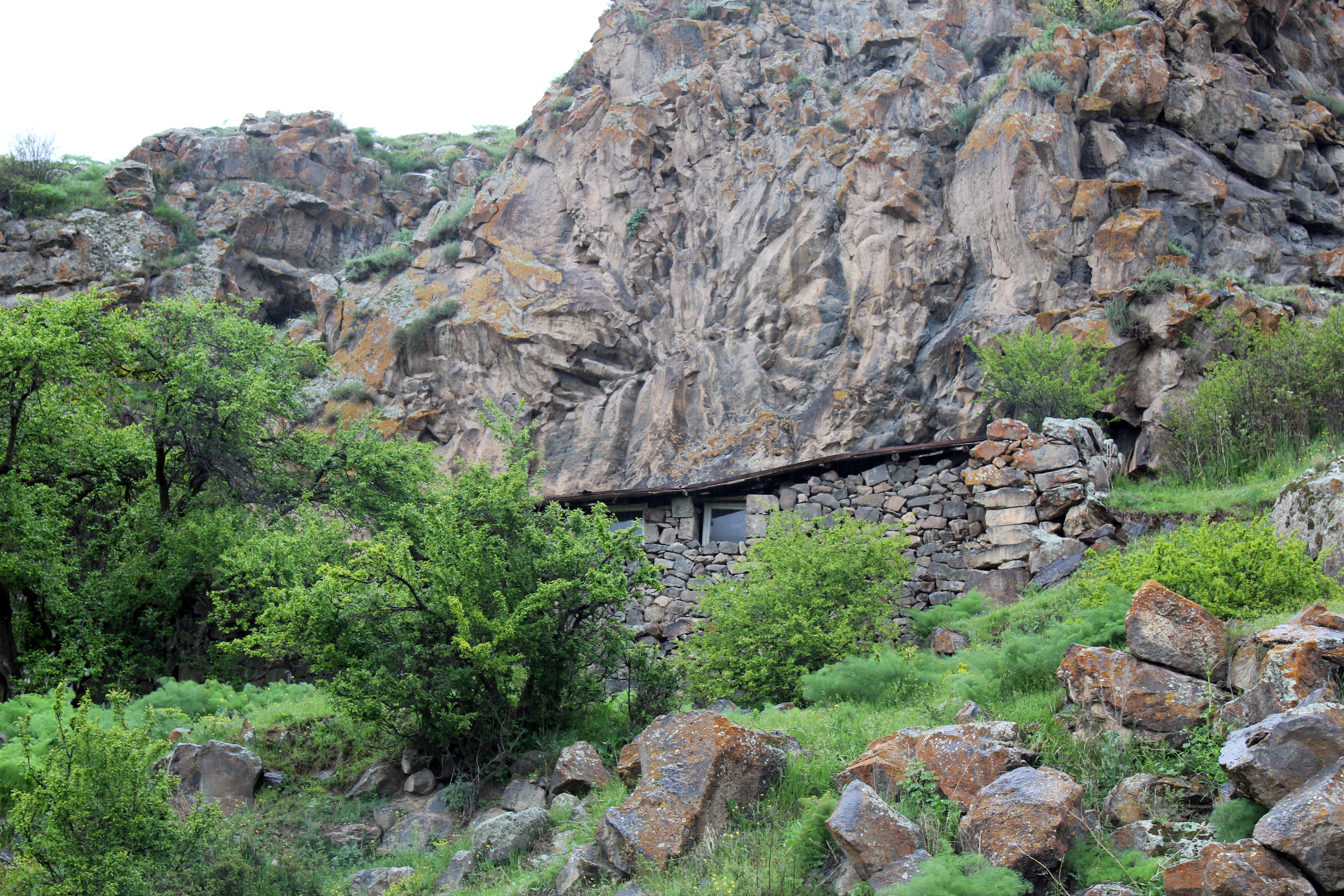
Saint Vardan chapel

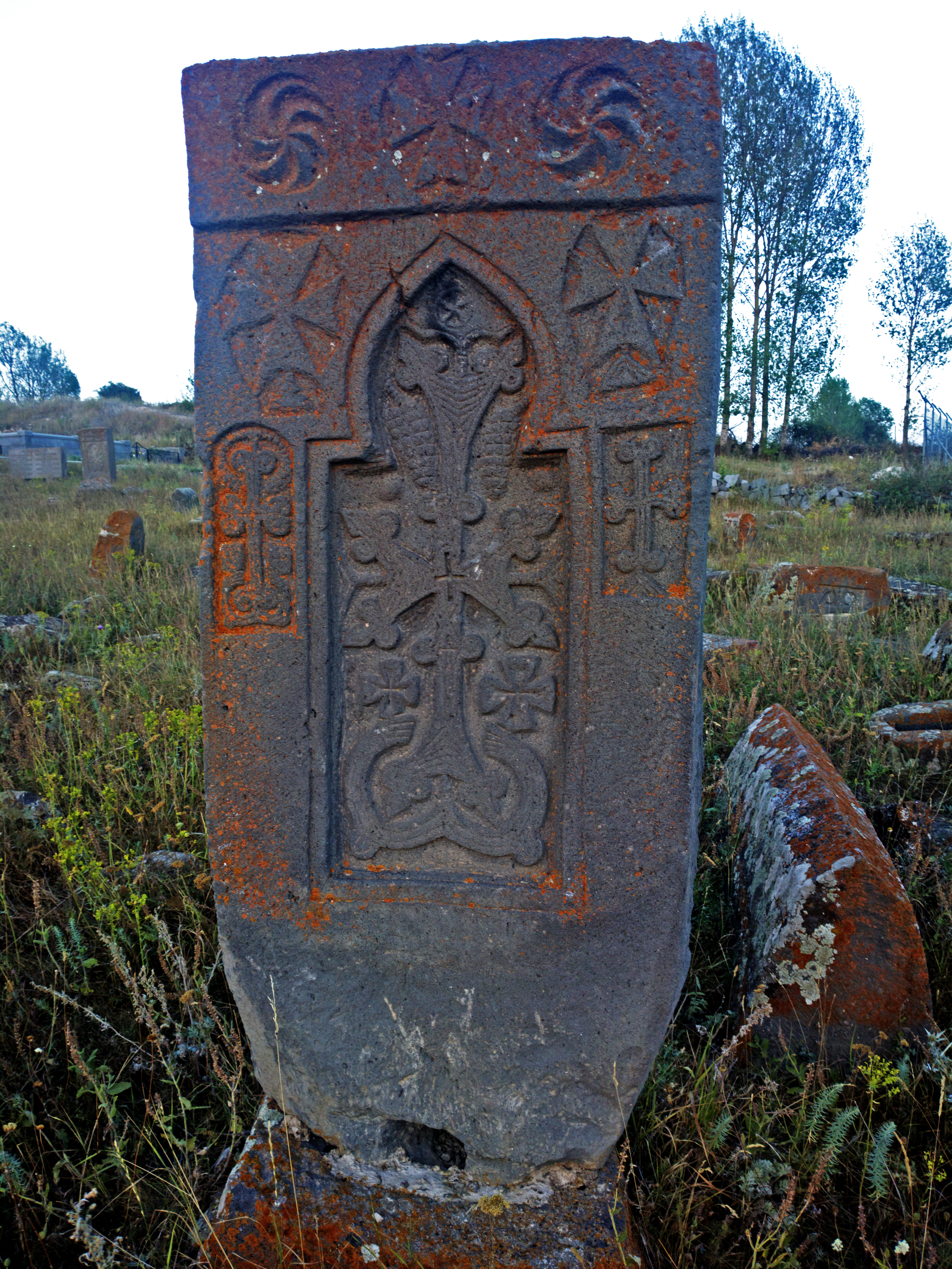
Khachkar

== Notable people ==
- Oksen Mirzoyan, Olympic, world and European champion in weightlifting
