= Artsvakar =

Neighborhood in Gavar, Armenia

- Location within Armenia Location within Gegharkunik
- Coordinates: 40°21′19″N 45°10′21″E
- Country: Armenia
- Marz (Province): Gegharkunik
- Time zone: UTC+4 ( )

Artsvakar (formerly, Ghshlakh), is former village and currently a neighbourhood within the town of Gavar, the capital of Gegharkunik Province of Armenia. It is home to an Iron Age fortress, dating back to the 2nd millennium BC.

== See also ==
- Gegharkunik Province
