= Gorayk Municipality =

Gorayk Գորայք
- Rural Community
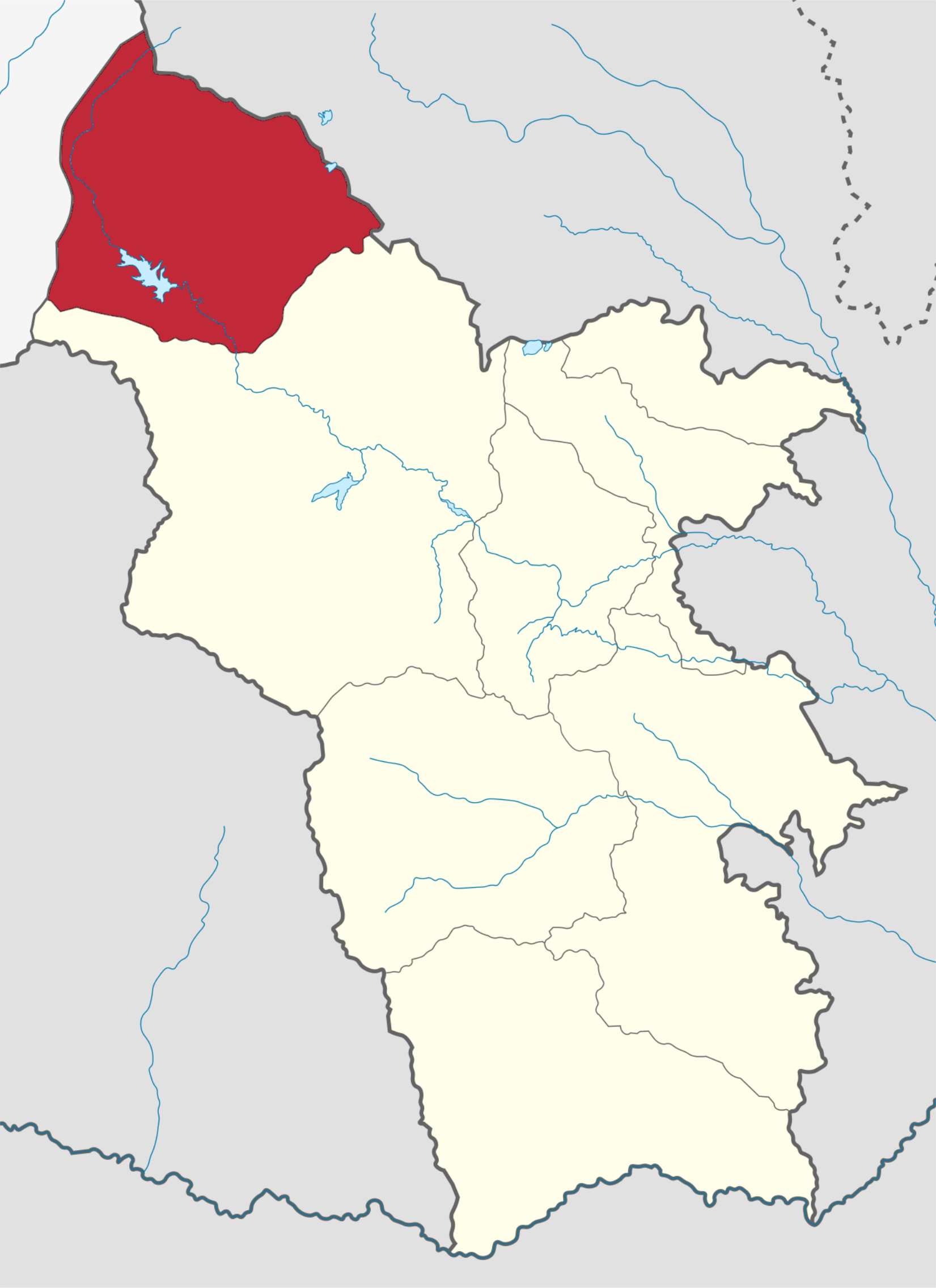
- Coordinates: 39°40′N 45°47′E
- Country: Armenia
- Province: Syunik
- Formed: 2016-2022
- Administrative centre: Gorayk

Government
  - Mayor: Arustam Arustamyan

Population (2011 census)
  - Total: 1,702
- Time zone: AMT (UTC+04)
- Postal code: 3201–3519
- ISO 3166 code: AM-SU
- FIPS 10-4: AM08

Gorayk Municipality, referred to as Gorayk Community (Armenian: Գորայք Համայնք Gorayk Hamaynk), was a rural community and administrative subdivision of Syunik Province of Armenia, at the south of the country. Consisted of a group of settlements, its administrative centre is the village of Gorayk. Since 2022 it has been incorporated into Sisian Municipality.

== Included settlements ==
Settlement	Type	Population (2011 census)
Gorayk	Village, administrative centre	435
Sarnakunk	Village	474
Spandaryan	Village	371
Tsghuk	Village	422

== See also ==
- Syunik Province
