= Darbas =

Darbas Դարբաս
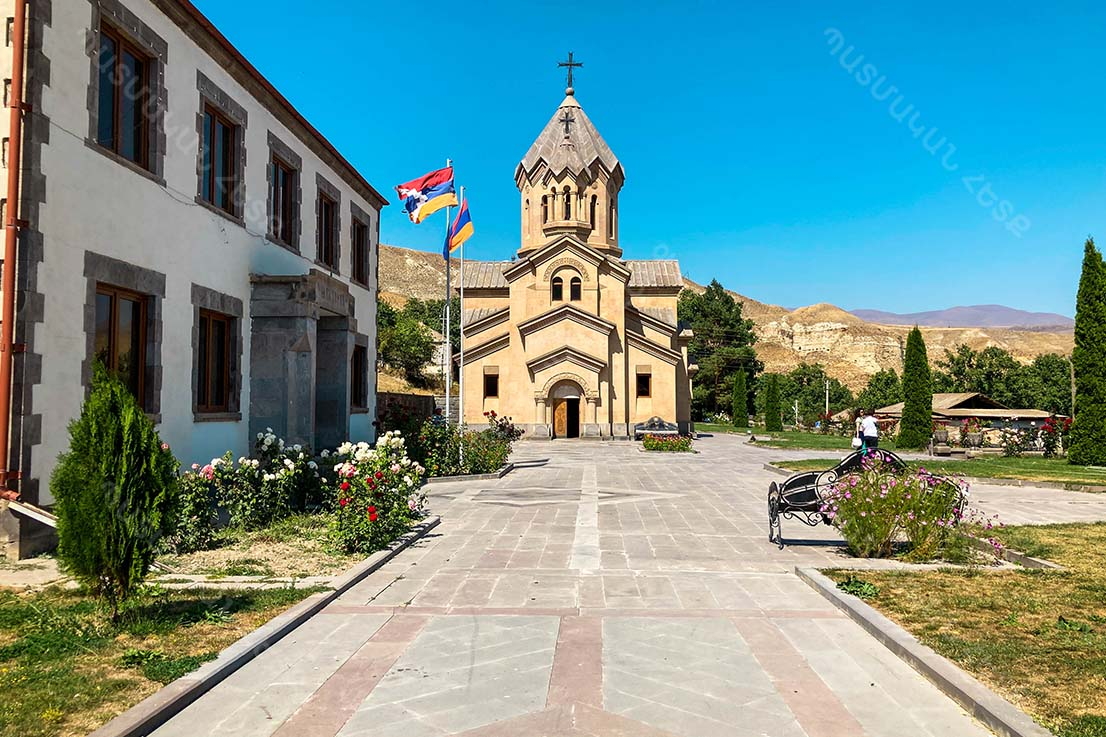
- Saint Stephen's church in Darbas

- Location within Armenia Location within Syunik Province
- Coordinates: 39°26′24″N 46°07′20″E
- Country: Armenia
- Province: Syunik
- Municipality: Sisian

Area
  - Total: 28.09 km^{2} (10.85 sq mi)

Population (2011)
  - Total: 556
  - Density: 19.8/km^{2} (51.3/sq mi)
- Time zone: UTC+4 (AMT)

Darbas (Armenian: Դարբաս) is a village in the Sisian Municipality of the Syunik Province in Armenia.

== Economy and culture ==
The school and health clinic in Darbas are the largest and most resourced in the Darbas valley. There are primary schools and basic health clinics in both Darbas and the nearby village of Shamb. Saint Stephen's Church opened in the village in 2010.

== Municipal administration ==
The village was the center of the Darbas community, which contained the villages of Darbas, the nearby village of Shamb until the June 2017 administrative and territorial reforms, when the village became a part of the Sisian Municipality. The distance between Darbas and Shamb is approximately 8 kilometers by road.

== Demographics ==
ARMSTAT reported the village's population as 556 at the 2011 census, In the 2001 census, Darbas had a population of 698.

== Gallery ==
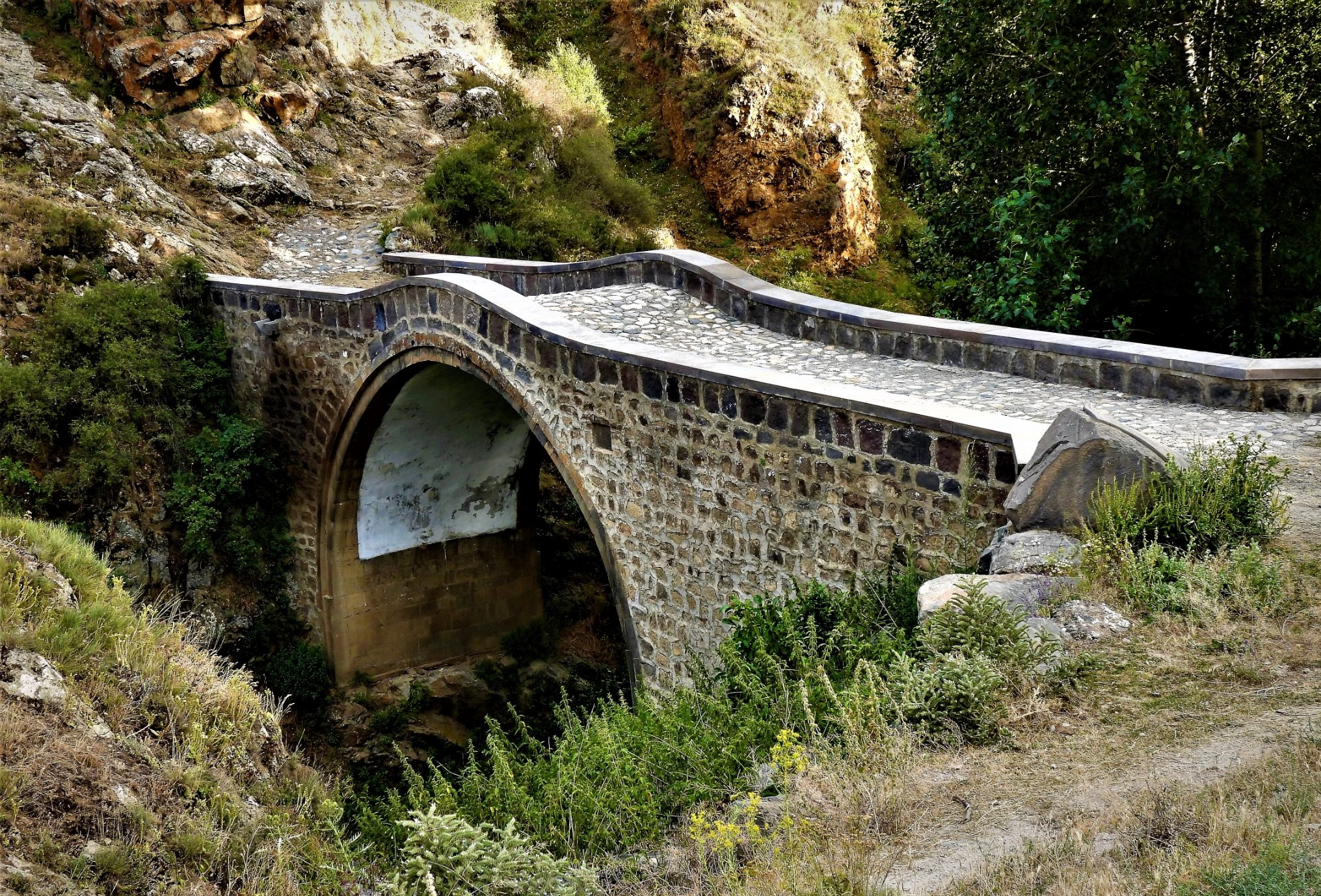

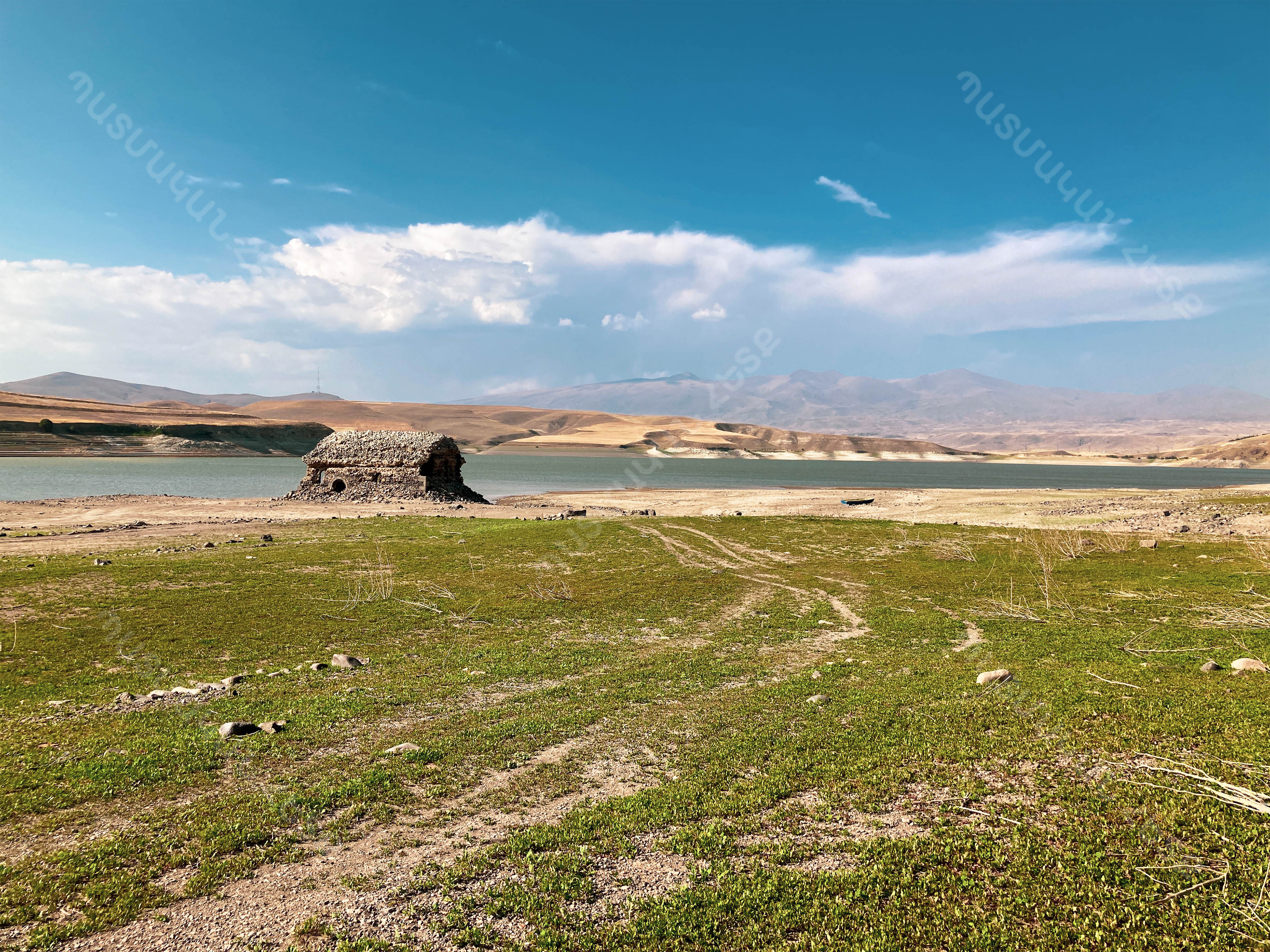
