= Nzhdeh, Armenia =

Nzhdeh Նժդեհ
- Location within Armenia Location within Syunik Province
- Coordinates: 39°22′31″N 45°59′46″E
- Country: Armenia
- Province: Syunik
- Municipality: Sisian

Area
  - Total: 28.81 km^{2} (11.12 sq mi)

Population (2011)
  - Total: 139
  - Density: 4.82/km^{2} (12.5/sq mi)
- Time zone: UTC+4 (AMT)

Nzhdeh (Armenian: Նժդեհ) is a village in the Sisian Municipality of the Syunik Province in Armenia.

== Demographics ==
The Statistical Committee of Armenia reported the community's population as 188 in 2010, up from 185 at the 2001 census. The village's population was 92 at the 2011 census, down from 114 at the 2001 census.

== Municipal administration ==
The village was previously the center of a municipal community, which included the village of Tsghuni.
