= Lizin =

Lizin may refer to:

- Anne-Marie Lizin (1949–2015), Belgian politician
- Ltsen, Armenia
