= Bnunis =

Bnunis Բնունիս
- Location within Armenia Location within Syunik Province
- Coordinates: 39°26′40″N 46°00′21″E
- Country: Armenia
- Province: Syunik
- Municipality: Sisian

Area
  - Total: 17.16 km^{2} (6.63 sq mi)

Population (2011)
  - Total: 176
  - Density: 10.3/km^{2} (26.6/sq mi)
- Time zone: UTC+4 (AMT)

Bnunis (Armenian: Բնունիս) is a village in the Sisian Municipality of the Syunik Province in Armenia.

== Toponymy ==
The village was previously known as Bnunik.

== Demographics ==
The Statistical Committee of Armenia reported its population as 188 in 2010, up from 163 at the 2001 census.
