= Hatsavan, Syunik =

Hatsavan Հացավան
- Location within Armenia Location within Syunik Province
- Coordinates: 39°27′46″N 45°58′23″E
- Country: Armenia
- Province: Syunik
- Municipality: Sisian

Area
  - Total: 8.03 km^{2} (3.10 sq mi)

Population (2011)
  - Total: 253
  - Density: 31.5/km^{2} (81.6/sq mi)
- Time zone: UTC+4 (AMT)

Hatsavan (Armenian: Հացավան) is a village in the Sisian Municipality of the Syunik Province in Armenia.

== Toponymy ==
The village was previously known as Sisian.

== Demographics ==
The Statistical Committee of Armenia reported its population was 280 in 2010, up from 262 at the 2001 census.

== Notable people ==
- Ashot Avagyan (1958-), Armenian painter
