= Getatagh =

Getatagh Գետաթաղ
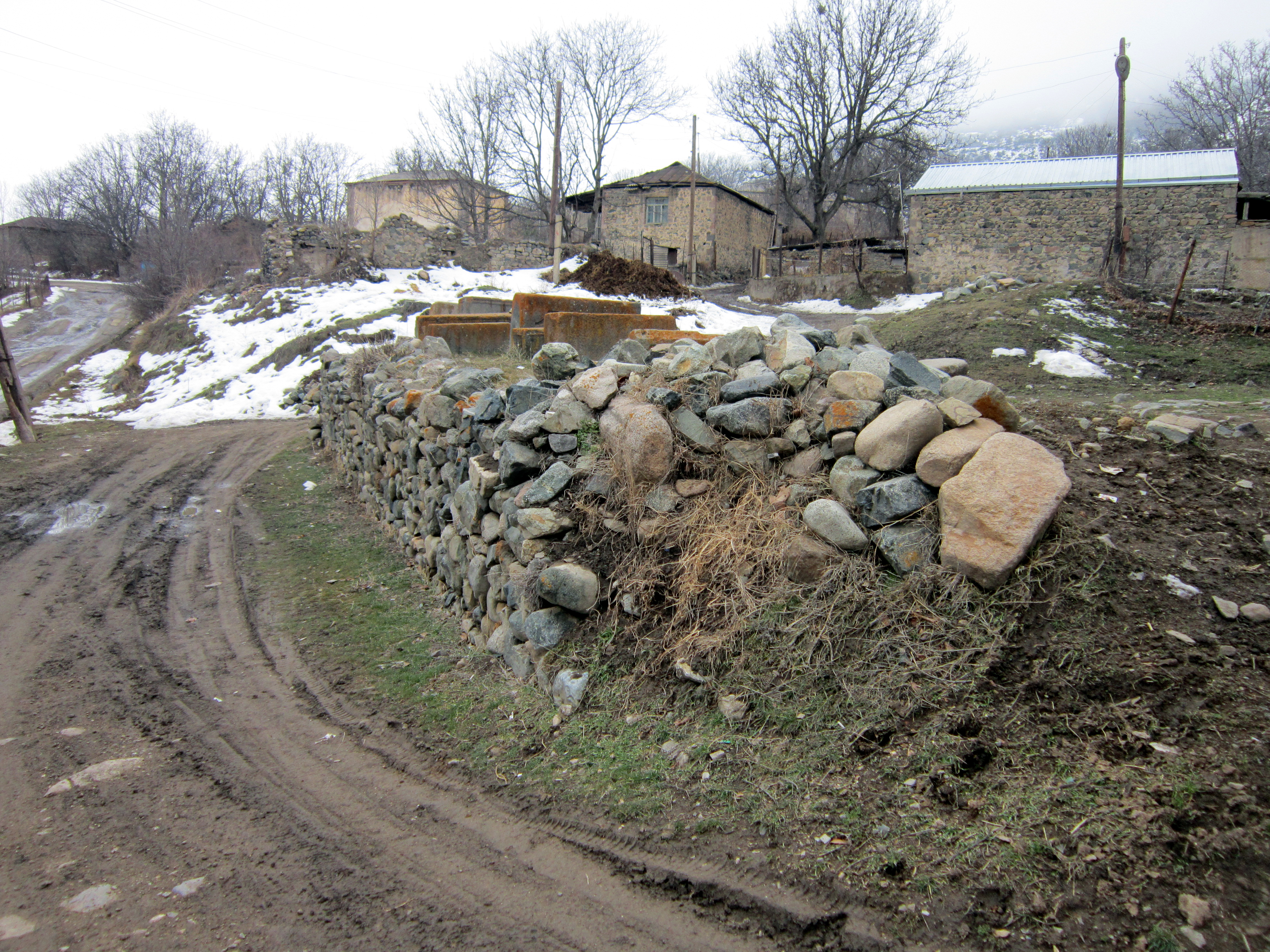

- Location within Armenia Location within Syunik Province
- Coordinates: 39°25′29″N 46°07′17″E
- Country: Armenia
- Province: Syunik
- Municipality: Sisian

Area
  - Total: 21.76 km^{2} (8.40 sq mi)

Population (2011)
  - Total: 182
  - Density: 8.36/km^{2} (21.7/sq mi)
- Time zone: UTC+4 (AMT)

Getatagh (Armenian: Գետաթաղ) is a village in the Sisian Municipality of the Syunik Province in Armenia.

== Historical heritage sites ==
The St. Astvatsatsin Church in the village was built in 1702.

== Demographics ==
The Statistical Committee of Armenia reported its population as 220 in 2010, up from 194 at the 2001 census.

== Gallery ==
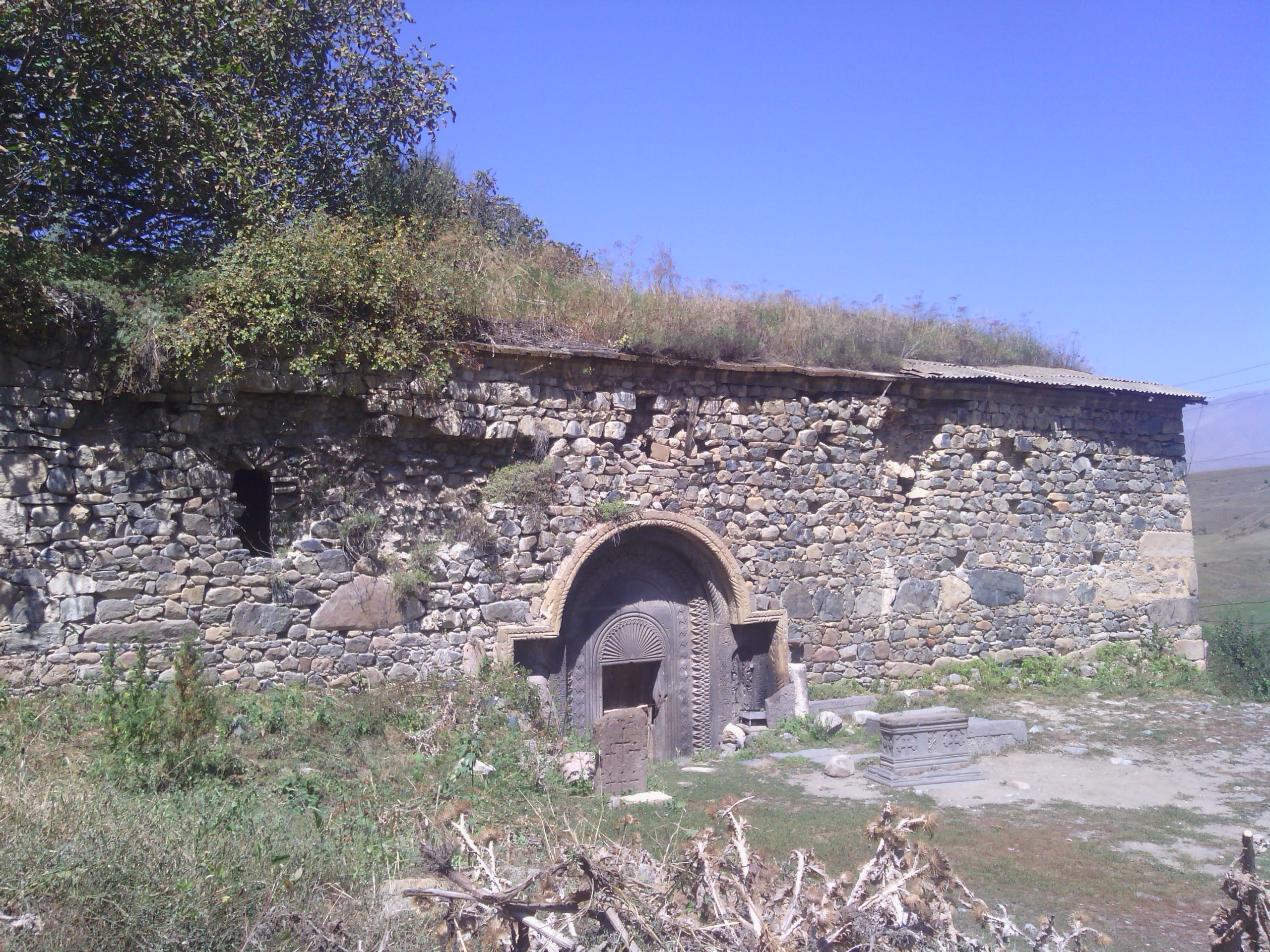
Saint Astvatsatsin Church in Getatagh
