= Shenatagh =

Shenatagh Շենաթաղ
- Location within Armenia Location within Syunik Province
- Coordinates: 39°22′48″N 46°07′56″E
- Country: Armenia
- Province: Syunik
- Municipality: Sisian

Area
  - Total: 43.84 km^{2} (16.93 sq mi)

Population (2011)
  - Total: 389
  - Density: 8.87/km^{2} (23.0/sq mi)
- Time zone: UTC+4 (AMT)

Shenatagh (Armenian: Շենաթաղ) is a village in the Sisian Municipality of the Syunik Province in Armenia.

== Toponymy ==
The village was previously known as Shinagat and Lernashen.

== Demographics ==
The Statistical Committee of Armenia reported its population was 422 in 2010, up from 390 at the 2001 census.
