= Balak, Armenia =

Balak Բալաք
- Location within Armenia Location within Syunik Province
- Coordinates: 39°32′24″N 45°56′20″E
- Country: Armenia
- Province: Syunik
- Municipality: Sisian

Area
  - Total: 10.68 km^{2} (4.12 sq mi)

Population (2011)
  - Total: 174
  - Density: 16.3/km^{2} (42.2/sq mi)
- Time zone: UTC+4 (AMT)

Balak (Armenian: Բալաք) is a village in the Sisian Municipality of the Syunik Province in Armenia.

== Demographics ==
The Statistical Committee of Armenia reported its population as 213 in 2010, down from 223 at the 2001 census.
