= Arevis =

Arevis Արևիս
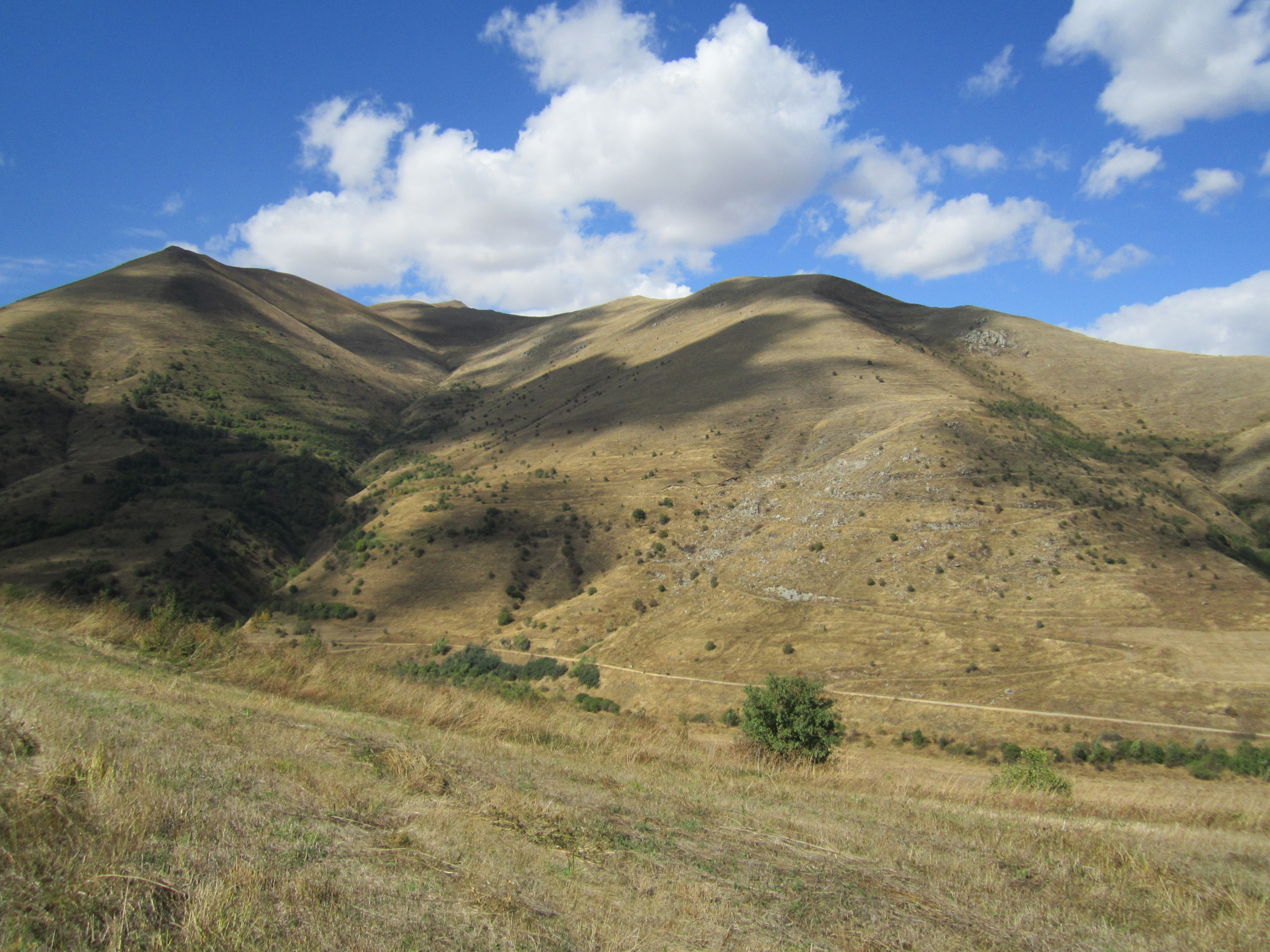

- Location within Armenia Location within Syunik Province
- Coordinates: 39°24′18″N 45°54′04″E
- Country: Armenia
- Province: Syunik
- Municipality: Sisian

Area
  - Total: 18.30 km^{2} (7.07 sq mi)

Population (2011)
  - Total: 54
  - Density: 3.0/km^{2} (7.6/sq mi)
- Time zone: UTC+4 (AMT)

Arevis (Armenian: Արևիս) is a village in the Sisian Municipality of the Syunik Province in Armenia.

== Demographics ==
The Statistical Committee of Armenia reported its population as 140 in 2010, up from 102 at the 2001 census.

== Gallery ==
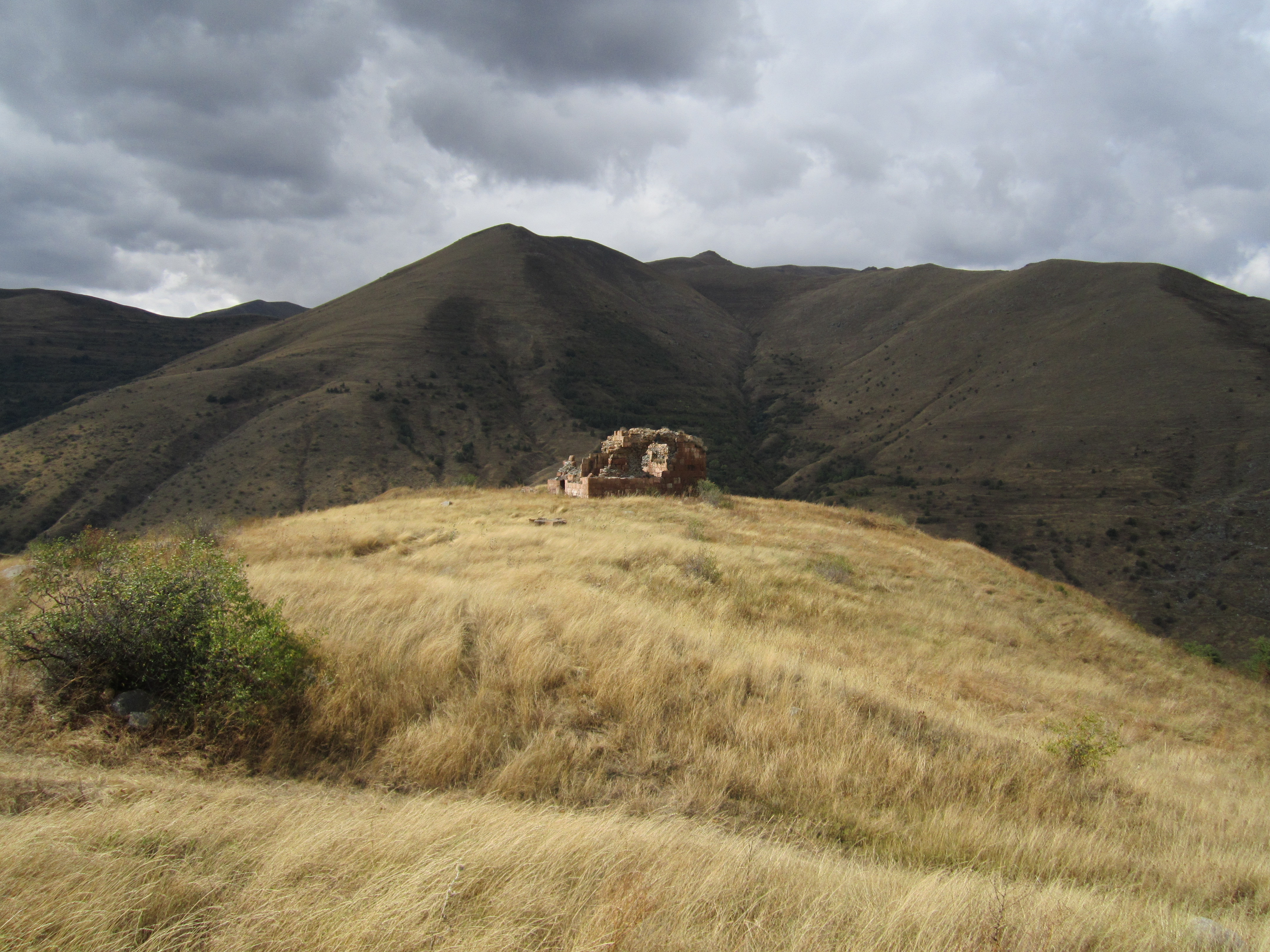
Tanahat church

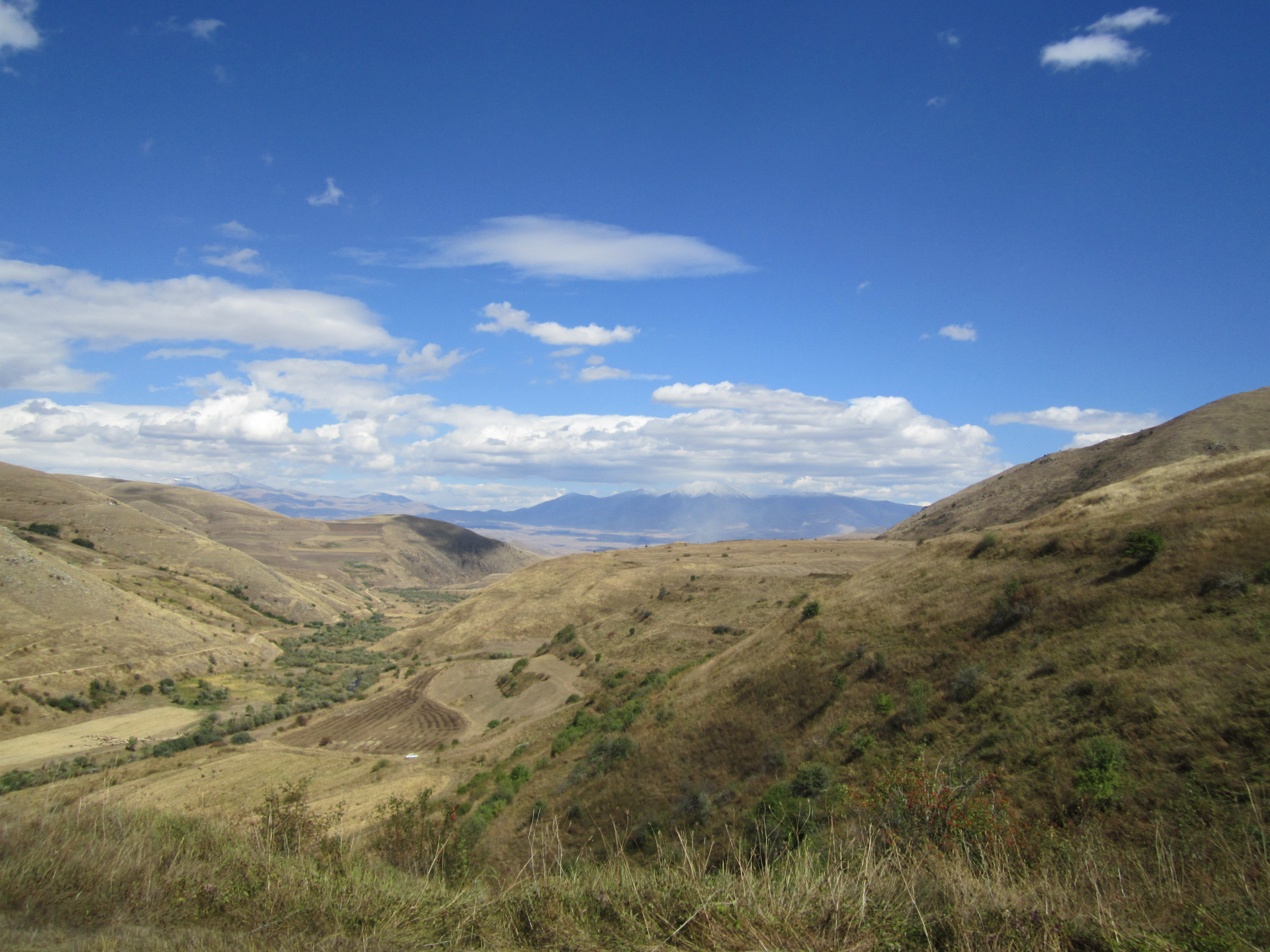
Scenery

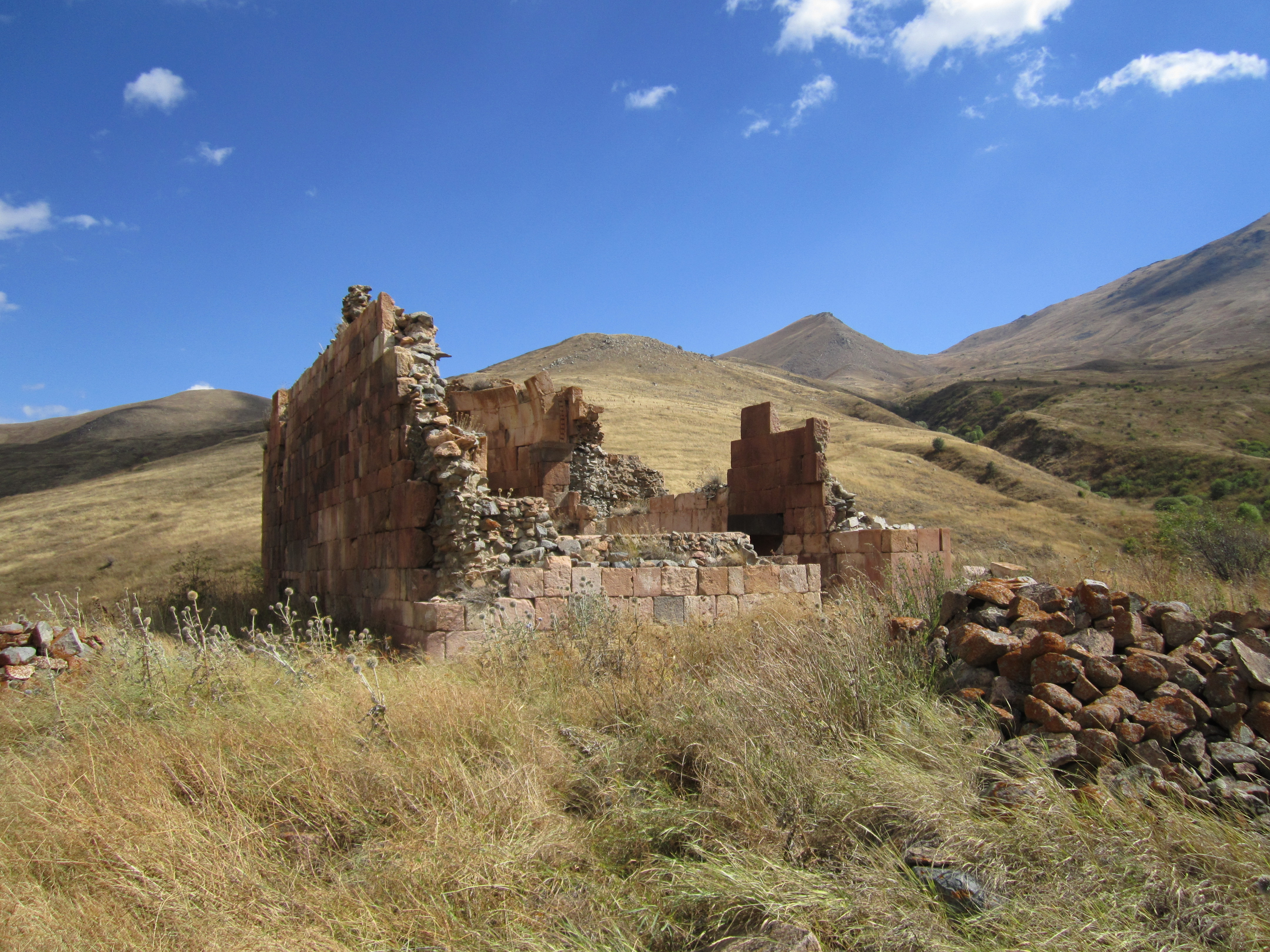
Tanahat church

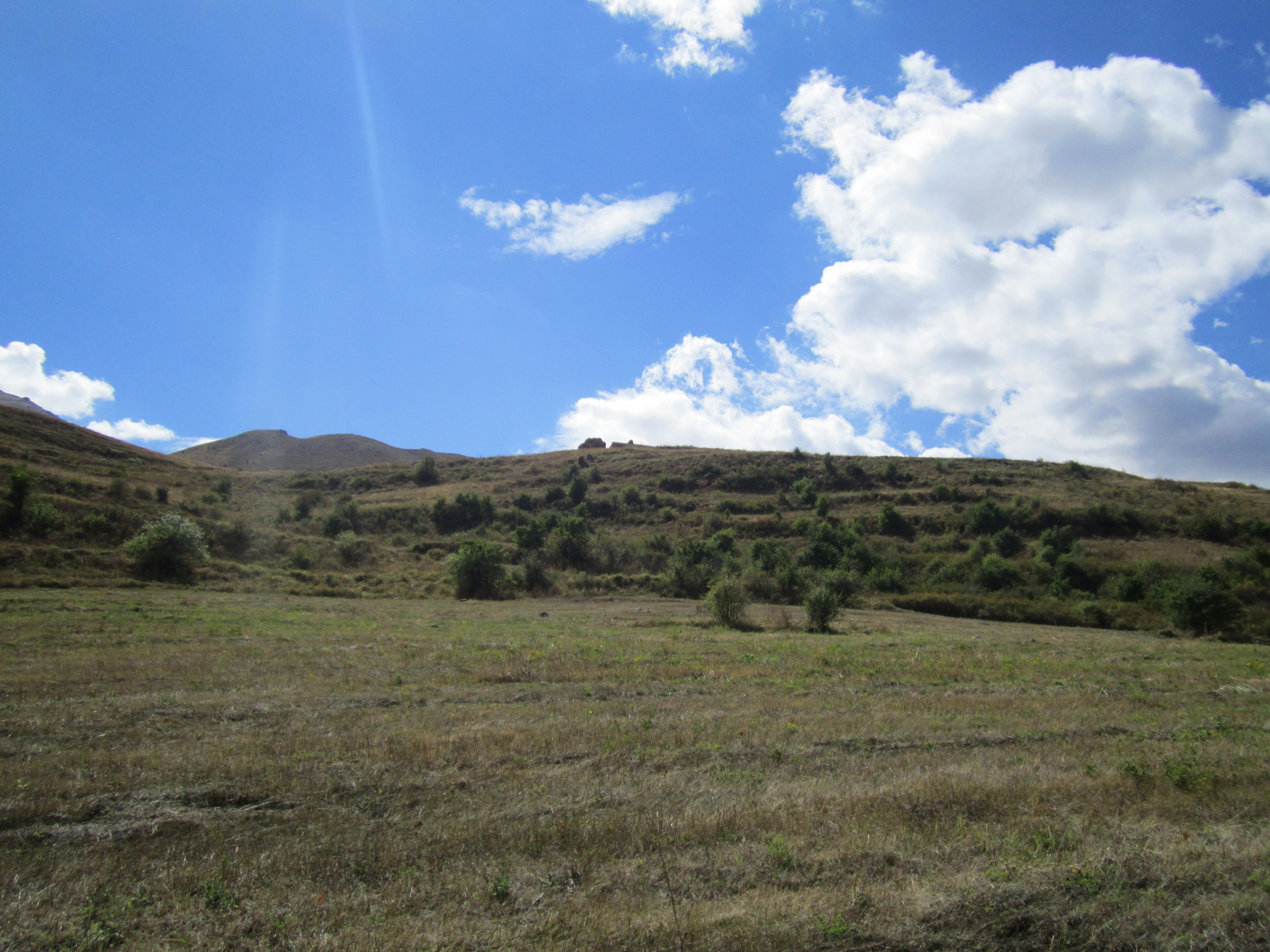
Scenery

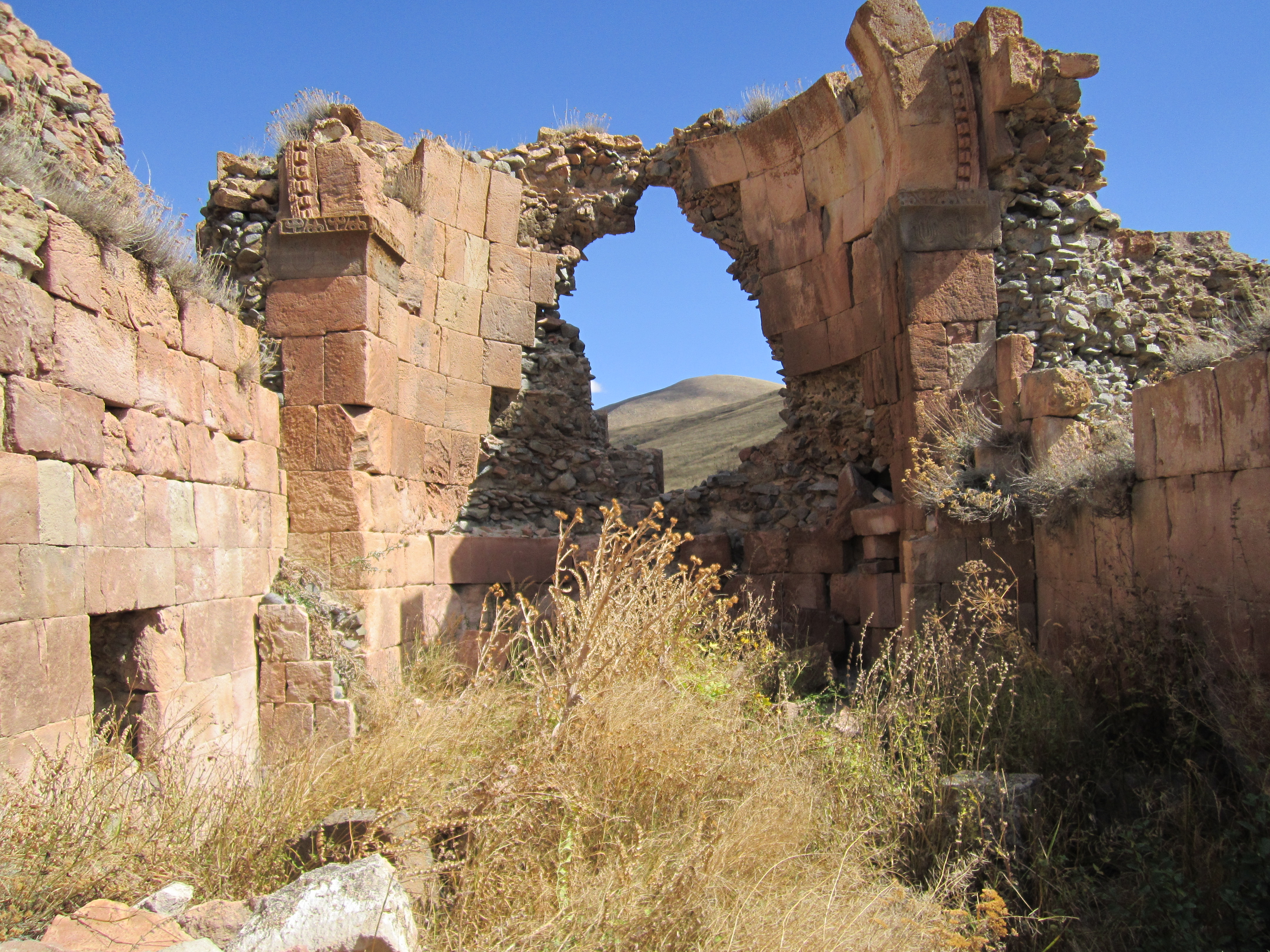
Tanahat church
