= Ashotavan =

Ashotavan Աշոտավան
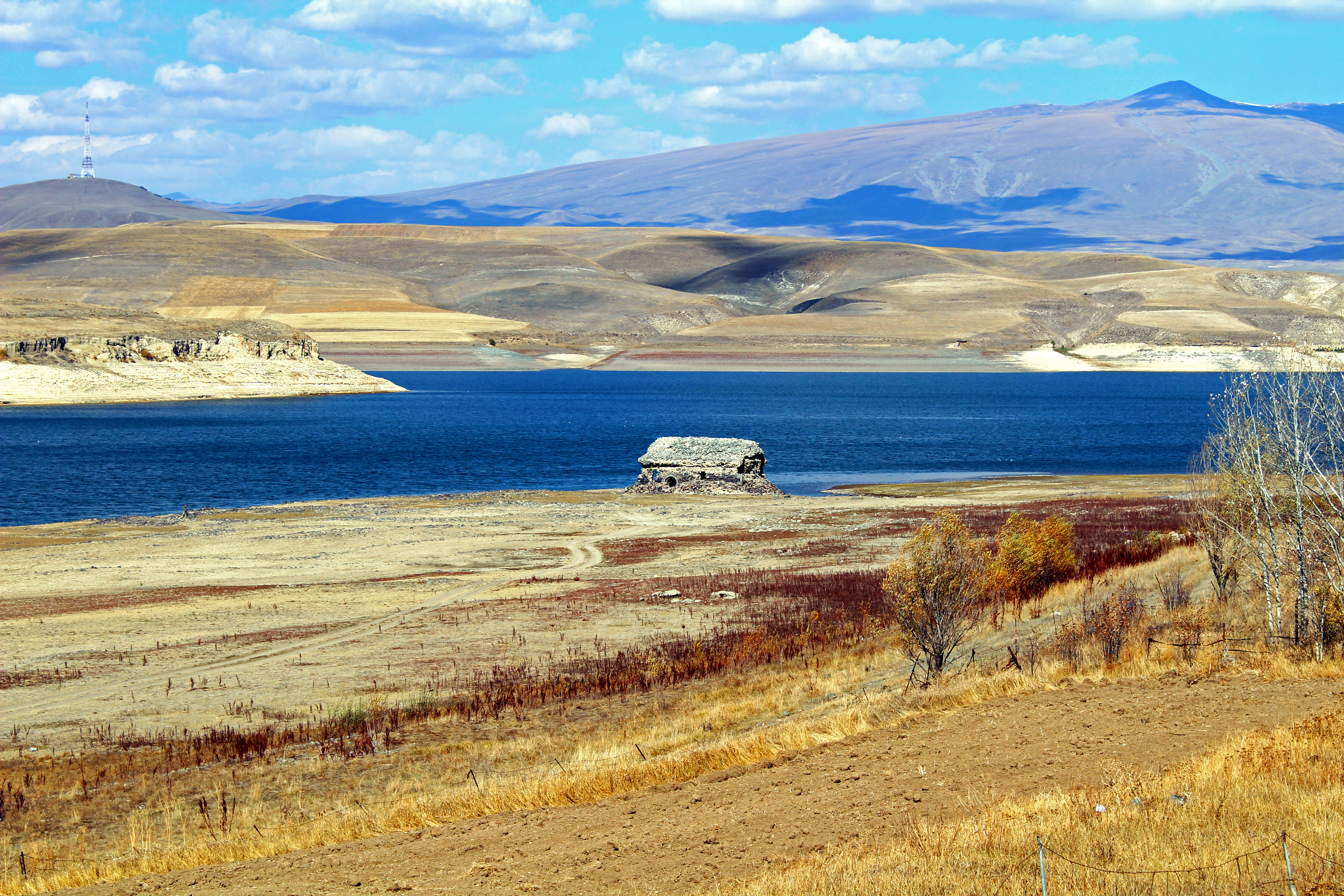

- Location within Armenia Location within Syunik Province
- Coordinates: 39°28′35″N 45°59′52″E
- Country: Armenia
- Province: Syunik
- Municipality: Sisian

Area
  - Total: 17.16 km^{2} (6.63 sq mi)

Population (2011)
  - Total: 589
  - Density: 34.3/km^{2} (88.9/sq mi)
- Time zone: UTC+4 (AMT)

Ashotavan (Armenian: Աշոտավան) is a village in the Sisian Municipality of the Syunik Province in Armenia.

== Etymology ==
The village was previously known as Aghkend, Tazakend, Khnok, and Kirakosik.

== Demographics ==
The Statistical Committee of Armenia reported its population as 647 in 2010, up from 623 at the 2001 census.

== Gallery ==
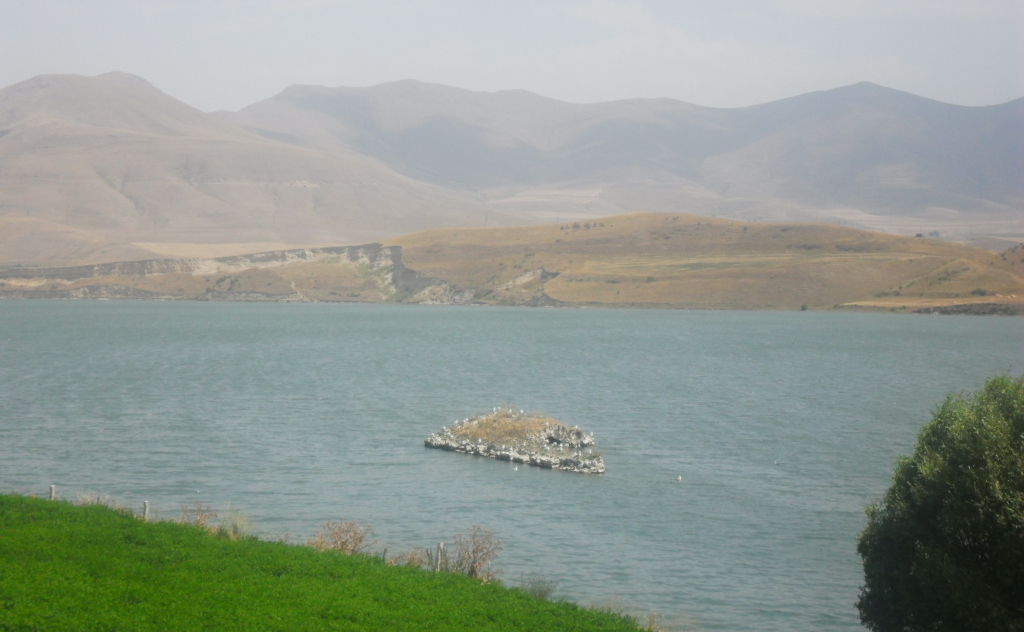

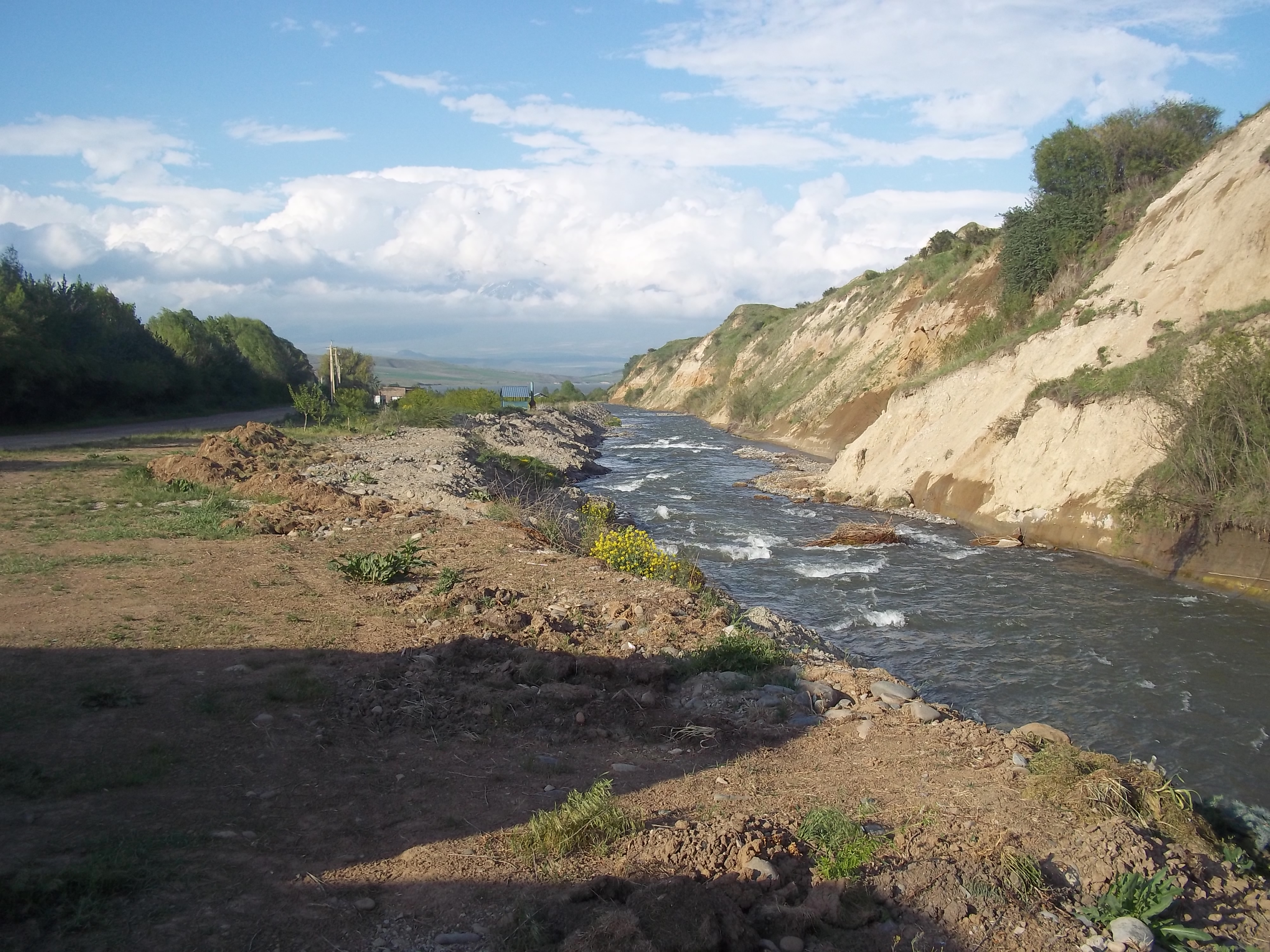

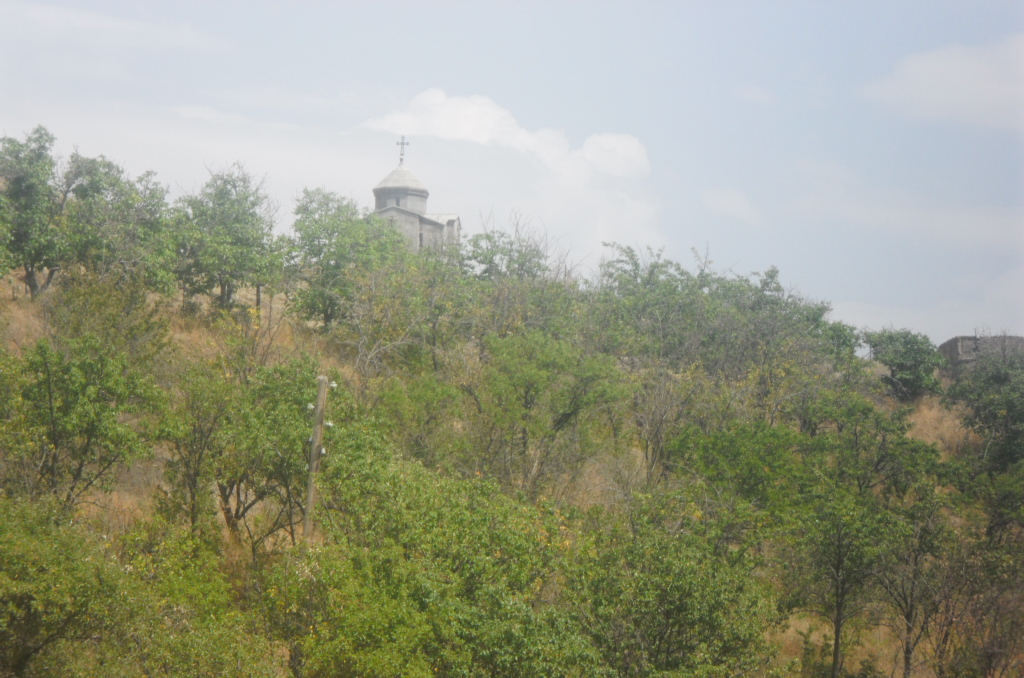

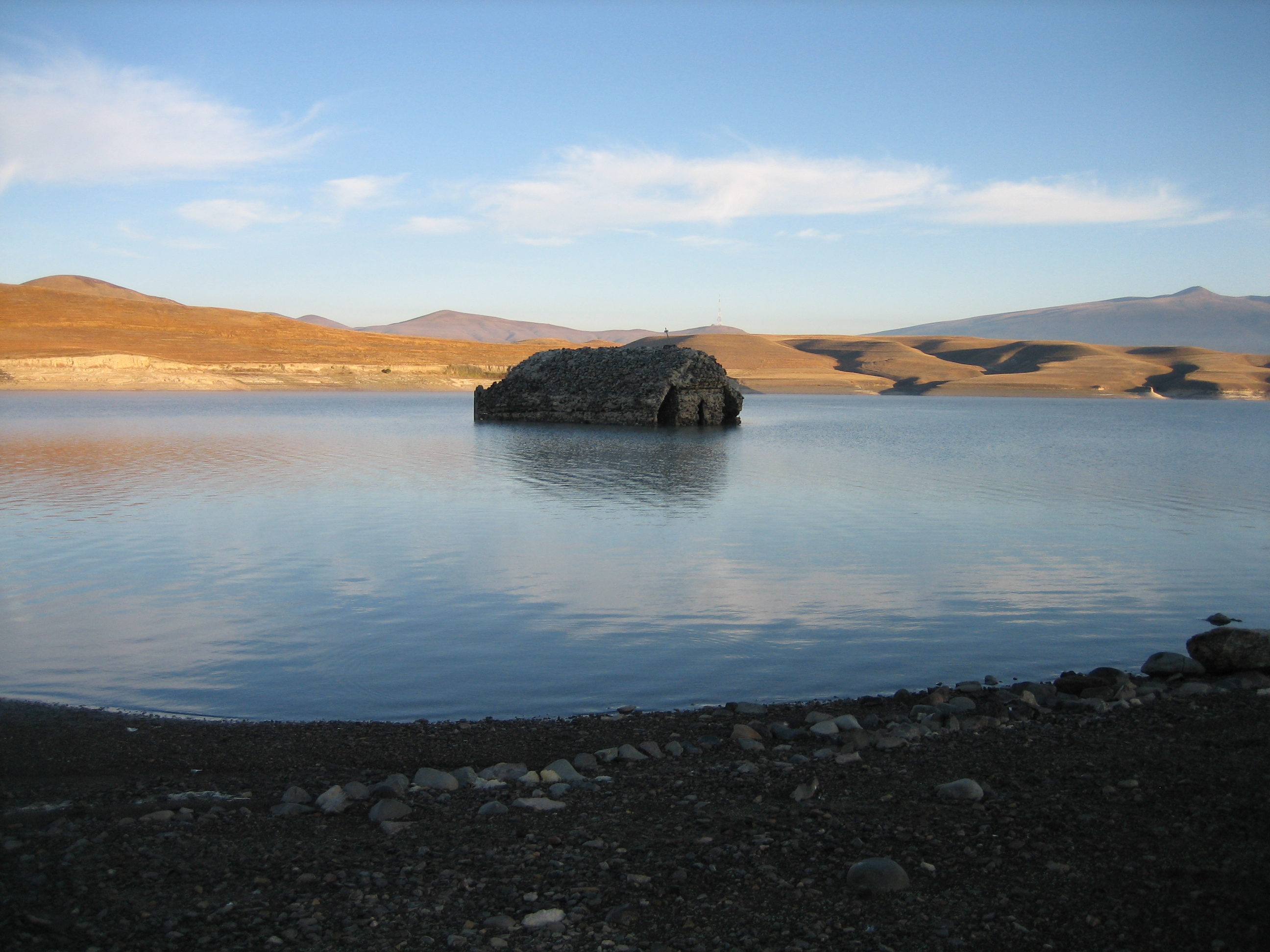

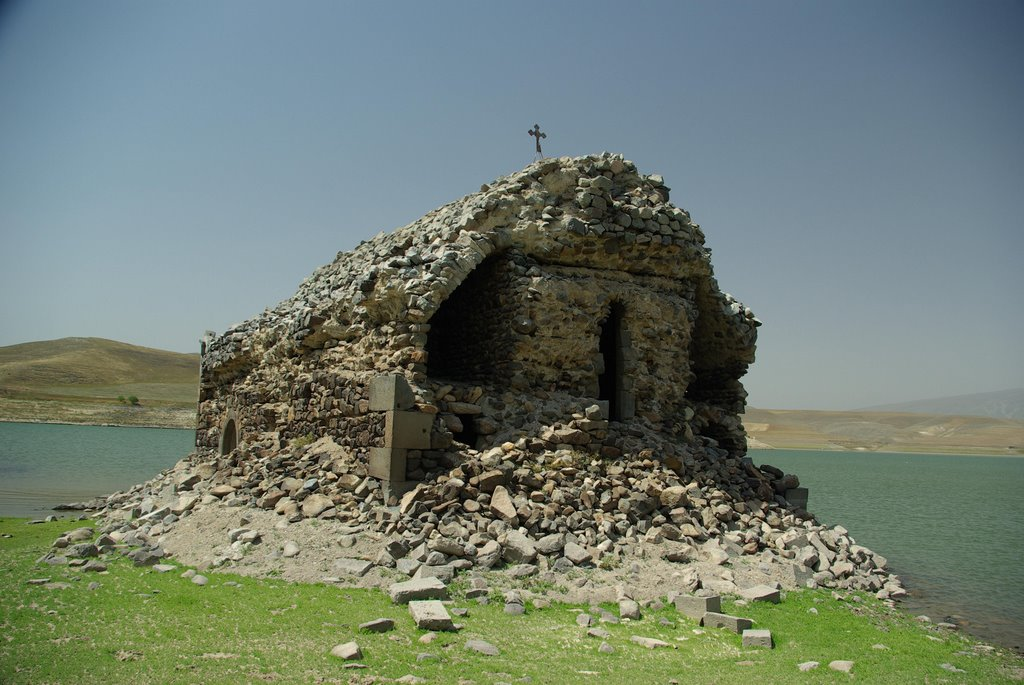
