= Tolors =

Tolors Տոլորս
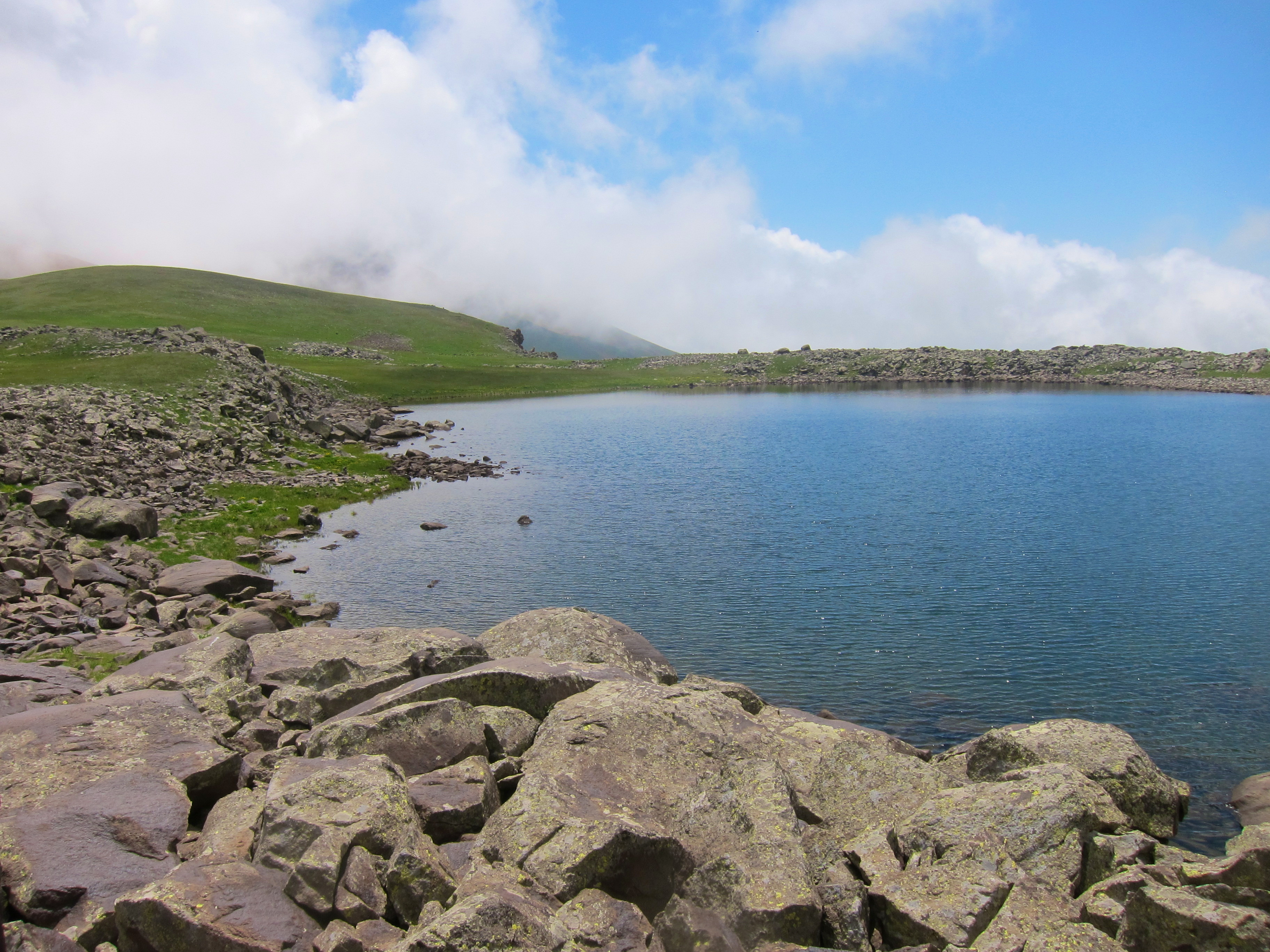
- Tolors reservoir

- Location within Armenia Location within Syunik Province
- Coordinates: 39°27′38″N 46°02′46″E
- Country: Armenia
- Province: Syunik
- Municipality: Sisian

Area
  - Total: 20.85 km^{2} (8.05 sq mi)

Population (2011)
  - Total: 332
  - Density: 15.9/km^{2} (41.2/sq mi)
- Time zone: UTC+4 (AMT)

Tolors (Armenian: Տոլորս) is a village in the Sisian Municipality of the Syunik Province in Armenia.

== Demographics ==
The Statistical Committee of Armenia reported its population was 450 in 2010, up from 406 at the 2001 census.

== Gallery ==
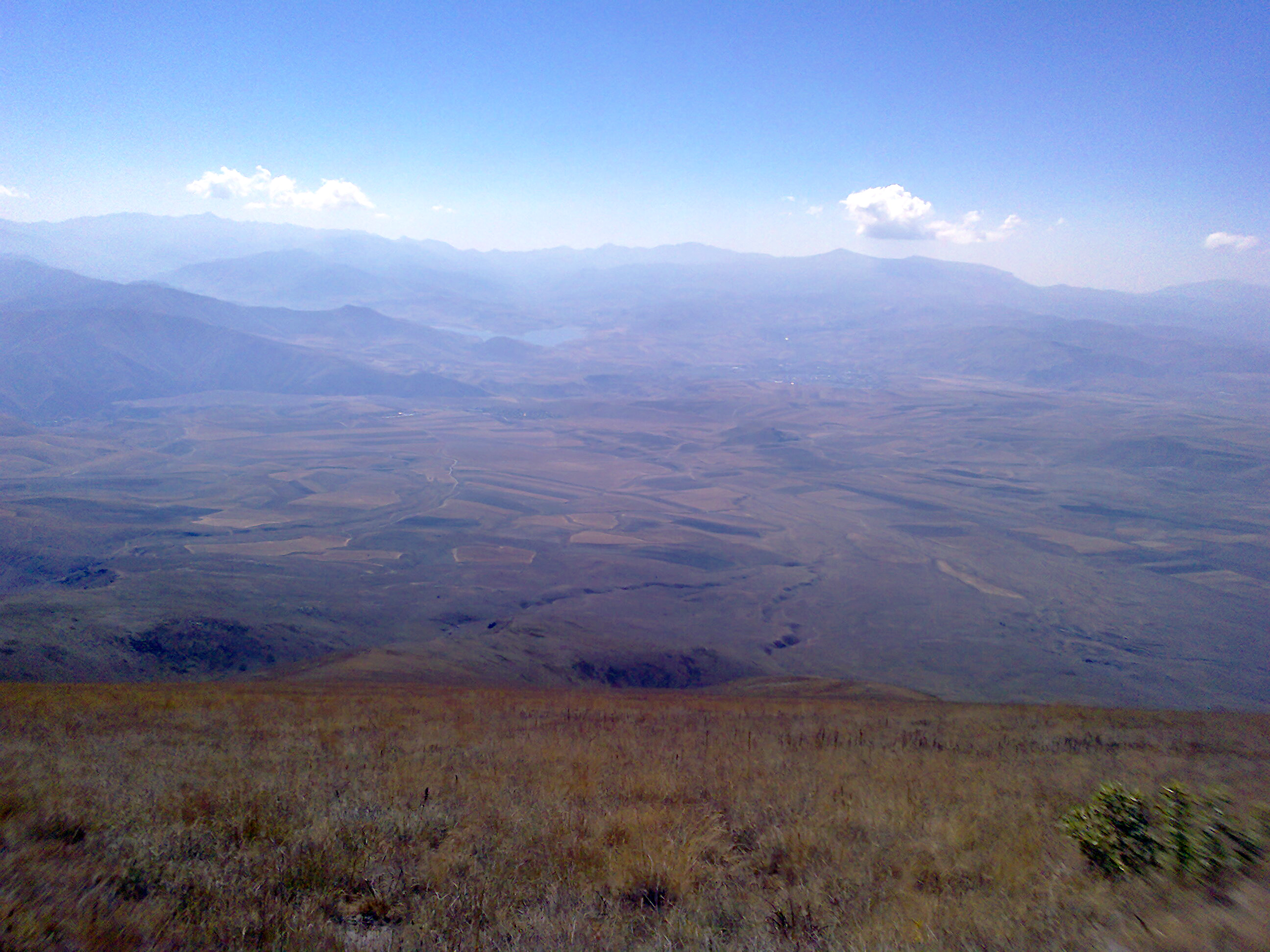
Scenery around Tolors water reservoir
