= Uyts =

Uyts Ույծ
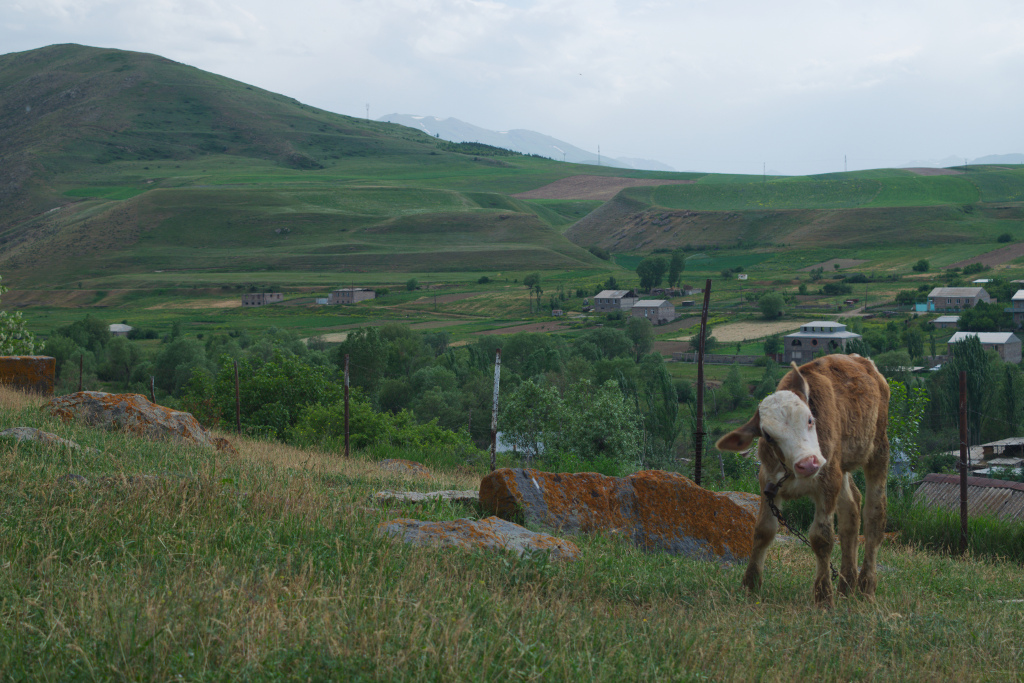
- A hillside overlooking Uyts

- Location within Armenia Location within Syunik Province
- Coordinates: 39°31′N 46°03′E
- Country: Armenia
- Province: Syunik
- Municipality: Sisian

Area
  - Total: 33.43 km^{2} (12.91 sq mi)

Population (2011)
  - Total: 396
  - Density: 11.8/km^{2} (30.7/sq mi)
- Time zone: UTC+4 (AMT)

Uyts (Armenian: Ույծ) is a village in the Sisian Municipality of the Syunik Province in Armenia. Uyts lies roughly 3.5 kilometers away from the nearby city of Sisian.

== Economy and culture ==
Many residents are farmers or sheepherders, with agriculture playing an important role in village life. Uyts has a small school, with roughly 70 students enrolled at any given time. Many teachers commute from neighboring Sisian to work in the village.

== Demographics ==
The Statistical Committee of Armenia reported its population was 586 in 2010, compared to 453 at the 2001 census.

== Gallery ==
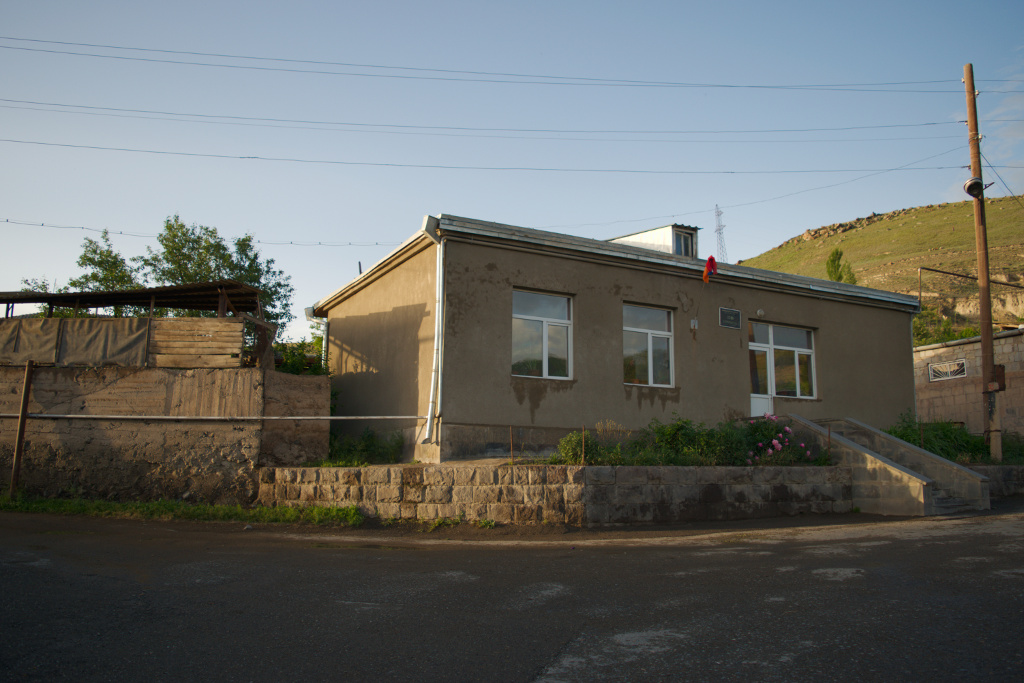
The mayor's office in Uyts
