= Ishkhanasar =

Ishkhanasar Իշխանասար
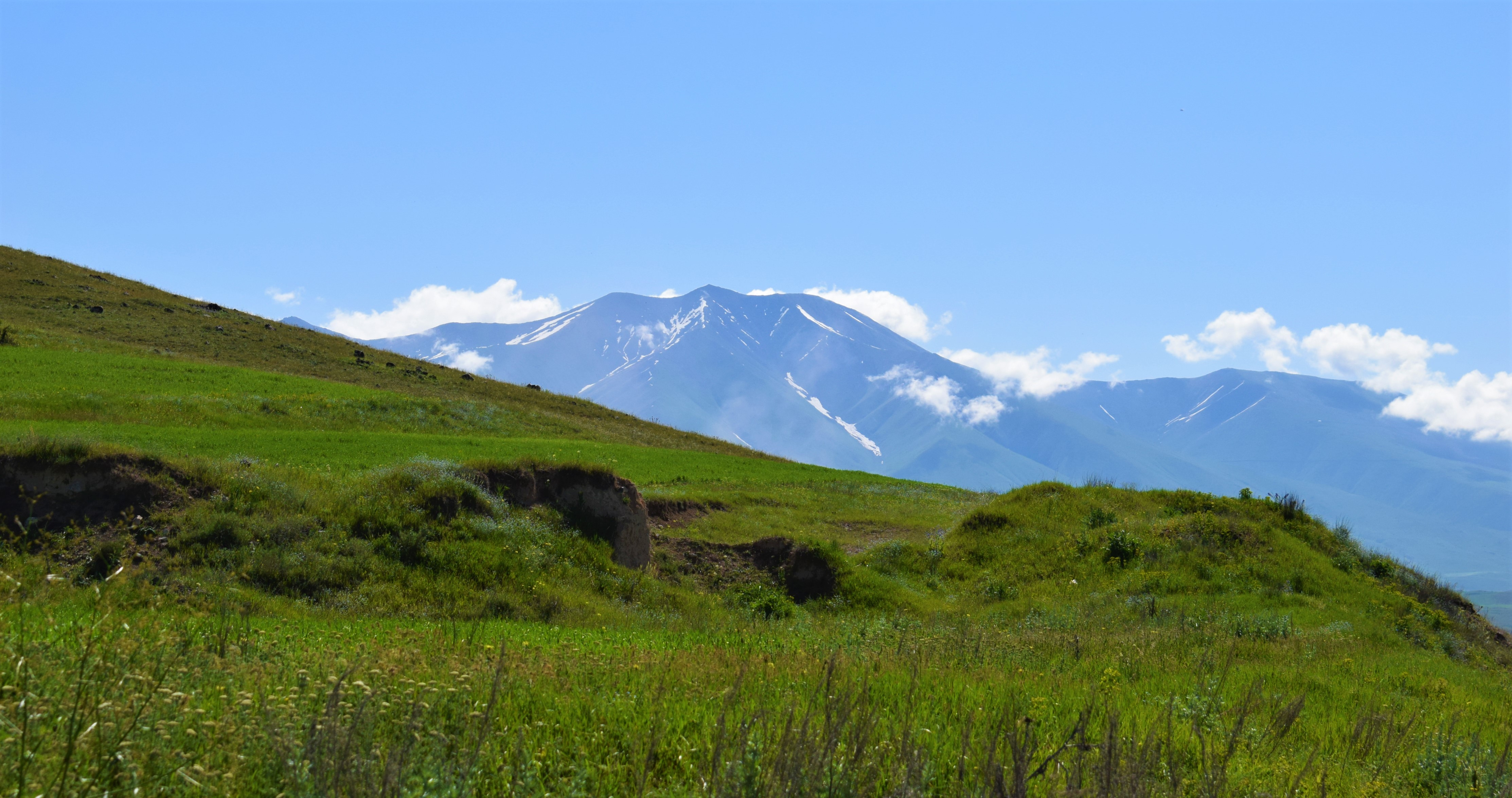
- Scenery around nearby mountain Mets Ishkhanasar

- Location within Armenia Location within Syunik Province
- Coordinates: 39°33′36″N 46°02′37″E
- Country: Armenia
- Province: Syunik
- Municipality: Sisian

Area
  - Total: 12.75 km^{2} (4.92 sq mi)

Population (2011)
  - Total: 294
  - Density: 23.1/km^{2} (59.7/sq mi)
- Time zone: UTC+4 (AMT)

Ishkhanasar (Armenian: Իշխանասար) is a village in the Sisian Municipality of the Syunik Province in Armenia.

The village is close to the Azerbaijani border, which until 2020 was controlled by the Armenian Republic of Artsakh. During the Second Nagorno-Karabakh War the village was shelled by Azerbaijan.

== Demographics ==
The Statistical Committee of Armenia reported its population as 271 in 2010, up from 147 at the 2001 census.

== Gallery ==
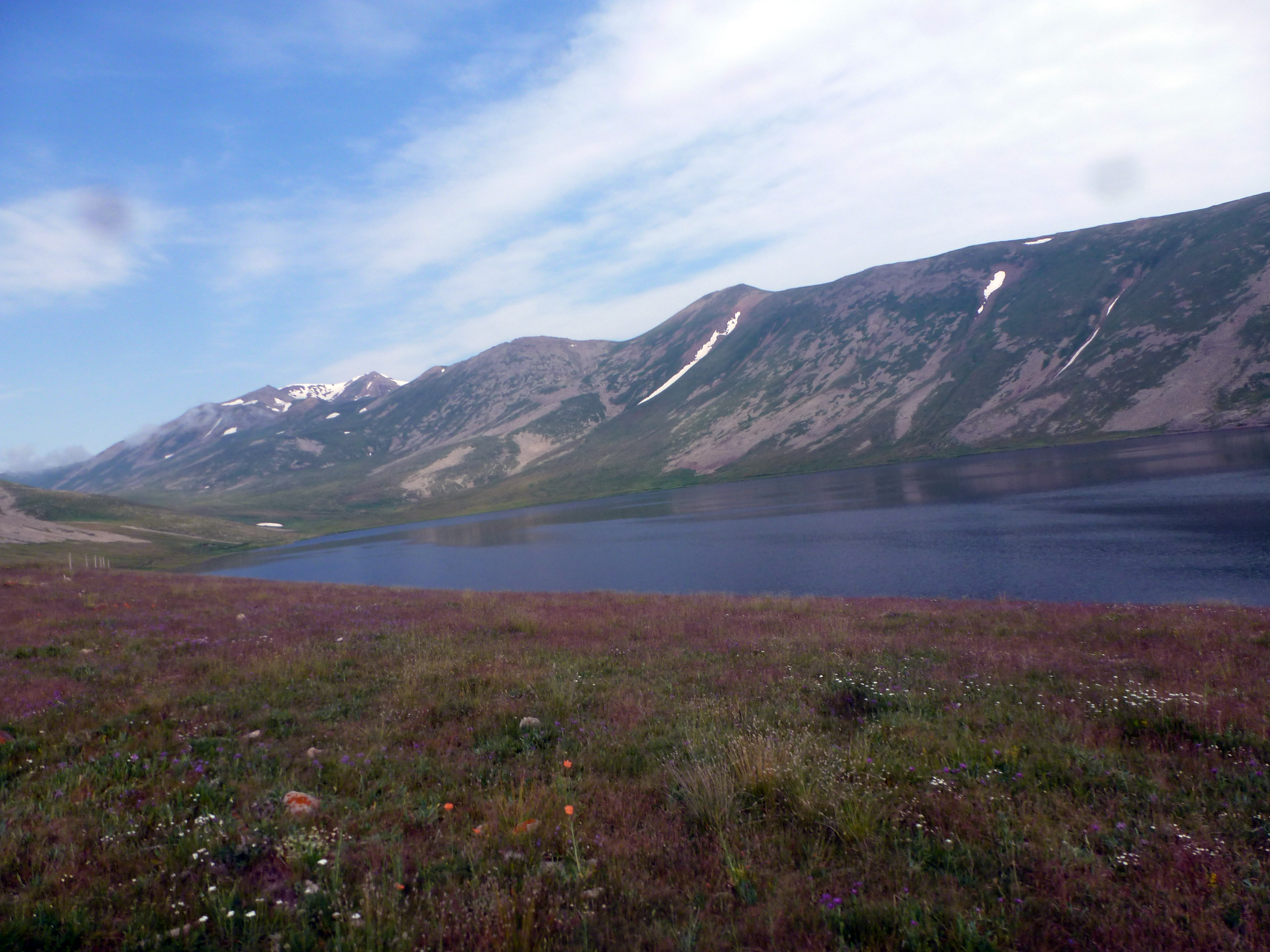
Scenery around Mets Ishkhanasar, several kilometers to the east of the village, near the Armenia–Azerbaijan border

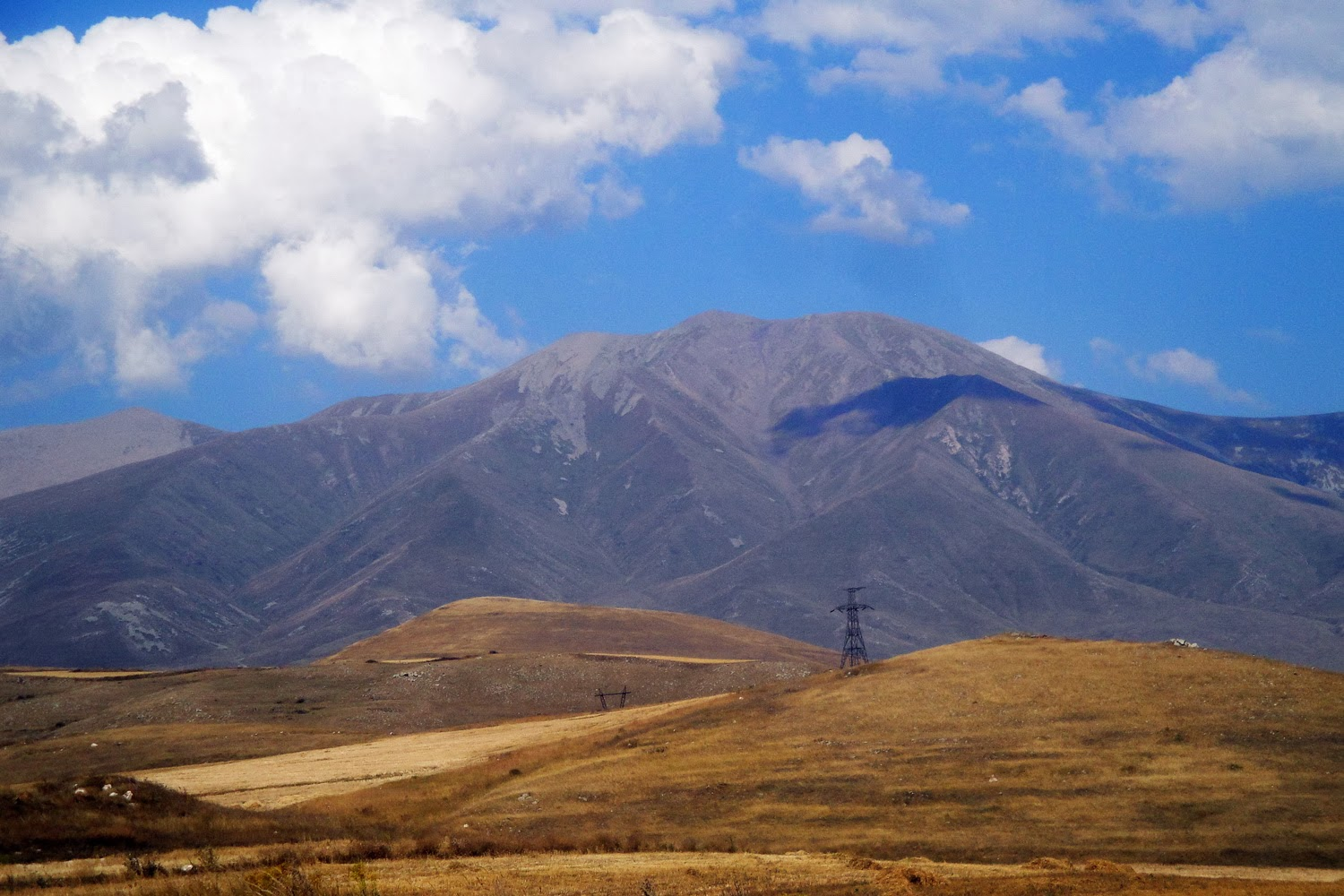
Scenery around Mets Ishkhanasar

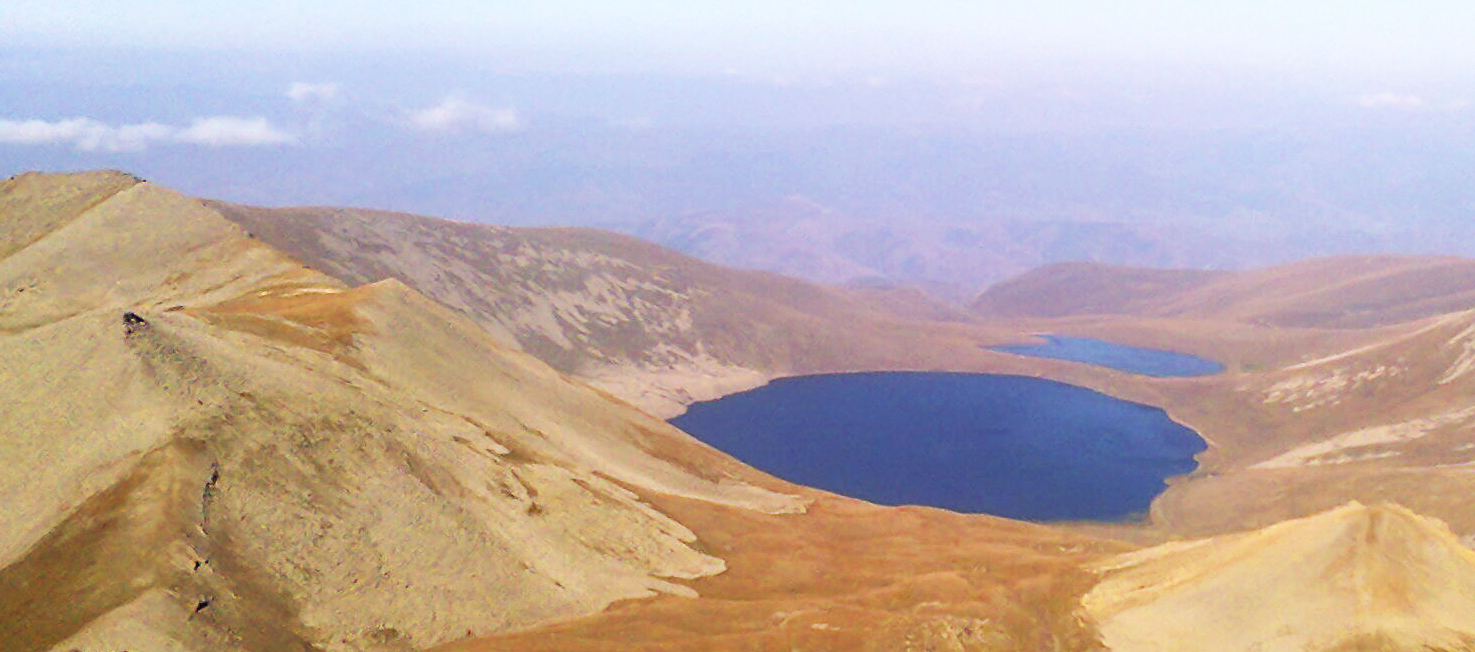
Lake Sev (Armenian: Սև լիճ, romanized: Sev Lich, lit. 'Black Lake'), located to the east of Mets Ishkhanasar

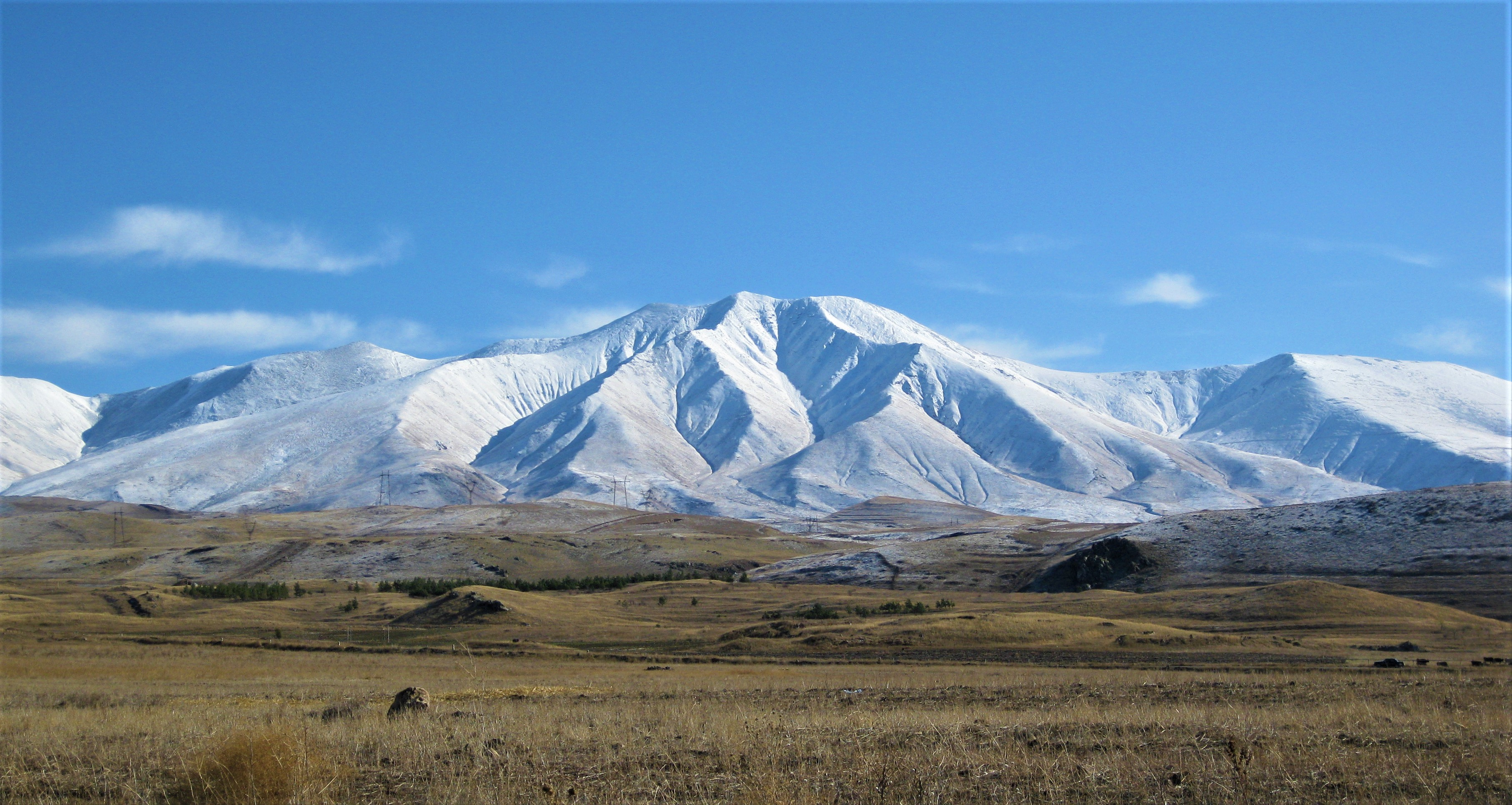
Mets Ishkhanasar
