= Torunik =

Torunik Տորունիք
- Location within Armenia Location within Syunik Province
- Coordinates: 39°24′41″N 46°01′12″E
- Country: Armenia
- Province: Syunik
- Municipality: Sisian

Area
  - Total: 18.61 km^{2} (7.19 sq mi)

Population (2011)
  - Total: 120
  - Density: 6.4/km^{2} (17/sq mi)
- Time zone: UTC+4 (AMT)

Torunik (Armenian: Տորունիք) is a village in the Sisian Municipality of the Syunik Province in Armenia.

== Demographics ==
The Statistical Committee of Armenia reported its population was 138 in 2010, down from 181 at the 2001 census.
