= Akhlatyan =

Akhlatyan Ախլաթյան
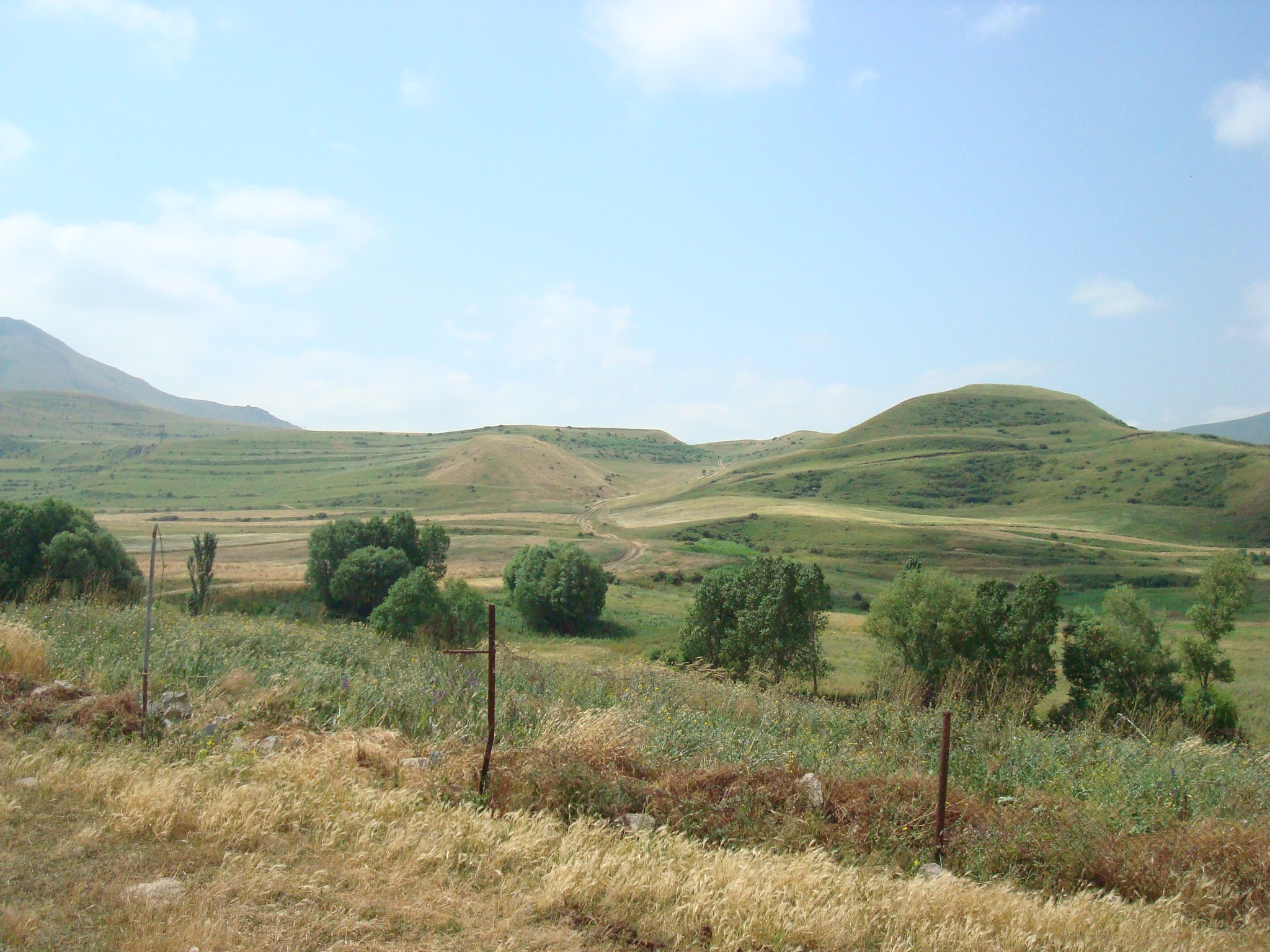

- Location within Armenia Location within Syunik Province
- Coordinates: 39°26′32″N 46°02′07″E
- Country: Armenia
- Province: Syunik
- Municipality: Sisian

Area
  - Total: 33.91 km^{2} (13.09 sq mi)

Population (2011)
  - Total: 535
  - Density: 15.8/km^{2} (40.9/sq mi)
- Time zone: UTC+4 (AMT)

Akhlatyan (Armenian: Ախլաթյան) is a village in the Sisian Municipality of the Syunik Province in Armenia.

== Demographics ==
The Statistical Committee of Armenia reported its population as 459 in 2010, down from 588 at the 2001 census.
