= Salvard =

Salvard Սալվարդ
- Location within Armenia Location within Syunik Province
- Coordinates: 39°27′52″N 45°55′26″E
- Country: Armenia
- Province: Syunik
- Municipality: Sisian

Area
  - Total: 31.44 km^{2} (12.14 sq mi)

Population (2011)
  - Total: 263
  - Density: 8.37/km^{2} (21.7/sq mi)
- Time zone: UTC+4 (AMT)

Salvard (Armenian: Սալվարդ) is a village in the Sisian Municipality of the Syunik Province in Armenia.

== Toponymy ==
The village was previously known as Alilu.

== Demographics ==
The Statistical Committee of Armenia reported its population was 396 in 2010, down from 418 at the 2001 census.
