= Shaghat =

Shaghat Շաղատ
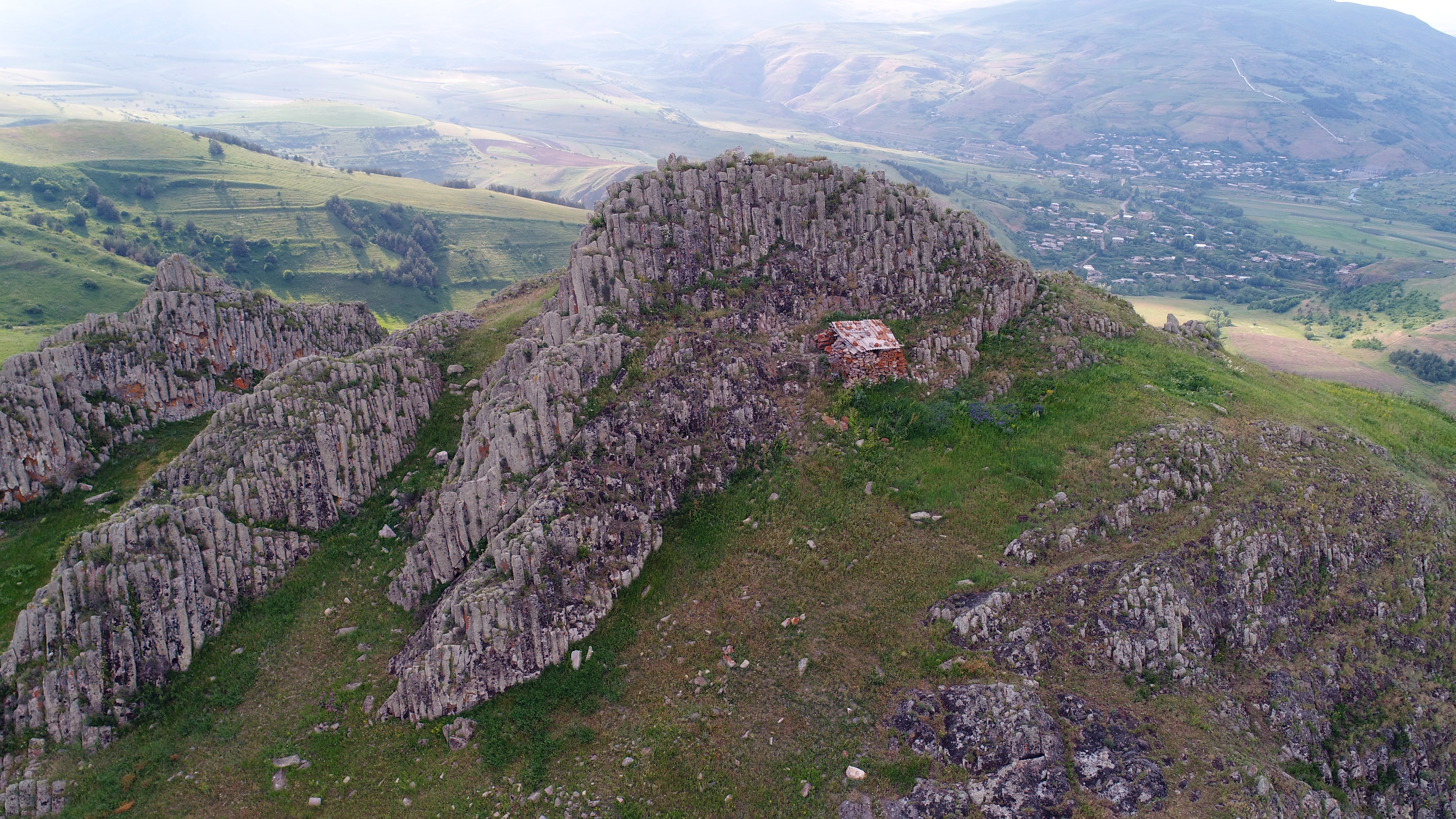

- Location within Armenia Location within Syunik Province
- Coordinates: 39°33′42″N 45°54′44″E
- Country: Armenia
- Province: Syunik
- Municipality: Sisian

Area
  - Total: 48.29 km^{2} (18.64 sq mi)

Population (2011)
  - Total: 969
  - Density: 20.1/km^{2} (52.0/sq mi)
- Time zone: UTC+4 (AMT)

Shaghat (Armenian: Շաղատ) is a village in the Sisian Municipality of the Syunik Province in Armenia.

== Demographics ==
The Statistical Committee of Armenia reported its population was 1,219 in 2010, up from 1,049 at the 2001 census.

== Gallery ==
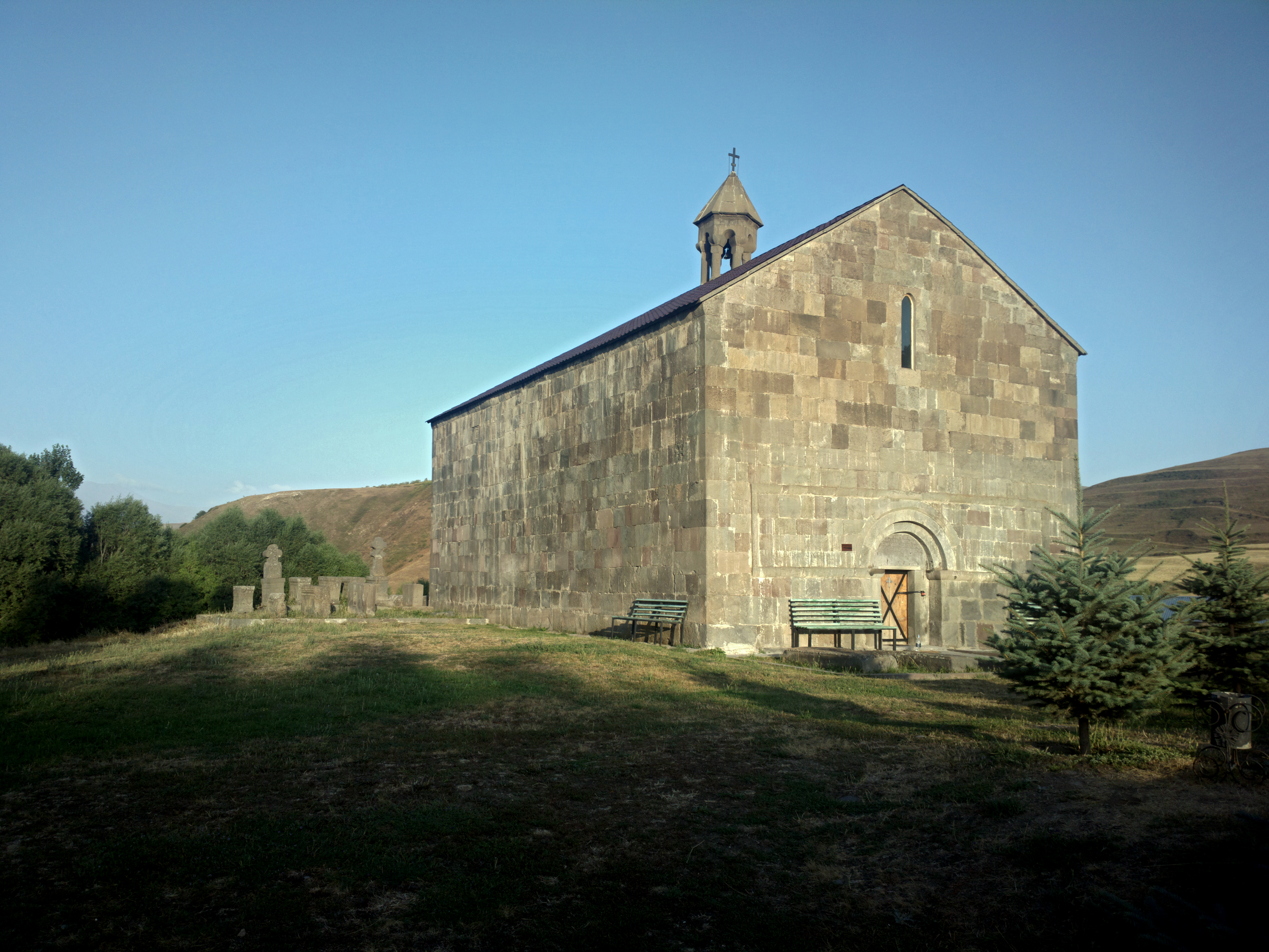
St. Gevorg Church in Shaghat
