= Tasik =

Tasik Թասիկ
- Location within Armenia Location within Syunik Province
- Coordinates: 39°27′N 45°58′E
- Country: Armenia
- Province: Syunik
- Municipality: Sisian

Area
  - Total: 19.14 km^{2} (7.39 sq mi)

Population (2011)
  - Total: 221
  - Density: 11.5/km^{2} (29.9/sq mi)
- Time zone: UTC+4 (AMT)

Tasik (Armenian: Թասիկ) is a village in the Sisian Municipality of the Syunik Province in Armenia.

== Etymology ==
The village was previously known as Ghushchi-Tazakend (Armenian: Ղուշչի-Թազաքենդ).

== Demographics ==
The Statistical Committee of Armenia reported its population as 291 in 2010, up from 274 at the 2001 census.
