= Tsghuk =

Tsghuk Ծղուկ
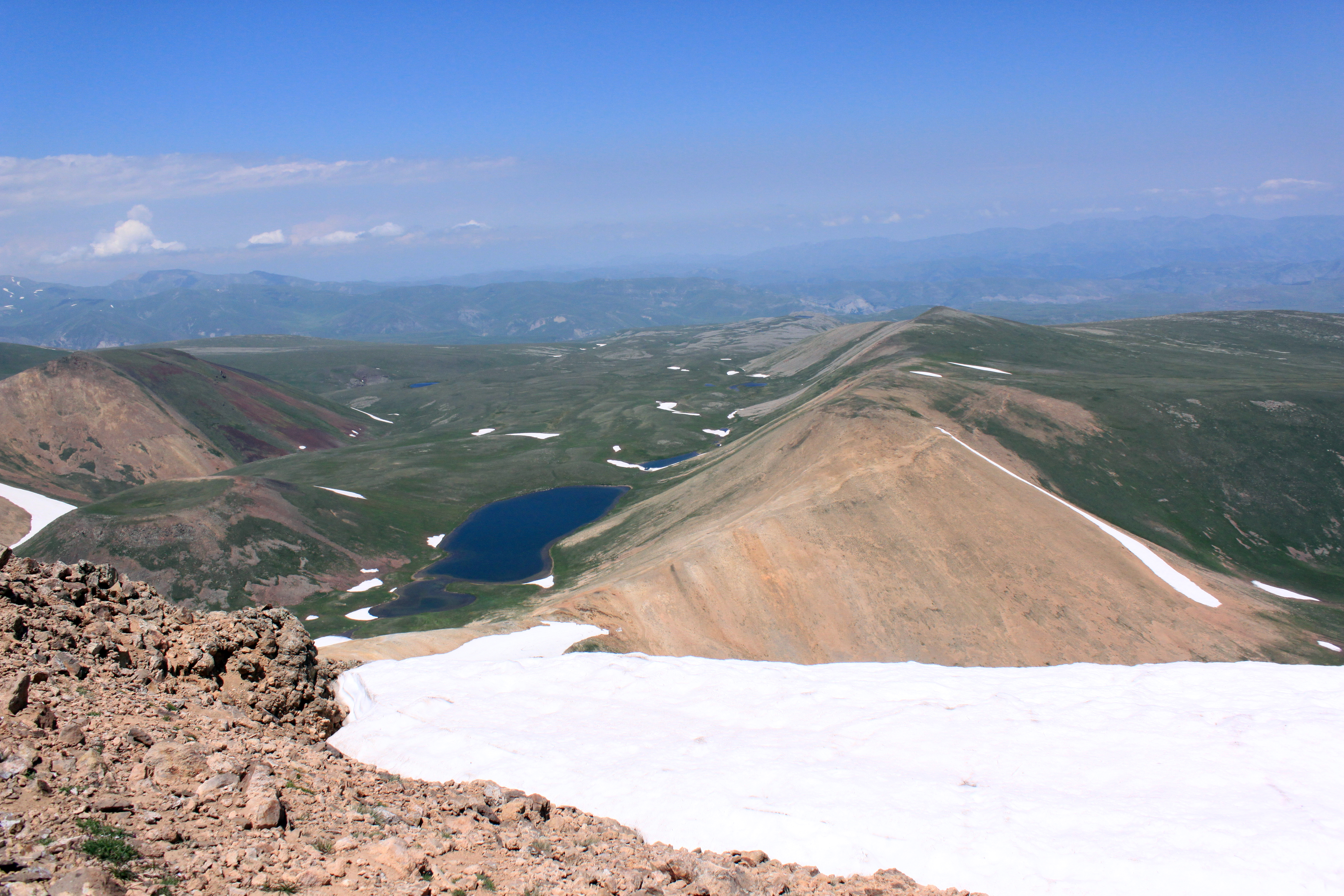
- Scenery around nearby Tsghuk Mountain

- Location within Armenia Location within Syunik Province
- Coordinates: 39°40′04″N 45°51′18″E
- Country: Armenia
- Province: Syunik
- Municipality: Sisian

Area
  - Total: 50.98 km^{2} (19.68 sq mi)

Population (2011)
  - Total: 422
  - Density: 8.28/km^{2} (21.4/sq mi)
- Time zone: UTC+4 (AMT)

Tsghuk (Armenian: Ծղուկ) is a village in the Sisian Municipiality of the Syunik Province in Armenia.

== Toponymy ==
The village was previously known as Haykavan and Borisovka (Russian).

== Geography ==
The village lies on the west side of the Vorotan River, 120 km northwest of the regional center, at an altitude of 2120-2160 m above sea level. Due to the construction of the Spandaryan reservoir, the village was moved 1.5 km to the northeast.

== Historical heritage sites ==
1 km northeast of the village at "Kaler" are ruins of old settlements.

== Economy and culture ==
The population is engaged in animal husbandry and farming.

== Demographics ==
The Statistical Committee of Armenia reported its population as 451 in 2010, up from 427 at the 2001 census.
