= Shamb =

Shamb Շամբ
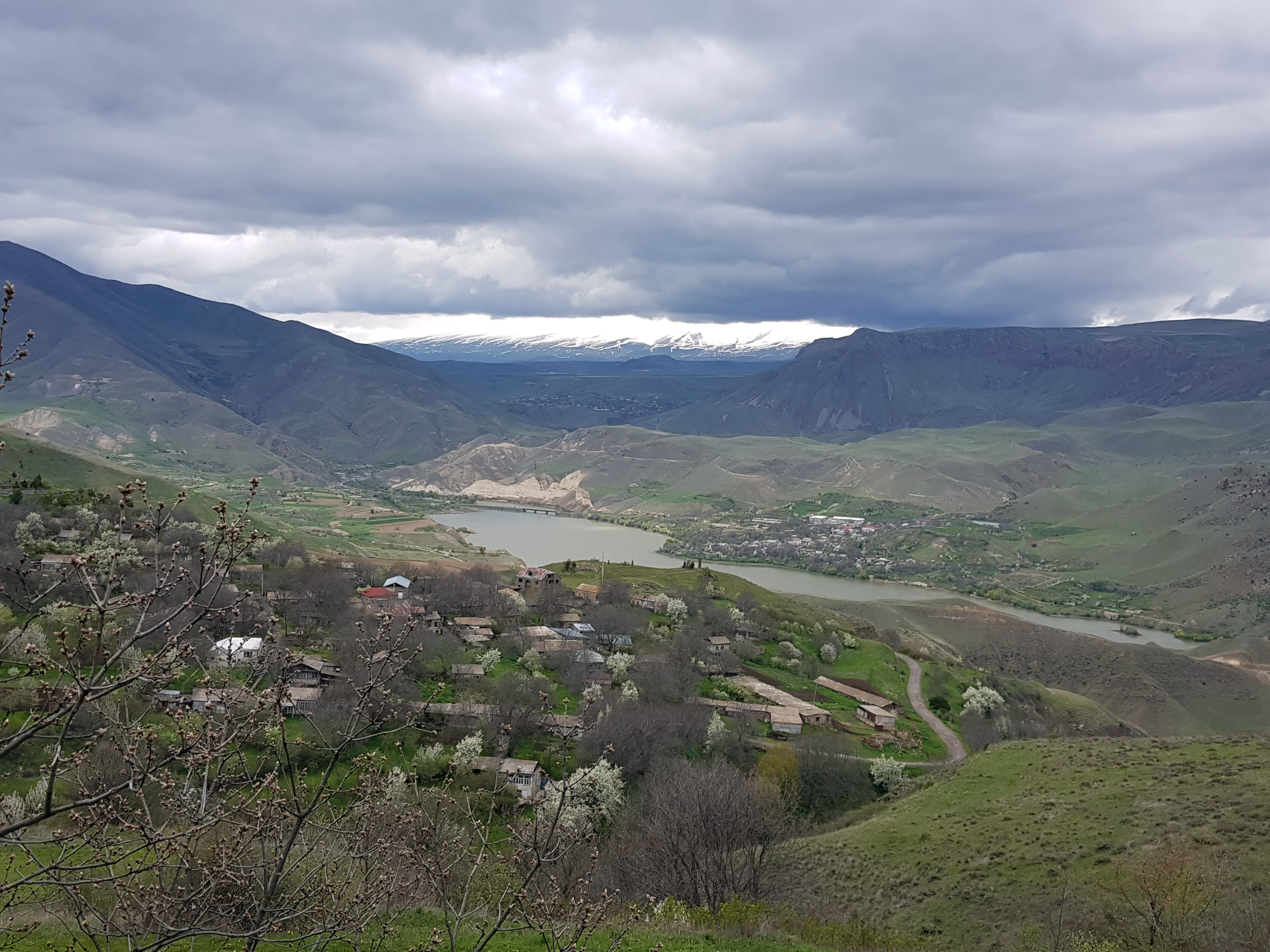
- A view of Shamb

- Location within Armenia Location within Syunik Province
- Coordinates: 39°28′03″N 46°09′00″E
- Country: Armenia
- Province: Syunik
- Municipality: Sisian

Population (2011)
  - Total: 416
- Time zone: UTC+4 (AMT)

Shamb (Armenian: Շամբ) is a village in the Sisian Municipality of the Syunik Province in Armenia.

== Gallery ==
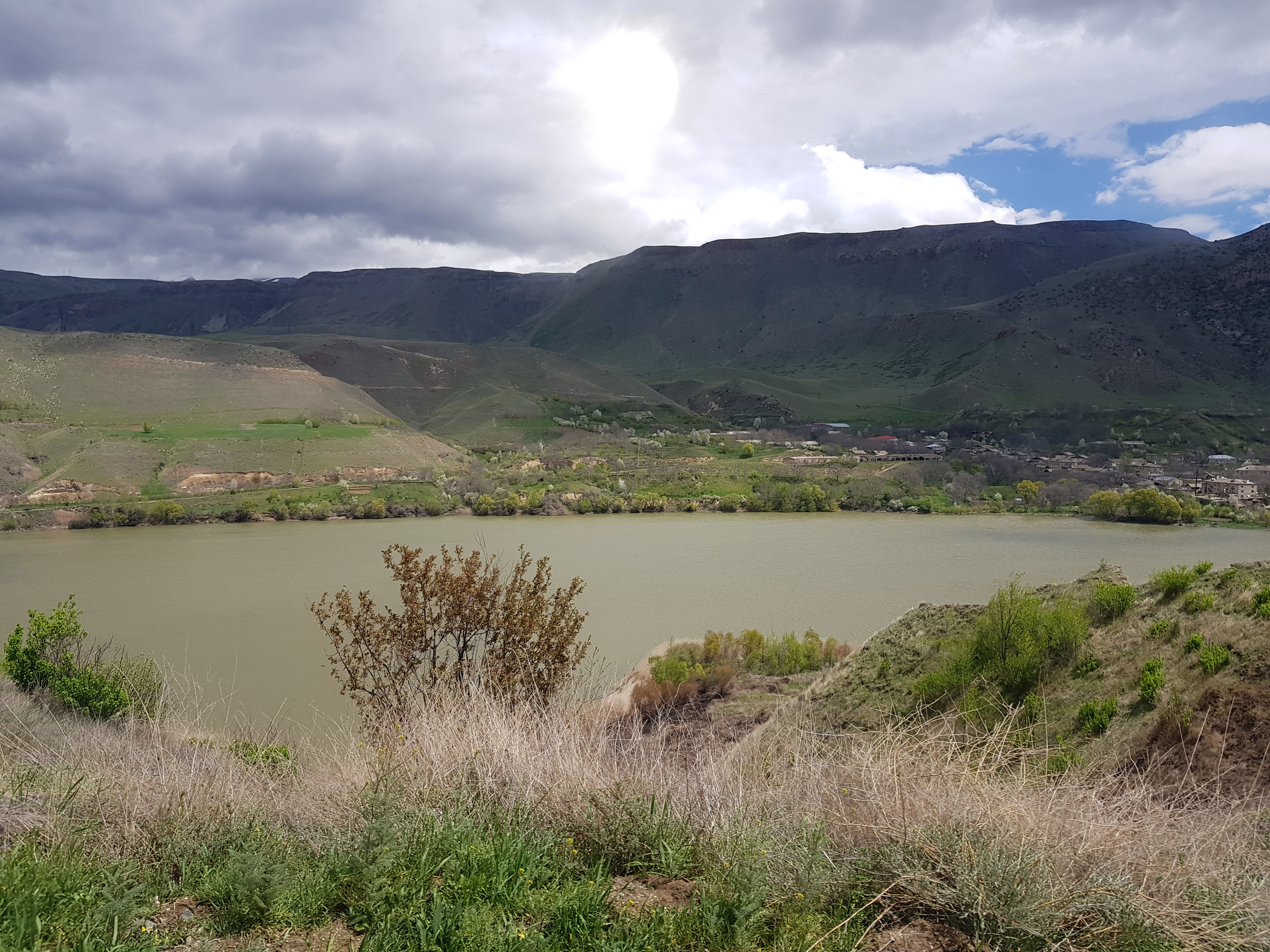
View of Shamb and its surroundings
