= Sarnakunk =

Sarnakunk Սառնակունք
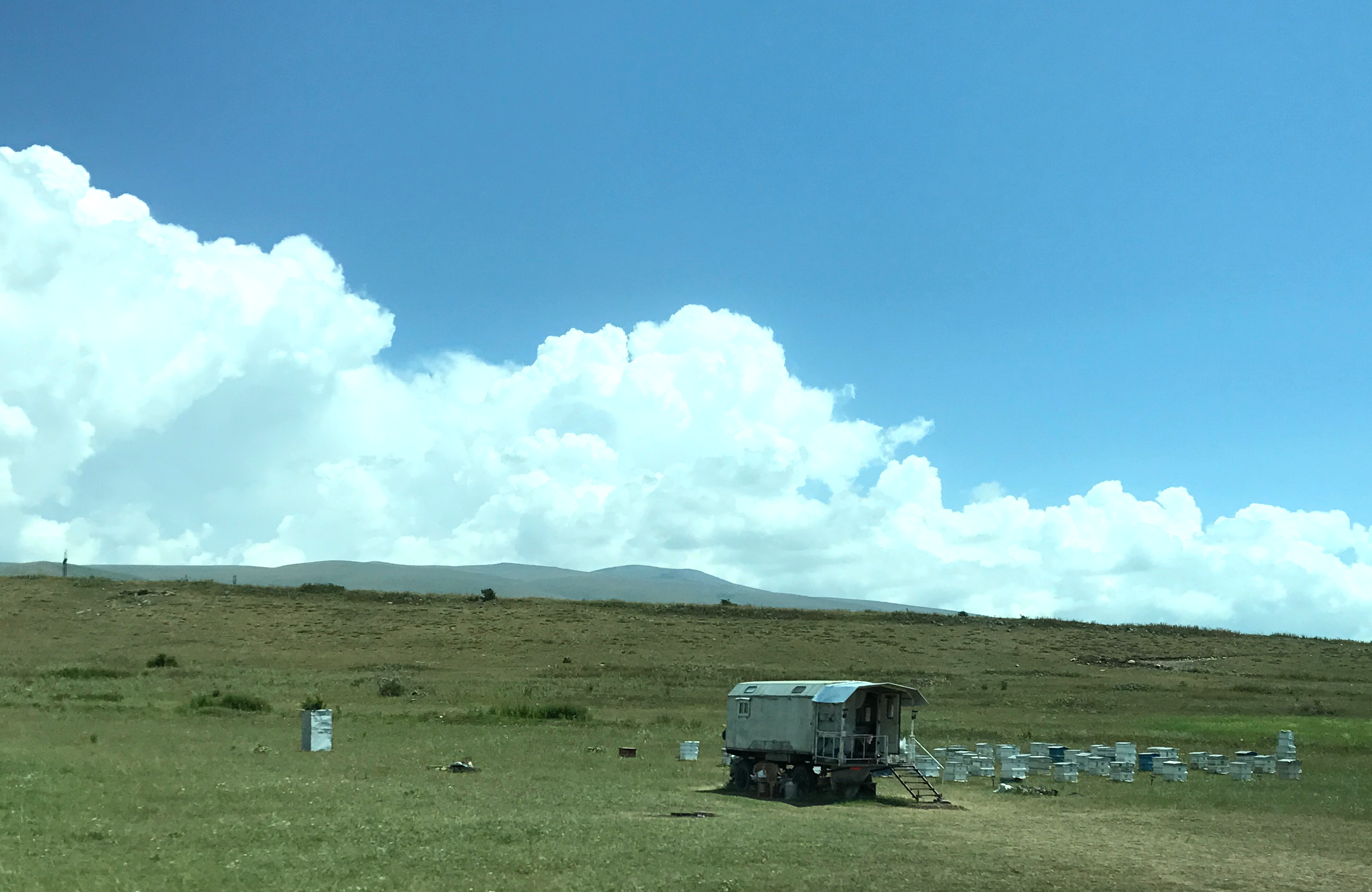
- Scenery around Sarnakunk

- Location within Armenia Location within Syunik Province
- Coordinates: 39°38′53″N 45°53′06″E
- Country: Armenia
- Province: Syunik
- Municipality: Sisian

Area
  - Total: 41.72 km^{2} (16.11 sq mi)
- Elevation: 2,122 m (6,962 ft)

Population (2011)
  - Total: 474
  - Density: 11.4/km^{2} (29.4/sq mi)
- Time zone: UTC+4 (AMT)

Sarnakunk (Armenian: Սառնակունք) is a village in the Sisian Municipality of the Syunik Province in Armenia.

== Toponymy ==
The village was previously known as Saybalu.

== Demographics ==
The Statistical Committee of Armenia reported its population was 303 in 2022, down from 519 at the 2010 census.
