= Tsghuni =

Tsghuni Ցղունի
- Location within Armenia Location within Syunik Province
- Coordinates: 39°21′52″N 45°59′19″E
- Country: Armenia
- Province: Syunik
- Municipality: Sisian

Population (2011)
  - Total: 47
- Time zone: UTC+4 (AMT)

Tsghuni (Armenian: Ցղունի) is a village in the Sisian Municipality of the Syunik Province in Armenia.

== Demographics ==
The population of the village was 71 in the 2001 census.
