= Sisian Municipality =

Sisian Սիսիան
- Urban Community
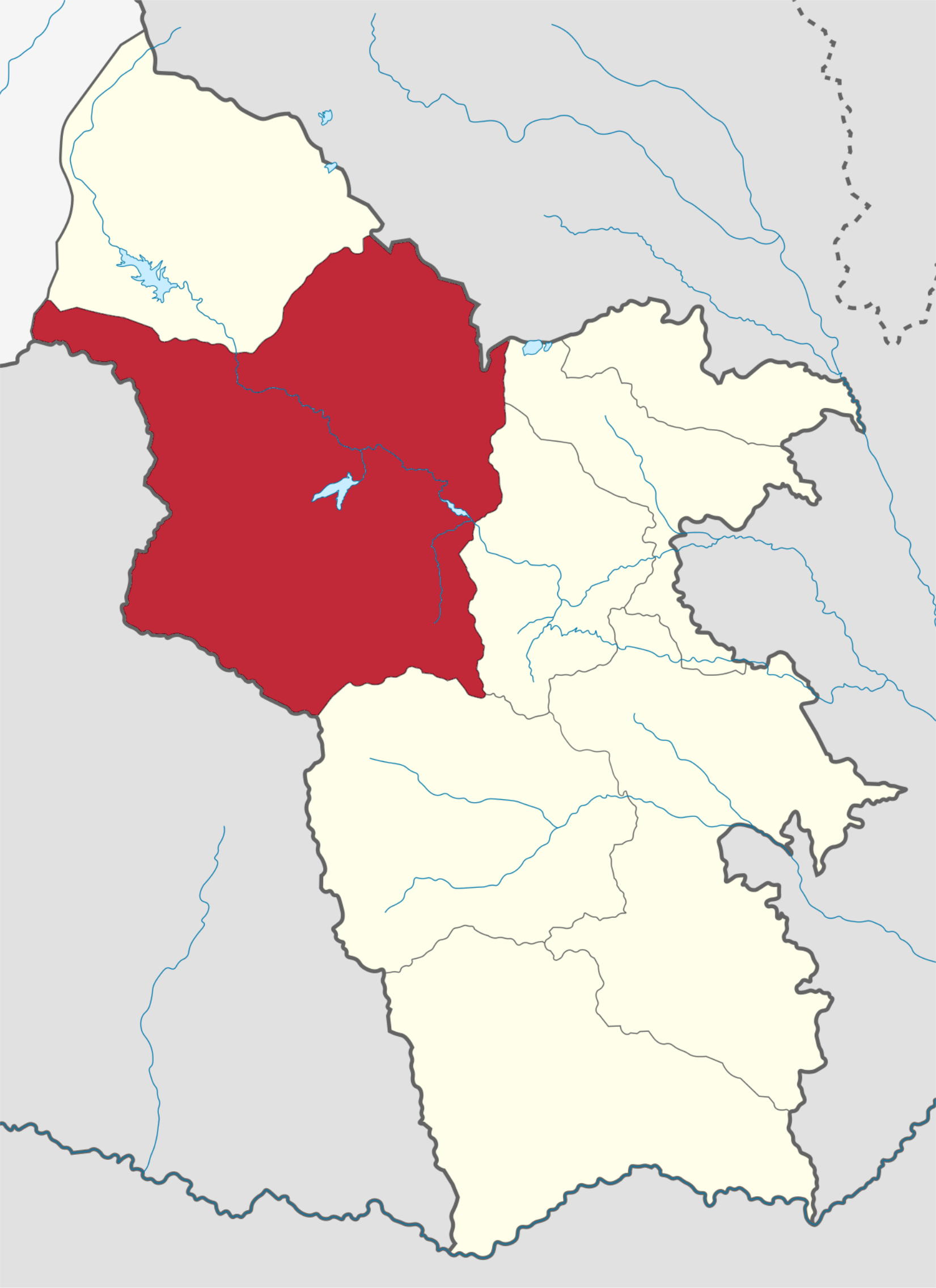
- Coordinates: 39°30′N 46°00′E
- Country: Armenia
- Province: Syunik
- Formed: 9 June 2017
- Administrative centre: Sisian

Government
  - Mayor: Armen Hakobjanyan

Population (2011 census)
  - Total: 28,563
- Time zone: AMT (UTC+04)
- Postal code: 3201–3519
- ISO 3166 code: AM-SU
- FIPS 10-4: AM08

Sisian Municipality, referred to as Sisian Community (Armenian: Սիսիան Համայնք Sisian Hamaynk), is an urban community and administrative subdivision of Syunik Province of Armenia, at the south of the country. It is a group of settlements whose administrative centre is the town of Sisian.

== Included settlements ==
Settlement	Type	Population (2011 census)
Sisian	Town, administrative centre	14,894
Aghitu	Village	436
Akhlatyan	Village	535
Angeghakot	Village	1,582
Arevis	Village	54
Ashotavan	Village	589
Balak	Village	174
Bnunis	Village	176
Brnakot	Village	1,960
Darbas	Village	556
Dastakert	Village	323
Getatagh	Village	182
Gorayk	Village	435
Hatsavan	Village	253
Ishkhanasar	Village	294
Ltsen	Village	76
Lor	Village	365
Mutsk	Village	324
Noravan	Village	485
Nzhdeh	Village	92
Shaki	Village	1,197
Salvard	Village	263
Sarnakunk	Village	474
Shaghat	Village	969
Shamb	Village	416
Shenatagh	Village	389
Spandaryan	Village	371
Tanahat	Village	7
Tasik	Village	221
Tolors	Village	332
Torunik	Village	120
Tsghuk	Village	422
Tsghuni	Village	47
Uyts	Village	396
Vaghatin	Village	593
Vorotan	Village	263

== Politics ==
Sisian Municipal Assembly (Armenian: Սիսիանի համայնքապետարան, Sisiani hamaynqapetaran) is the representative body in Sisian Municipality, consisting of 21 members which are elected every five years. The last election was held in March 2023. Armen Hakobjanyan of Civil Contract Party was elected mayor.

Party	2022	2023	Current Municipal Assembly
**Civil Contract**	**8**	**13**	
Republican Party of Armenia		**5**	
Citizen's Decision		**3**	
For The Republic Party	**2**		
Total	10	15	

Ruling coalition or party marked in bold.

== See also ==
- Syunik Province
