= Ltsen =

Ltsen Լծեն
- Location within Armenia Location within Syunik Province
- Coordinates: 39°27′00″N 46°09′36″E
- Country: Armenia
- Province: Syunik
- Municipality: Sisian

Area
  - Total: 15.96 km^{2} (6.16 sq mi)

Population (2011)
  - Total: 76
  - Density: 4.8/km^{2} (12/sq mi)
- Time zone: UTC+4 (AMT)

Ltsen (Armenian: Լծեն) is a village in the Sisian Municipality of the Syunik Province in Armenia.

== Demographics ==
The Statistical Committee of Armenia reported its population as 178 in 2010, up from 157 at the 2001 census.
