= Vorotnaberd =

Armenian fortress

Vorotnaberd Որոտանաբերդ
- Syunik Province, Armenia
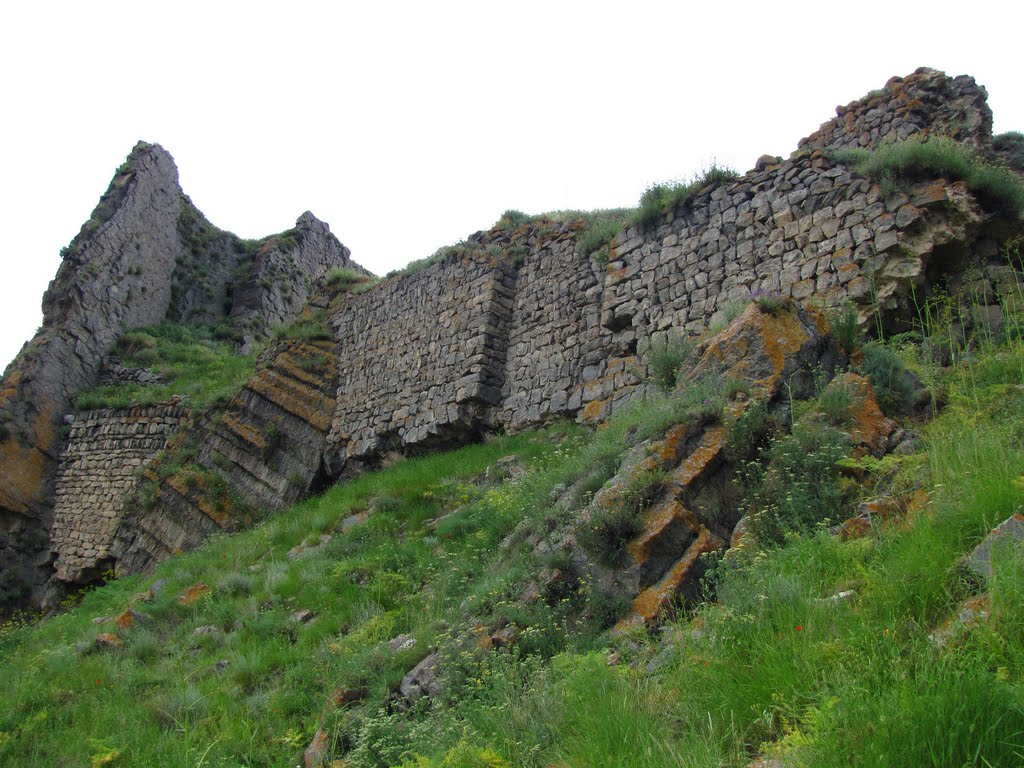
- The remains of Vorotnaberd

Site information
- Type: Fortress
- Open to the public: Yes
- Condition: Some of the fortress survives.

Location
- Shown within Armenia Vorotnaberd; Որոտանաբերդ (Syunik Province)
- Coordinates: 39.4956°N 46.1222°E

Site history
- Materials: Stone
- Demolished: Yes

Vorotnaberd (Armenian: Որոտանաբերդ; also Davit Bek's Castle) is an important fortress along a ridge overlooking the Vorotan gorge, between the villages of Vaghatin and Vorotan in the Syunik Province of Armenia. Vorotnaberd is 1,365 metres (4,478 ft) above sea level.

== History ==
Vorotnaberd was destroyed multiple times by foreign invasions. In 1104 (possibly in 1219 as well) Seljuk-Turks attacked the fortress and the nearby monastery of Vorotnavank 3 kilometres (2 mi) northwest. Ivane Zakaryan liberated the structures from enemy hands and gave control of Vorotnavank and Vorotnaberd to Liparit Orbelian of the Orbelyan family. Repairs were made to the nearby monastery during this time to make it functional once again.

Other foreign invasions included the Mongol-Tatars (in 1236?) and later Timur Lenk in 1386 where his army lay siege to the fortress. An underground passageway connected to Vorotnavank and the Vorotan River was used during sieges by invading armies.

In 1724 Davit Bek took control of Vorotnaberd from Melik Baghri. This incident led people living in the region to call the fortress by the name "Davit Bek's Castle".

== Architecture ==
The fortress is in ruin.

== Gallery ==
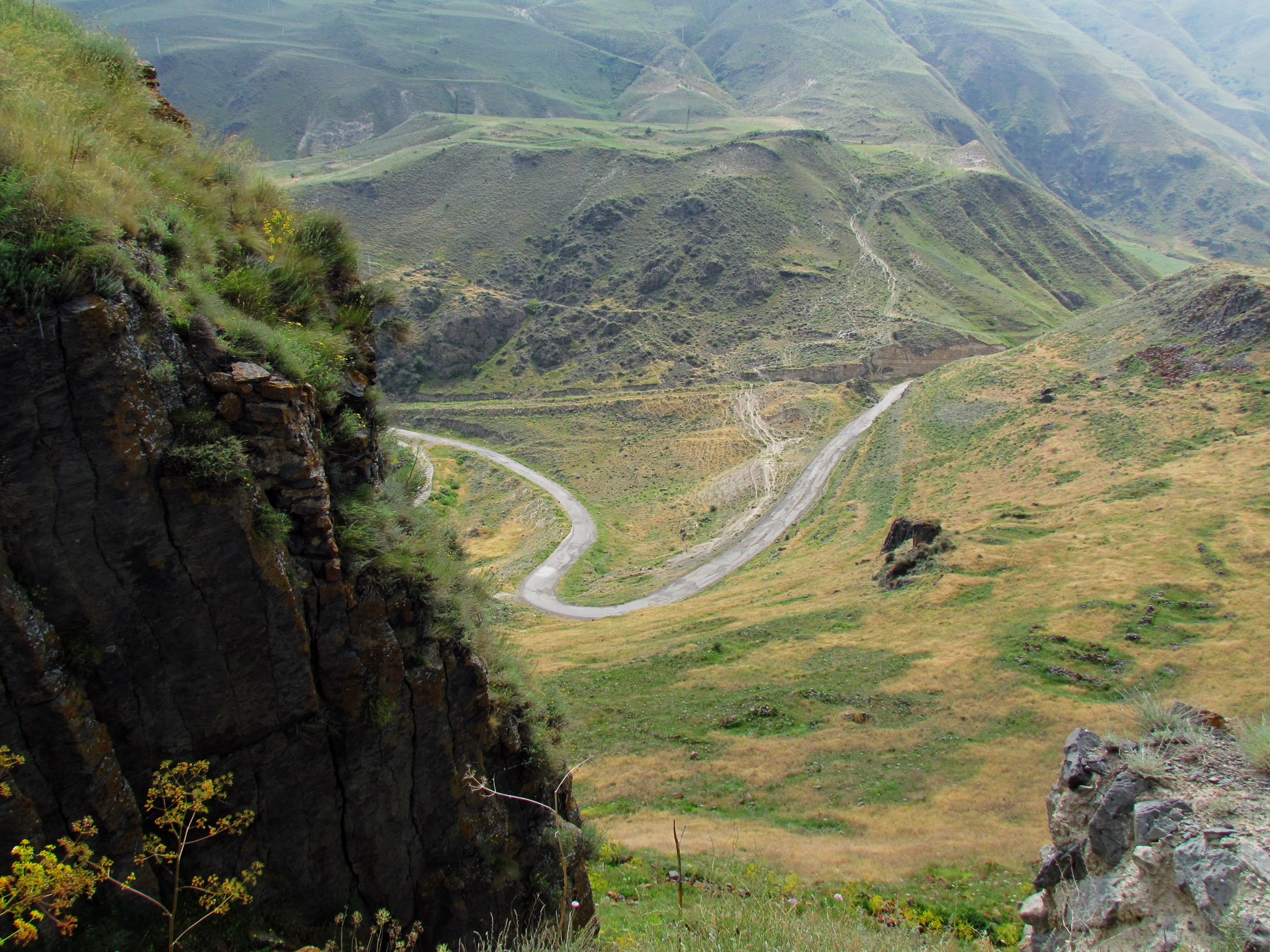

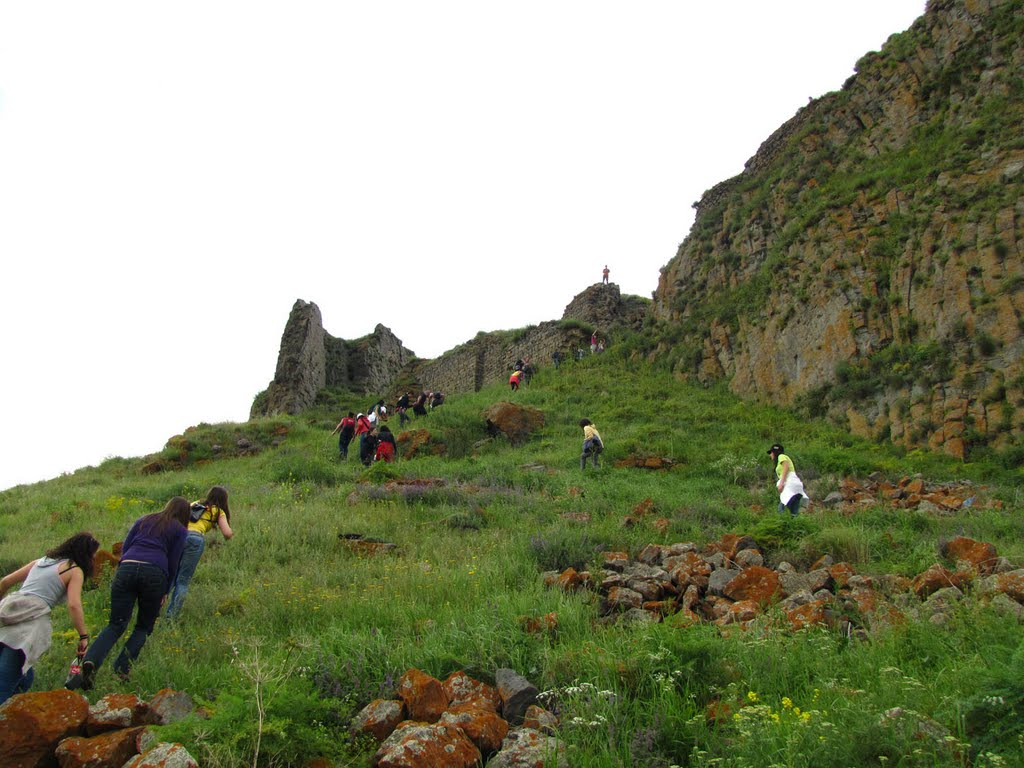

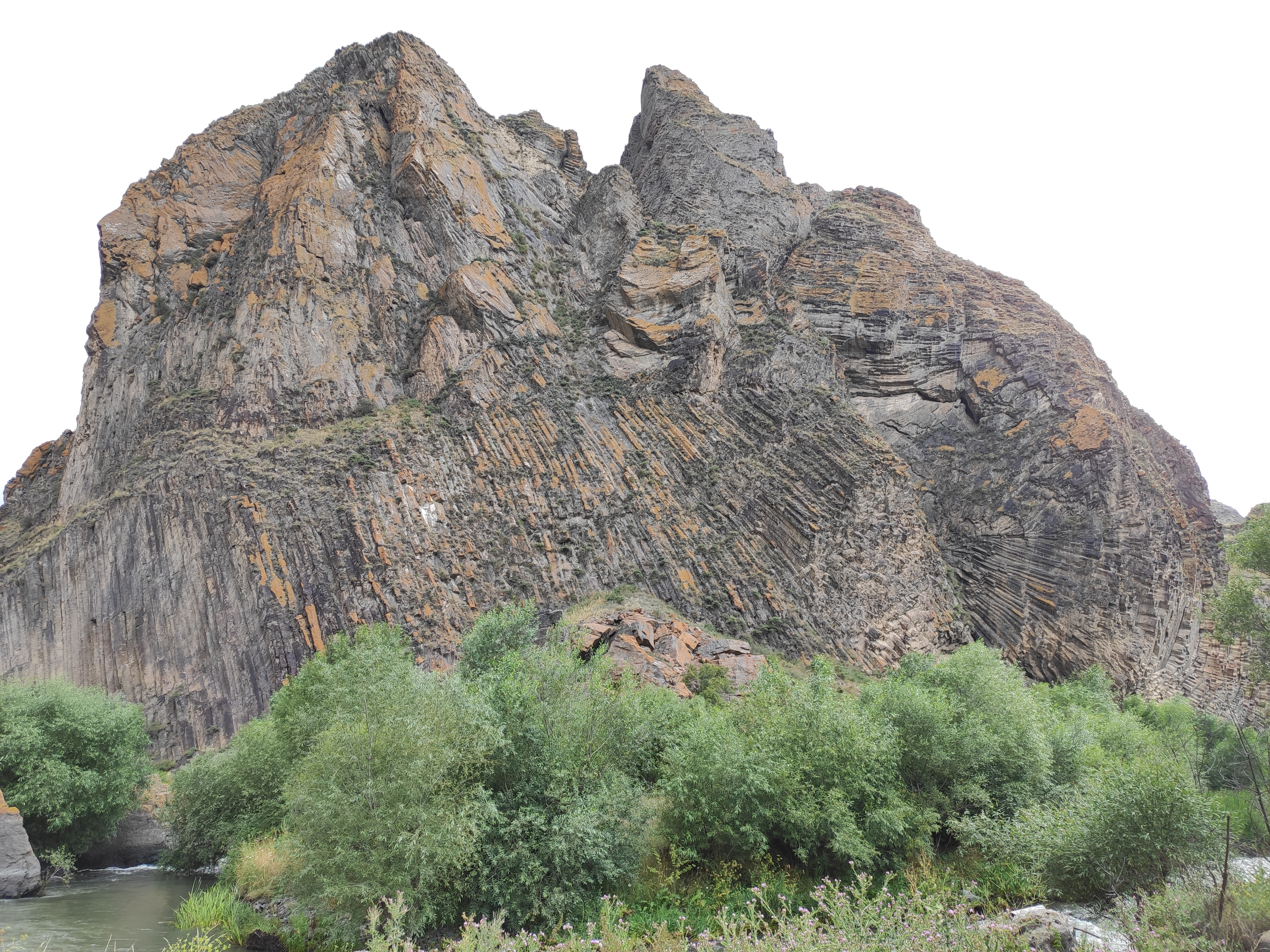

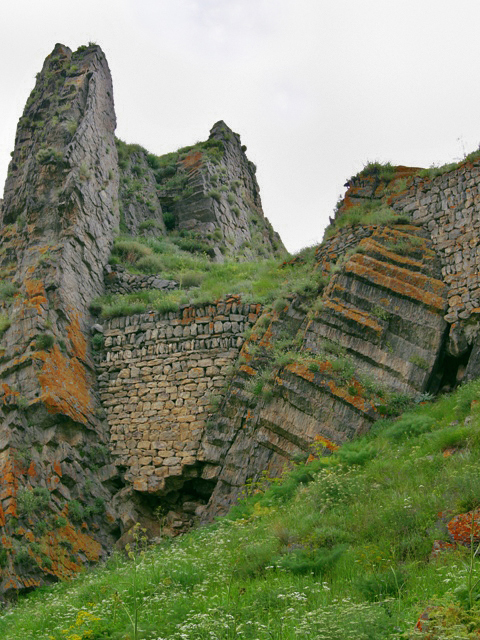

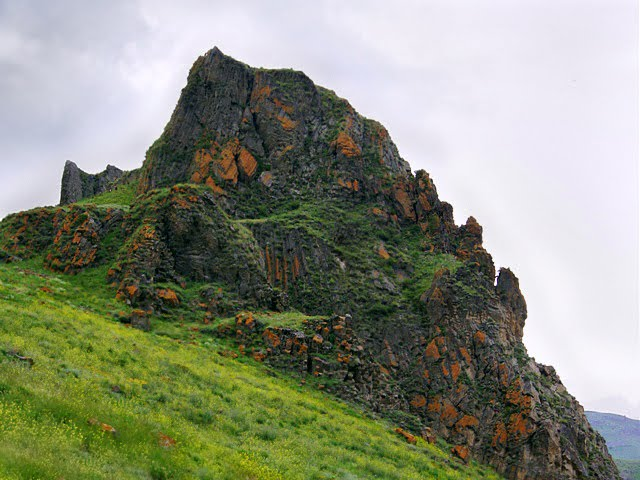

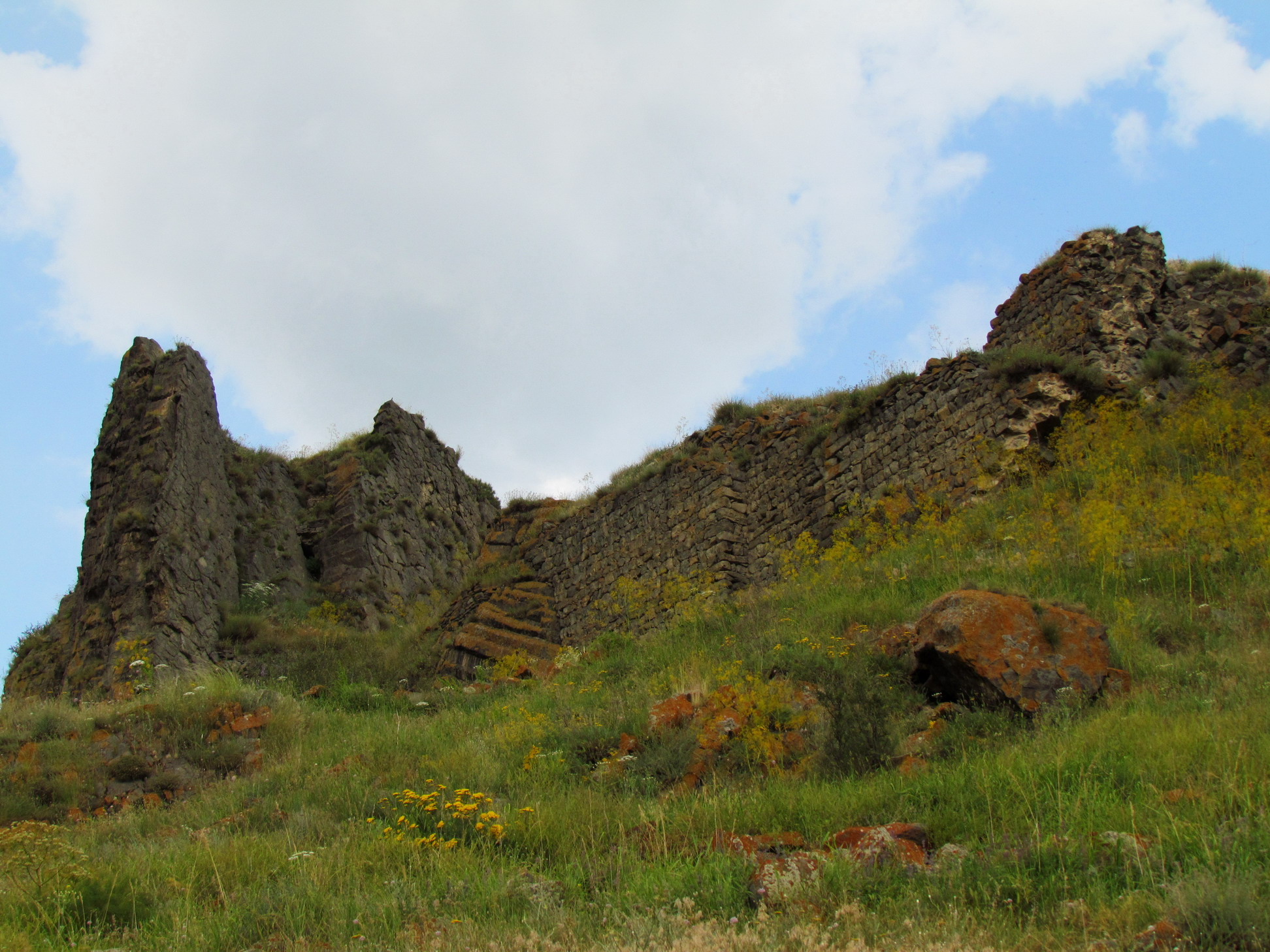

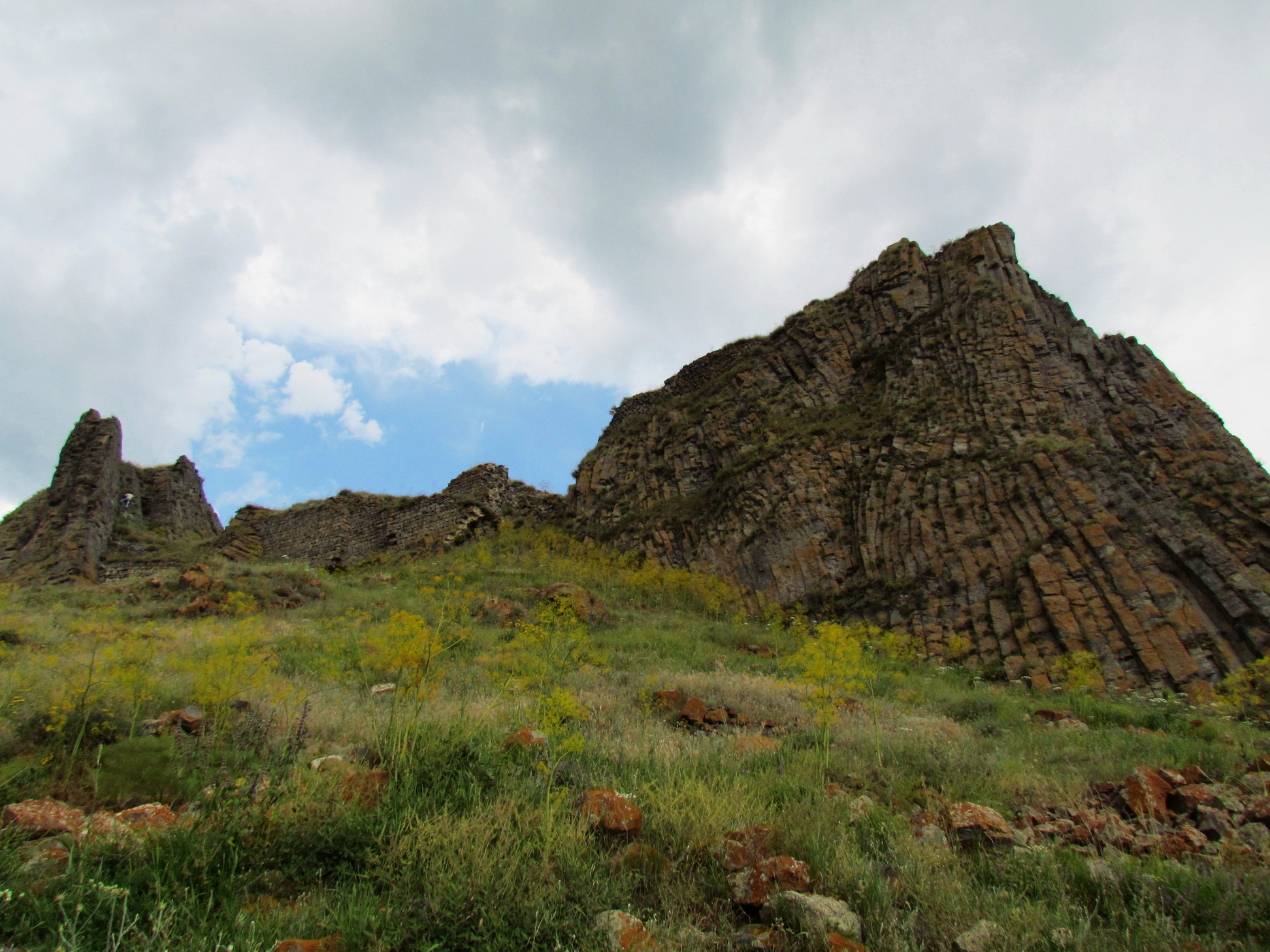
