= Vorotnavank =

Historic site of Armenia

Vorotnavank Որոտնավանք
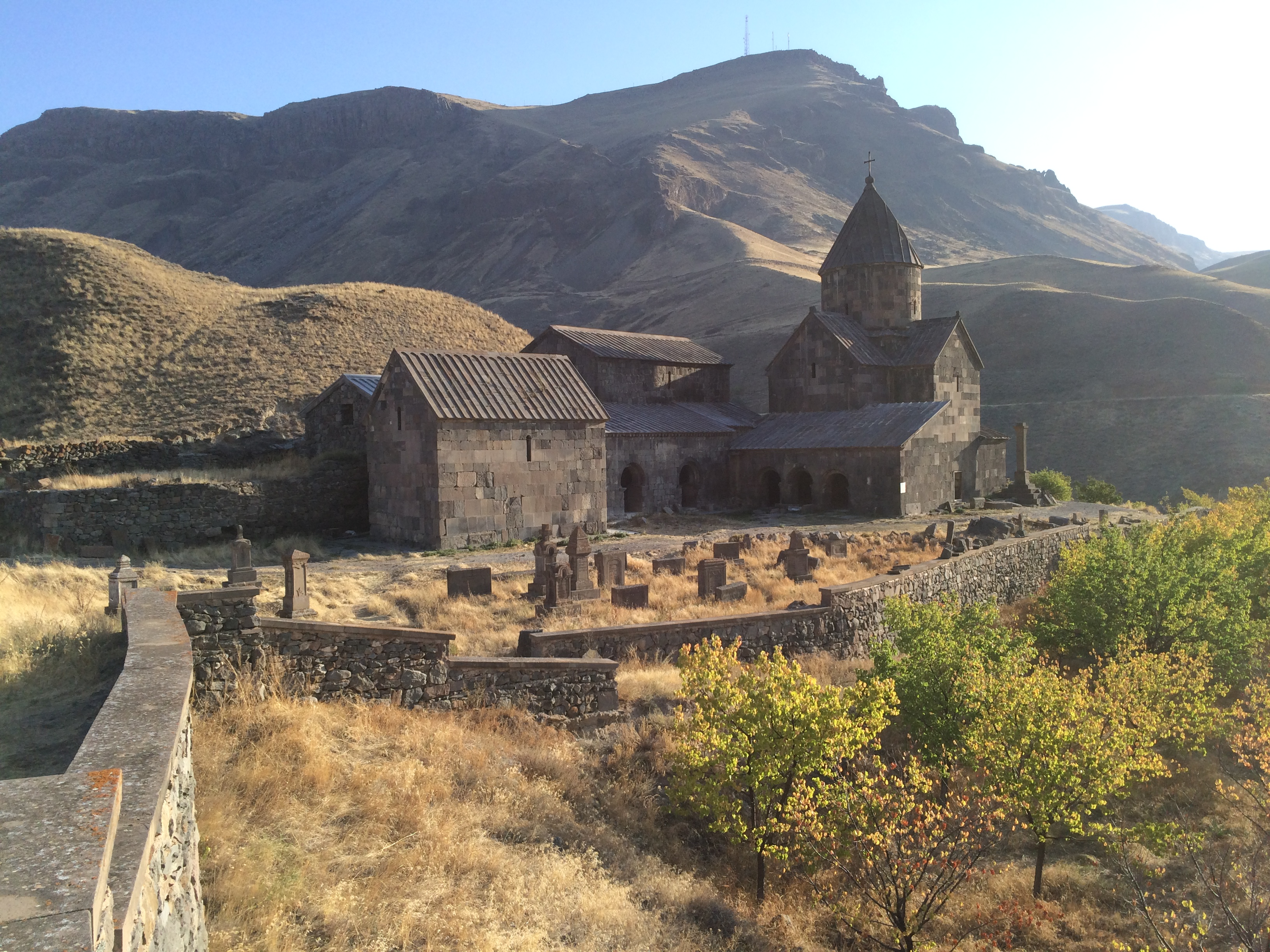
- The monastic complex of Vorotnavank.

- Location within Armenia Location within Syunik Province

Religion
- Affiliation: Armenian Apostolic Church

Location
- Location: On a promontory overlooking the Vorotan gorge, between the villages of Vaghatin and Vorotan, Syunik Province, Armenia
- Coordinates: 39.4956°N 46.1222°E

Architecture
- Style: Armenian
- Completed: In use from the 10th-15th centuries S. Stepanos c. 1000; S. Karapet c. 1007
- Dome: 1 (rebuilt after its collapse in the 1931 earthquake)

Vorotnavank (Armenian: Որոտնավանք) is a monastic complex located along a ridge overlooking the Vorotan gorge, between the villages of Vaghatin and Vorotan, about 14 km east of Sisian in the Syunik Province of Armenia. The complex is surrounded by a high stone wall for defense against foreign invasions and once housed workshops, stores, a seminary, resort, cemetery and an alms-house. A pillar stood in the yard of the monastery symbolizing that there were monks entering into religious service and kings inaugurated at this location. Hovhan Vorotnetsi (1315-1398), an Armenian medieval philosopher and theologian as well as the founder of Tatev Vardapetaran University lived and worked at the monastery.

== Architecture ==
=== Surp Stepanos Church ===
The main church of Surp Stepanos was built in 1000 by Queen Shahandukht, ruler of the lands of Syunik. Prior to the construction of the church stood a shrine to Saint Grigor Lusavorich. Four sacristies were placed at the southeastern end of S. Stepanos.

=== Surp Karapet Church ===
The adjoining church of Surp Karapet was constructed in 1006-1007 by Queen Shahandukht's son Sevada. The structure has a triple-arched portico at the front façade. A circular drum and a recently reconstructed dome rest above the cruciform plan of the church.

== Destruction ==
Vorotnavank was destroyed multiple times by foreign invasions as well as an earthquake in 1931 during which S. Karapet's dome collapsed. In 1104 Seljuk-Turks attacked the monastery and the nearby fortress of Vorotnaberd (3 km southeast). Ivane Zakaryan liberated them and gave control of Vorotnavank and Vorotnaberd to Liparit Orbelian of the Orbelyan family. The monastery was repaired and made funcionable during this time. Other foreign invasions included the Mongol-Tatars (1236?) and later Timur Lenk in 1386. An underground passageway was connected to the fortress of Vorotnaberd, and was used during sieges by invading armies. Reconstruction efforts have been underway since 1980 and are nearly complete.

== Gallery ==
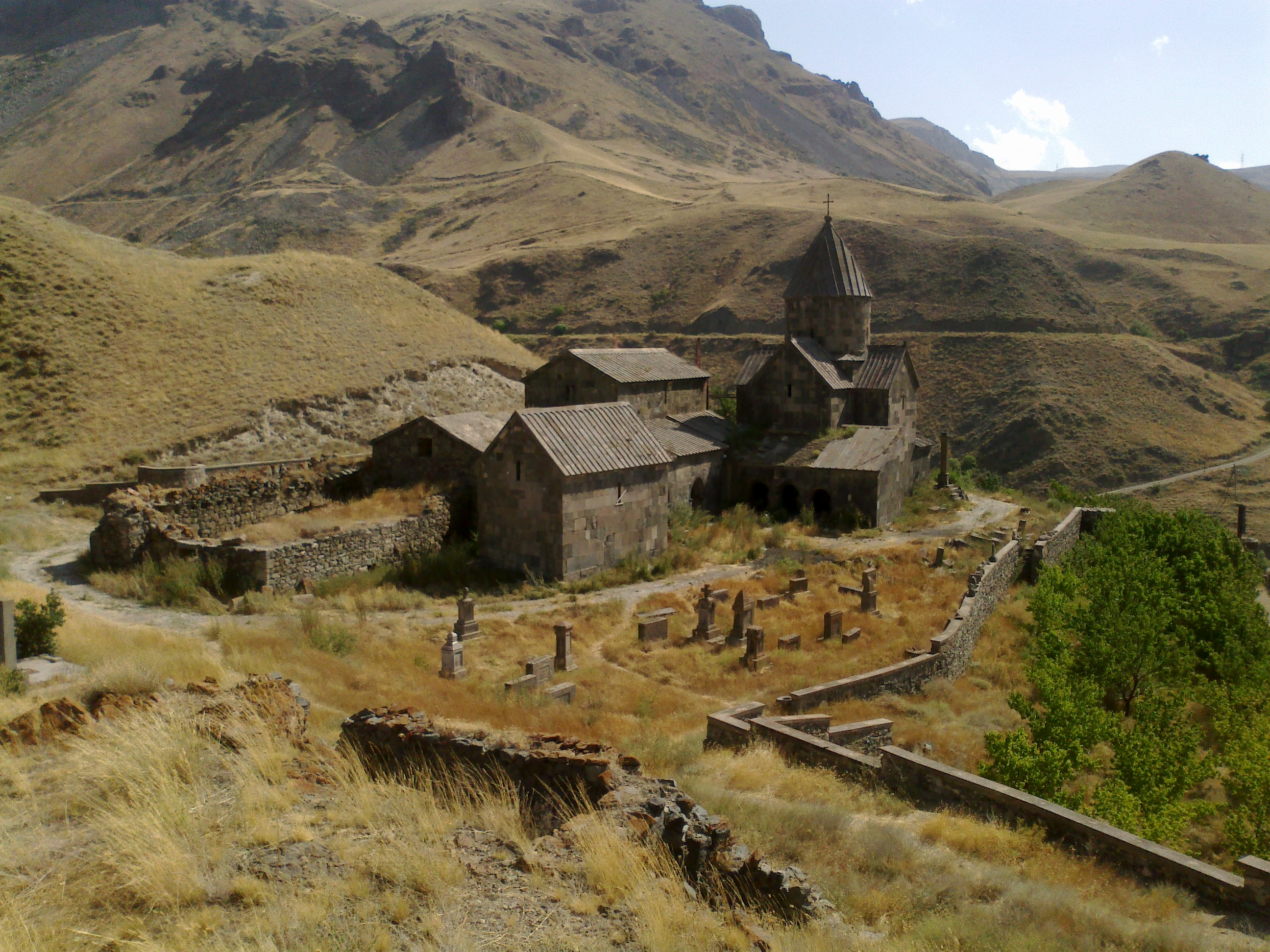

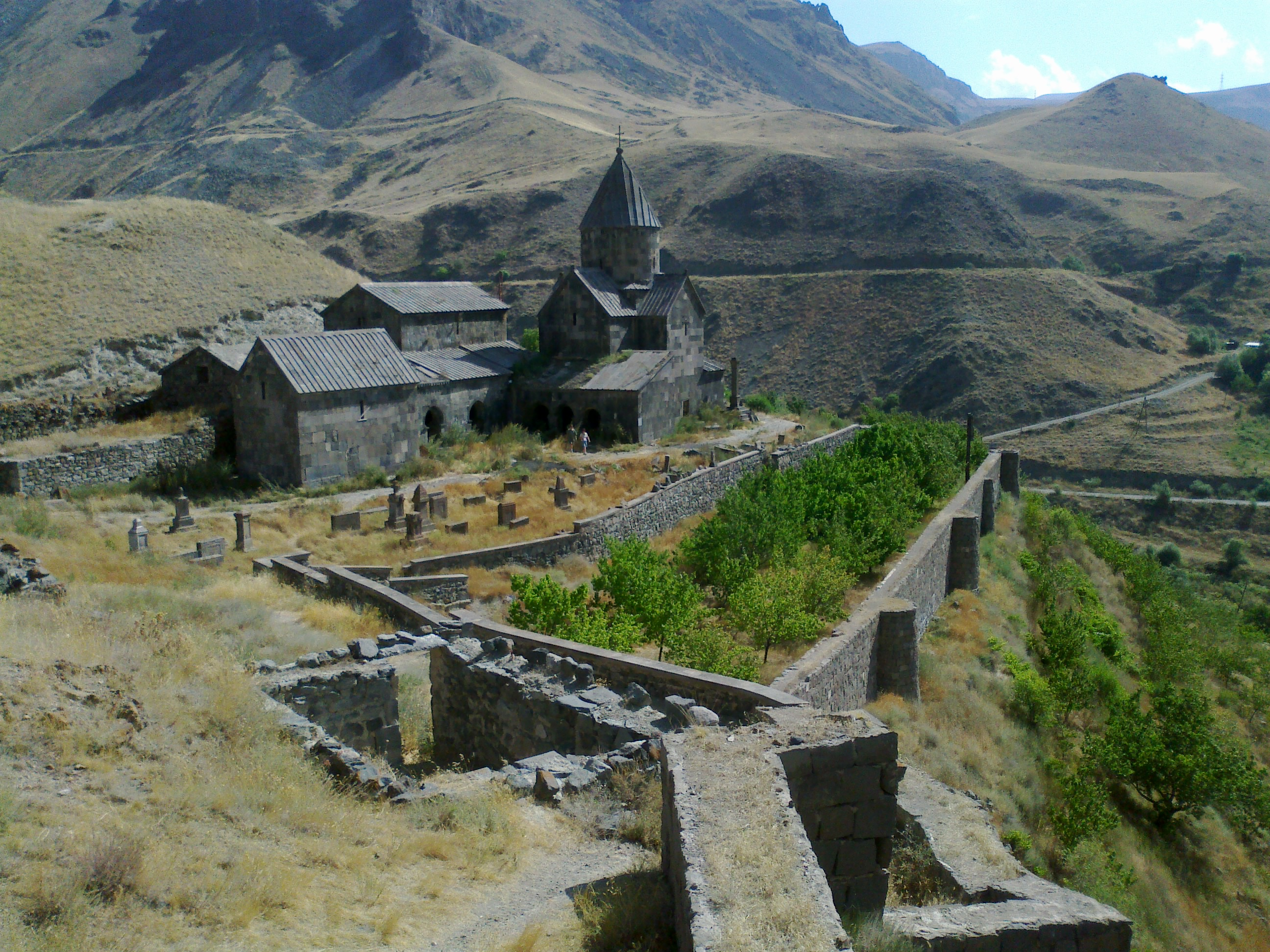

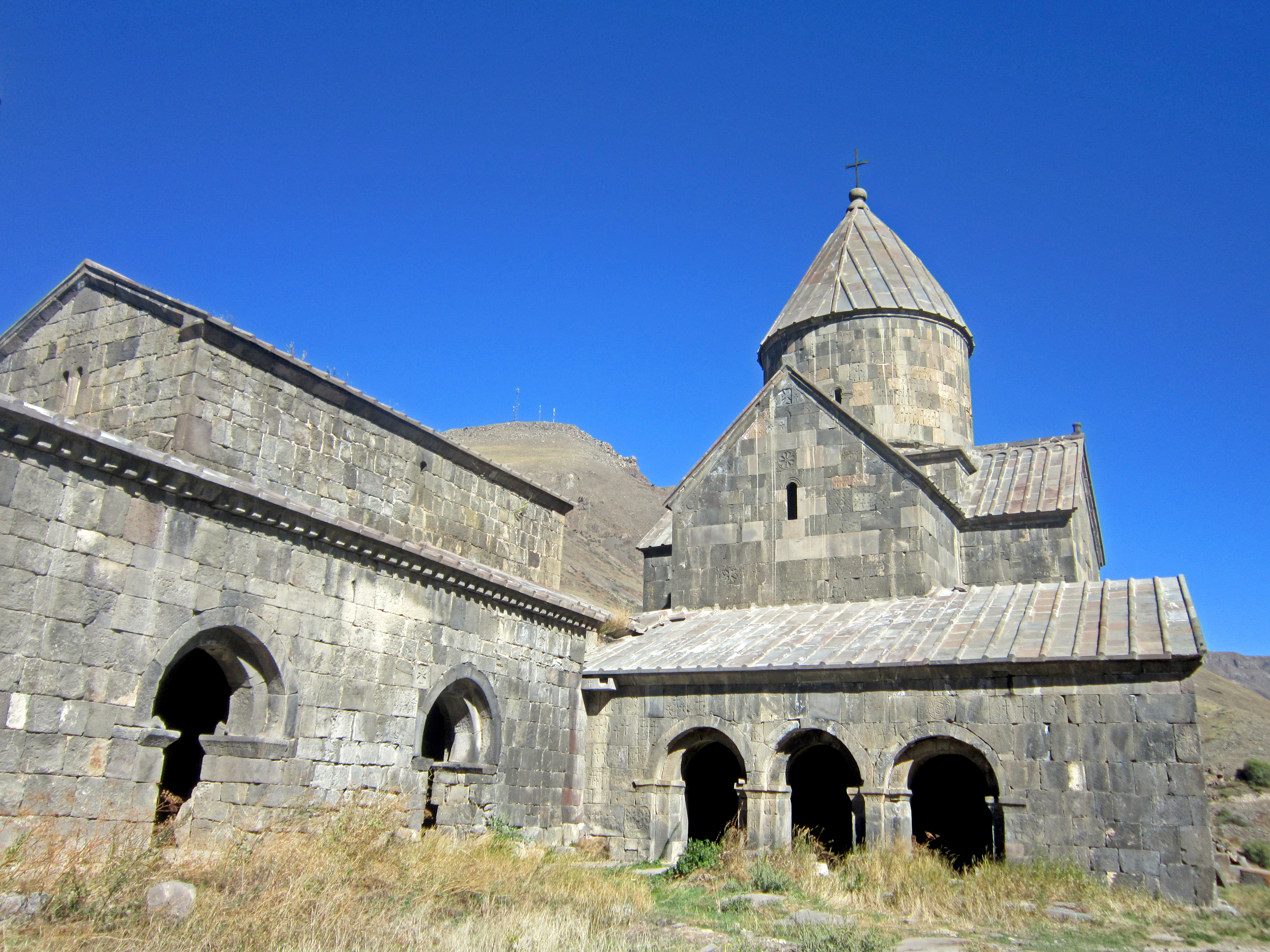

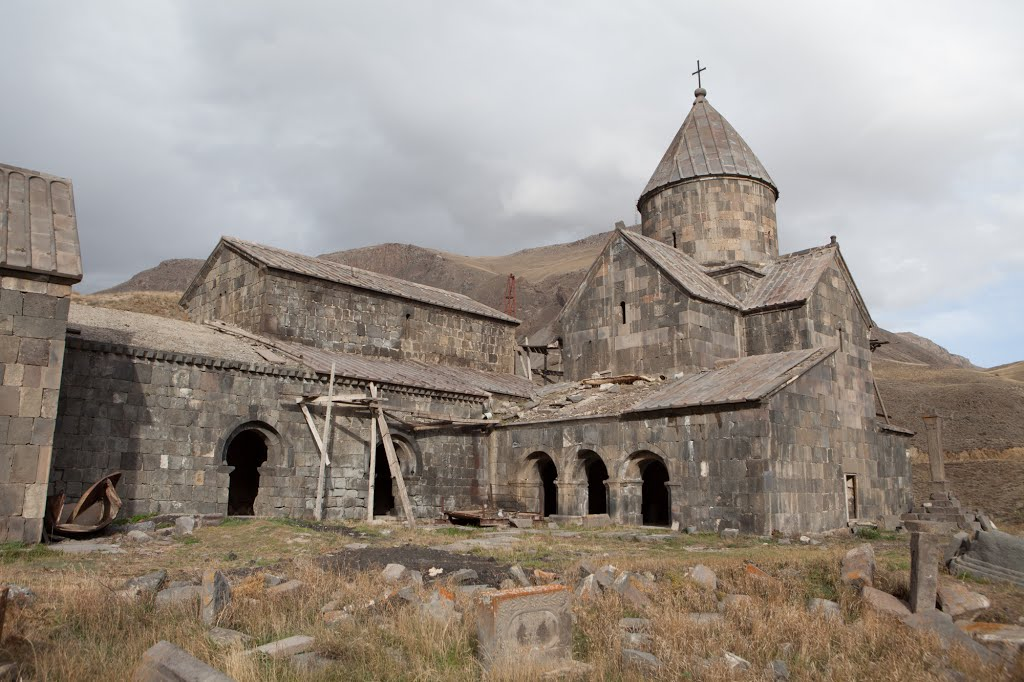

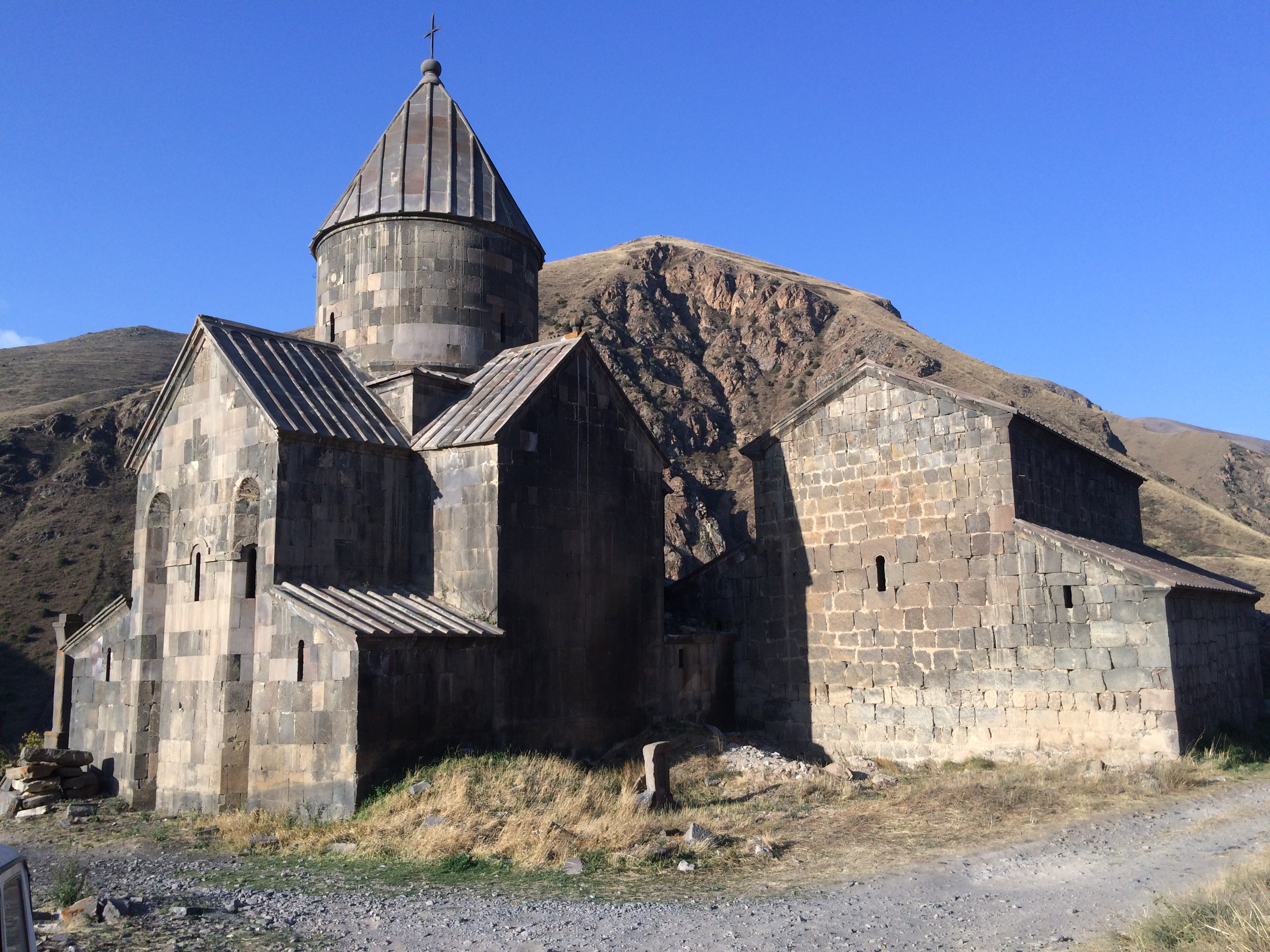

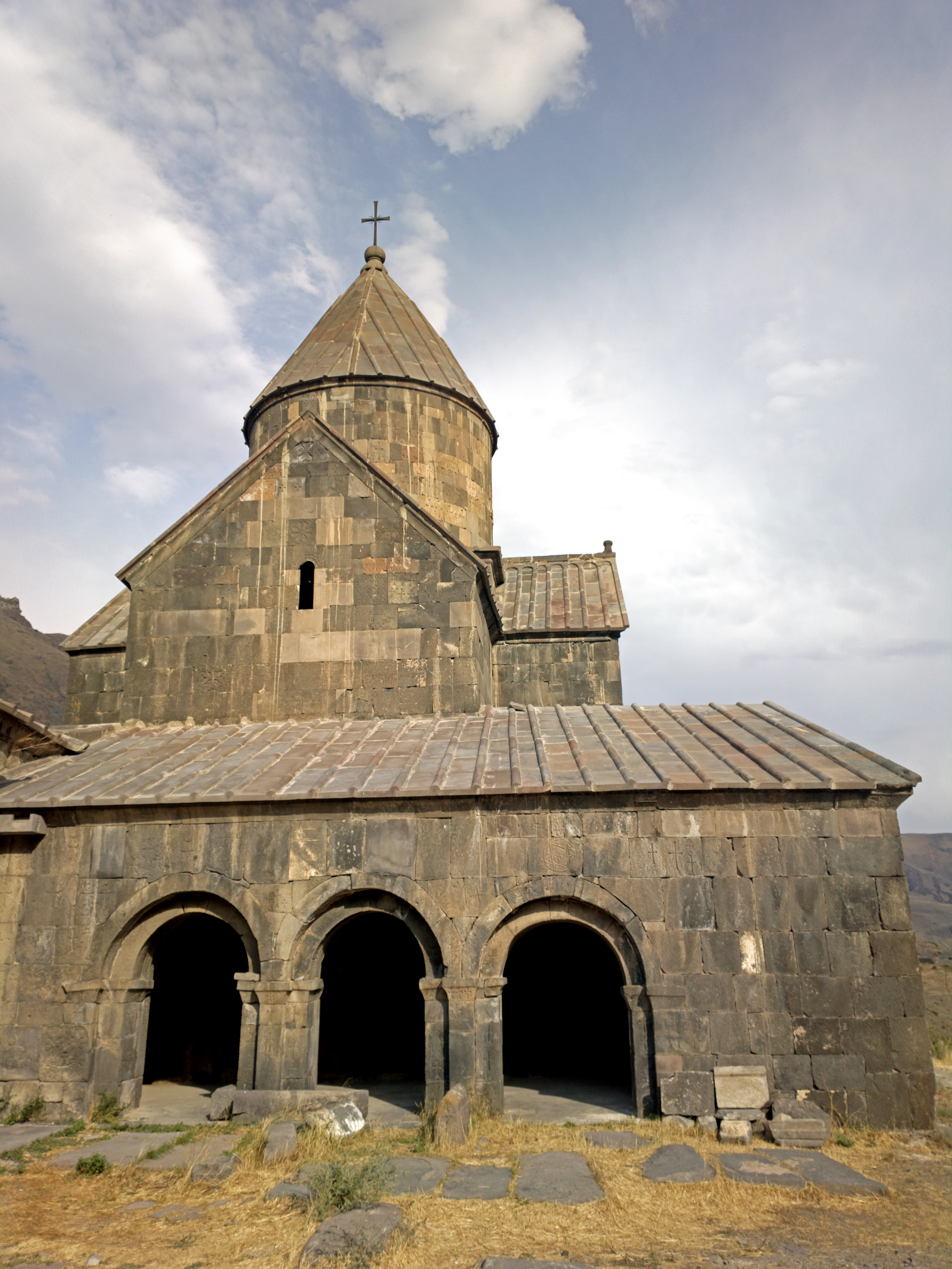

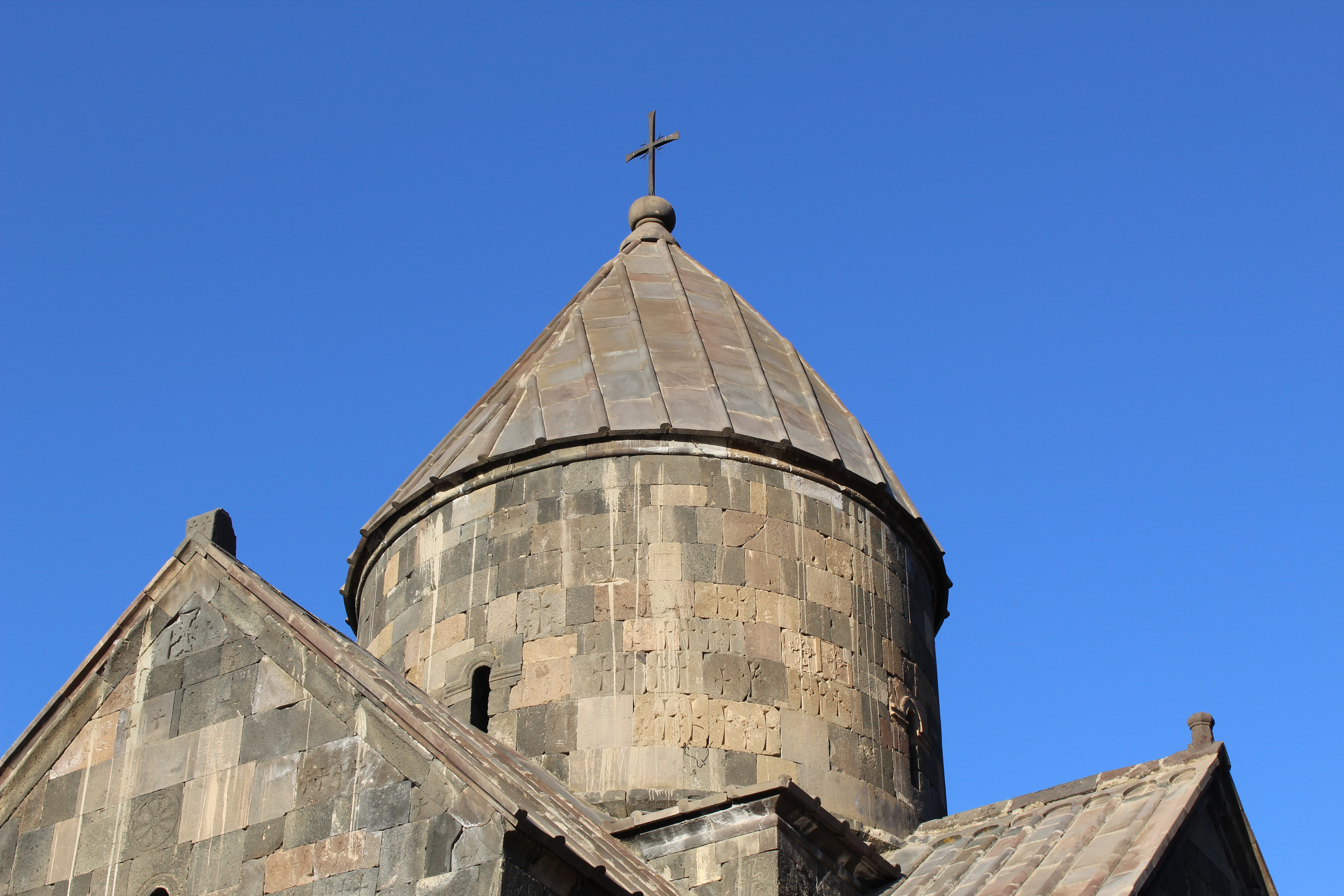

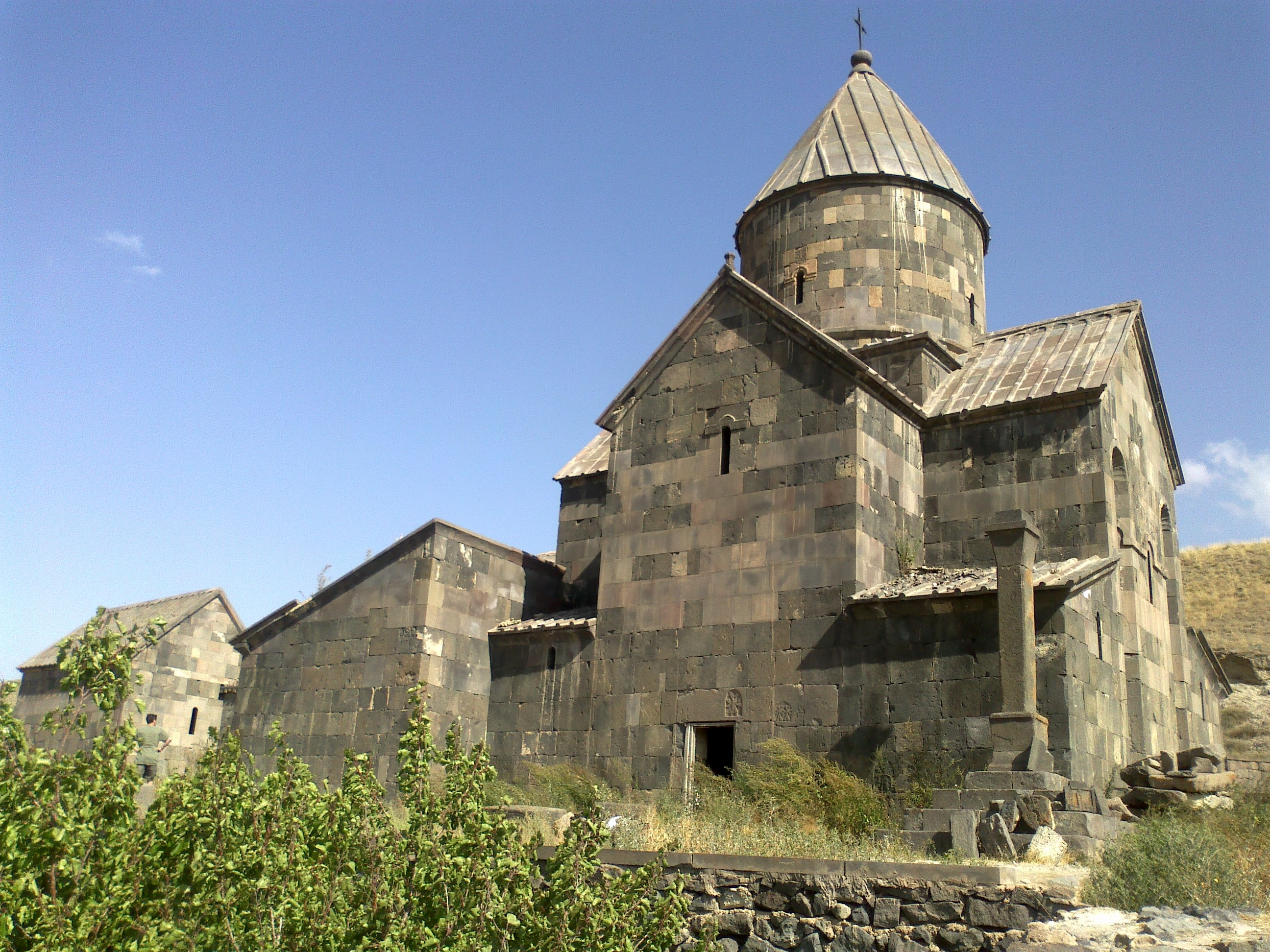

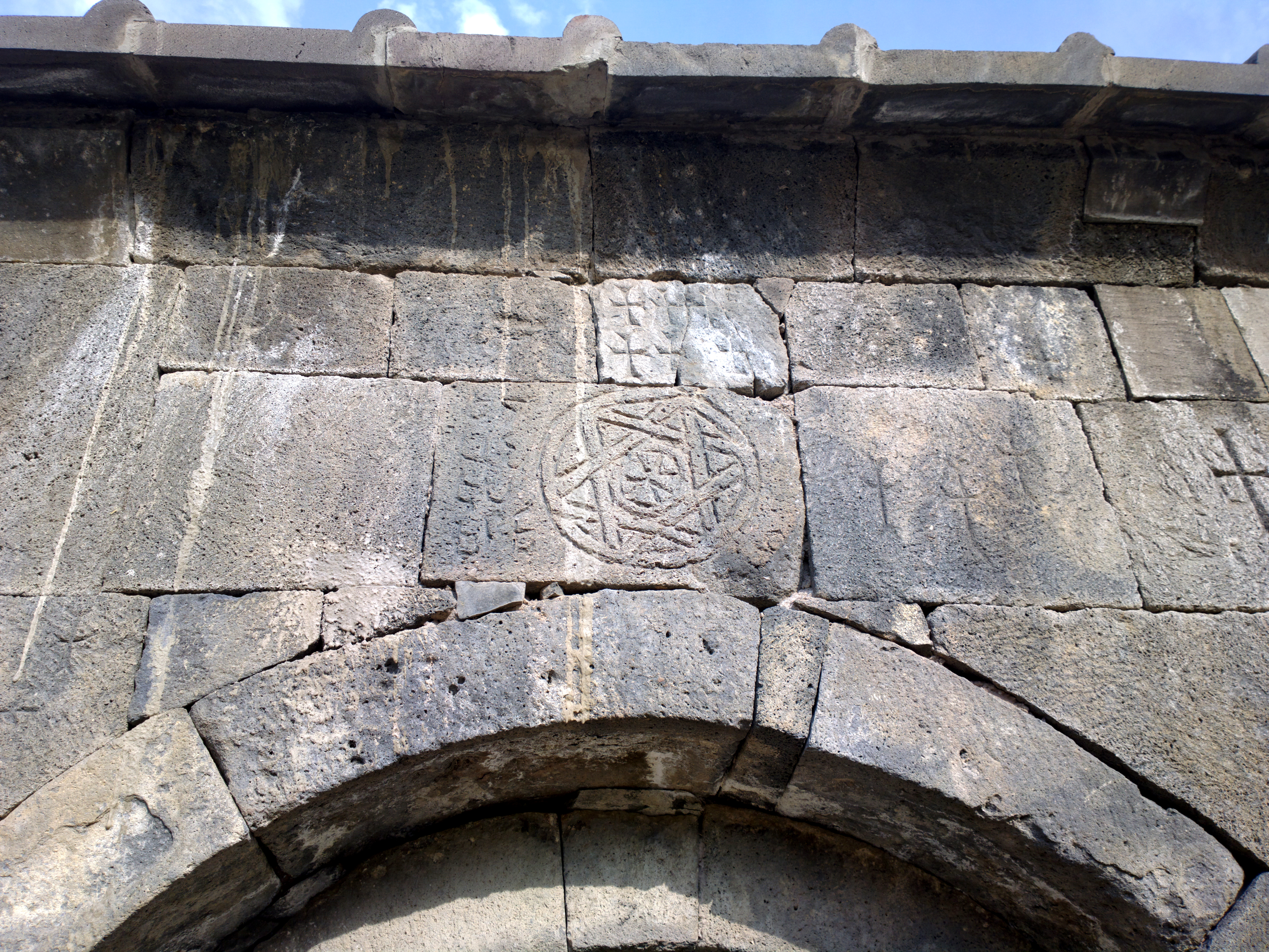

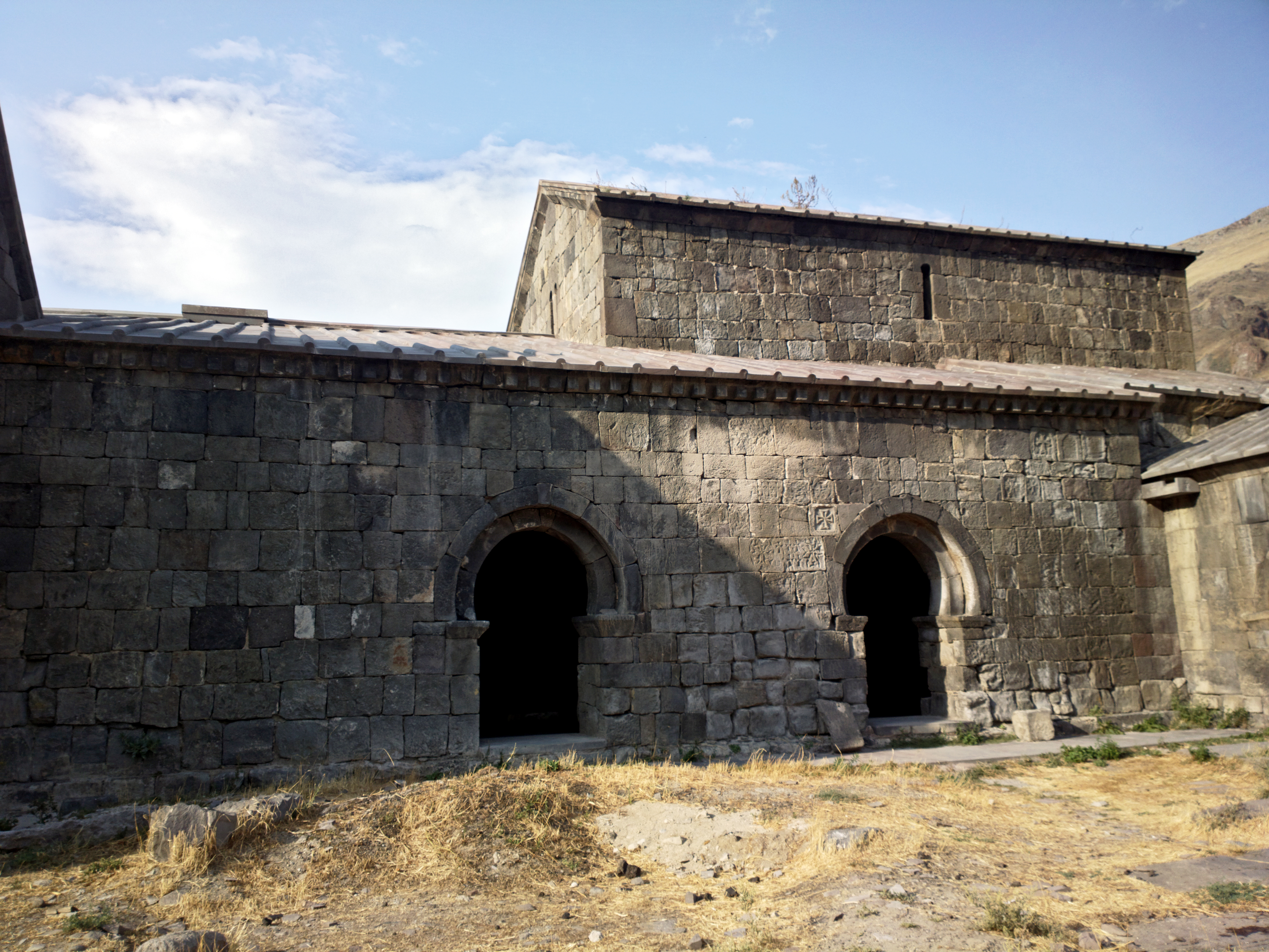

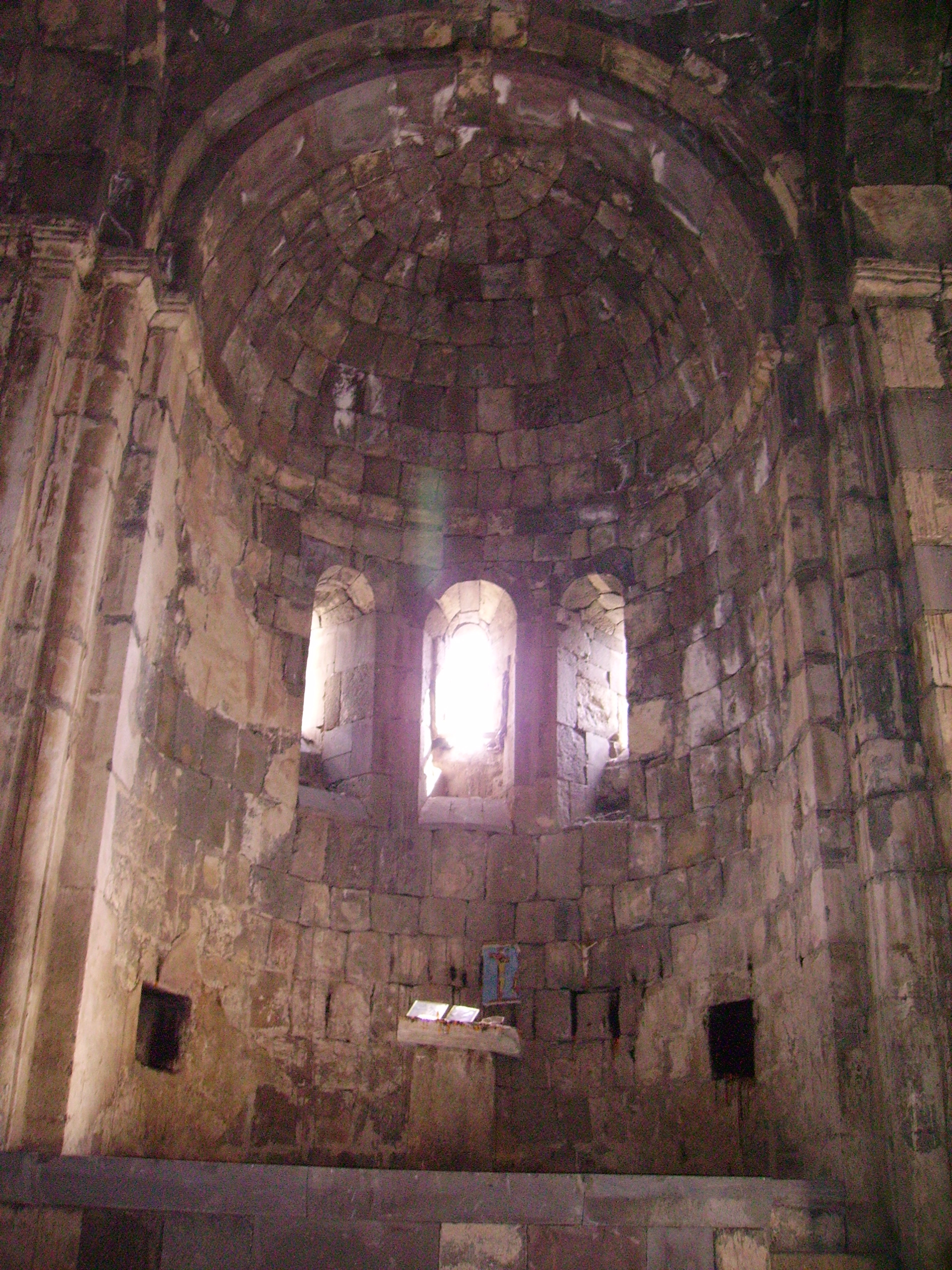
Interior of the apse at Vorotnavank.

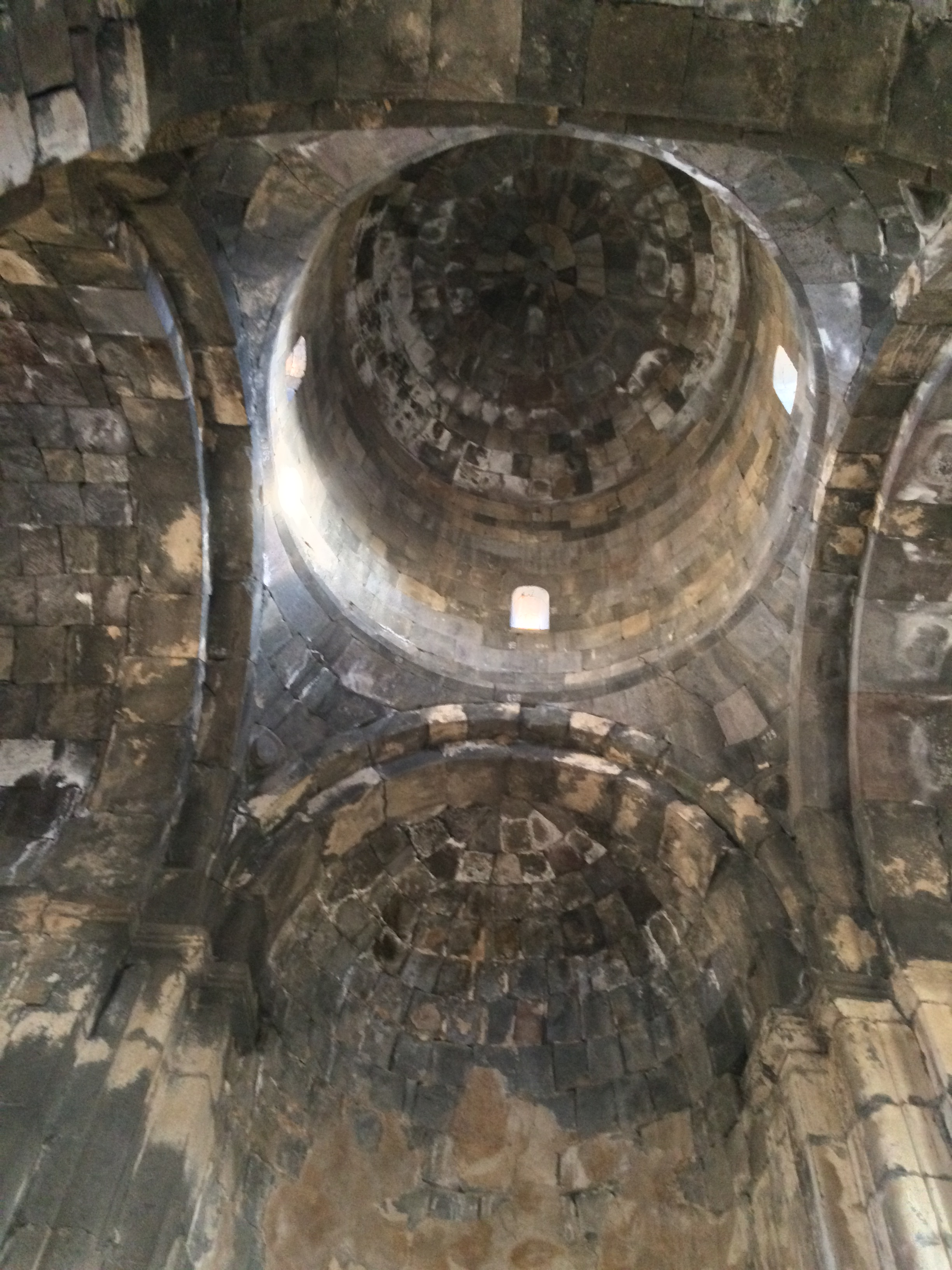

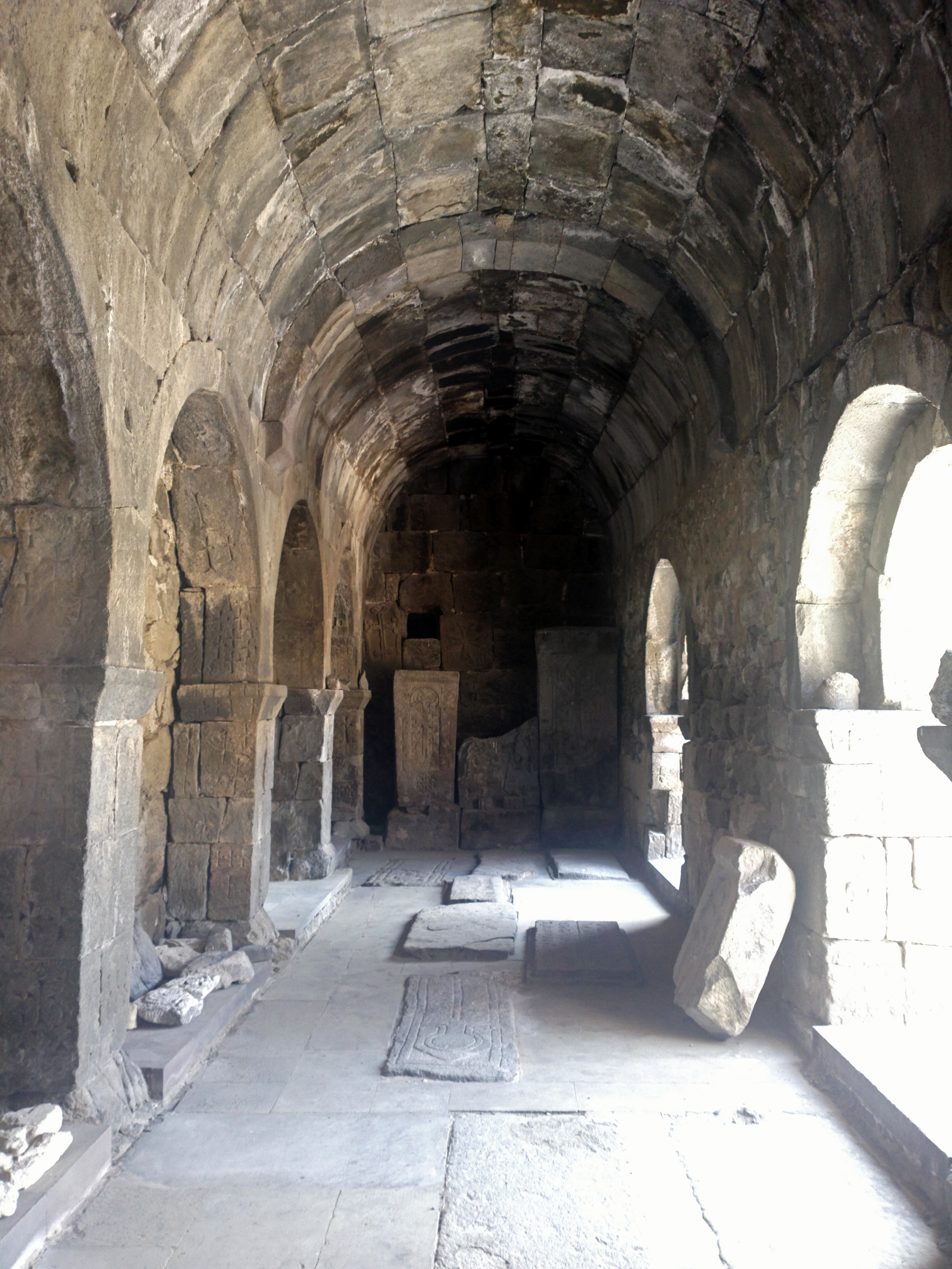

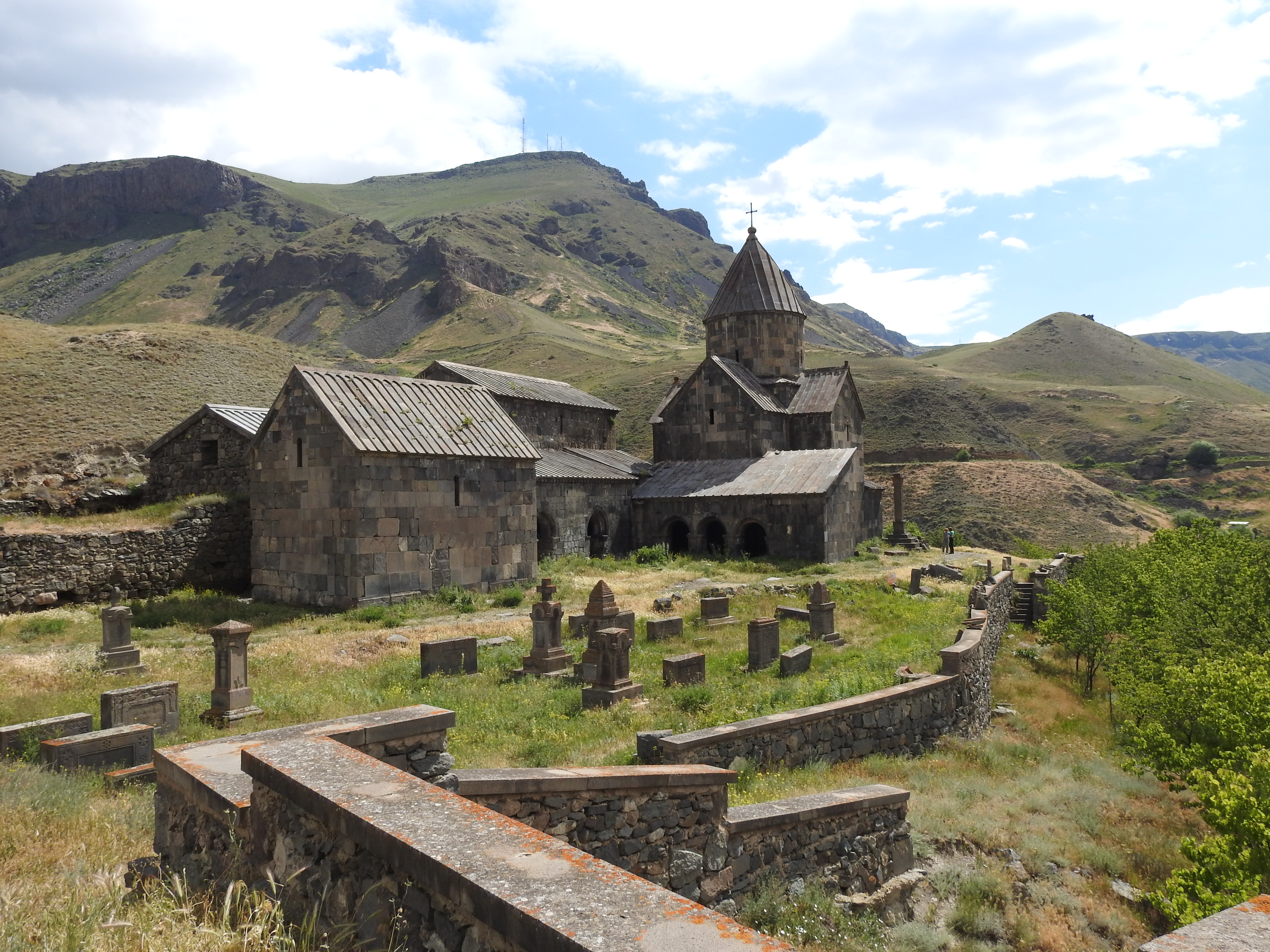
Vorotnavank with monastery wall, monastery garden and old cemetery

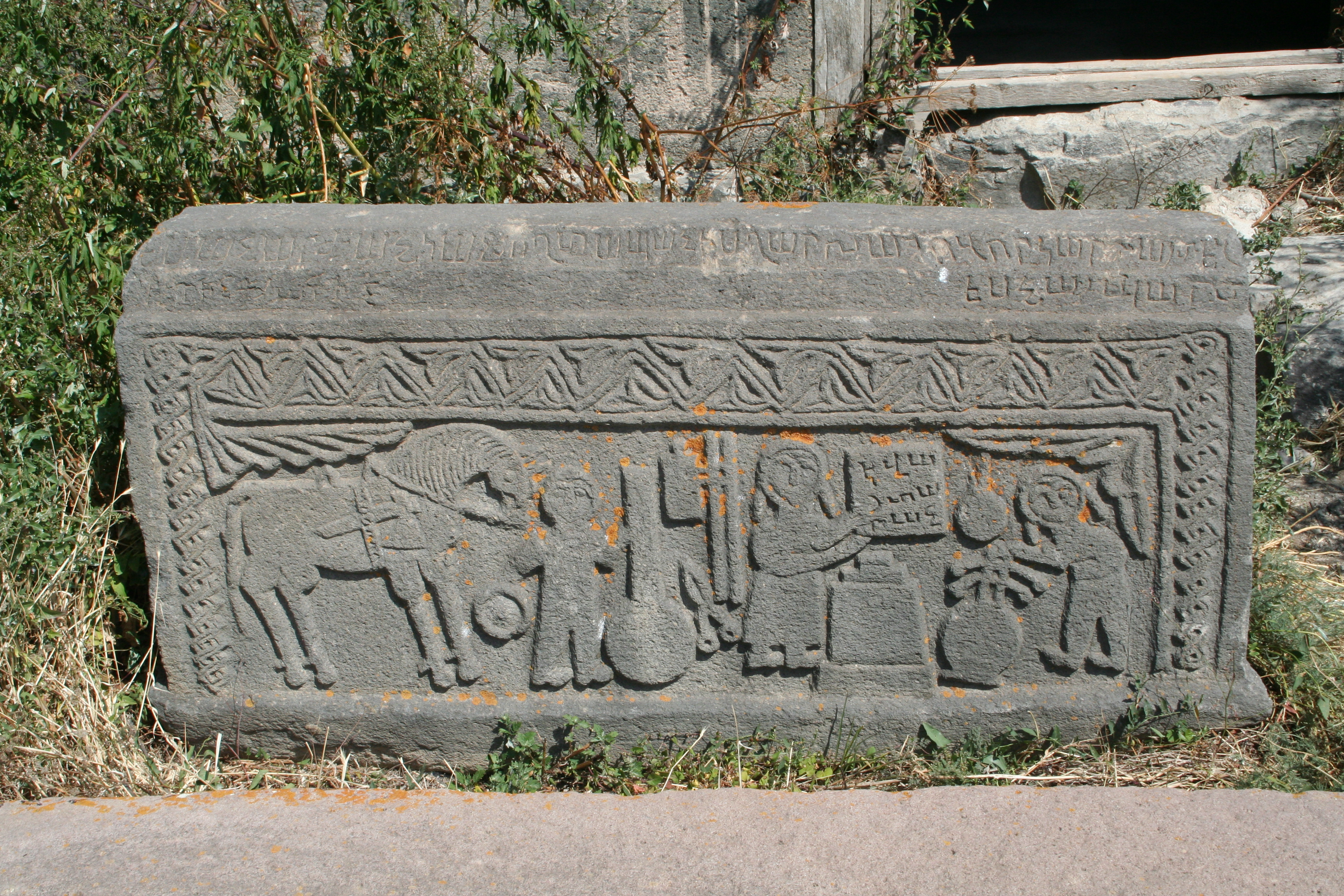

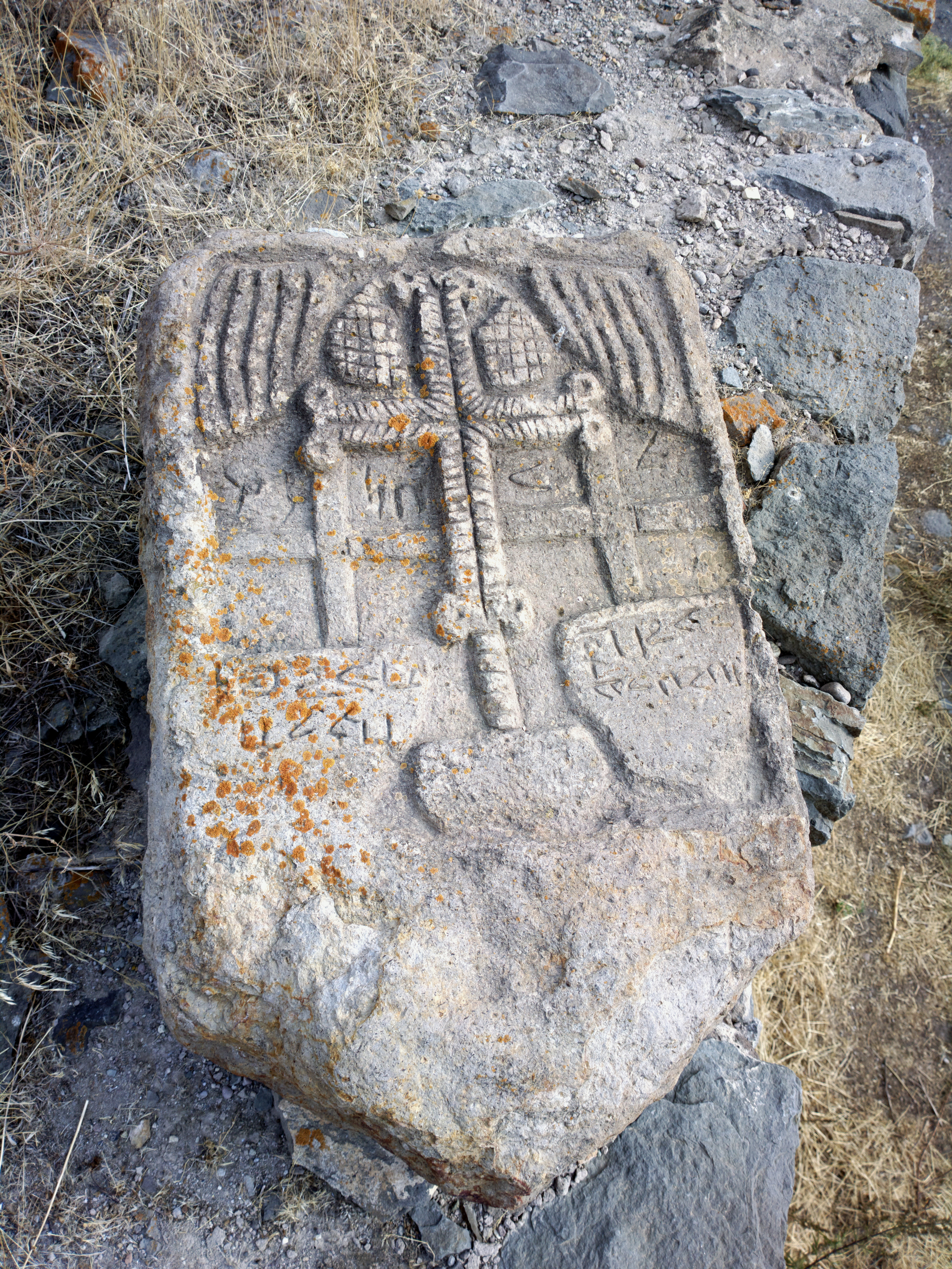

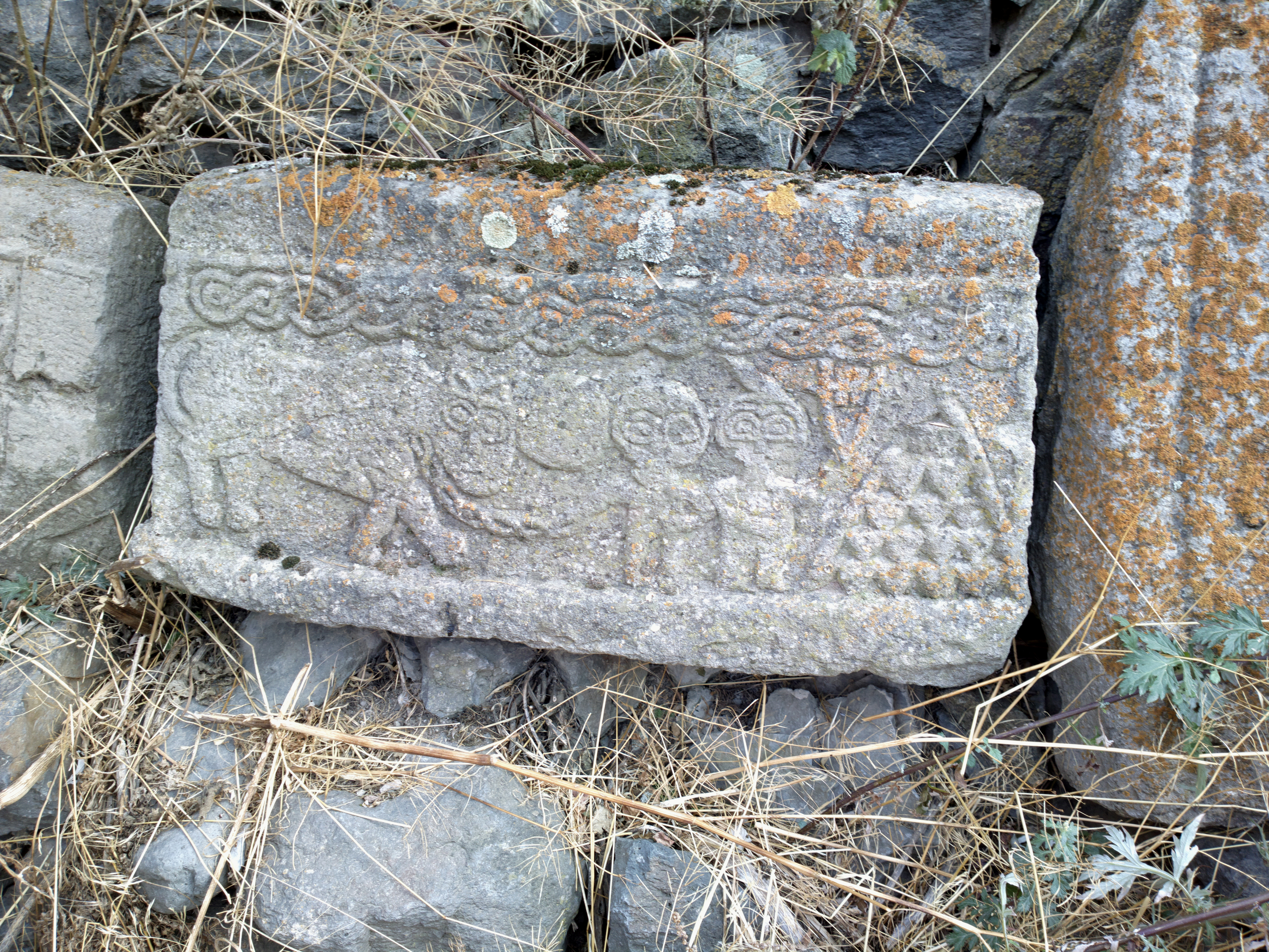

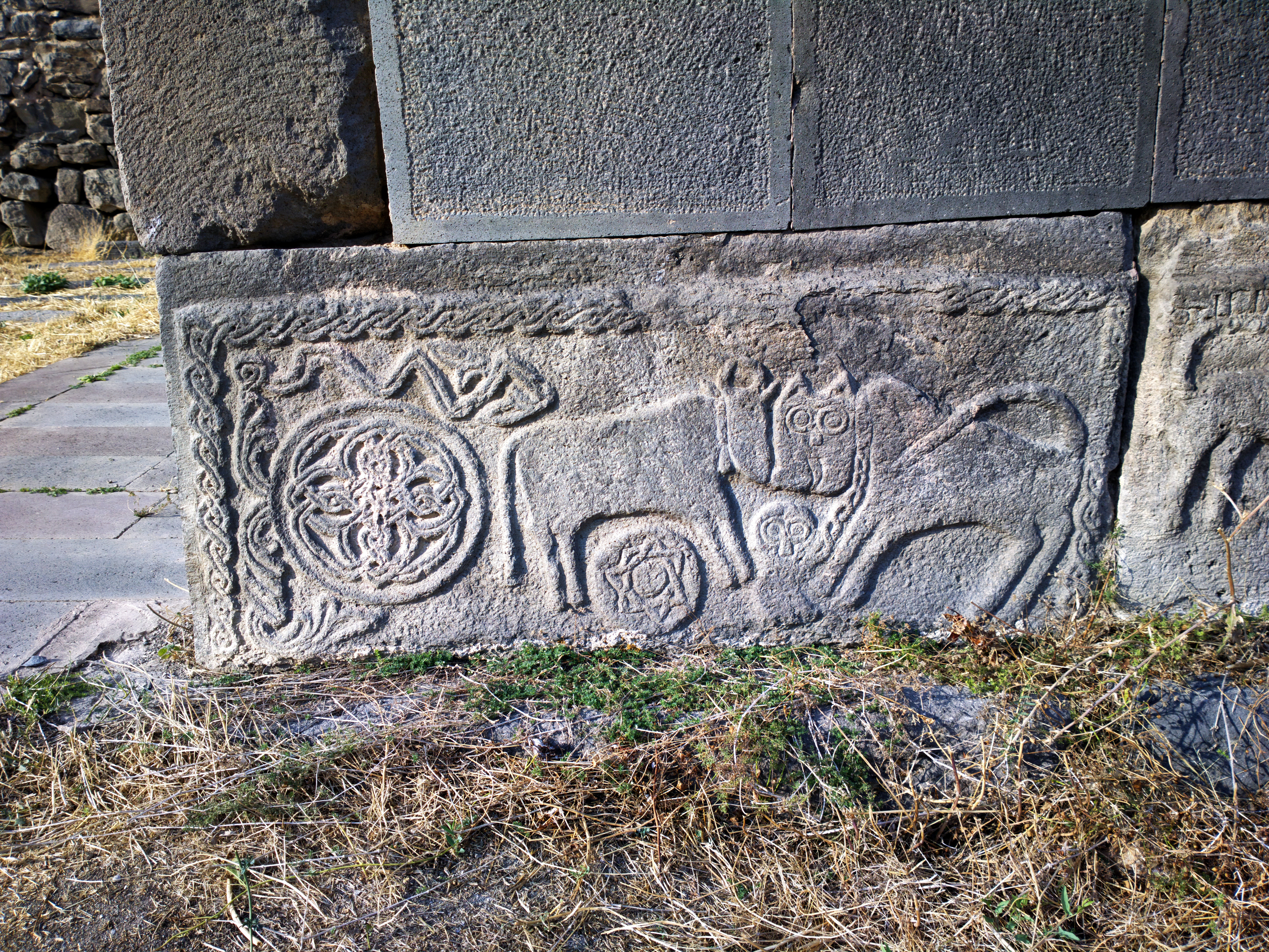

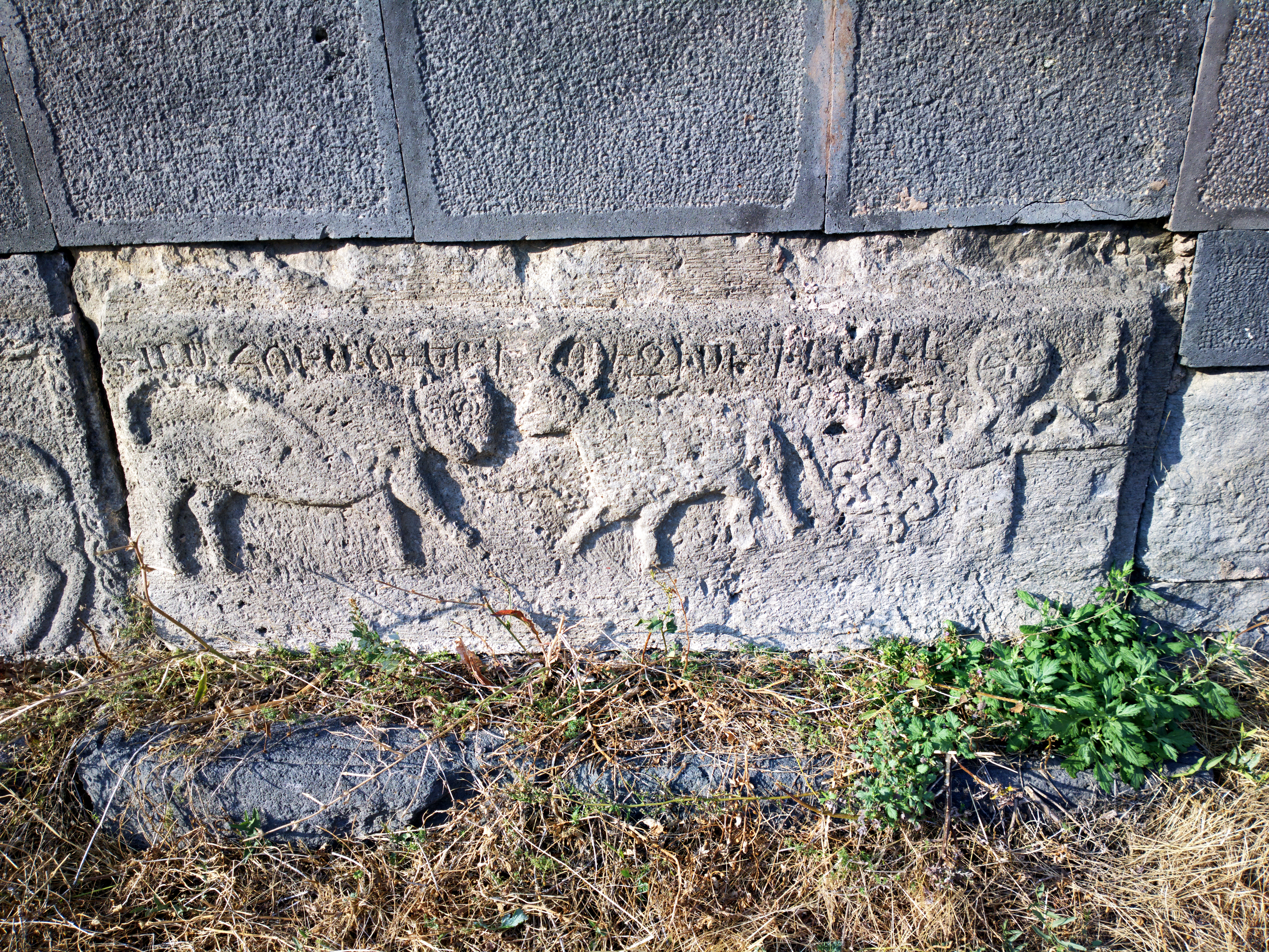

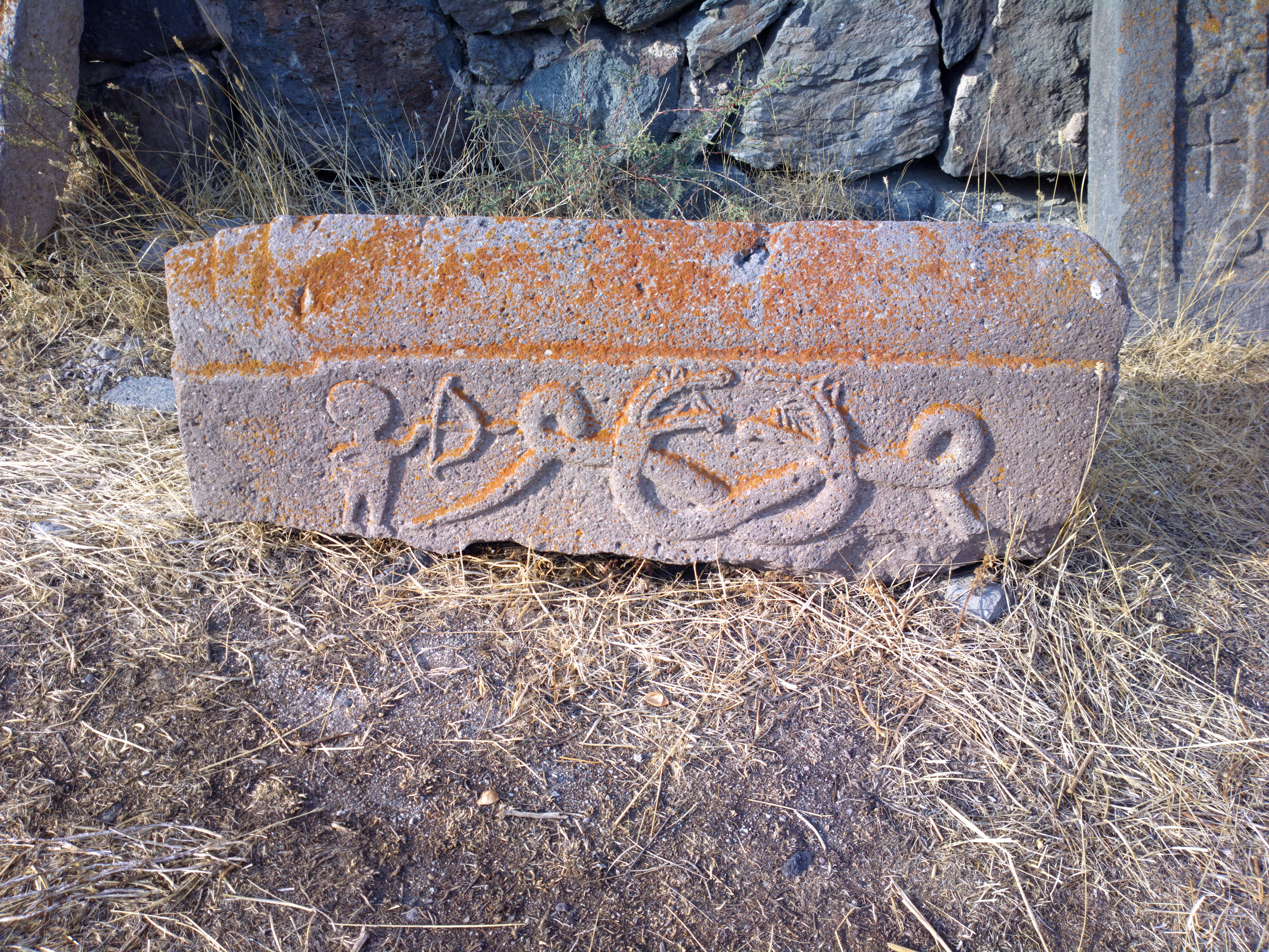

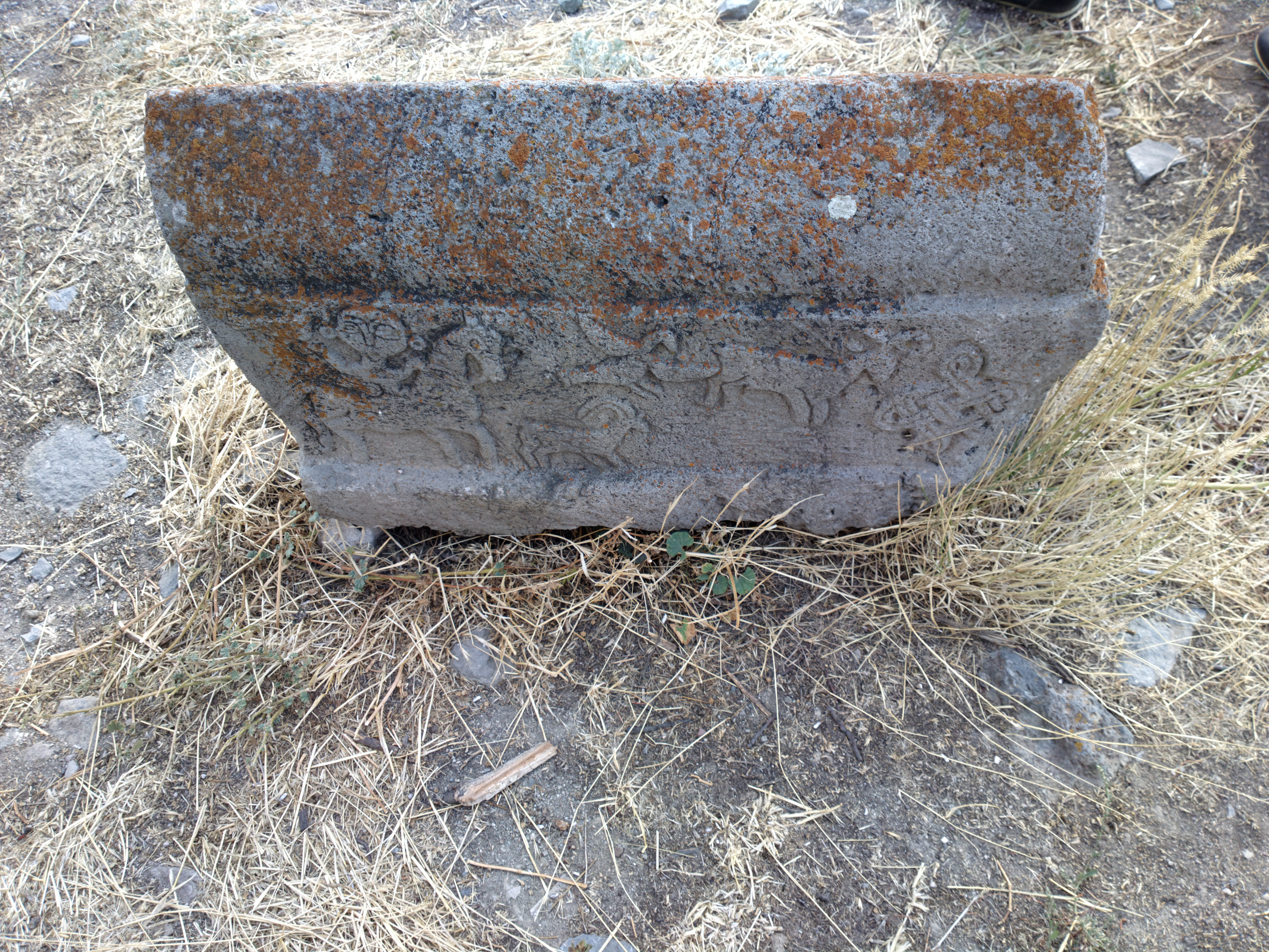
