= Vaghatin =

Vaghatin Վաղատին
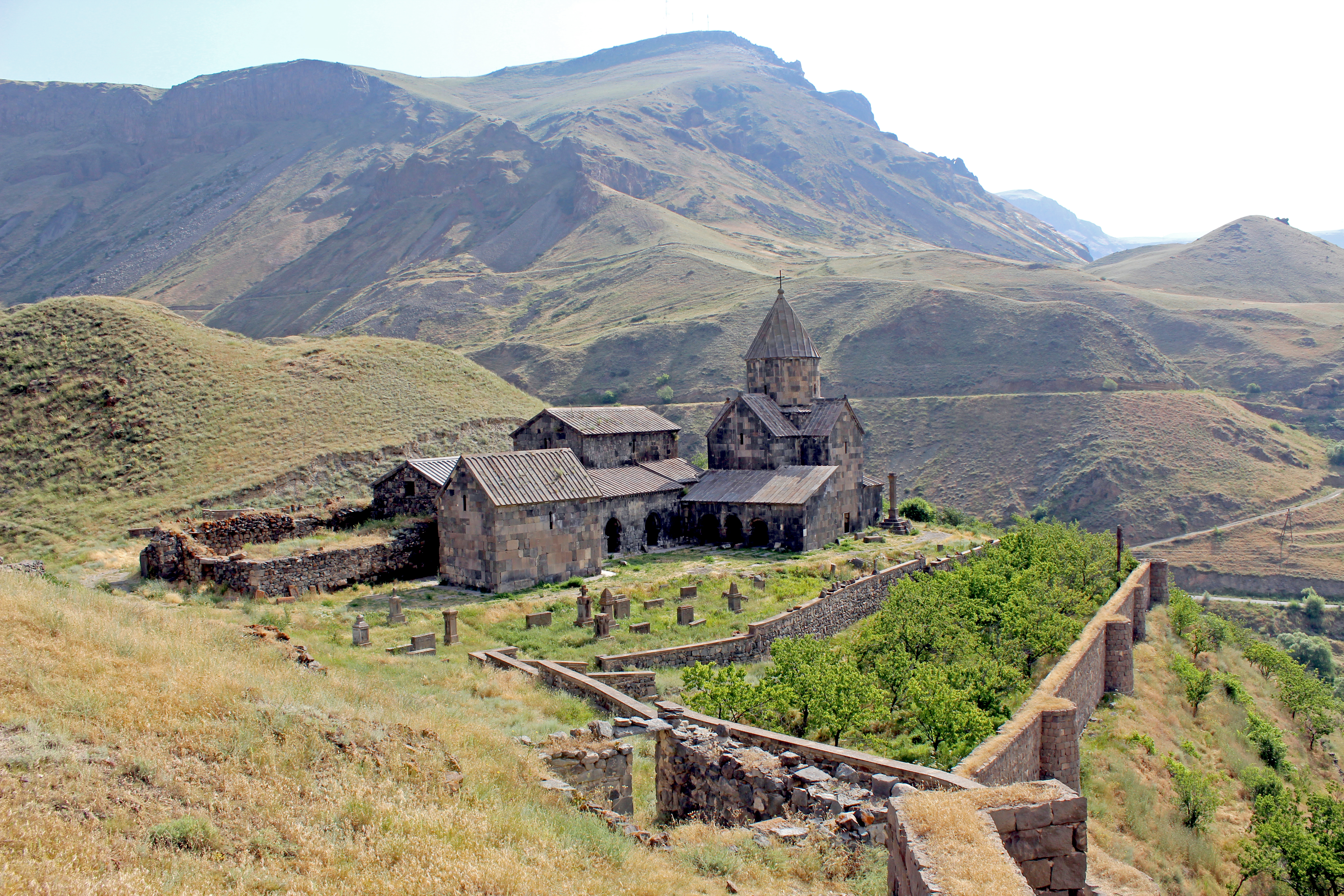
- Scenery around the nearby Vorotnavank monastery

- Location within Armenia Location within Syunik Province
- Coordinates: 39°30′19″N 46°07′05″E
- Country: Armenia
- Province: Syunik
- Municipality: Sisian

Area
  - Total: 40.82 km^{2} (15.76 sq mi)

Population (2011)
  - Total: 593
  - Density: 14.5/km^{2} (37.6/sq mi)
- Time zone: UTC+4 (AMT)

Vaghatin (Armenian: Վաղատին) is a village in the Sisian Municipality of the Syunik Province in Armenia. The Vorotnavank monastery is located close to Vaghatin.

== Demographics ==
The Statistical Committee of Armenia reported its population was 756 in 2010, up from 631 at the 2001 census.
