= Vorotnavan =

Vorotnavan Որոտնավան
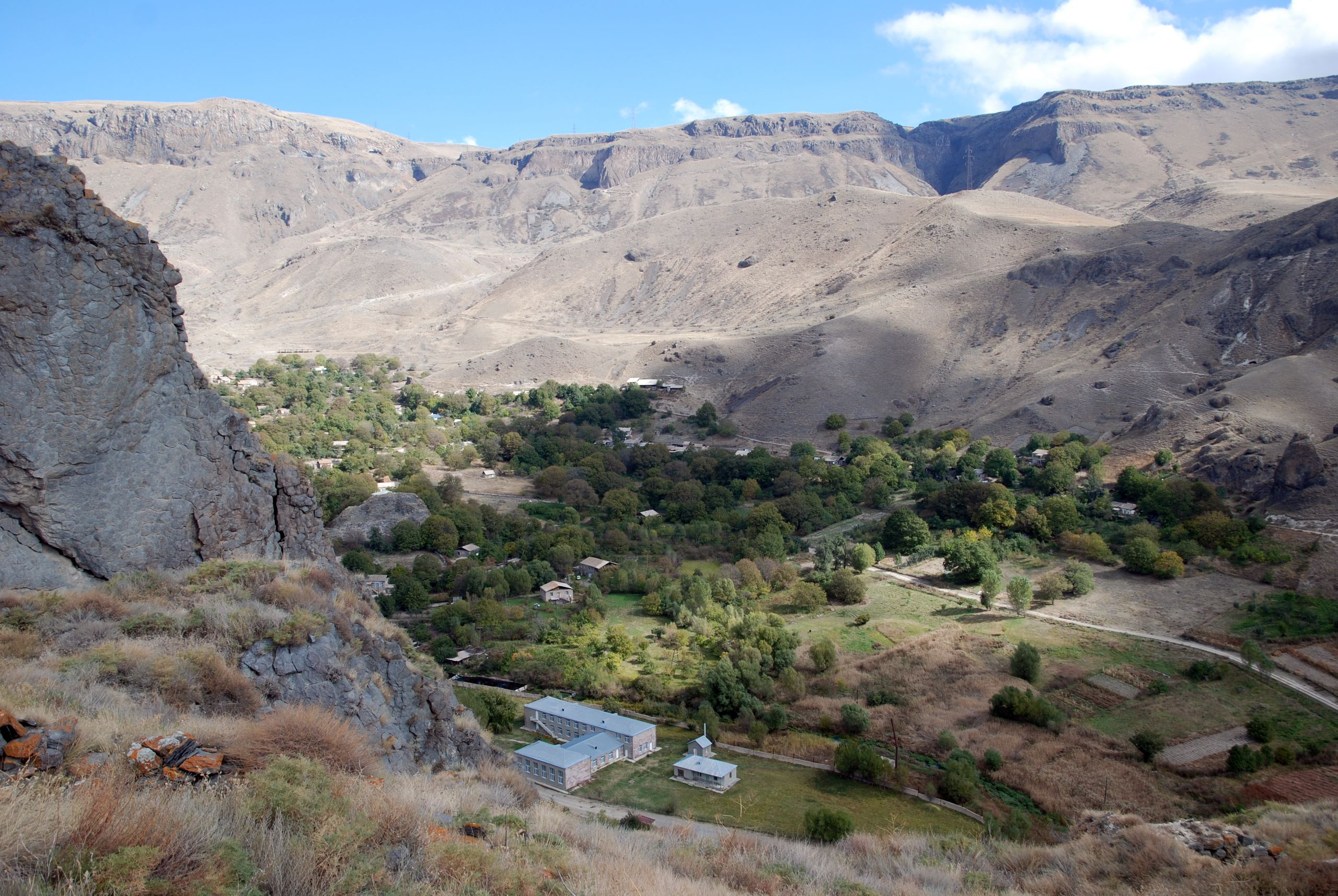

- Location within Armenia Location within Syunik Province
- Coordinates: 39°29′19″N 46°08′29″E
- Country: Armenia
- Province: Syunik
- Municipality: Sisian

Area
  - Total: 18.24 km^{2} (7.04 sq mi)

Population (2011)
  - Total: 263
  - Density: 14.4/km^{2} (37.3/sq mi)
- Time zone: UTC+4 (AMT)

Vorotnavan (Armenian: Որոտնավան) is a village in the Sisian Municipality of the Syunik Province in Armenia. The Vorotnaberd fortress is located near the village.

== Toponymy ==
The village was known as Urut (Armenian: Ուռուտ) until 1968.

== Demographics ==
The Statistical Committee of Armenia reported its population was 282 in 2010, down from 283 at the 2001 census.

== Gallery ==
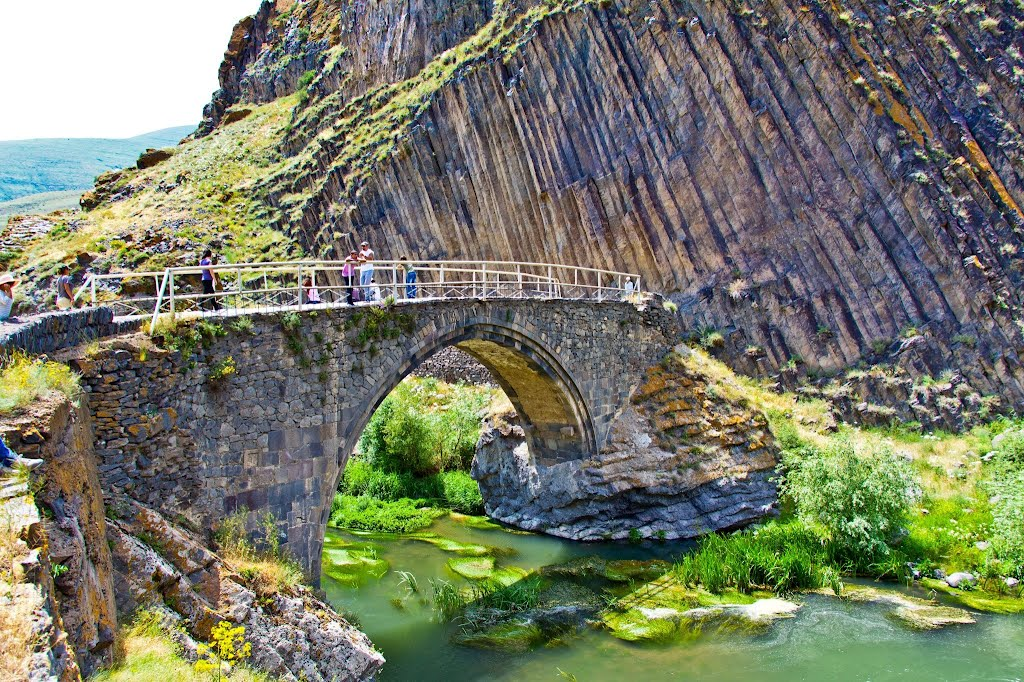
Melik Tangi bridge

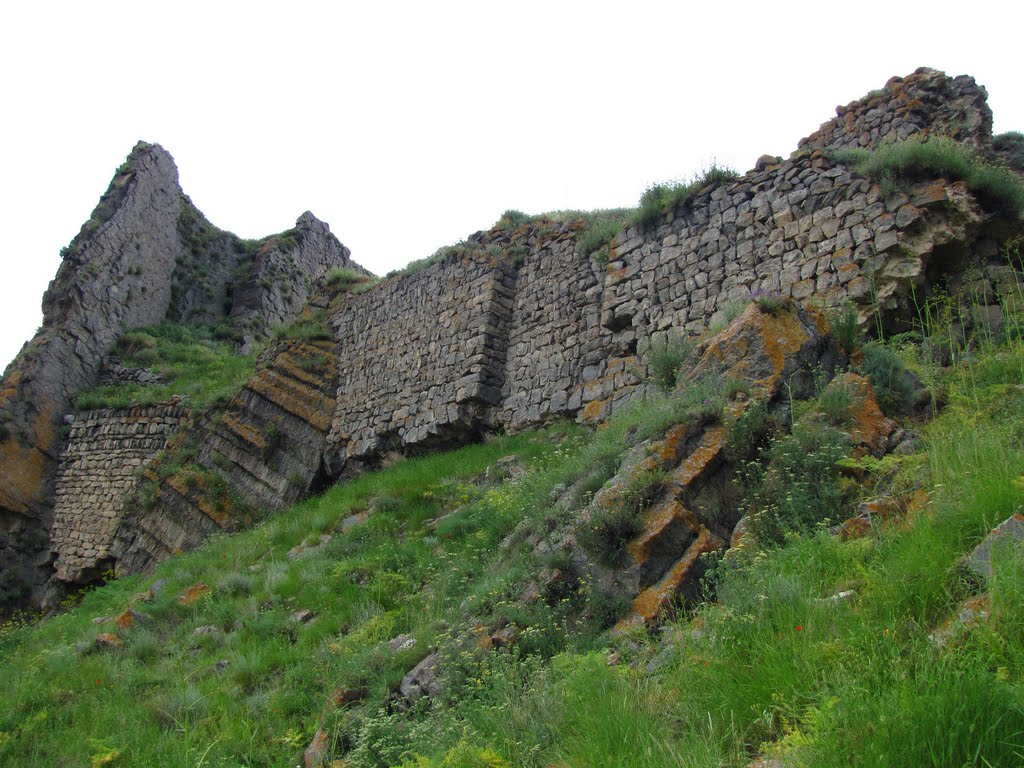
Vorotnaberd fortress

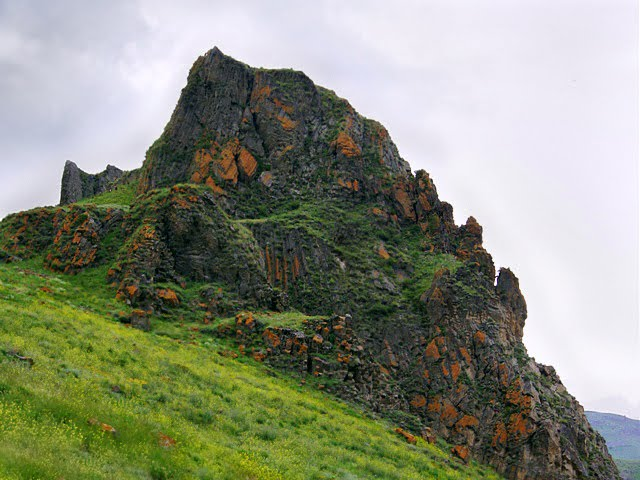
Vorotnaberd fortress

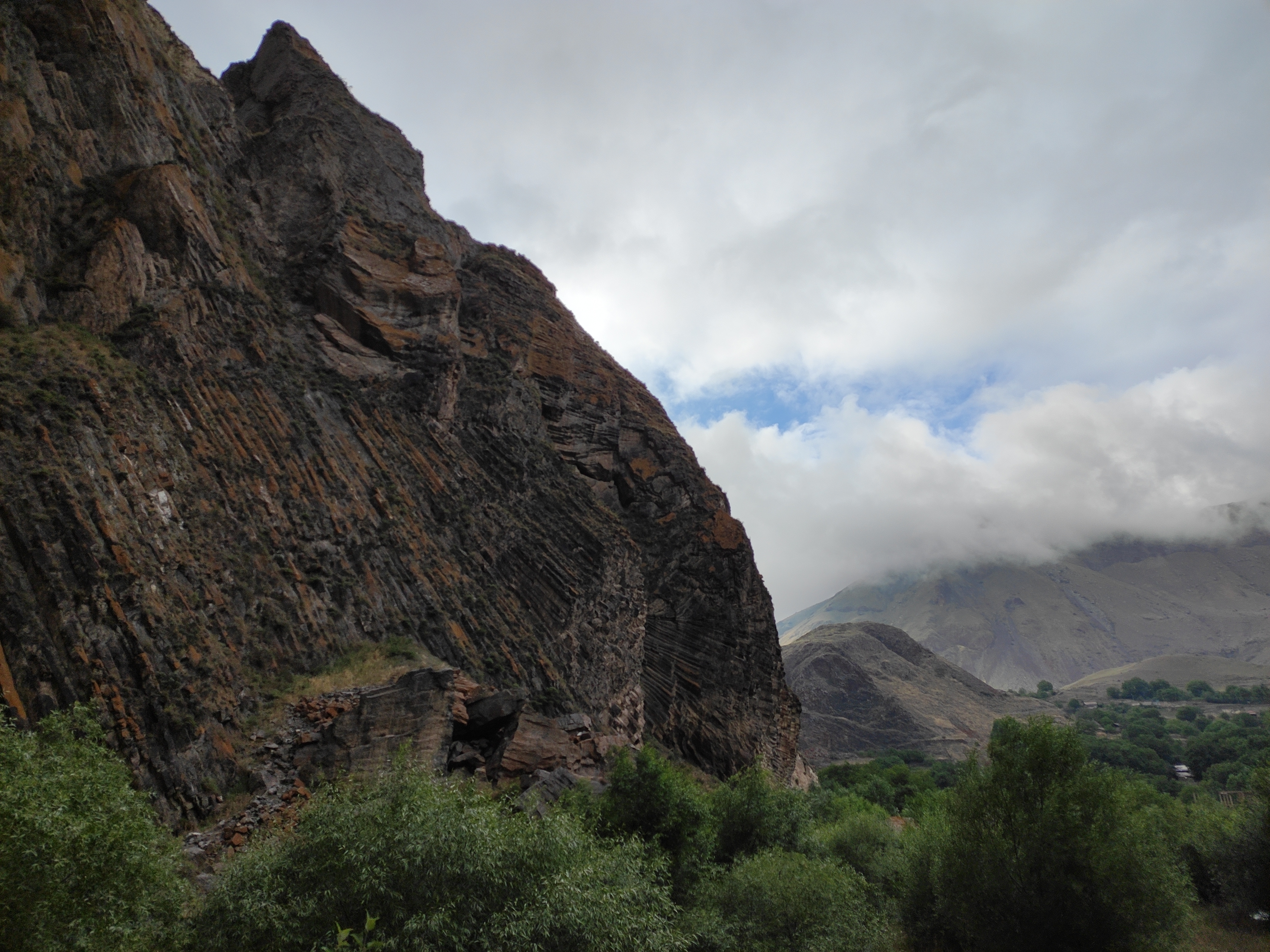
Scenery around Vorotnaberd

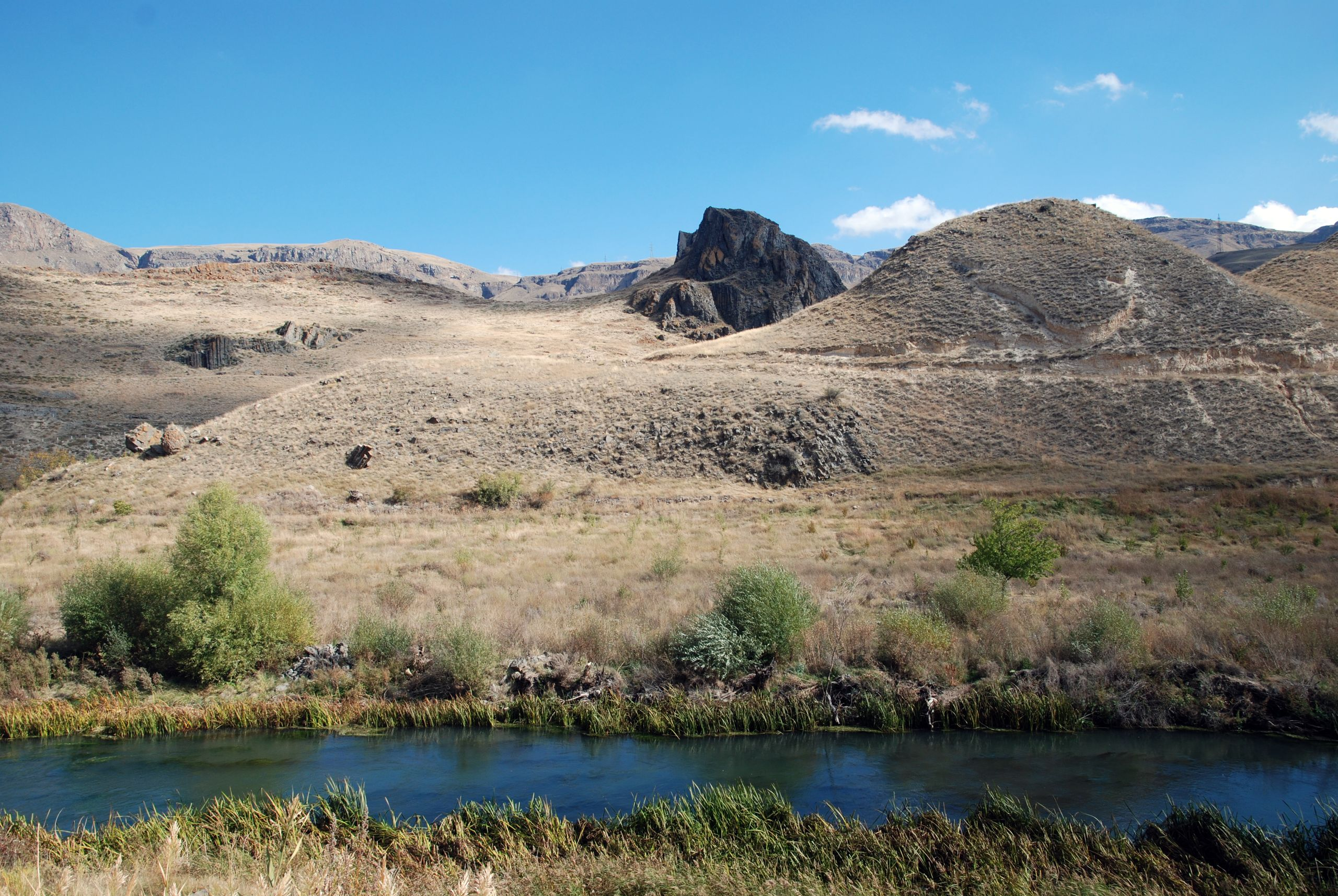
Scenery

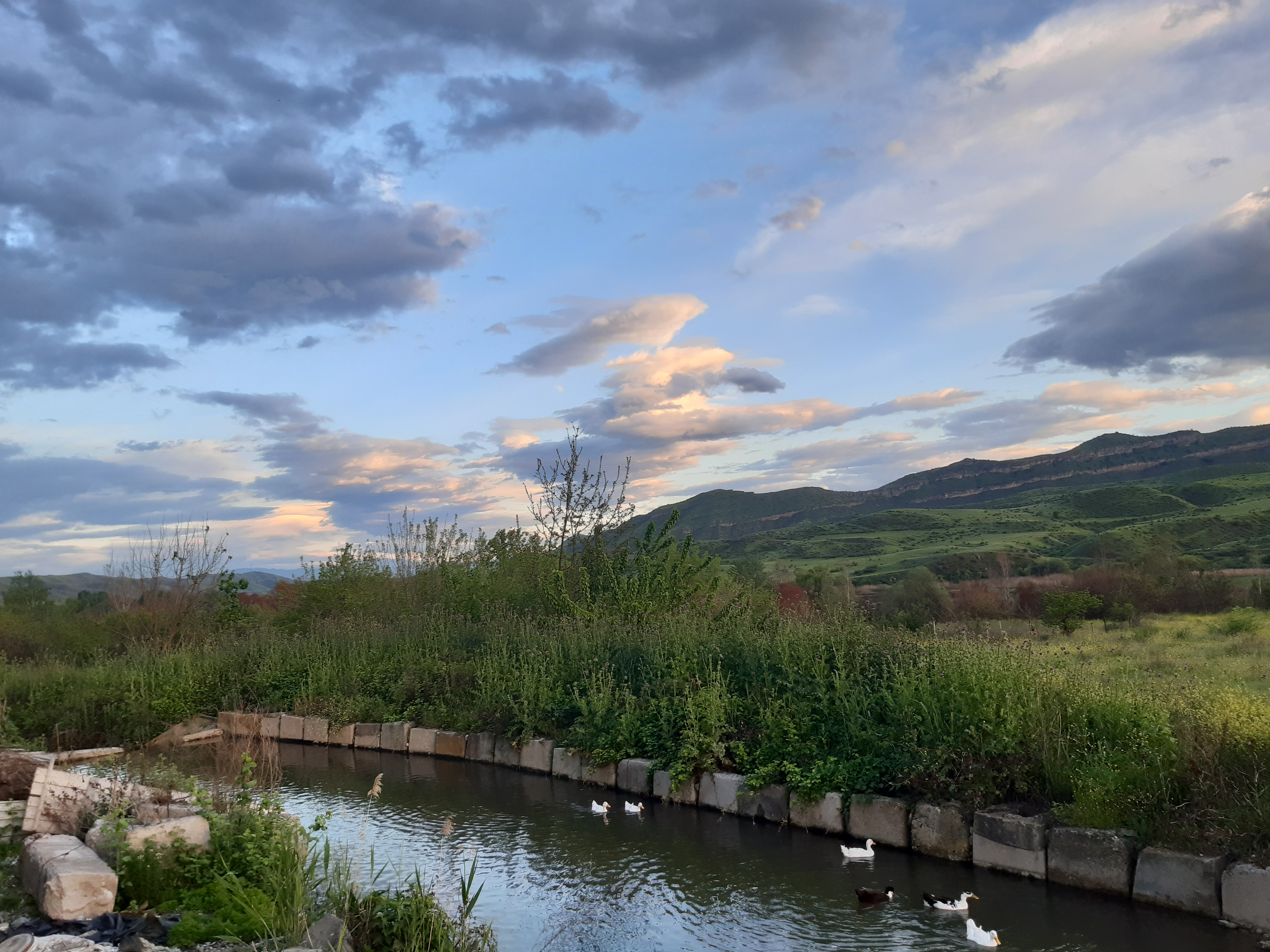
Vorotan river
