= Kavart =

- Location within Armenia Location within Syunik Province
- Coordinates: 39°14′06″N 46°23′41″E
- Country: Armenia
- Marz (Province): Syunik
- Time zone: UTC+4 ( )
  - Summer (DST): UTC+5 ( )

Kavart is a village in the Syunik Province of Armenia. There is a dilapidated high-dome Greek Orthodox church which was built in 1865 on the west side of the village. There are records that the area was first mined for copper as far back as the 8th century.

== See also ==
- Syunik Province
