= Verin Vachagan =

- Location within Armenia Location within Syunik Province
- Coordinates: 39°10′45″N 46°22′28″E
- Country: Armenia
- Marz (Province): Syunik
- Time zone: UTC+4 ( )
  - Summer (DST): UTC+5 ( )

Verin Vachagan (also, Verkhniy Vachagan) is a town in the Syunik Province of Armenia.
