= Diocese of Kotayk =

Diocese of Kotayk Կոտայքի թեմ
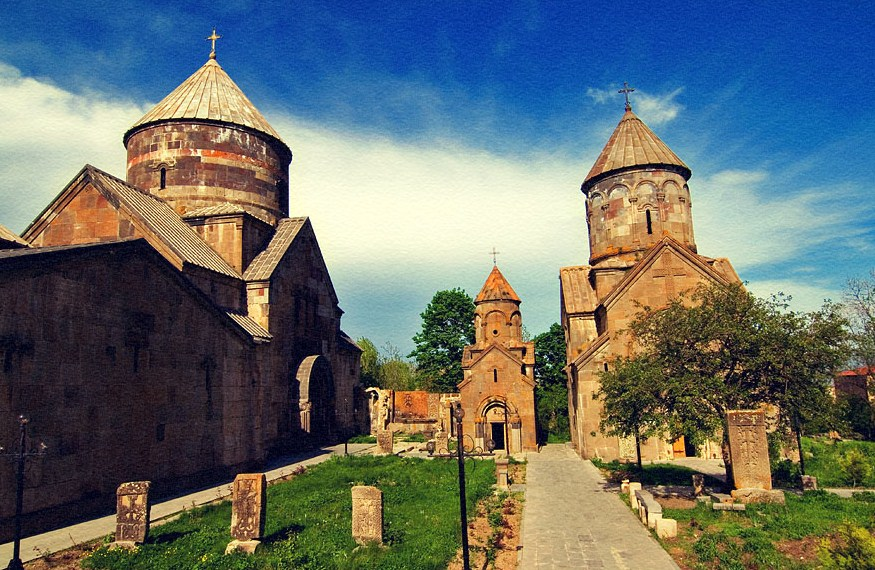
- Kecharis Monastery

Location
- Country: Armenia

Statistics
- Population: Total: (as of 2011); ~200,000

Information
- Denomination: Armenian Apostolic Church
- Rite: Armenian Rite
- Established: 1996
- Cathedral: Kecharis Monastery, Tsaghkadzor

Current leadership
- Patriarch: Karekin II
- Primate: Archbishop Arakel Karamyan

Website
- Official website

Diocese of Kotayk (Armenian: Կոտայքի թեմ Kotayki t'em), is a diocese of the Armenian Apostolic Church covering the Kotayk Province of Armenia. The name is derived from the historic Kotayk canton of Ayrarat province of Armenia Major.

The diocese was officially founded on May 30, 1996, upon a kontakion issued by Catholicos Karekin I. The diocesan headquarters are located in the provincial capital Hrazdan, while the cathedral of the diocese is the Kecharis Monastery in the nearby town of Tsaghkadzor.

== History ==
The Diocese of Kotayk is considered the successor of the historic Diocese of Bjni founded by Catholicos Peter I in 1031. Bjni was one of the largest dioceses of medieval Armenia. The bishop of Bjni was one of 4 bishops that possessed a special privilege in the election of the Catholicos of All Armenians, others being the bishops of Syunik, Haghpat and Artaz.

The Diocese of Bjni has been intact until the mid 18th century.

== Active churches ==
Here is the list of churches, monasteries and chapels functioning under the jurisdiction of the Diocese of Kotayk, along with their location and year of consecration:

=== Churches ===
- Surp Kiraki Church, Arzni, 6th century
- Surp Sarkis Church, Bjni, 7th century
- Surp Hovhannes Church, Alapars, 7th century
- Surp Vartan Zoravar Church, Alapars, 901
- Holy Mother of God Church, Bjni, 1031
- Mashtots Hayrapet Church, Garni, 12th century
- Holy Mother of God Church, Yeghvard, 1301
- Kaptavank Church, Kaputan, 1349
- Holy Mother of God Church, Garni, 17th century
- Surp Stepanos Church, Abovyan, 1851
- Surp Karapet Church, Akunk, 1855
- Holy Cross Church, Hrazdan, 1861
- Surp Hakob Church, Aramus, 1863
- Holy Mother of God Church, Fantan, 19th century
- Holy Mother of God Church, Solak, 19th century
- Holy Mother of God Church, Meghradzor, 1881
- Holy Mother of God Church, Hrazdan, 1883
- Saint George's Church, Argel, 1890
- Surp Hovhannes Church, Arinj, 1890
- Holy Mother of God Church, Jrvezh, 1891
- Holy Mother of God Church, Alapars, 1897
- Holy Saviour's Church, Charentsavan, 2000
- Surp Harutyun Church, Nurnus, 2001
- Holy Mother of God Church, Arinj, 2002
- Holy Martyrs Church, Teghenik, 2003
- Tukh Manuk Church, Hrazdan, 2003
- Saint John the Baptist Church, Abovyan, 2013
- Saint George's Church, Hrazdan, 2013
- Holy Saviour's Church, Nor Hachn, 2015
- Holy Cross Church, Garni, 2015
- Surp Sarkis Church, Yeghvard, 2017
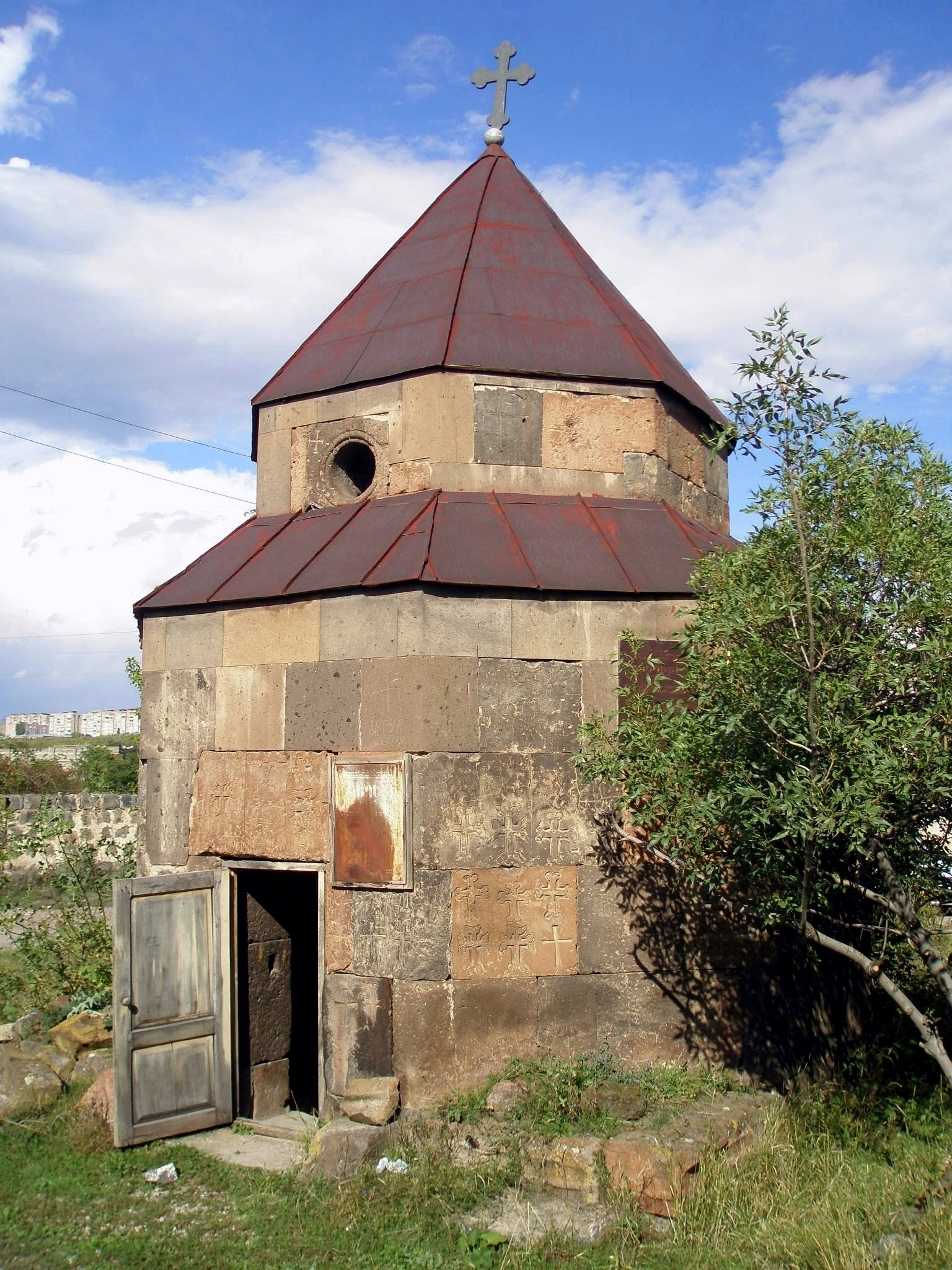
Surp Kiraki Church, Arzni, 6th century

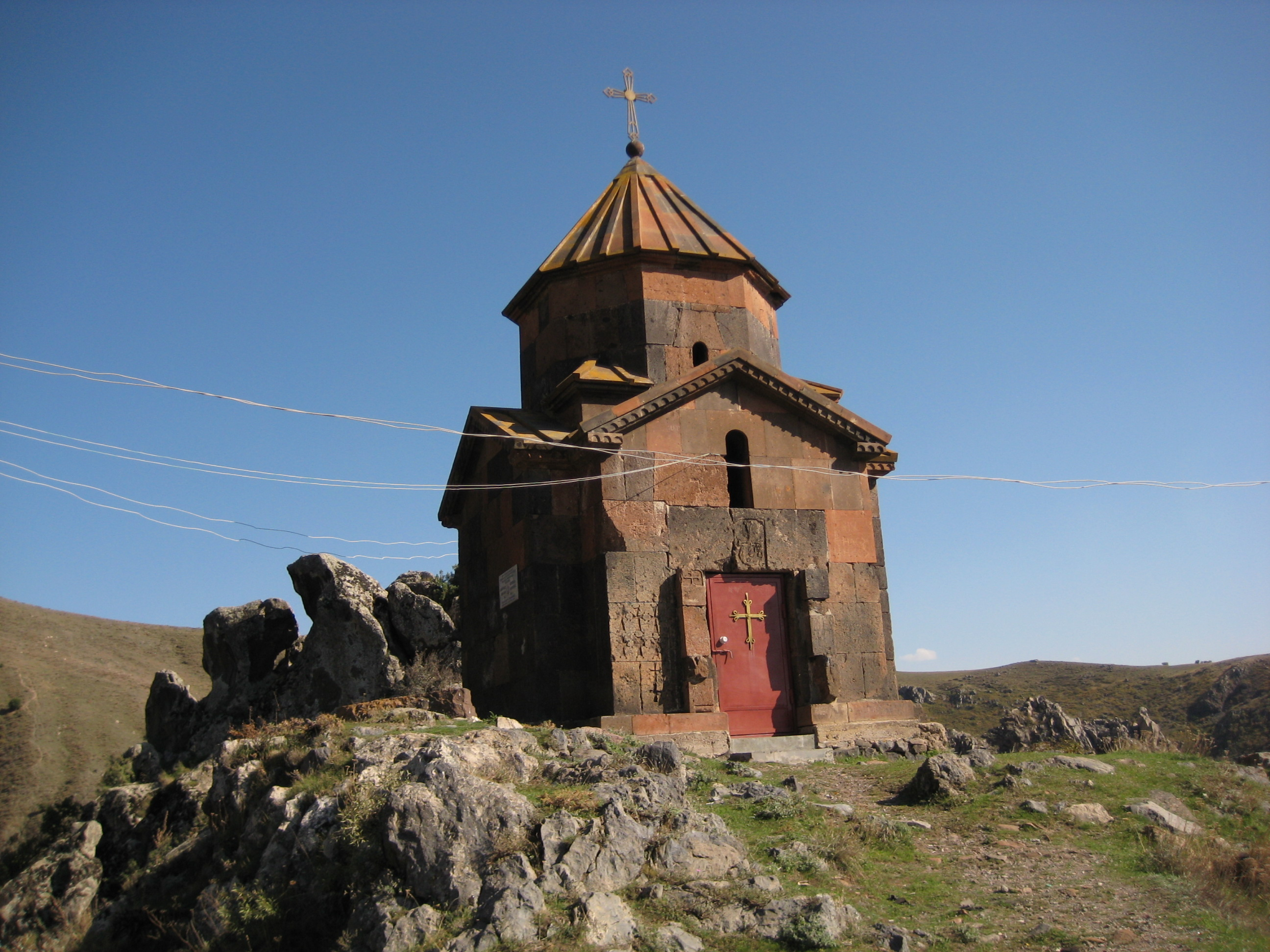
Surp Sarkis Church, Bjni, 7th century

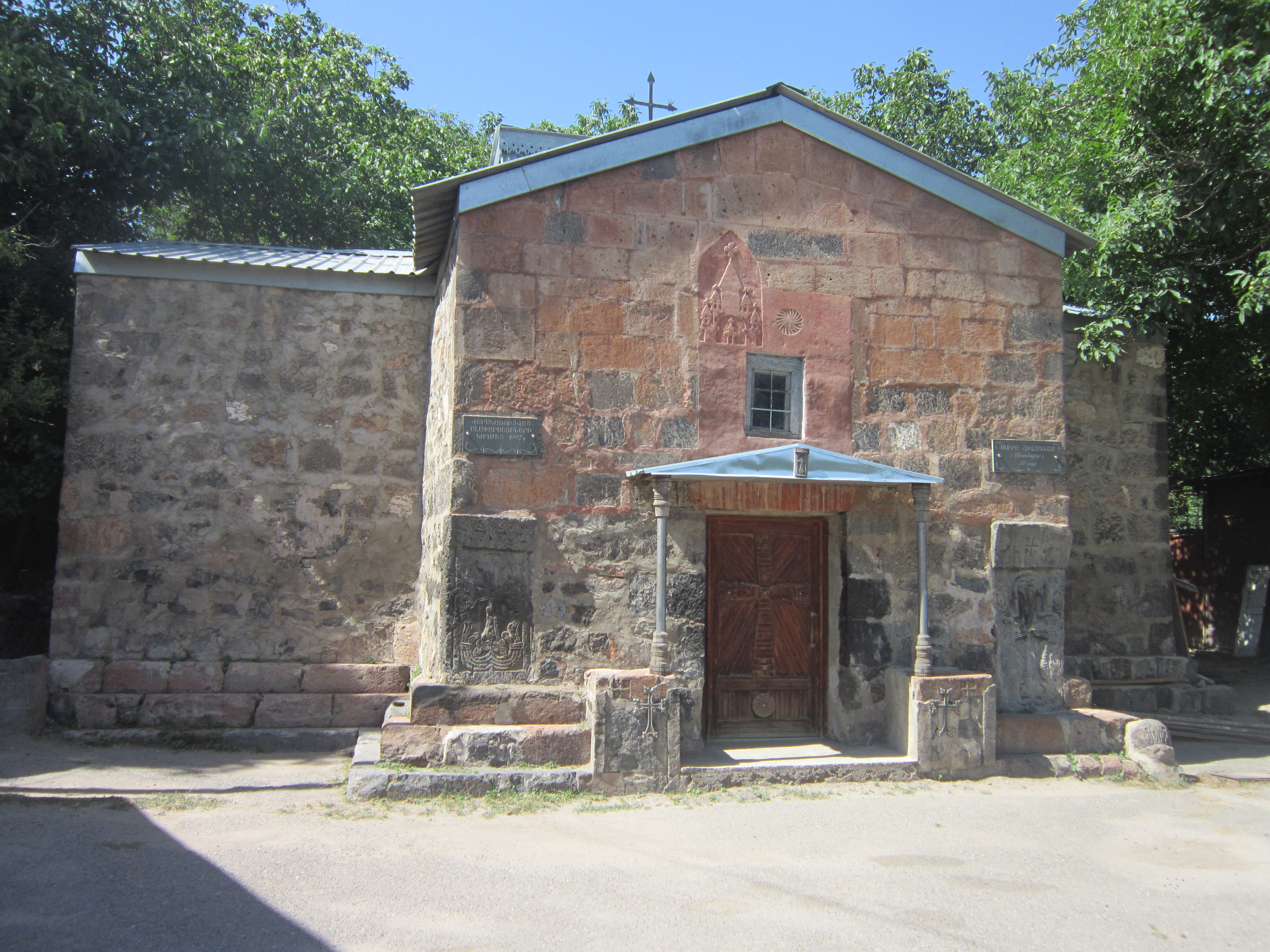
Surp Hovhannes Church, Alapars, 7th century

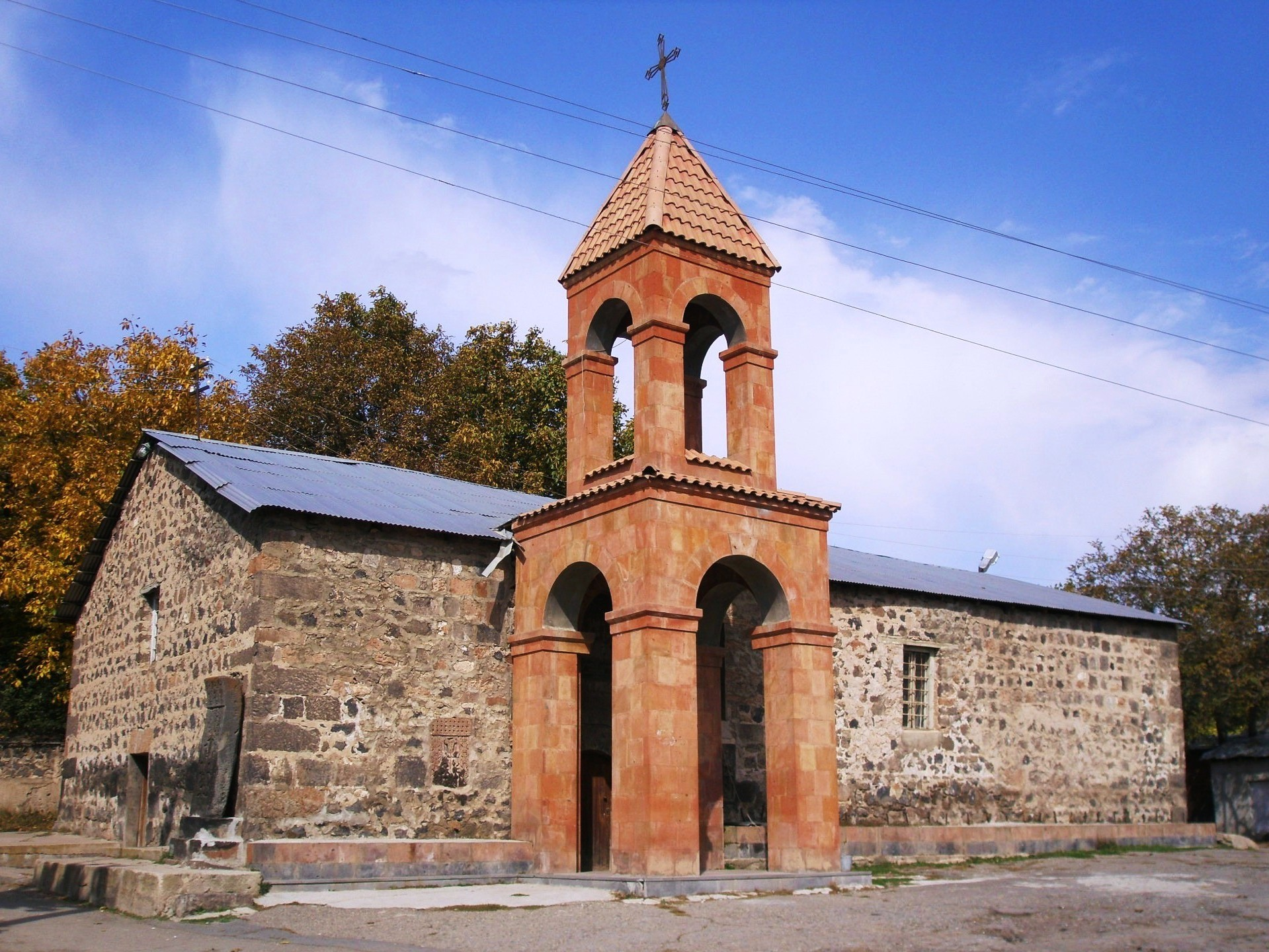
Surp Vartan Zoravar Church, Alapars, 901

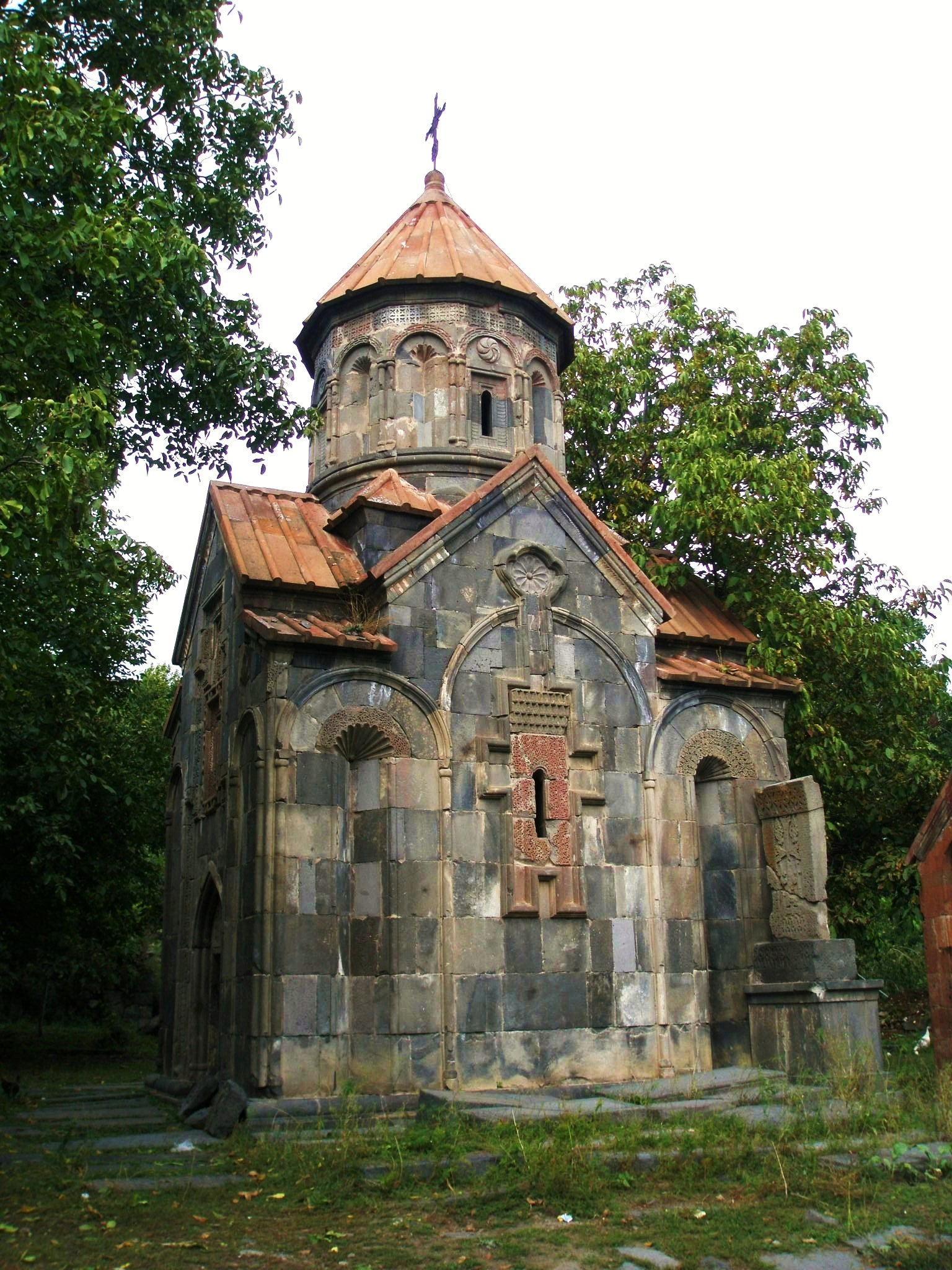
Mashtots Hayrapet Church, Garni, 12th century

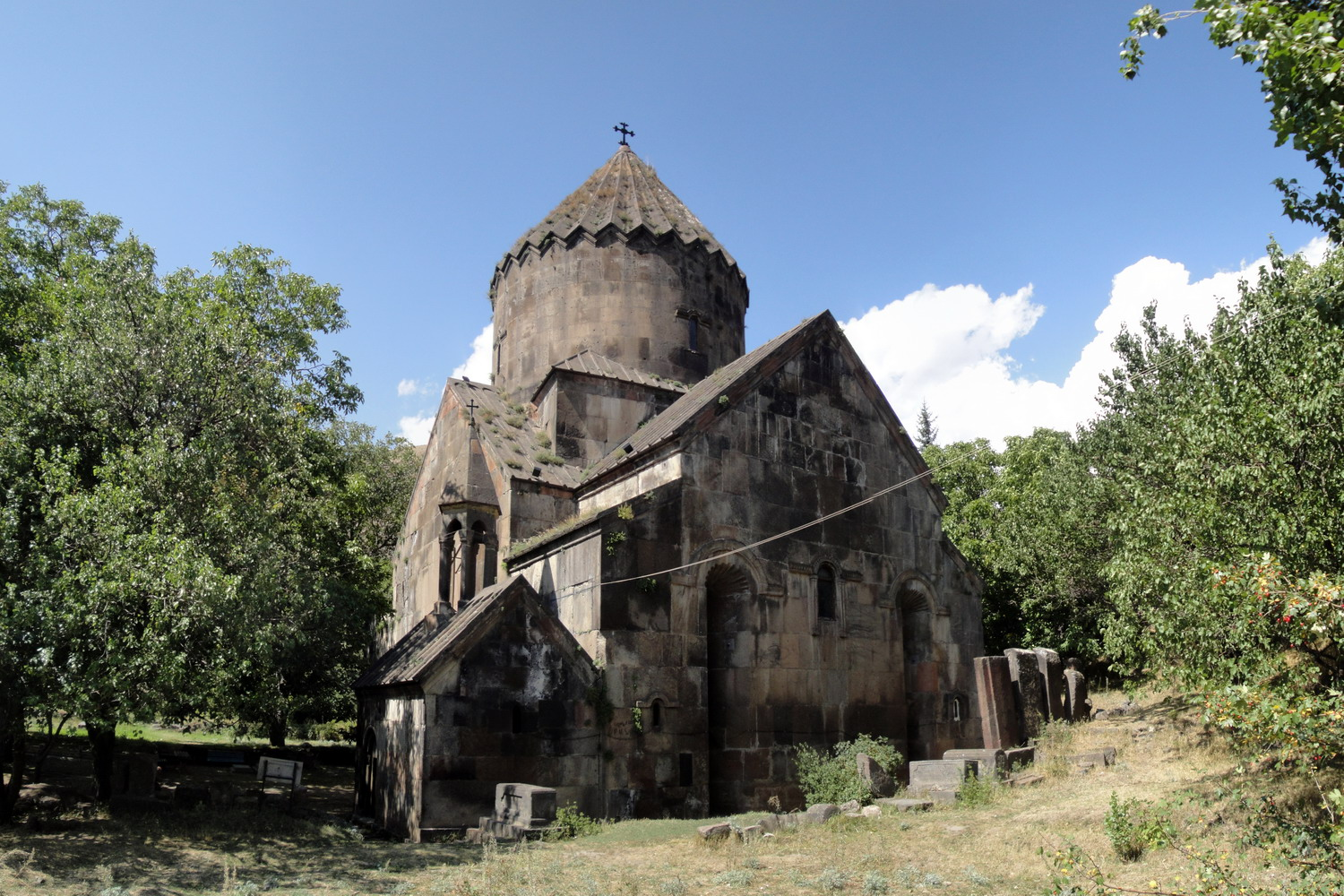
Holy Mother of God Church, Bjni, 1031

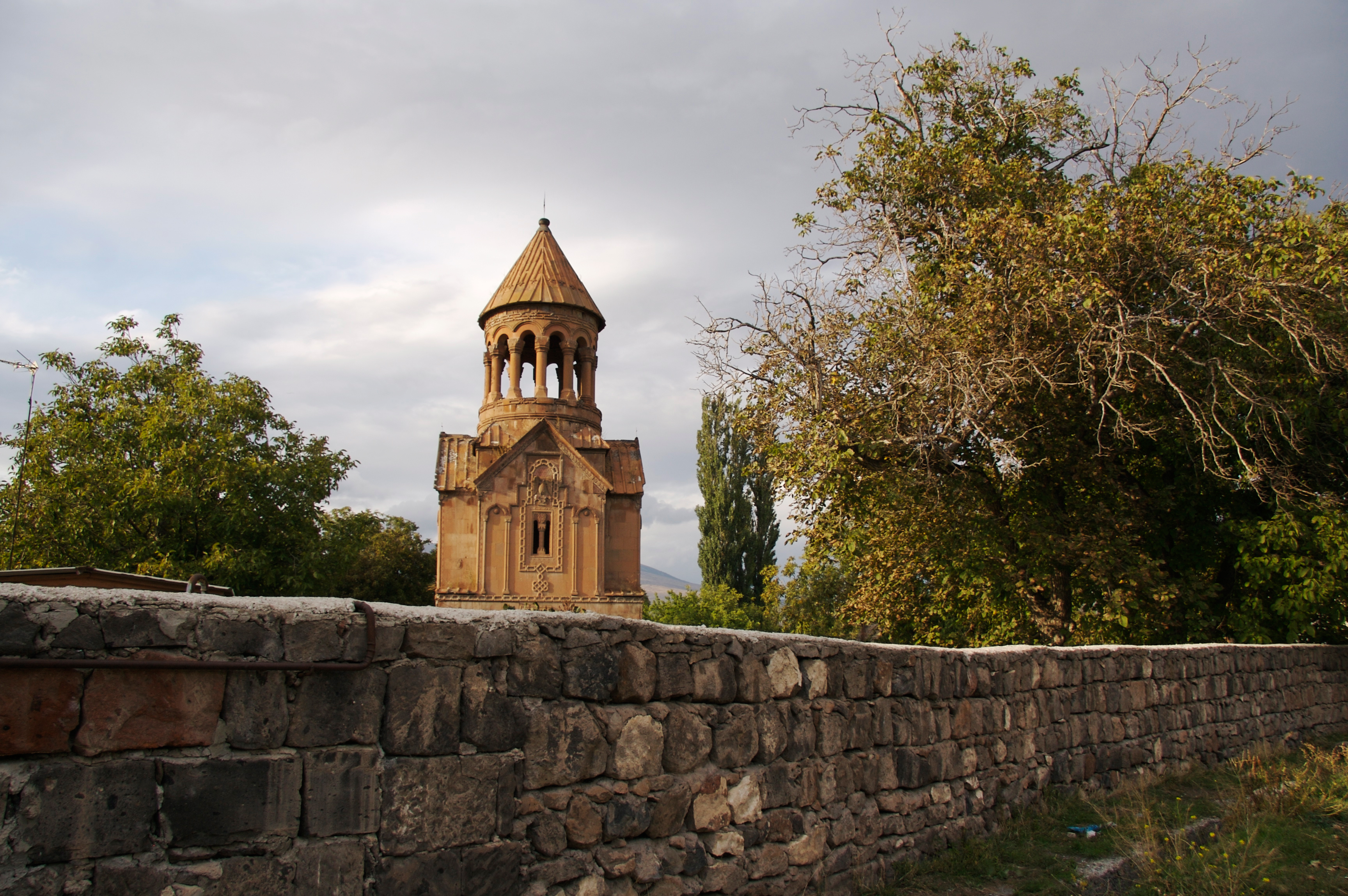
Holy Mother of God Church, Yeghvard, 1301

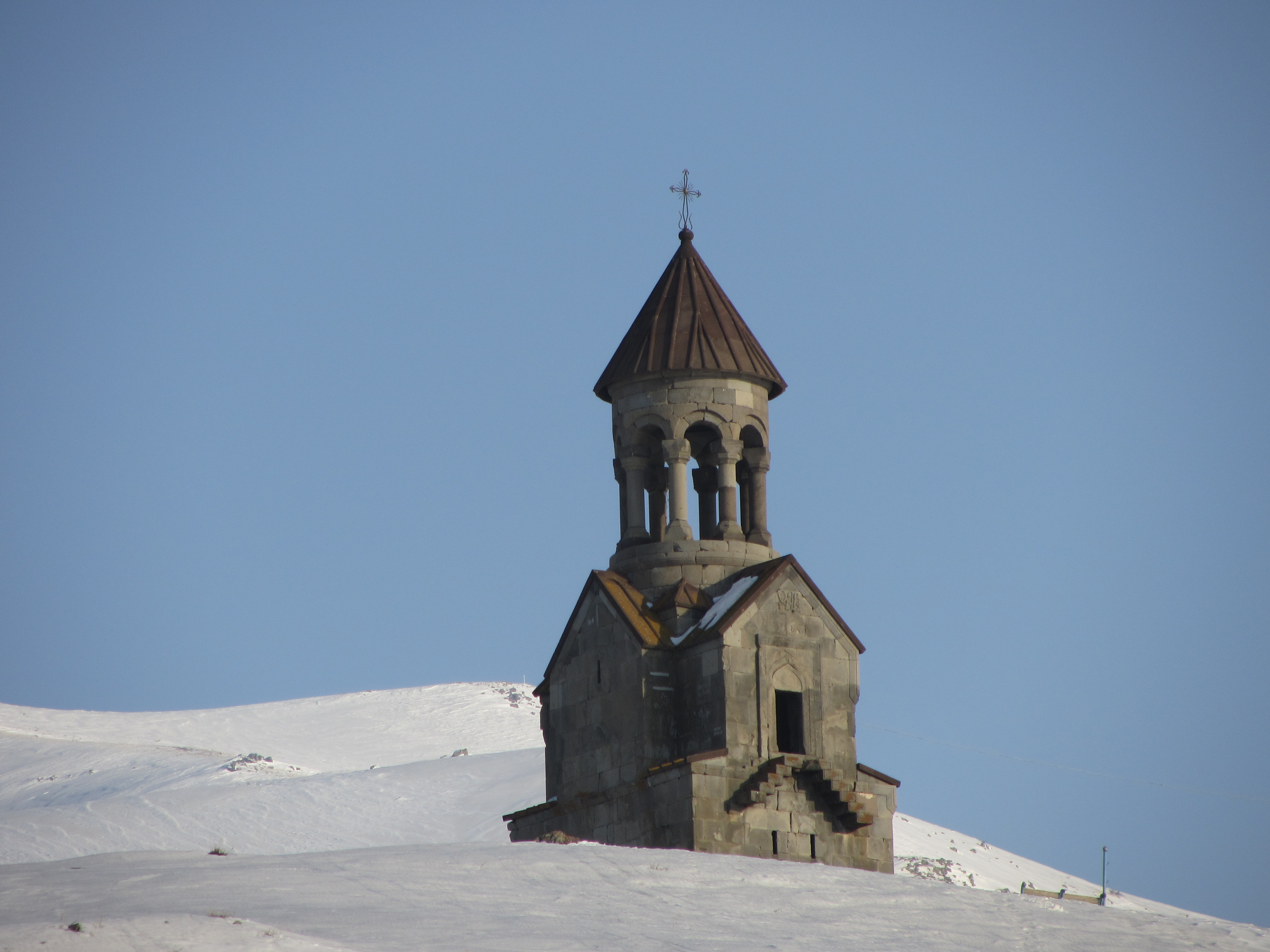
Kaptavank Church, Kaputan, 1349

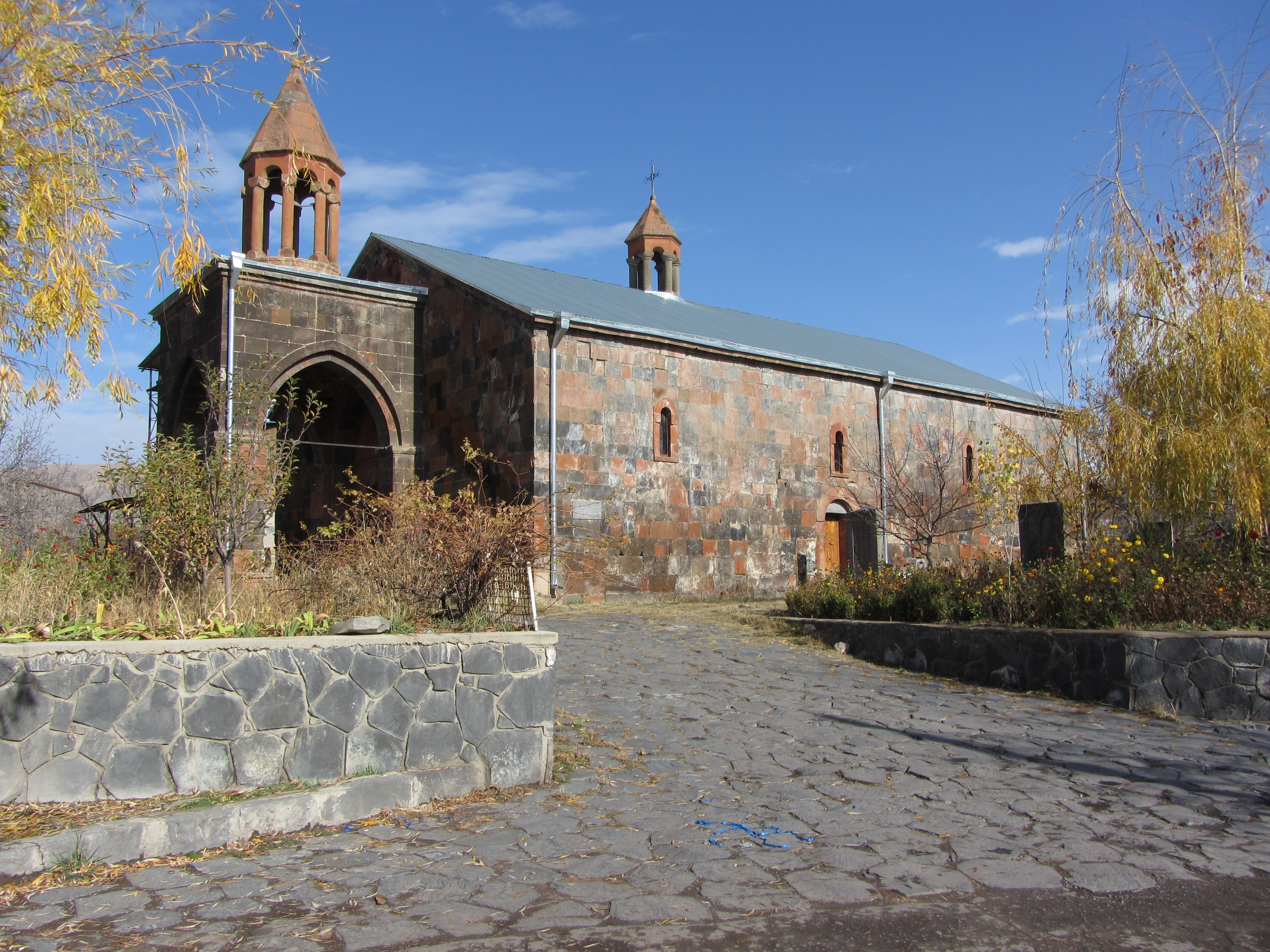
Holy Mother of God CHurch, Garni, 17th century

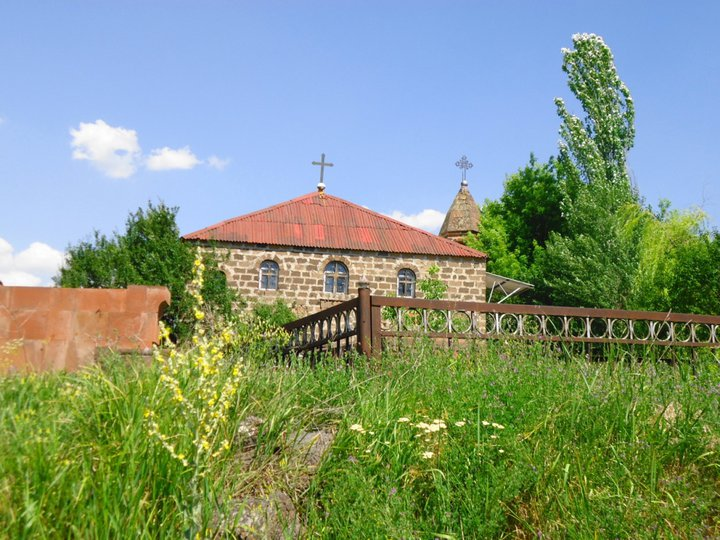
Surp Stepanos Church, Abovyan, 1851

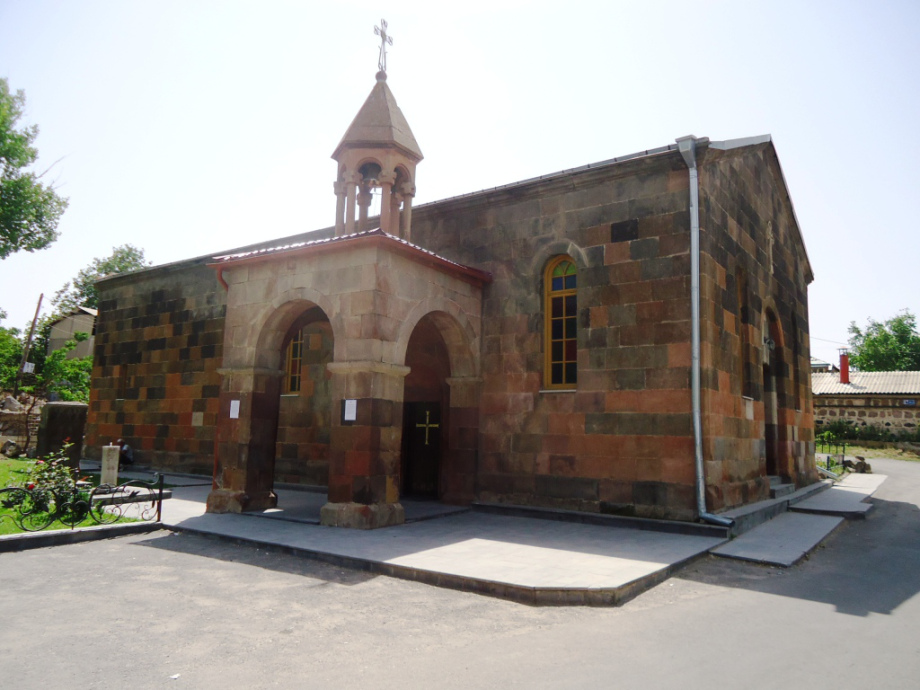
Surp Karapet Church, Akunk, 1855

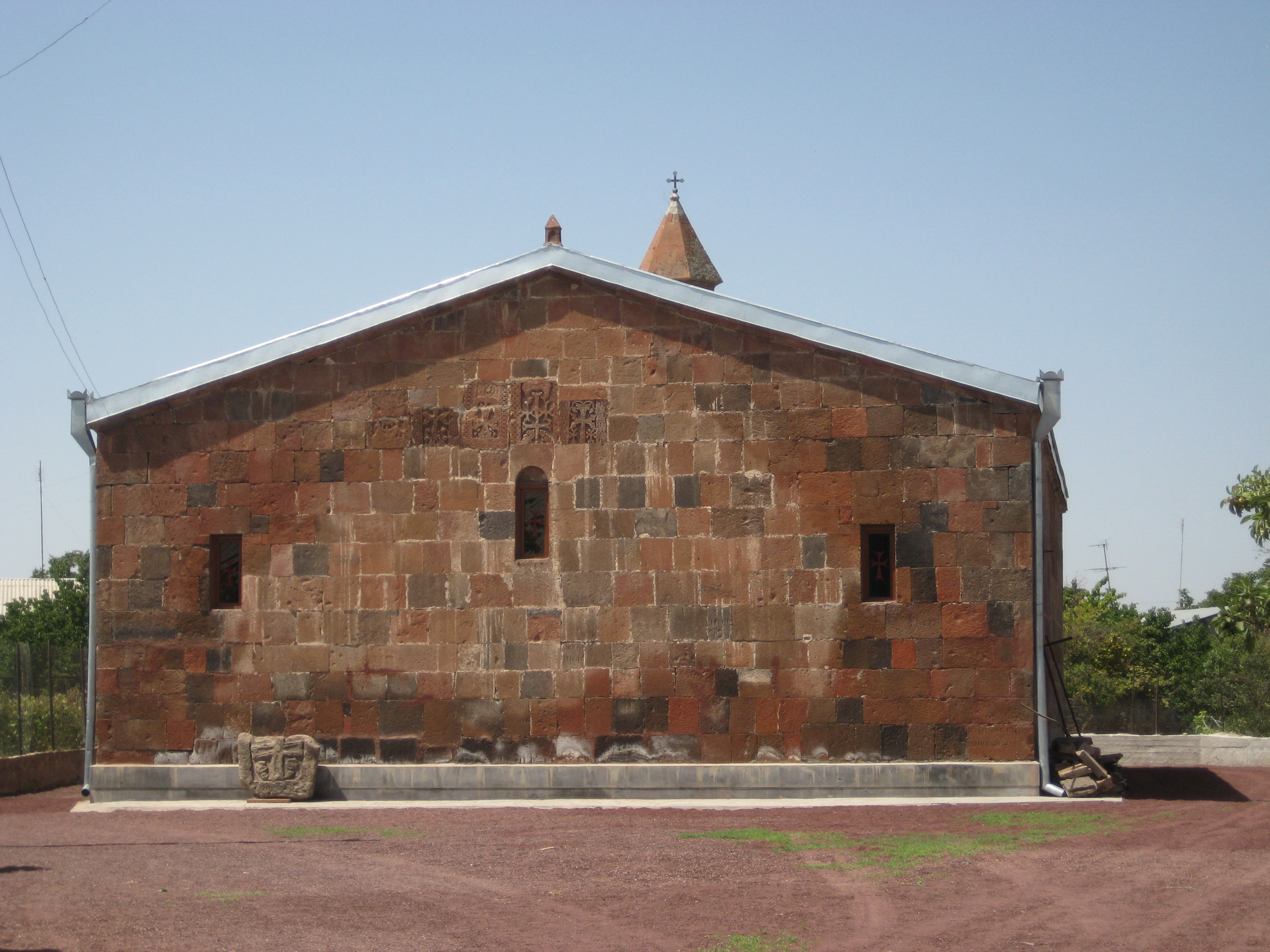
Surp Hakob Church, Aramus, 1863

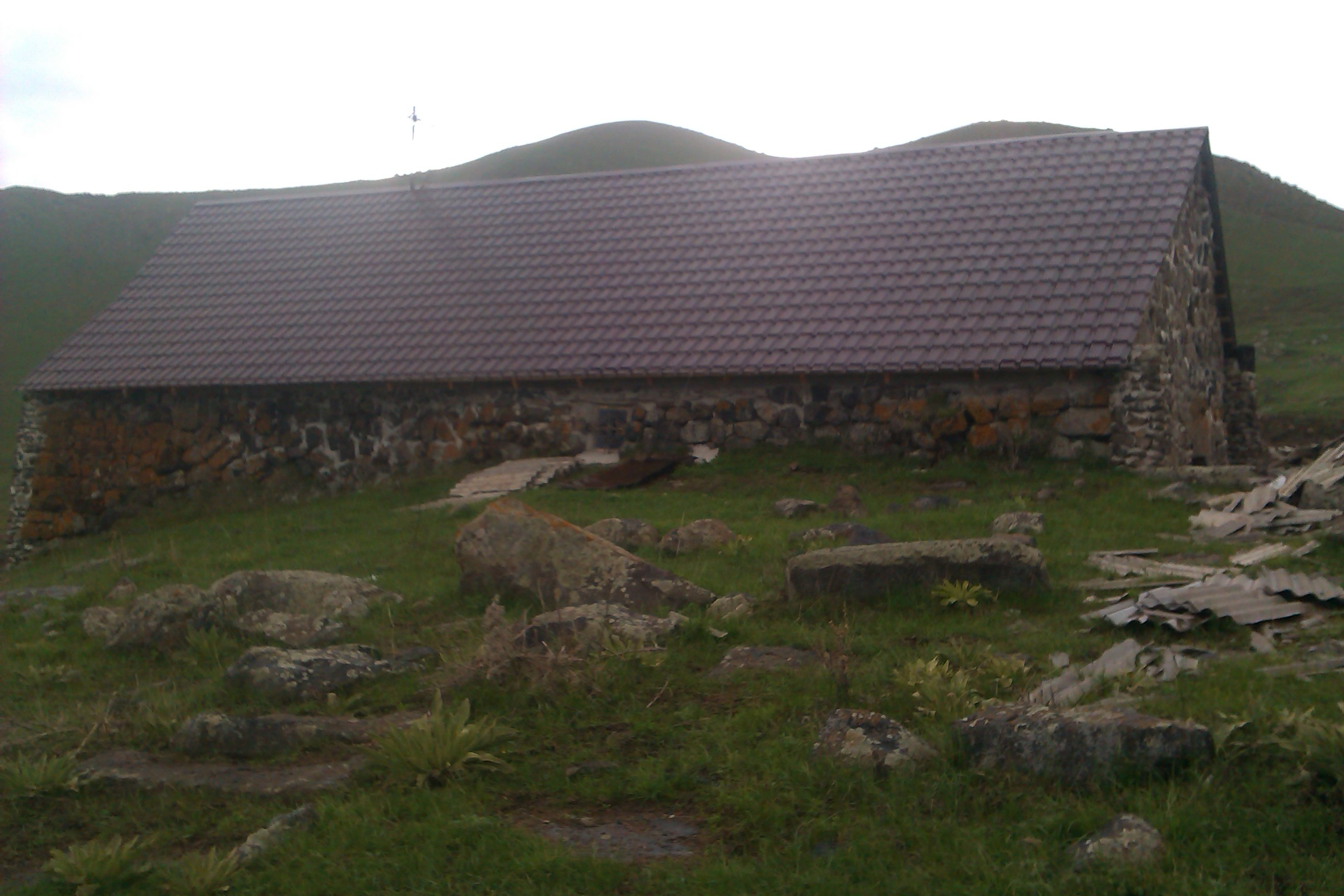
Holy Mother of God Church, Fantan, 19th century

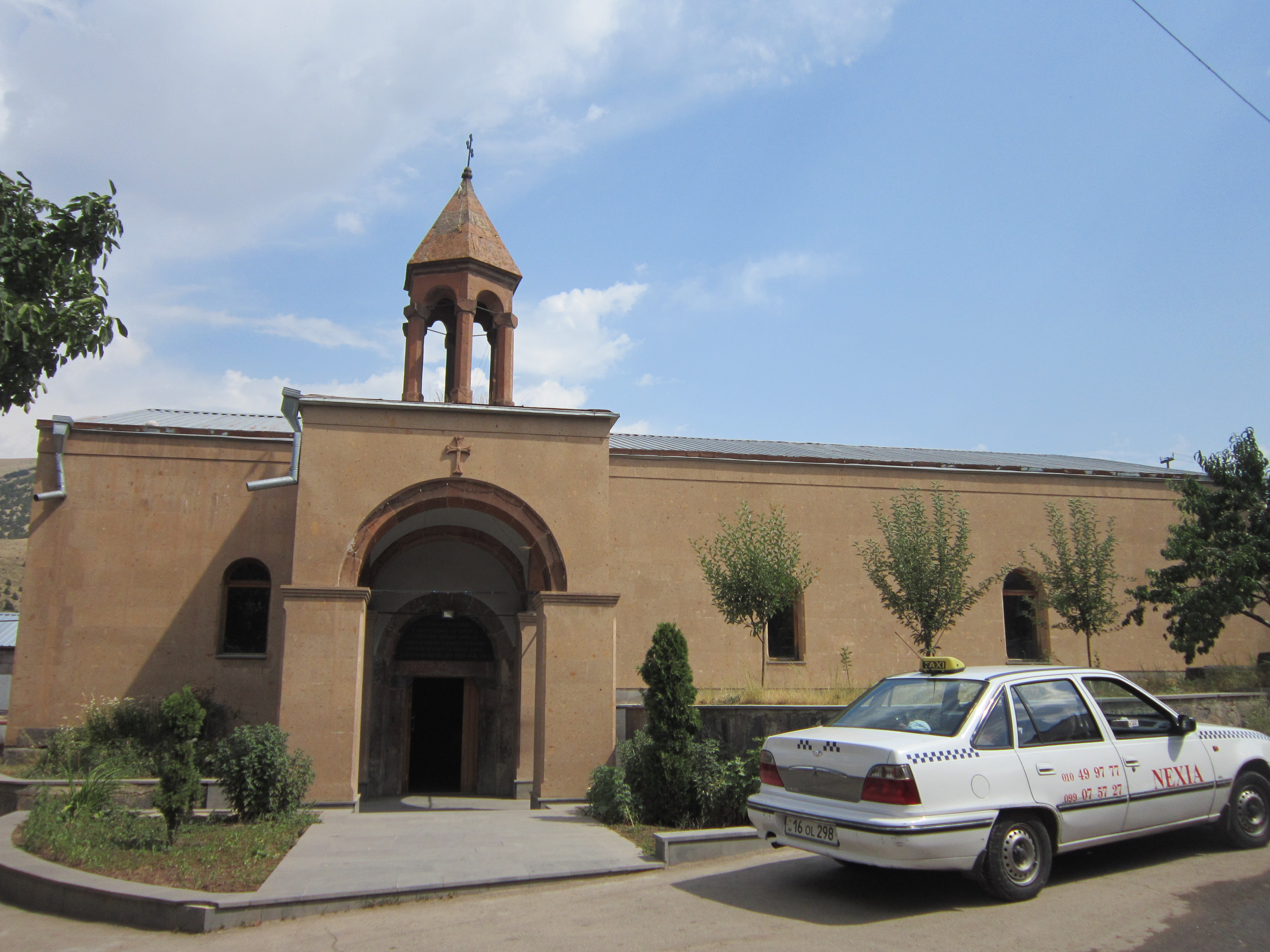
Holy Mother of God Church, Solak, 19th century

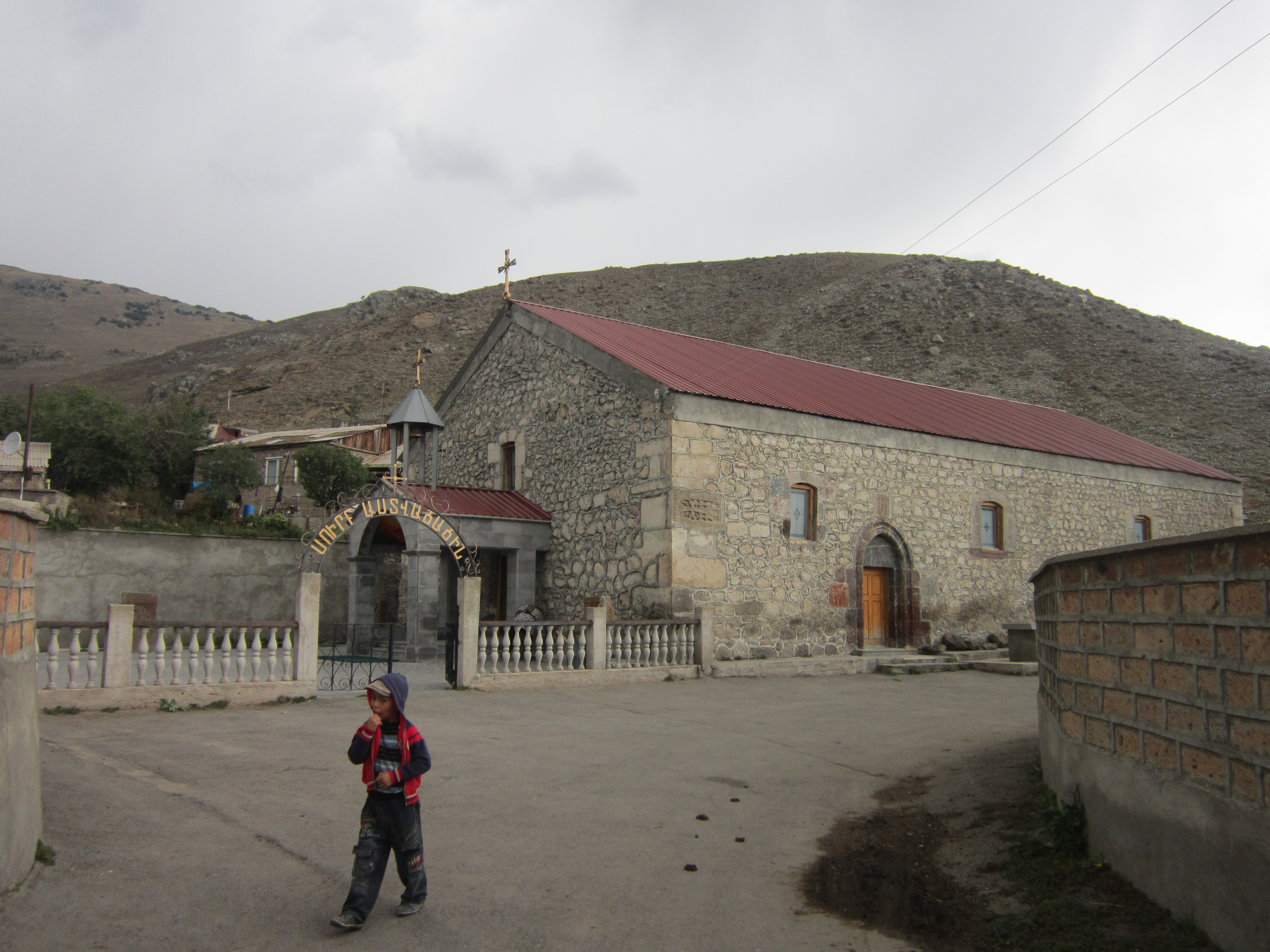
Holy Mother of God Church, Meghradzor, 1881

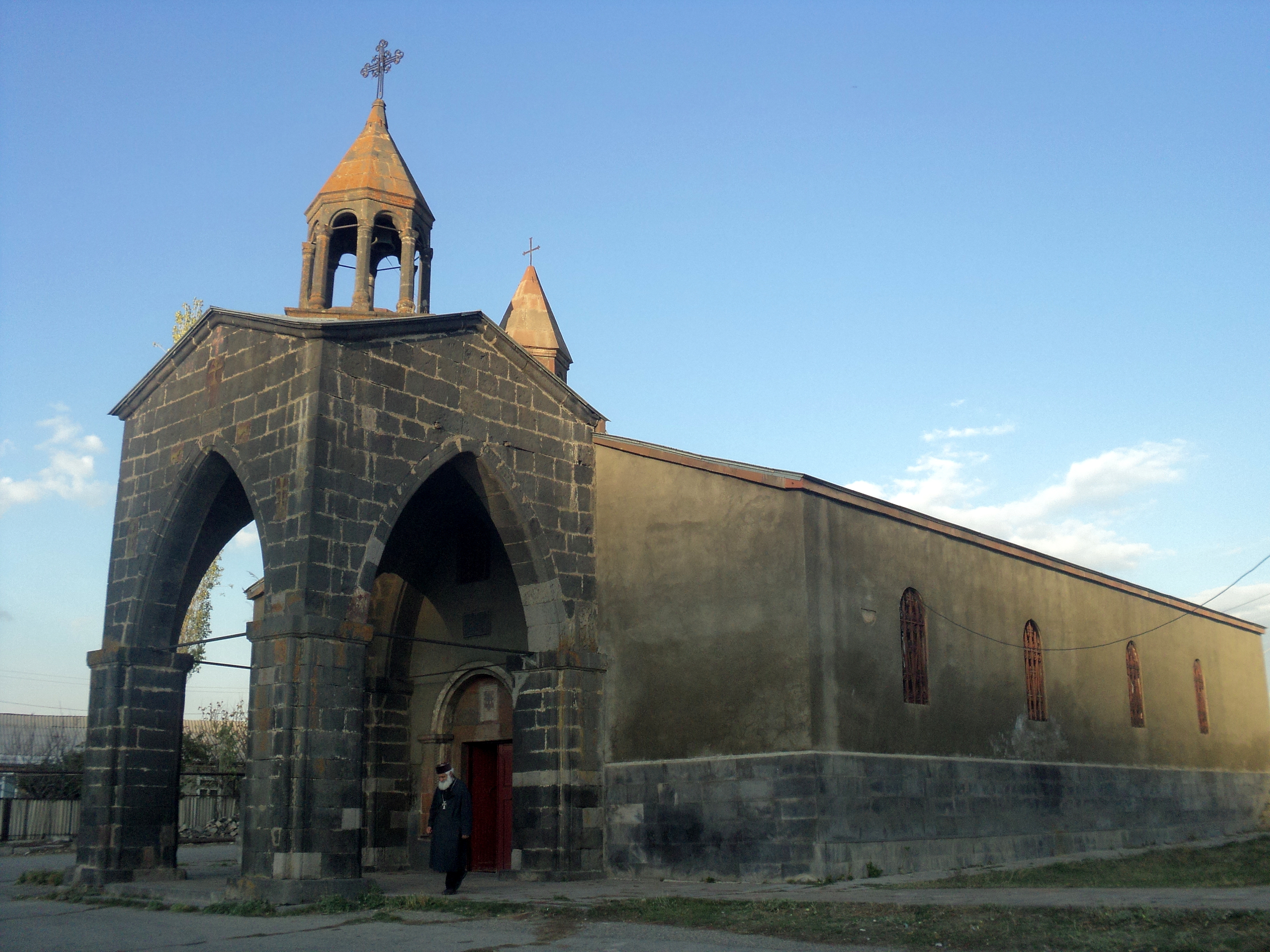
Holy Mother of God Church, Hrazdan, 1883

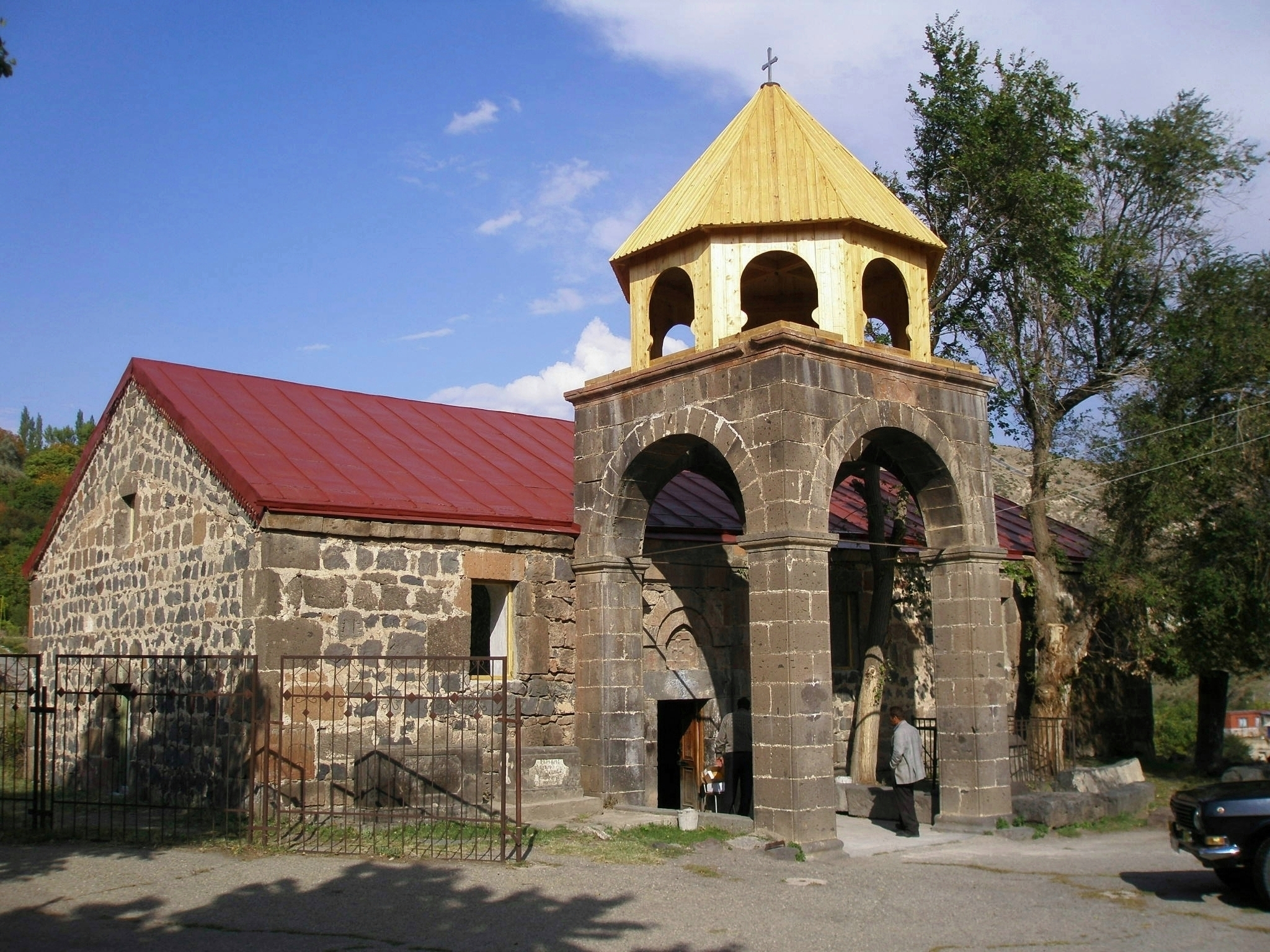
Saint George's Church, Argel, 1890

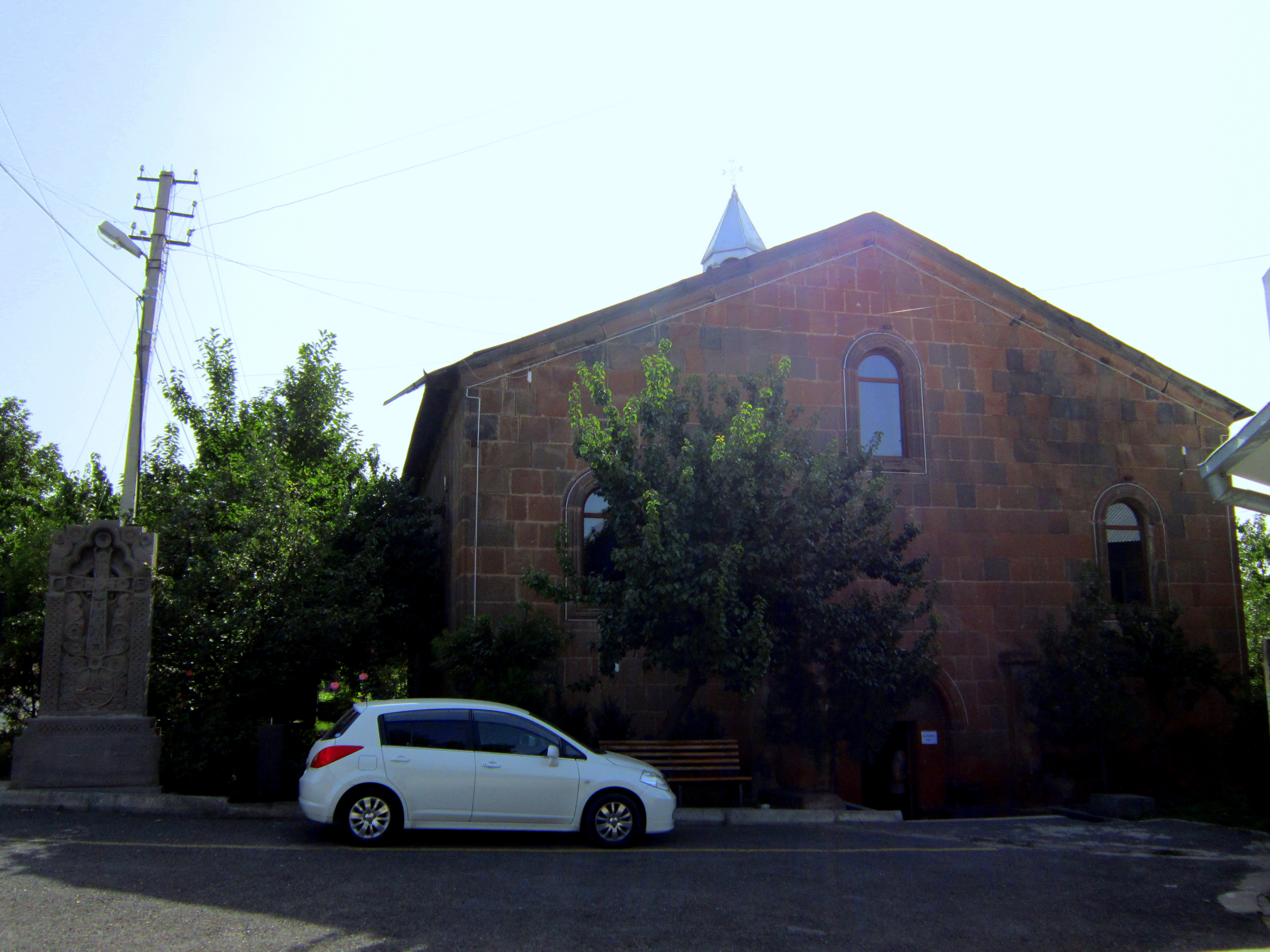
Surp Hovhannes Church, Arinj, 1890

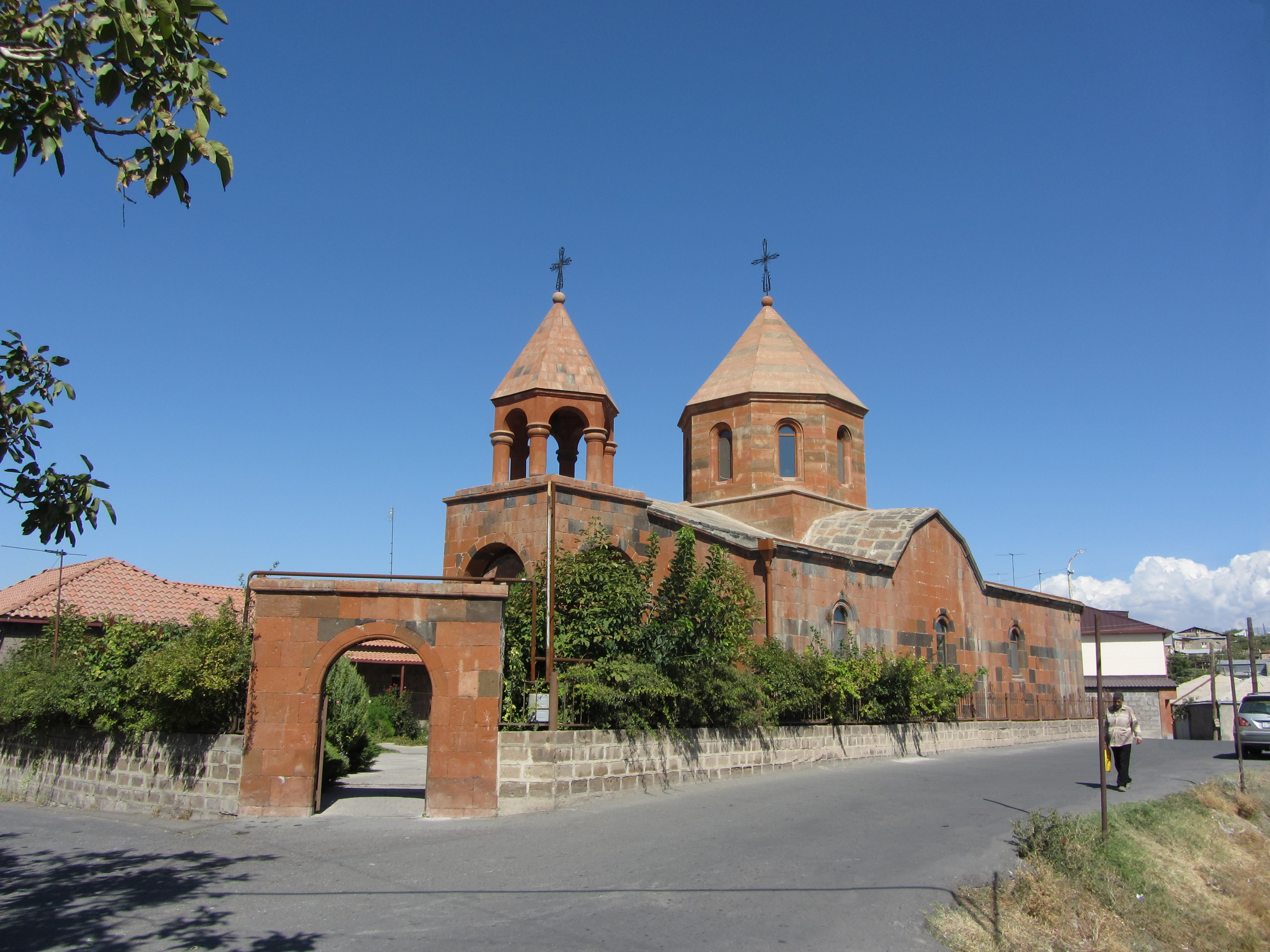
Holy Mother of God Church, Jrvezh, 1891

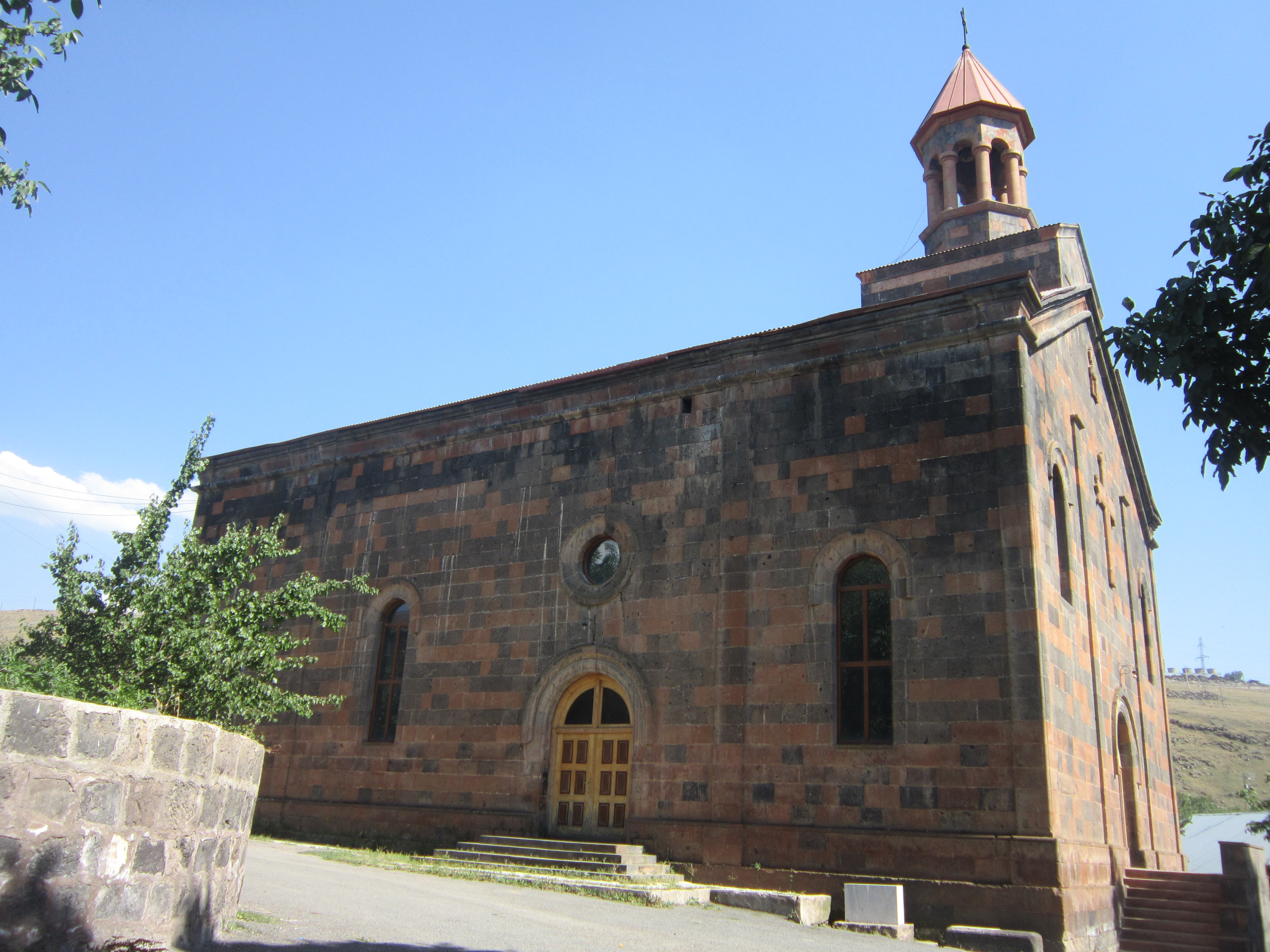
Holy Mother of God Church, Alapars, 1897

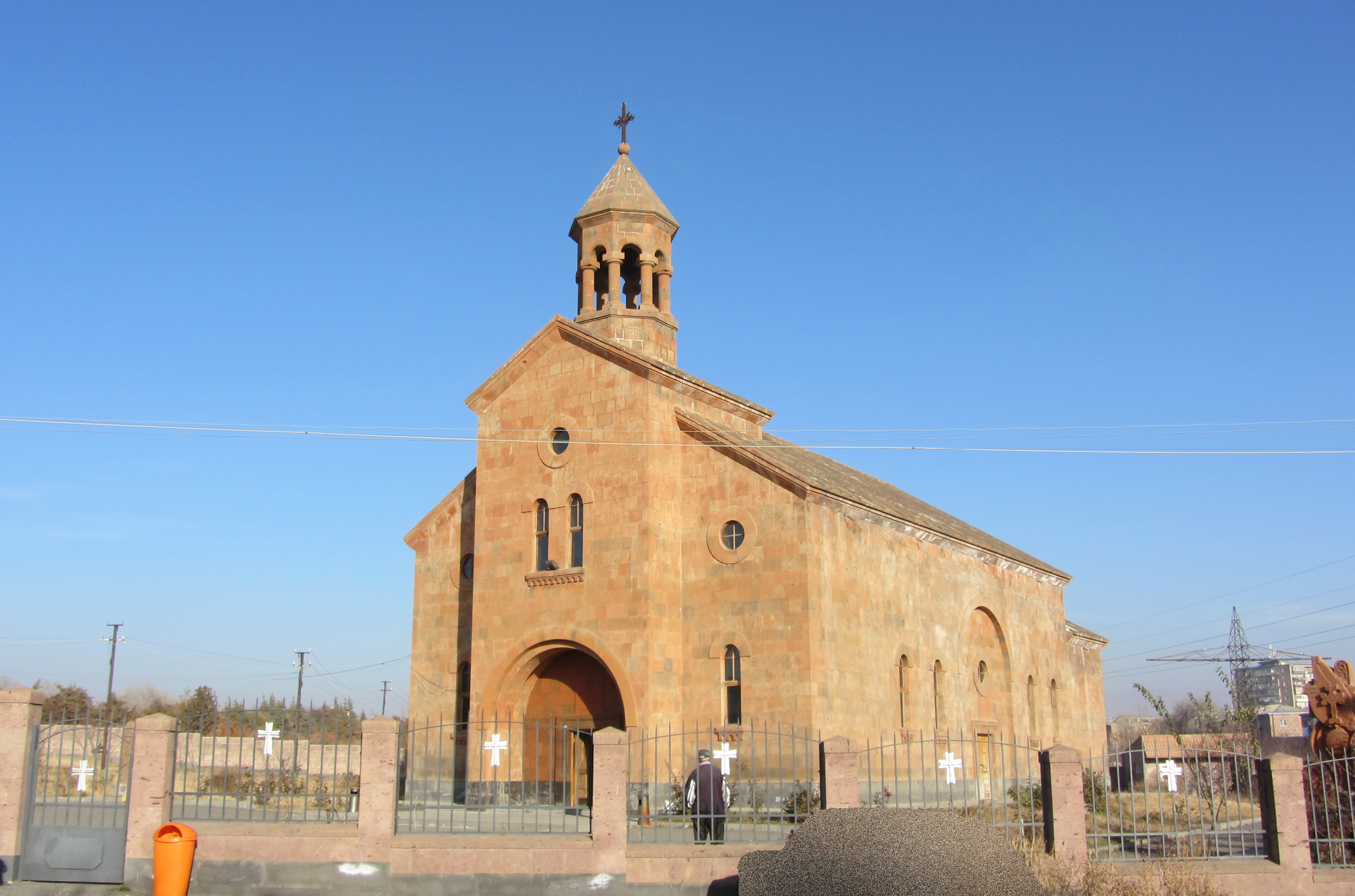
Holy Saviour's Church, Charentsavan, 2000

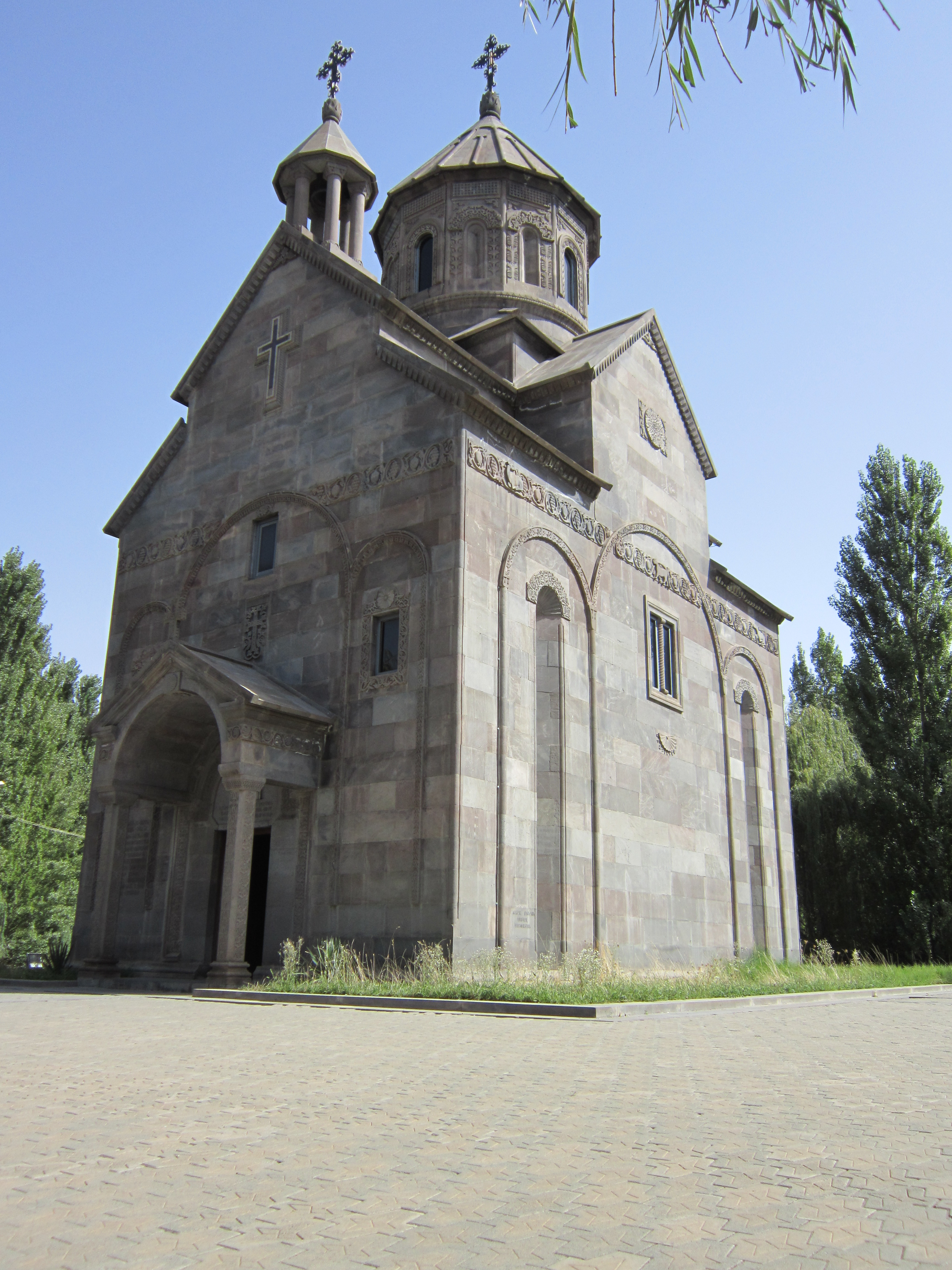
Holy Mother of God Church, Arinj, 2002

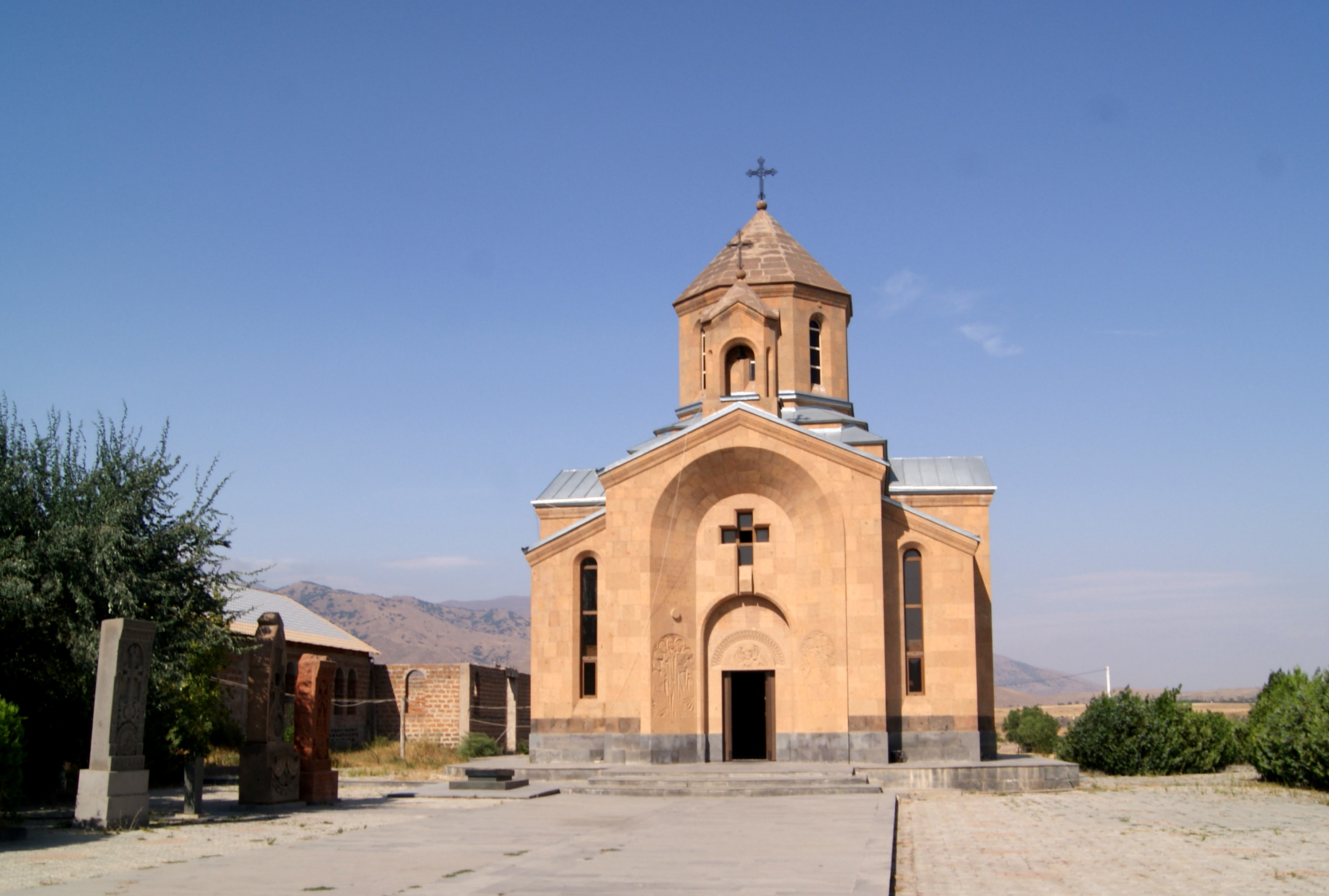
Holy Martyrs Church, Teghenik, 2003

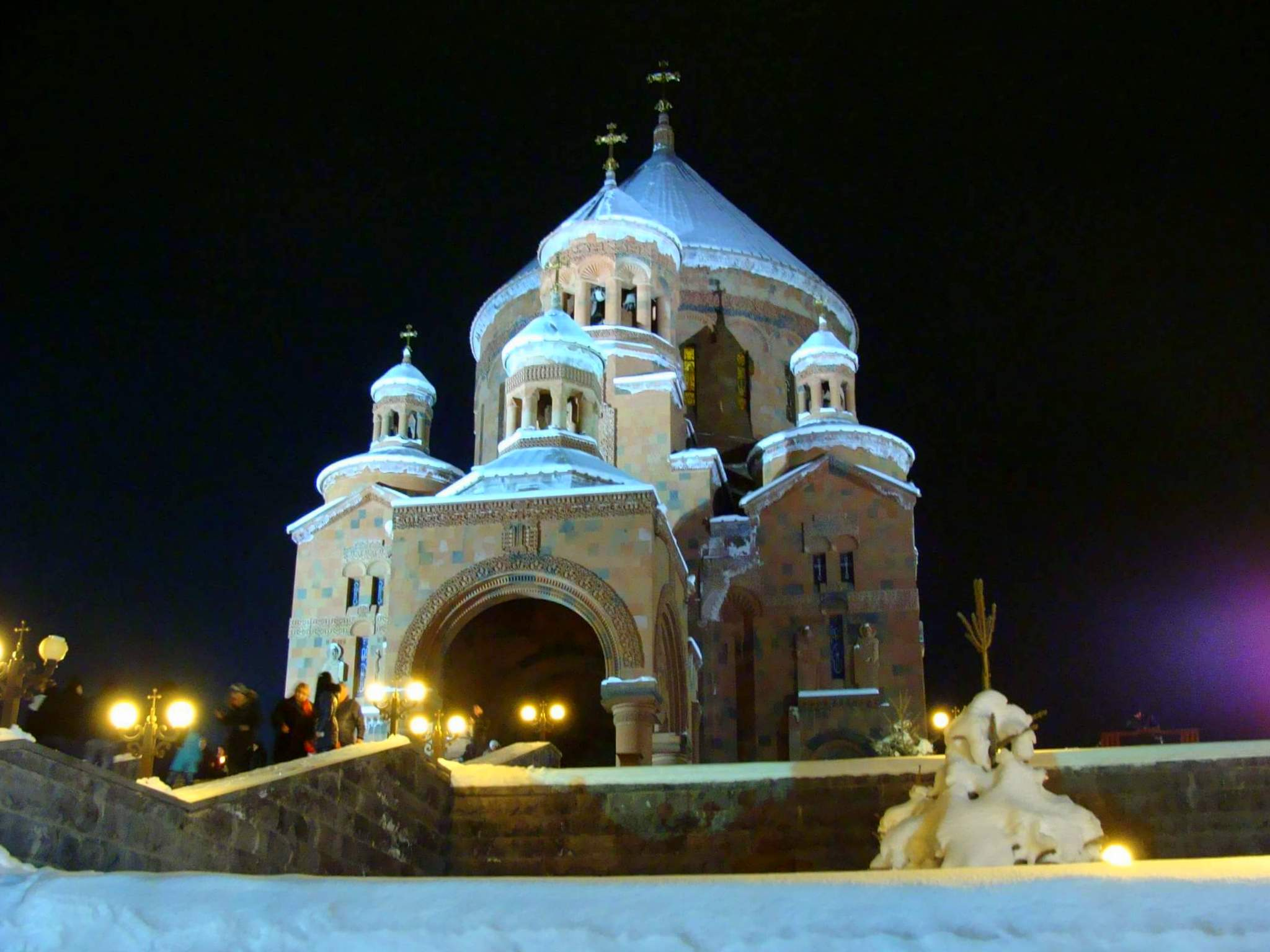
Saint John the Baptist Church, Abovyan, 2013

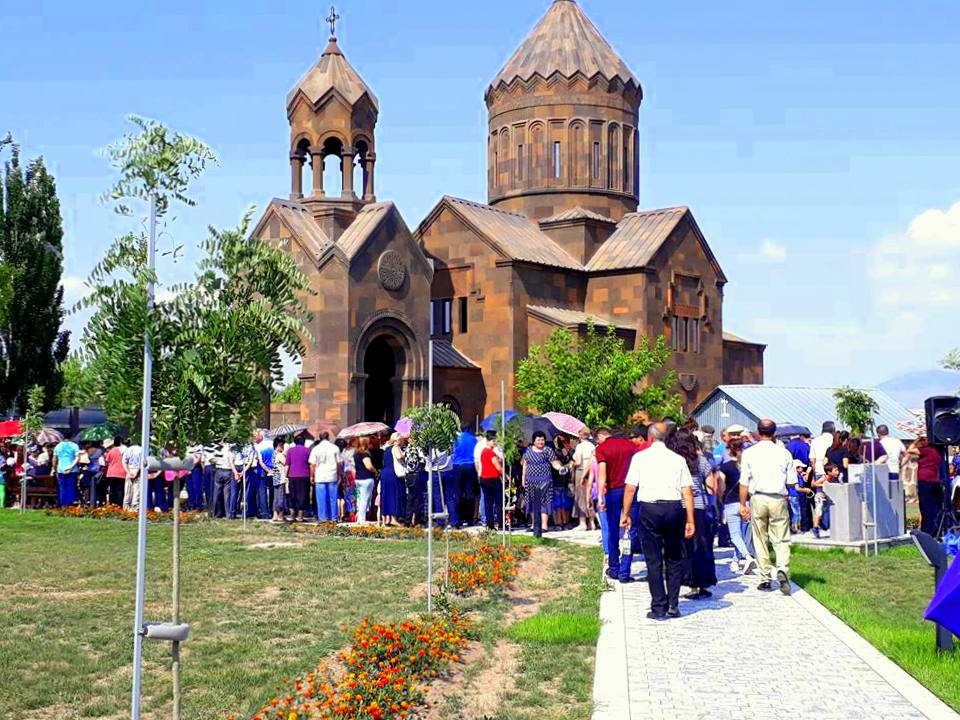
Surp Sarkis Church, Yeghvard, 2017

=== Monasteries ===
- Geghard Monastery near Goght, 4th century, with the Katoghike Chapel dating back to 1215
- Dzagavank Monastery near Getargel, consisted of 2 churches: Surp Nshan Church of the 7the century, and the belfry chapel of the 14th century
- Makravank Monastery, Hrazdan, consisted of 2 churches: the Holy Saviour's Church of the 10th century and the Holy Mother of God Church of the 13th century
- Kecharis Monastery, Tsaghkadzor, consisted of 3 churches and 2 chapels: Saint Grigor Church of 1013, Surp Nshan Church of the 11th century, Katoghike Church of the 13th century, Chapel of Saint Grigor of the 11th century, and the Chapel of Surp Harutyun of 1220
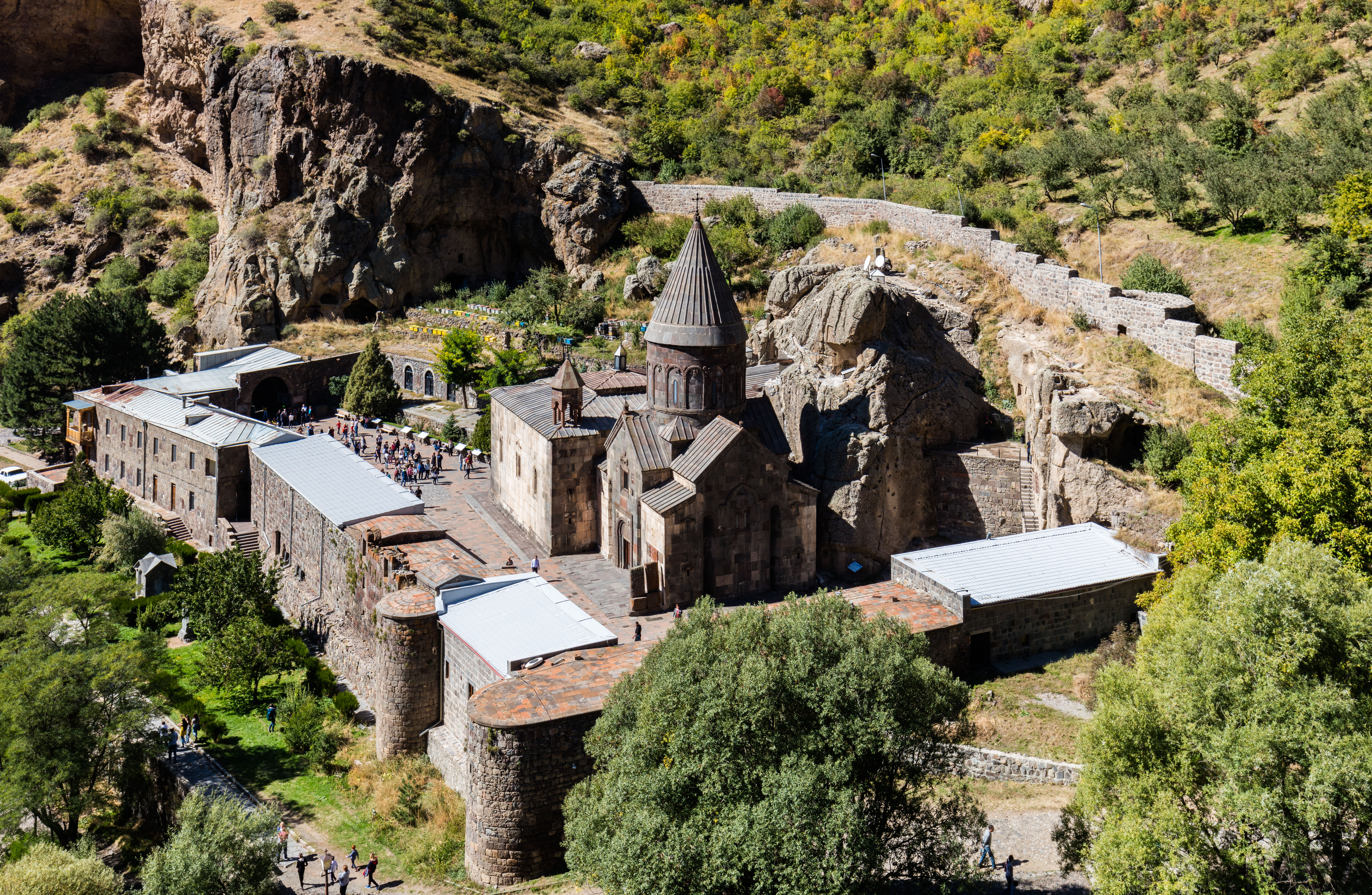
Geghard Monastery near Goght, 4-13th centuries

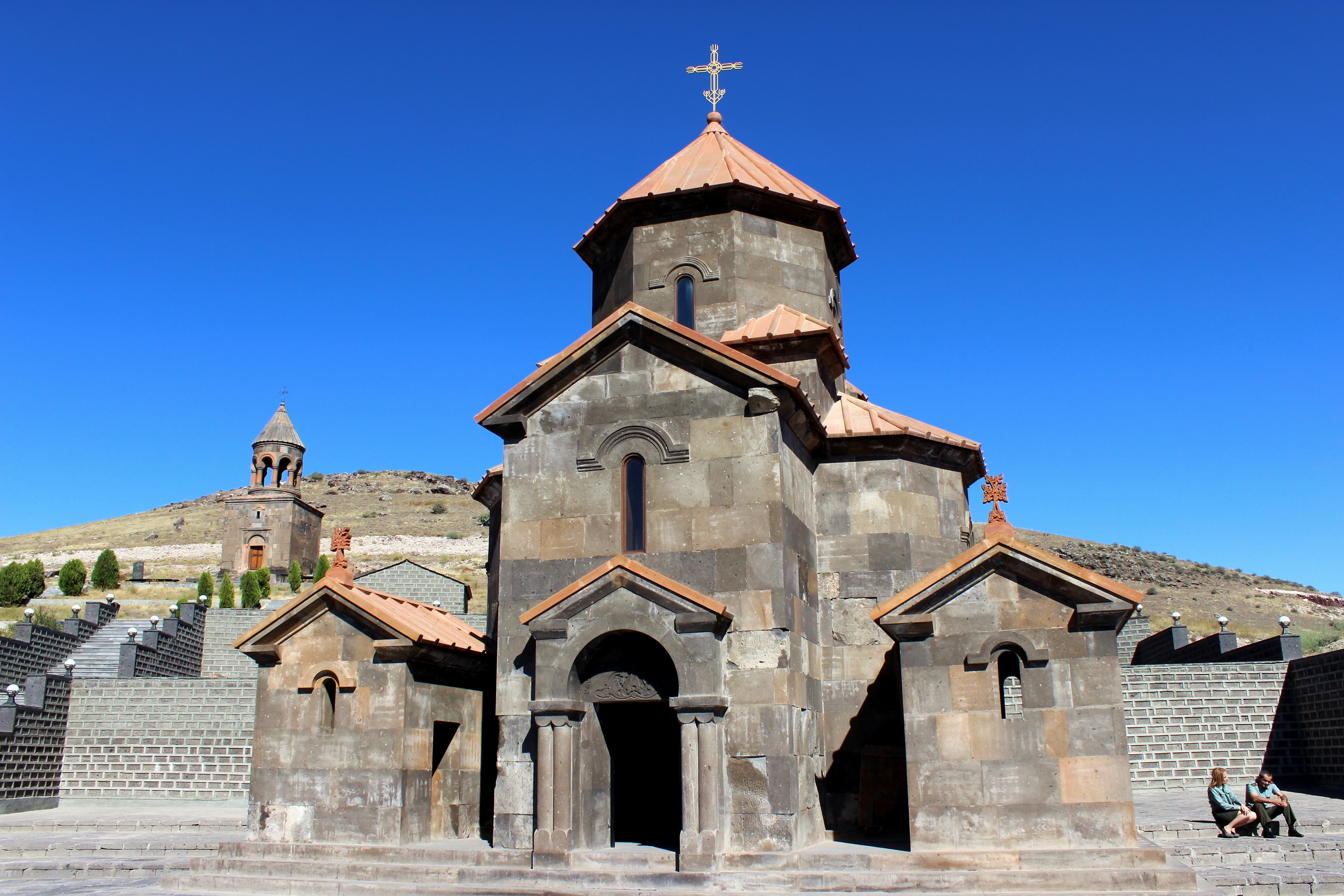
Dzagavank Monastery near Getargel, 7-14th centuries

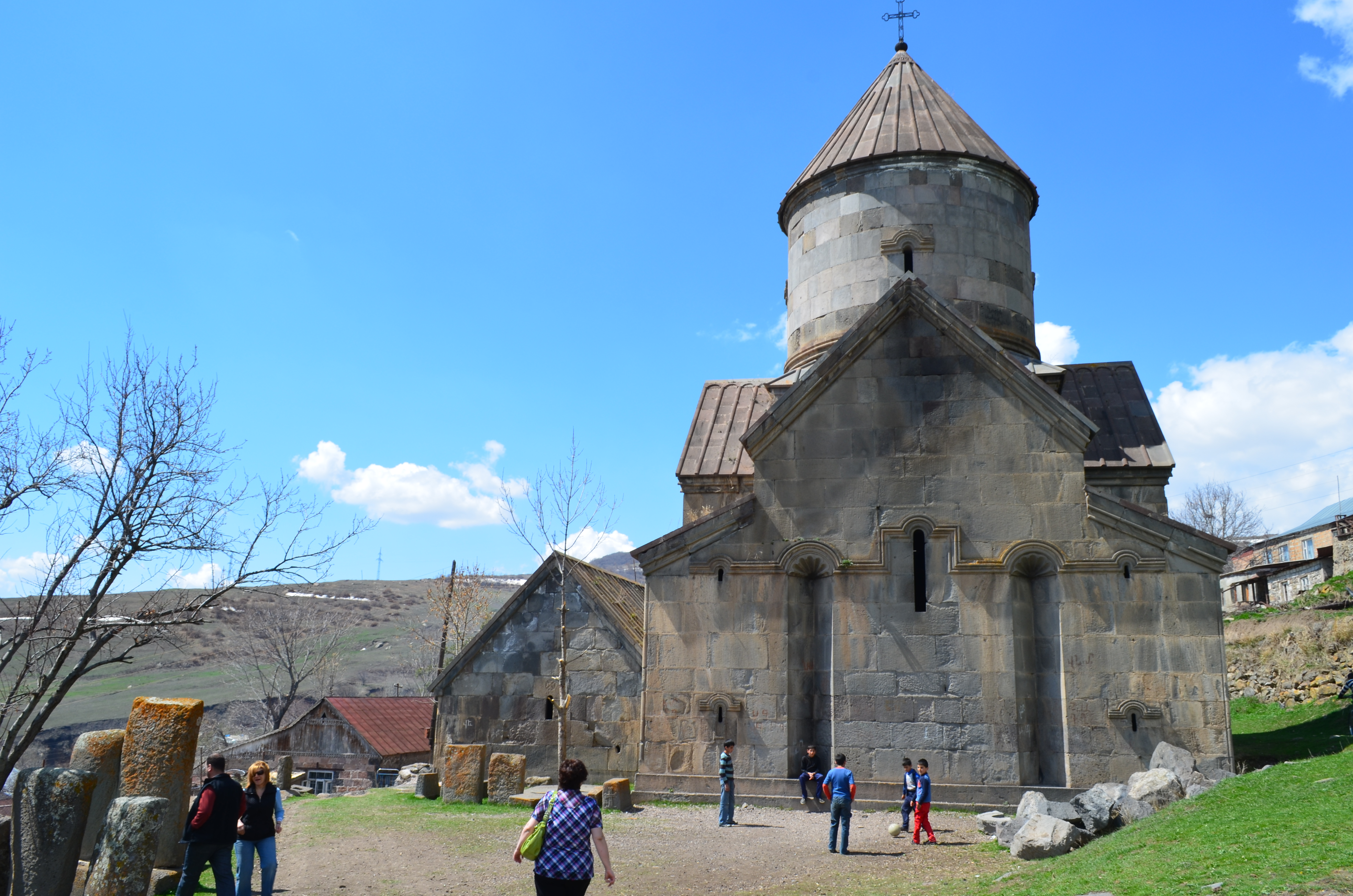
Makravank Monastery, Hrazdan, 10-13th centuries

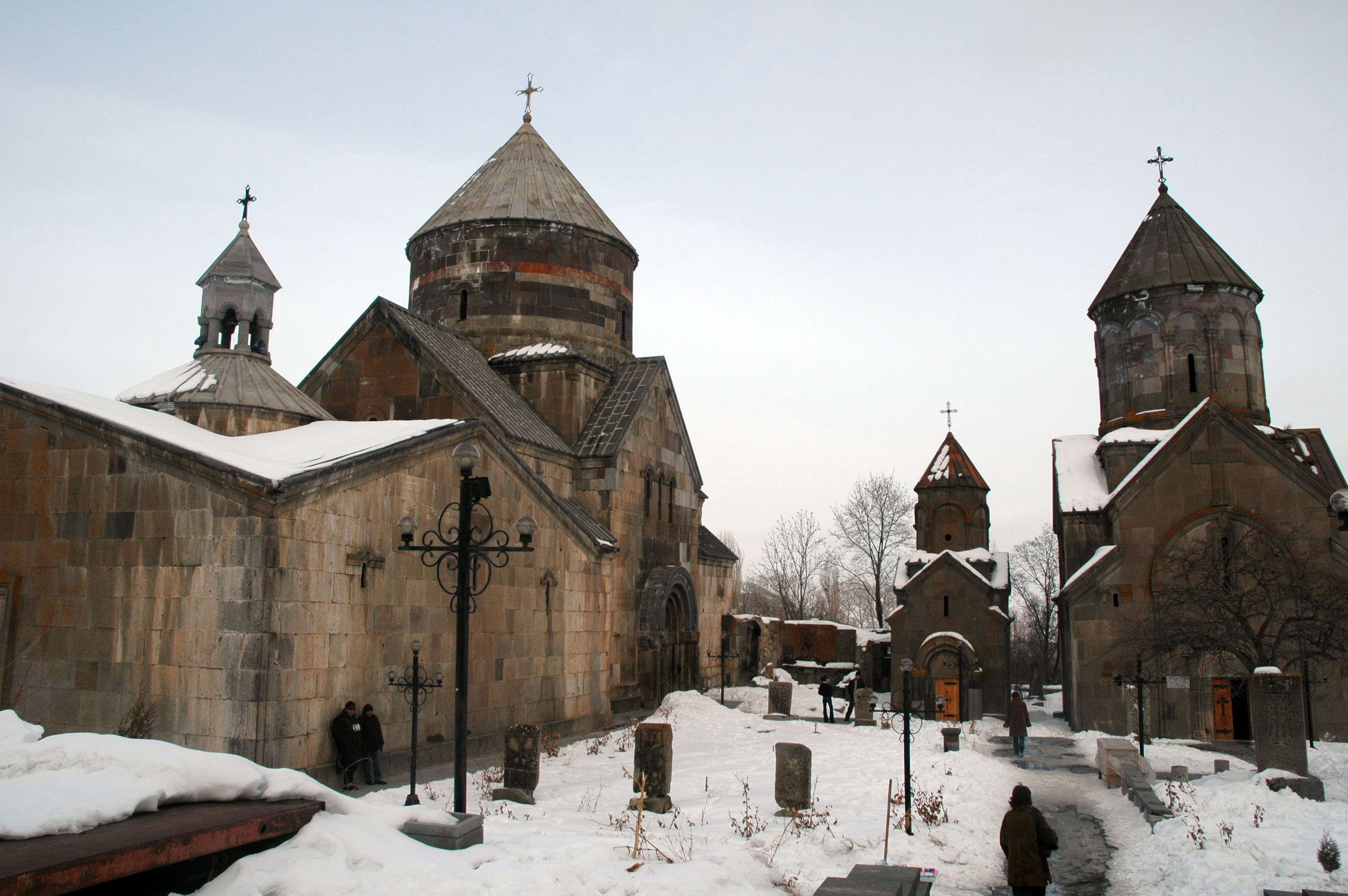
Kecharis Monastery, 11-13th centuries

=== Chapels ===
- Tsaghkevank Chapel, Teghenik, 7-8th centuries
- Karmravor Chapel, Arinj, 13th century
- Tukh Manuk Chapel, Arinj, 13th century
- Holy Mother of God Chapel, Aramus, 13-14th centuries
- Holy Mother of God Chapel, Arinj, 15th century
- Tukh Manuk Chapel, Alapars, 19th century
- Surp Karapet Chapel, Arinj, 20th century
- Blue Cross Chapel, Hrazdan, 1996
- Saint Barbara's Chapel, Balahovit, 1999
- Saint Vartan Chapel, Byureghavan, 2000
- Holy Cross Chapel, Ptghni, 2005
- Surp Narek Chapel, Kotayk, 2006
- Saint Gregory Chapel, Zar, 2008
- Holy Mother of God Chapel, Dzoraghbyur, 2010
- Tukh Manuk Chapel, Argel, 2013
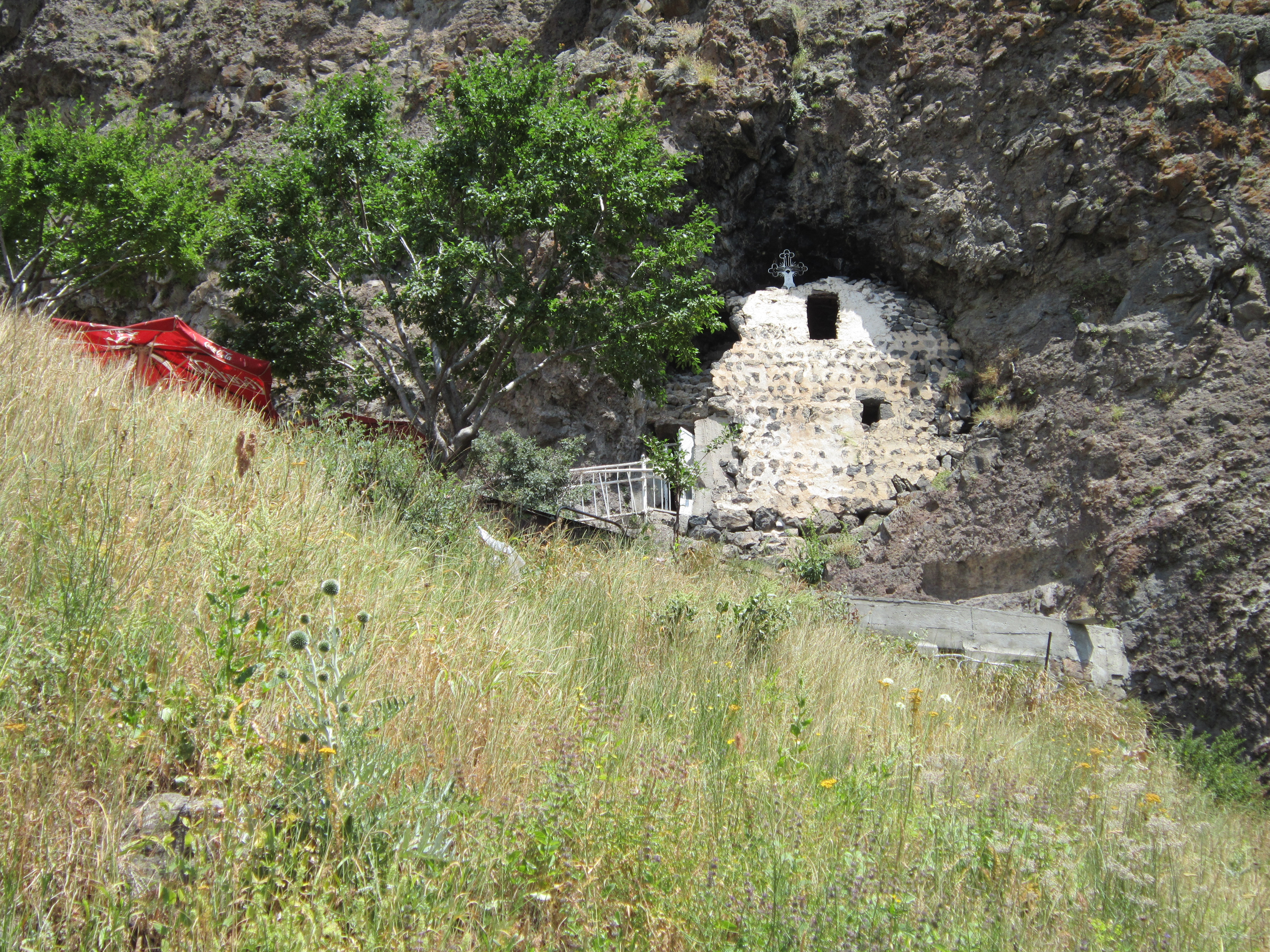
Tsaghkevank Chapel, Teghenik, 7-8th centuries

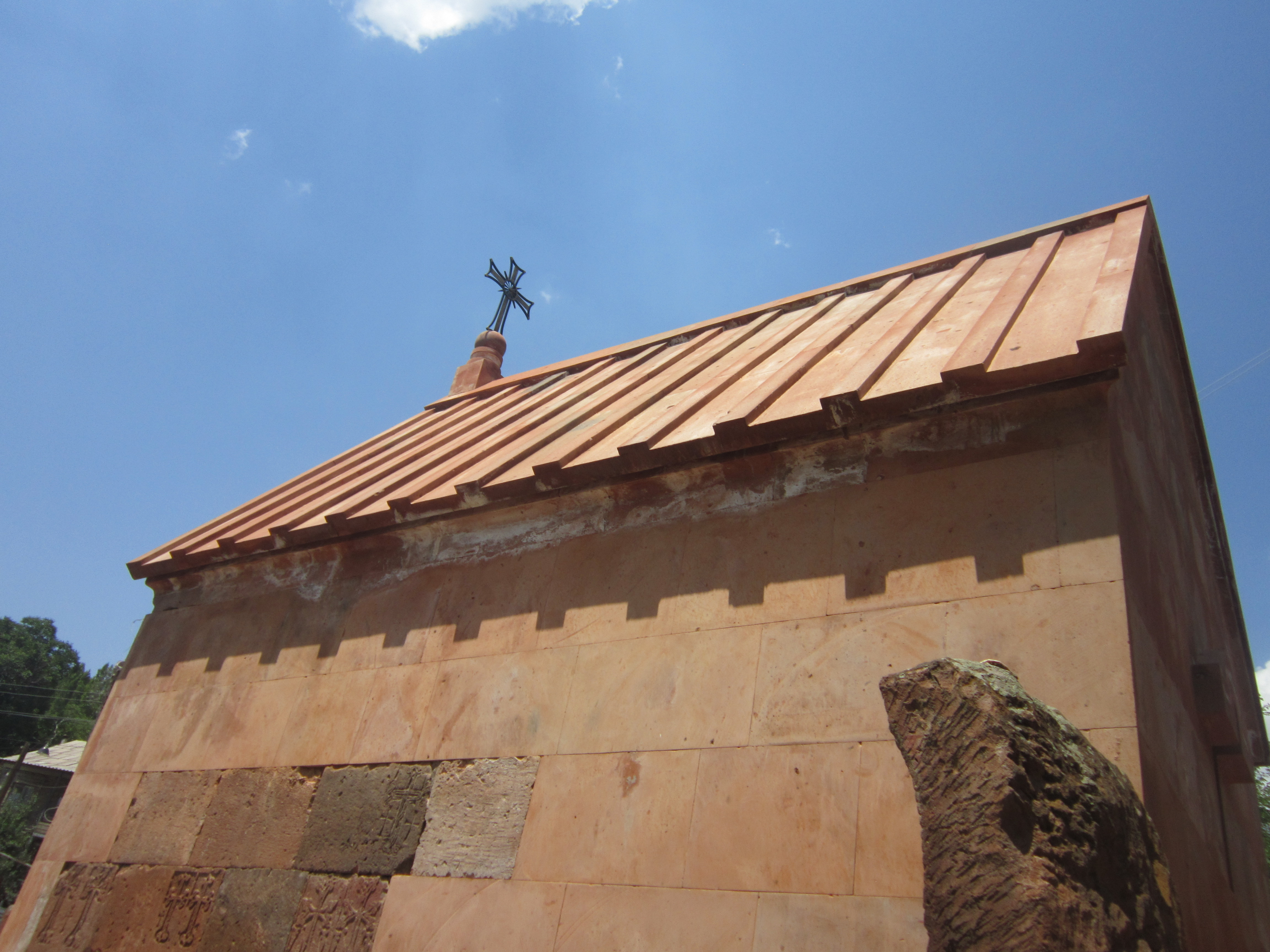
Karmravor Chapel, Arinj, 13th century

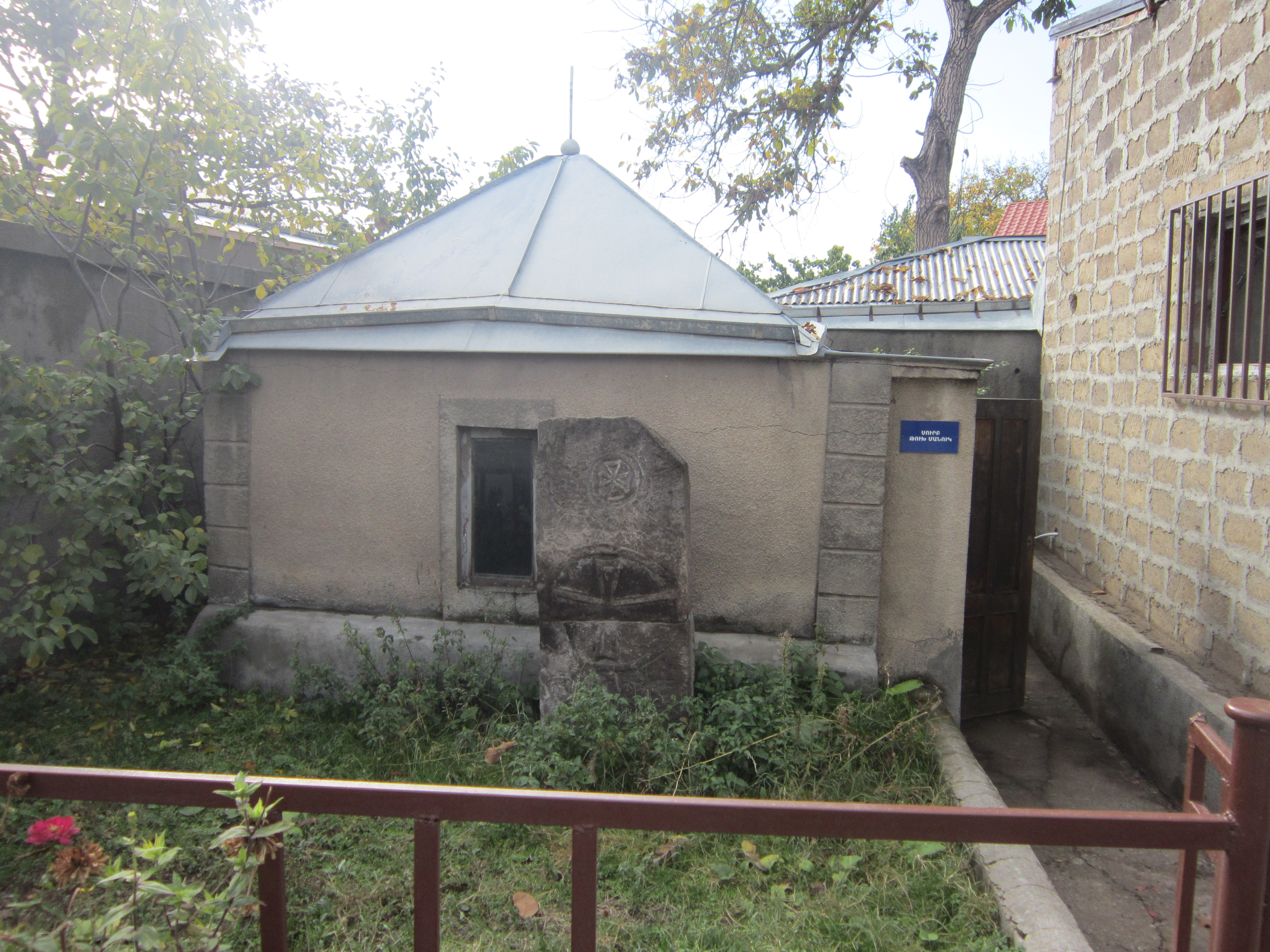
Tukh Manuk Chapel, Arinj, 13th century

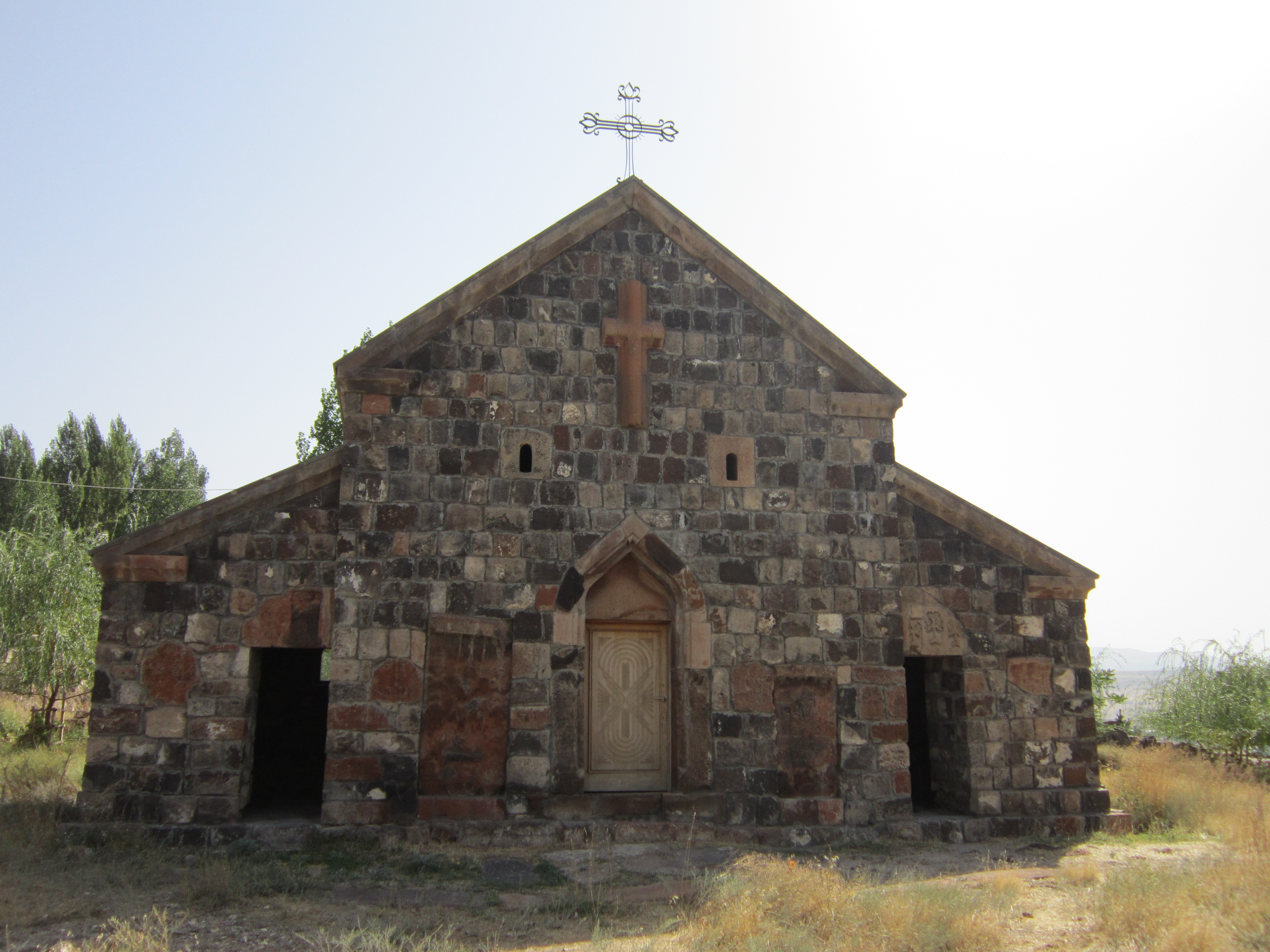
Holy Mother of God Chapel, Arinj, 15th century

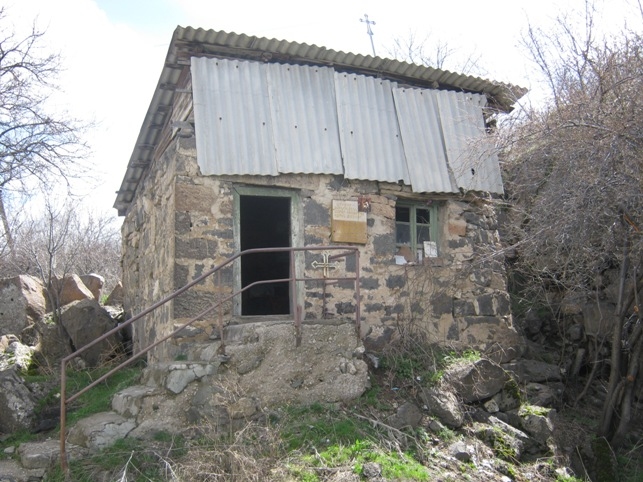
Tukh Manuk Chapel, Alapars, 19th century

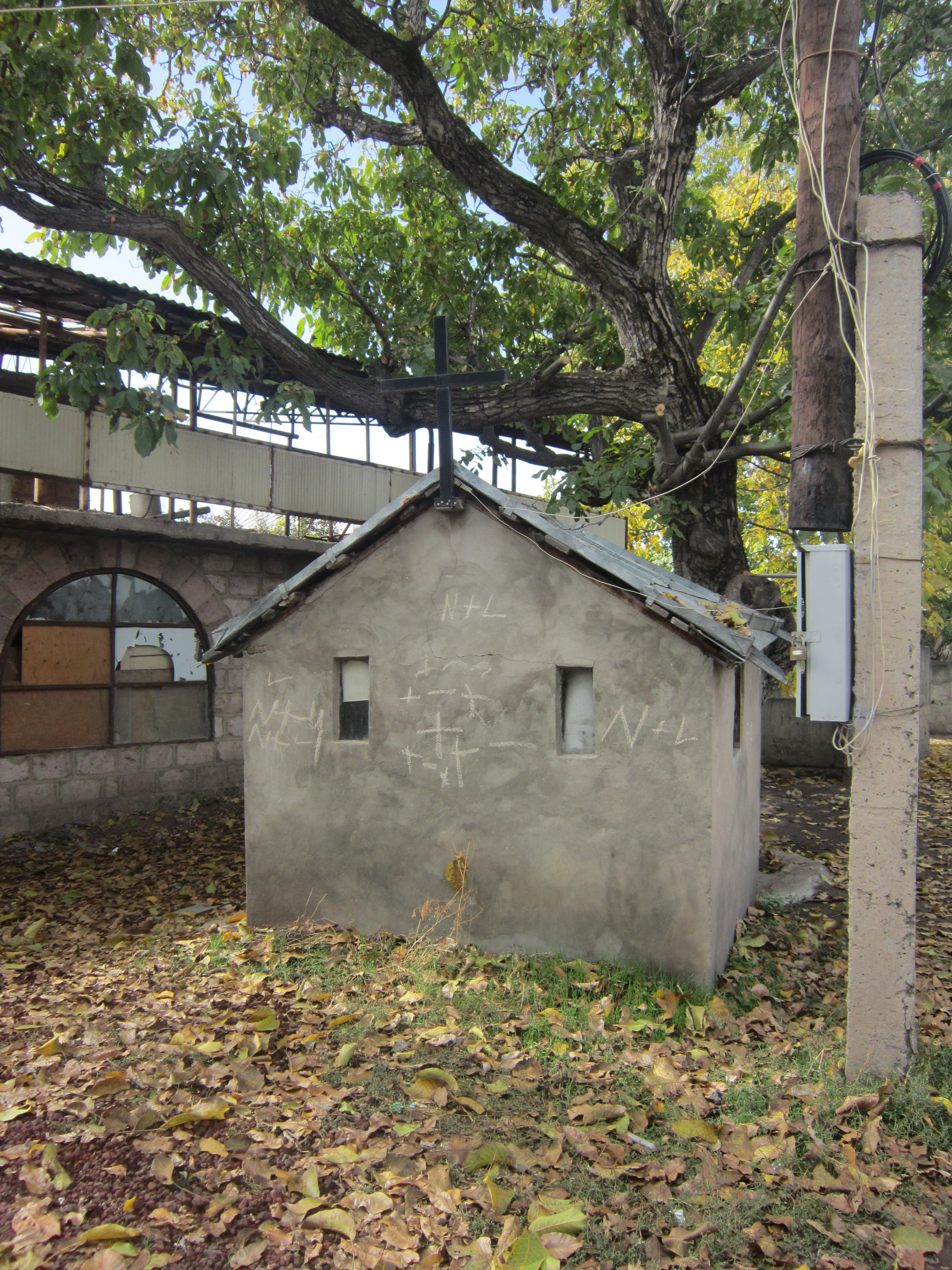
Surp Karapet Chapel, Arinj, 20th century

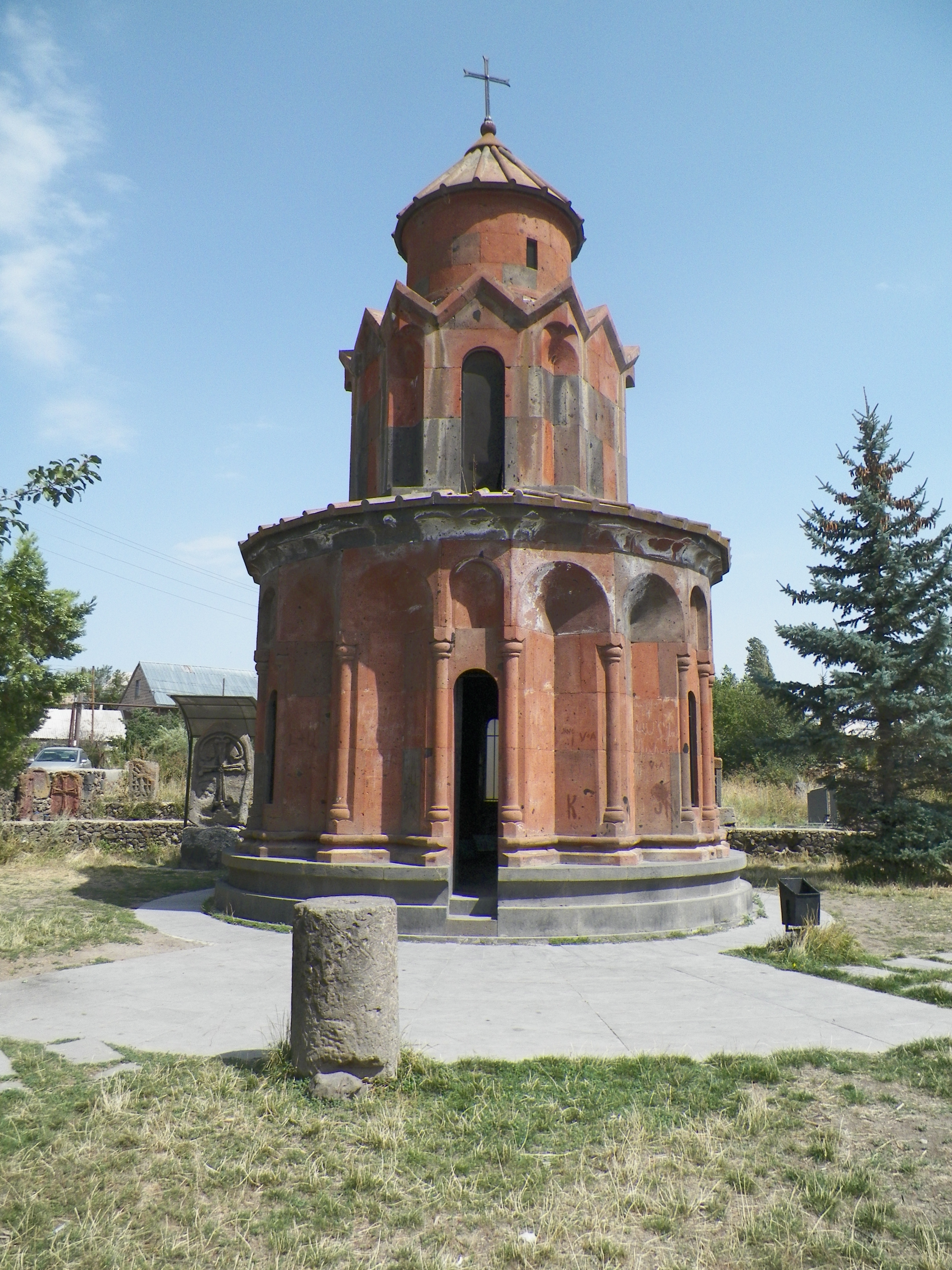
Blue Cross Chapel, Hrazdan, 1996

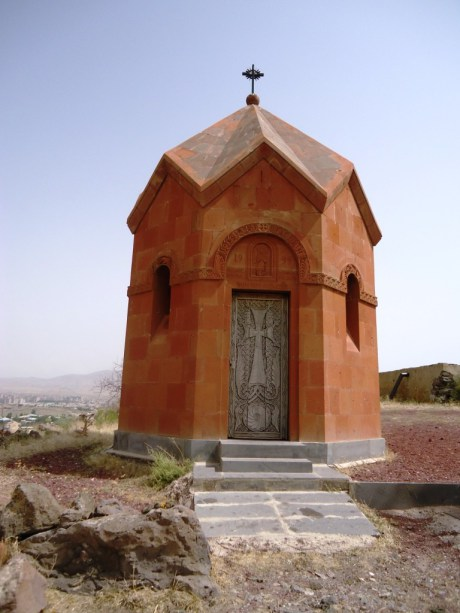
Saint Barbara's Chapel, Balahovit, 1999

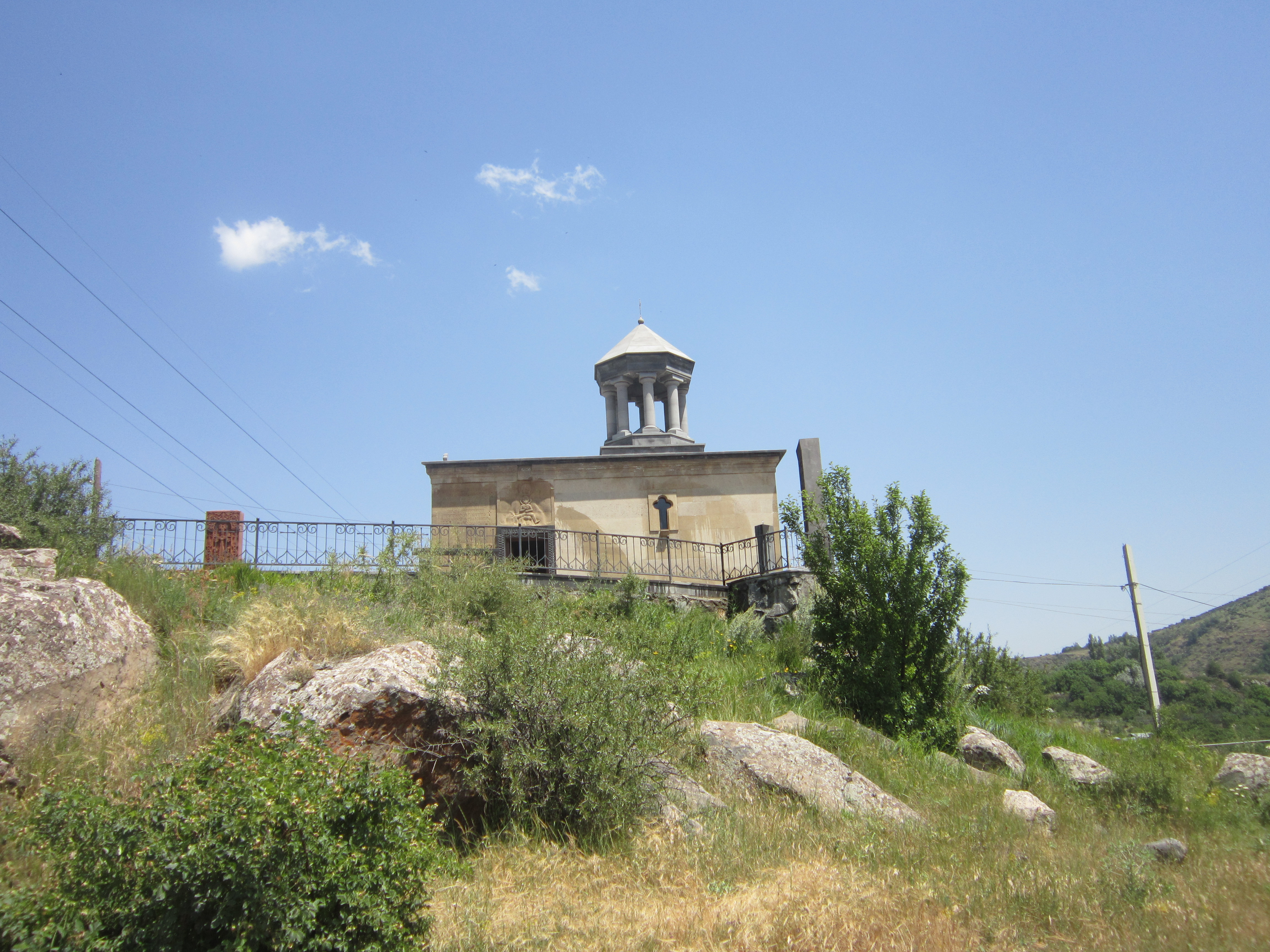
Tukh Manuk Chapel, Argel, 2013

== Inactive/ruined churches and monasteries ==
This is an incomplete list of inactive or ruined churches and monasteries in the territory regulated by the Diocese of Kotayk:

- Yeghvard Basilica, Yeghvard, 4th century
- Khumarazham Church, Garni, 4-5th centuries
- Kakavadzor Upper Chapel, Hrazdan, 4-7th centuries
- Surp Nshan Tsiranavor Church, Aramus, 6th century
- Ptghnavank Monastery, Ptghni, 6-7th centuries
- Monastery of the Apostles Matthew and Andrew, Karenis, 6-7th centuries
- Artavaz Monastery, Artavaz, 6-7th centuries
- Teghenyats Monastery, Buzhakan, 6-7th centuries
- Gharghavank Church, Zoravan, 7th century
- Saint George's Monastery near Argel, 7th century
- Holy Zion Church, Garni, 7th century
- Mayravank Monastery, Solak, 7-11th century
- Holy Cross Church, Bjni, 9th century
- Surp Stepanos Church of Aghbyurak, Hrazdan, 10-12th centuries
- Neghuts Monastery, Arzakan, 10-13th centuries
- Holy Right Monastery, Hrazdan, 10-14th centuries
- Tejharuyk Monastery, Meghradzor, 1199
- Monastery of Saints Paul and Peter, Akunk, 12-13th centuries
- Holy Mother of God Church, Garni, 12-13th centuries
- Chorut Monastery, Arzakan, 1207
- Zoravan Church, Zoravan, 13th century
- Saint George's Church, Bjni, 13th century
- Saint George's Church, Arzakan, 13-14th century
- Kakavadzor Chapel, Hrazdan, 18-19th centuries
- Surp Karapet Church of Jrarat, Hrazdan, 1831
- Surp Stepanos Church, Arzakan, 1867
- Holy Mother of God Church, Goght, 19th century
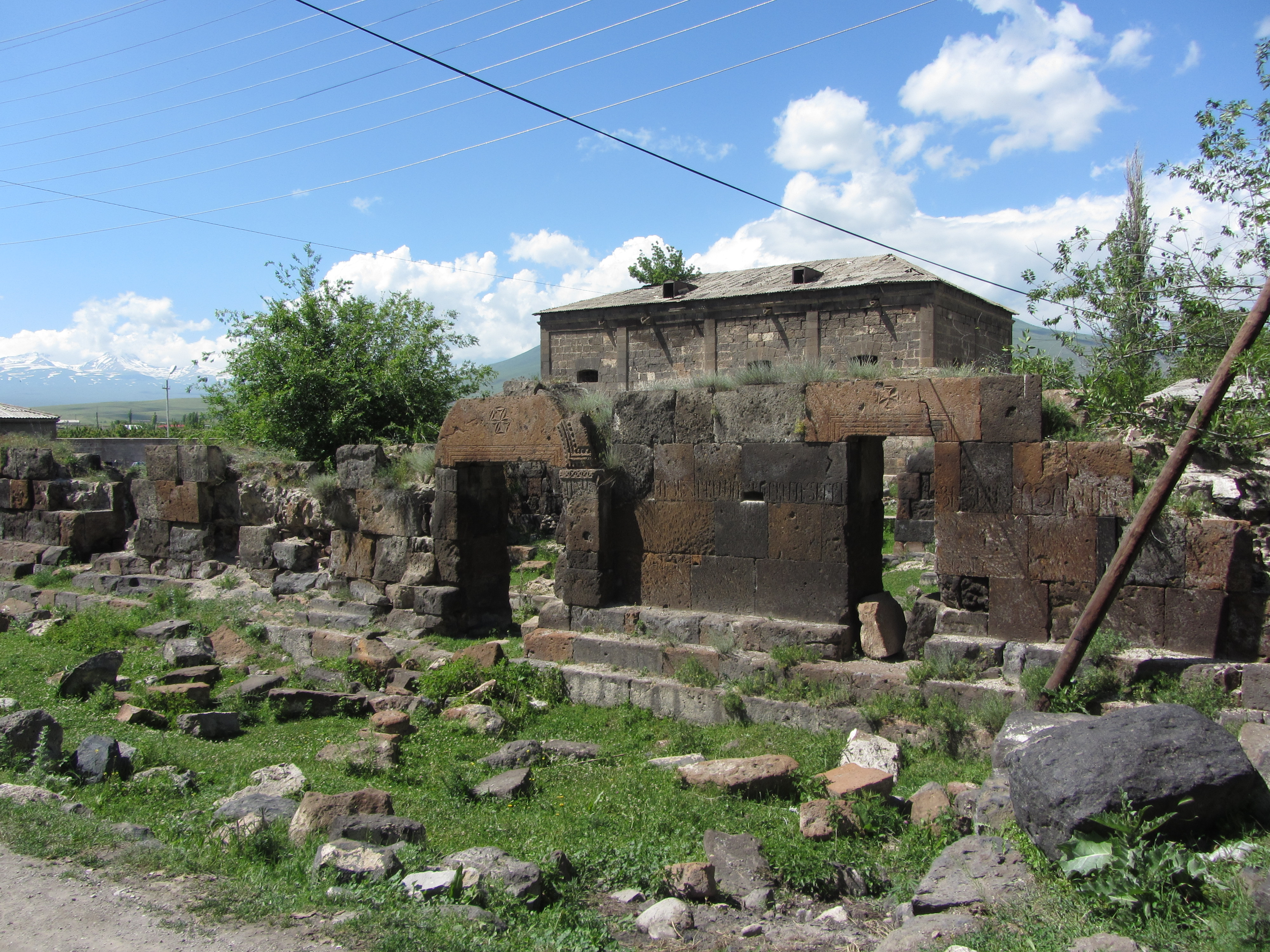
Yeghvard Basilica, Yeghvard, 4th century

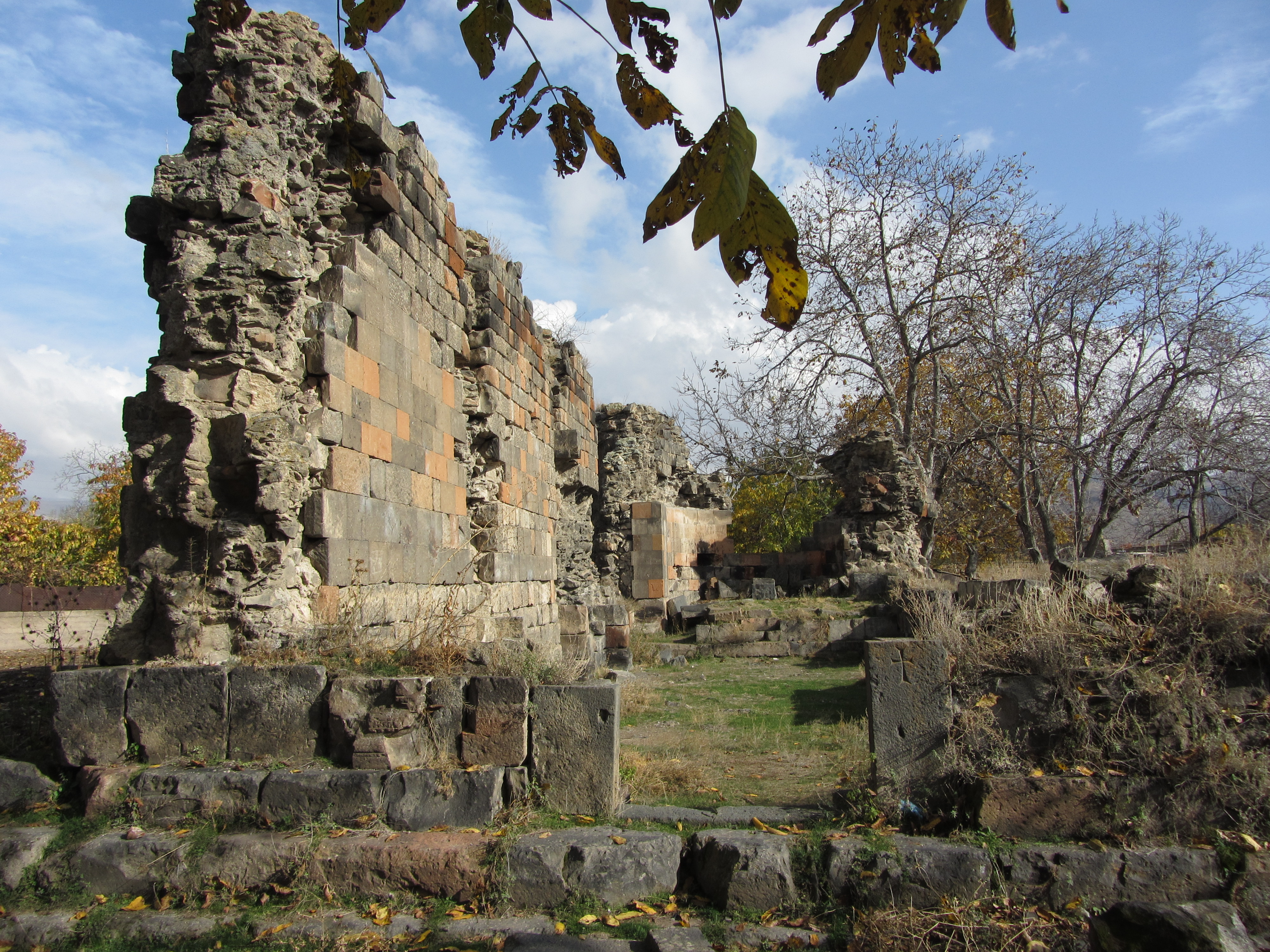
Khumarazham Church, Garni, 4-5th centuries

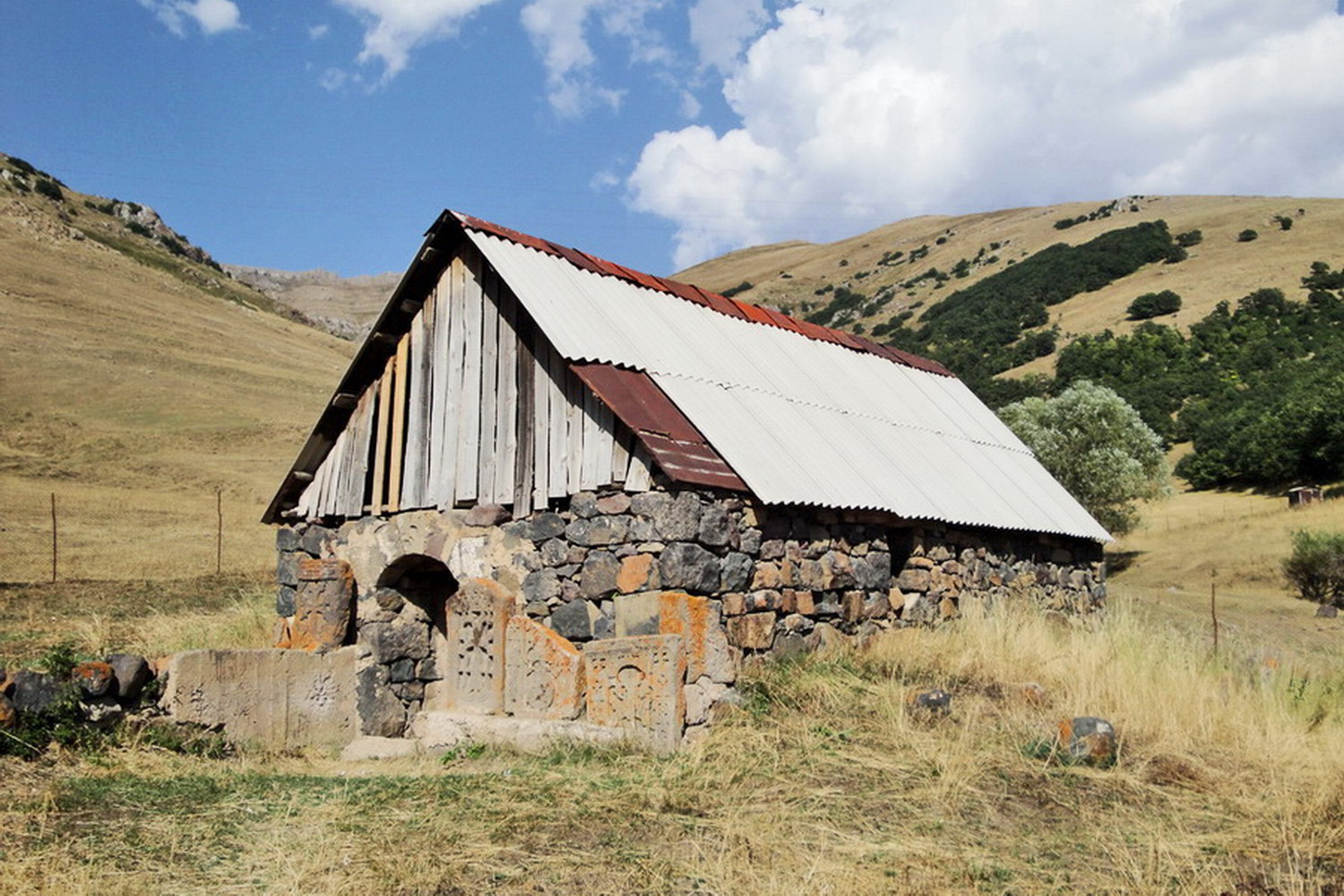
Kakavadzor Upper Chapel, Hrazdan, 4-7th centuries

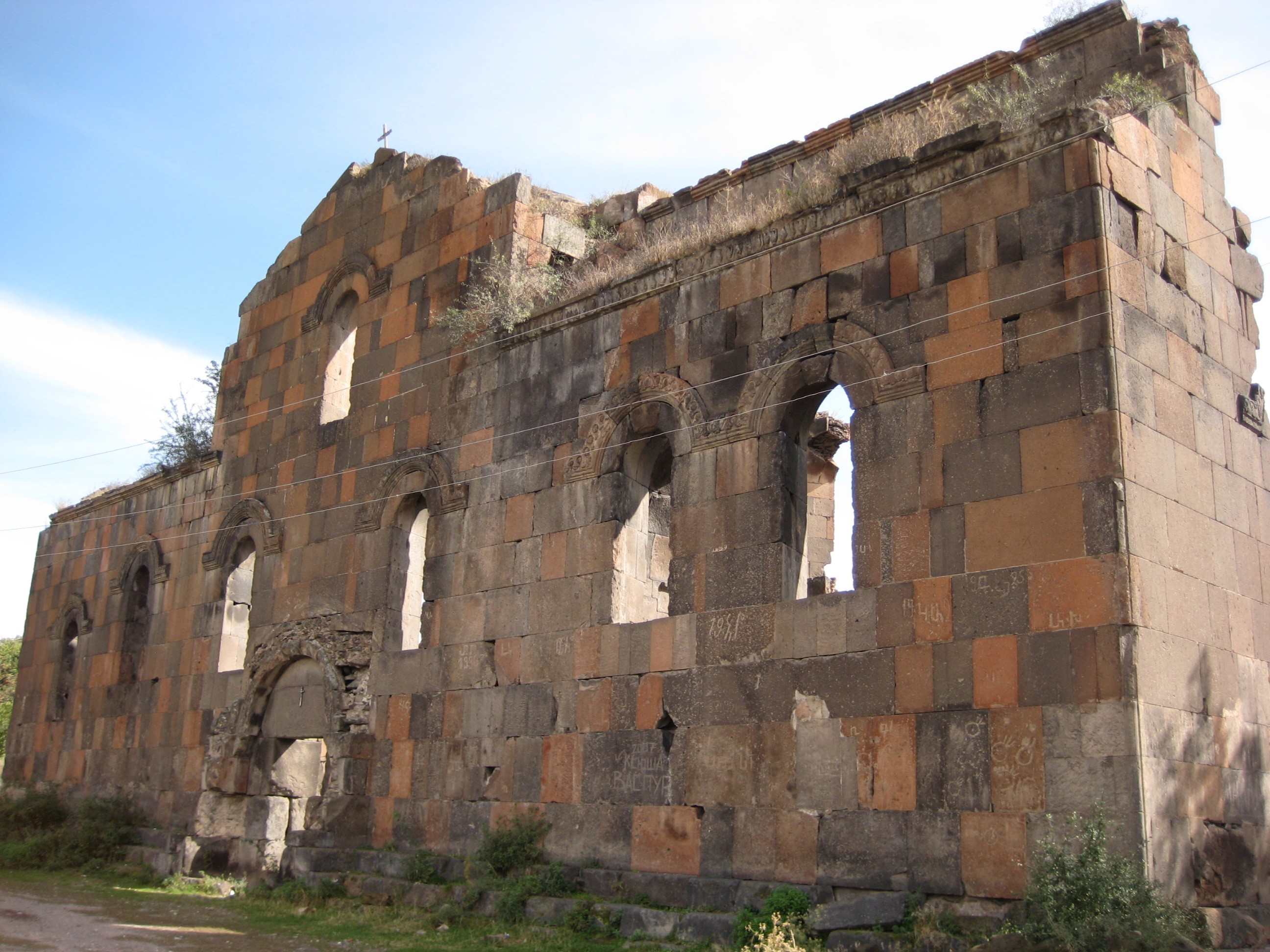
Ptghnavank Monastery, Ptghni, 6-7th centuries

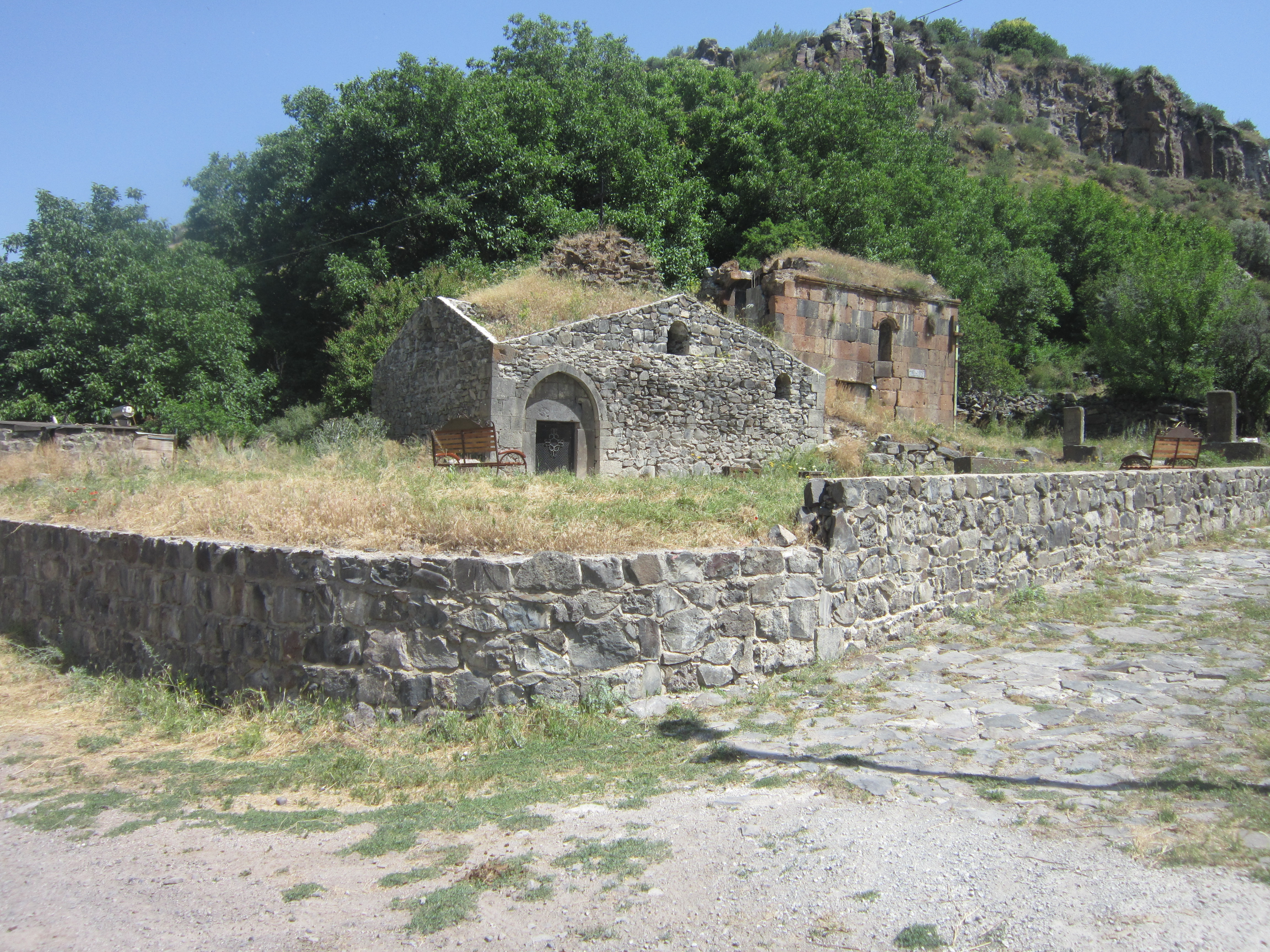
Monastery of the Apostles Matthew and Andrew, Karenis, 6-7th centuries

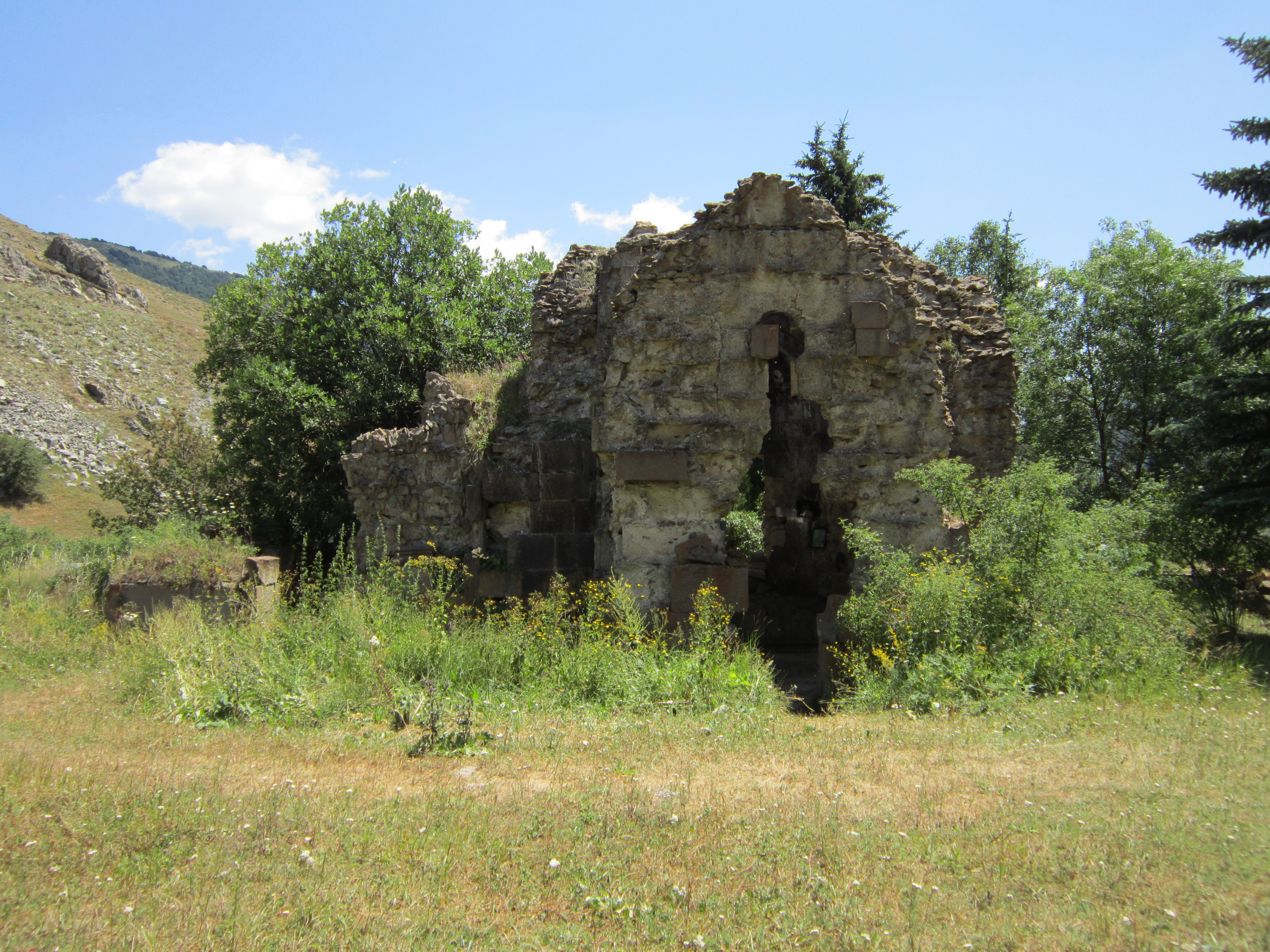
Artavaz Monastery, Artavaz, 6-7th centuries

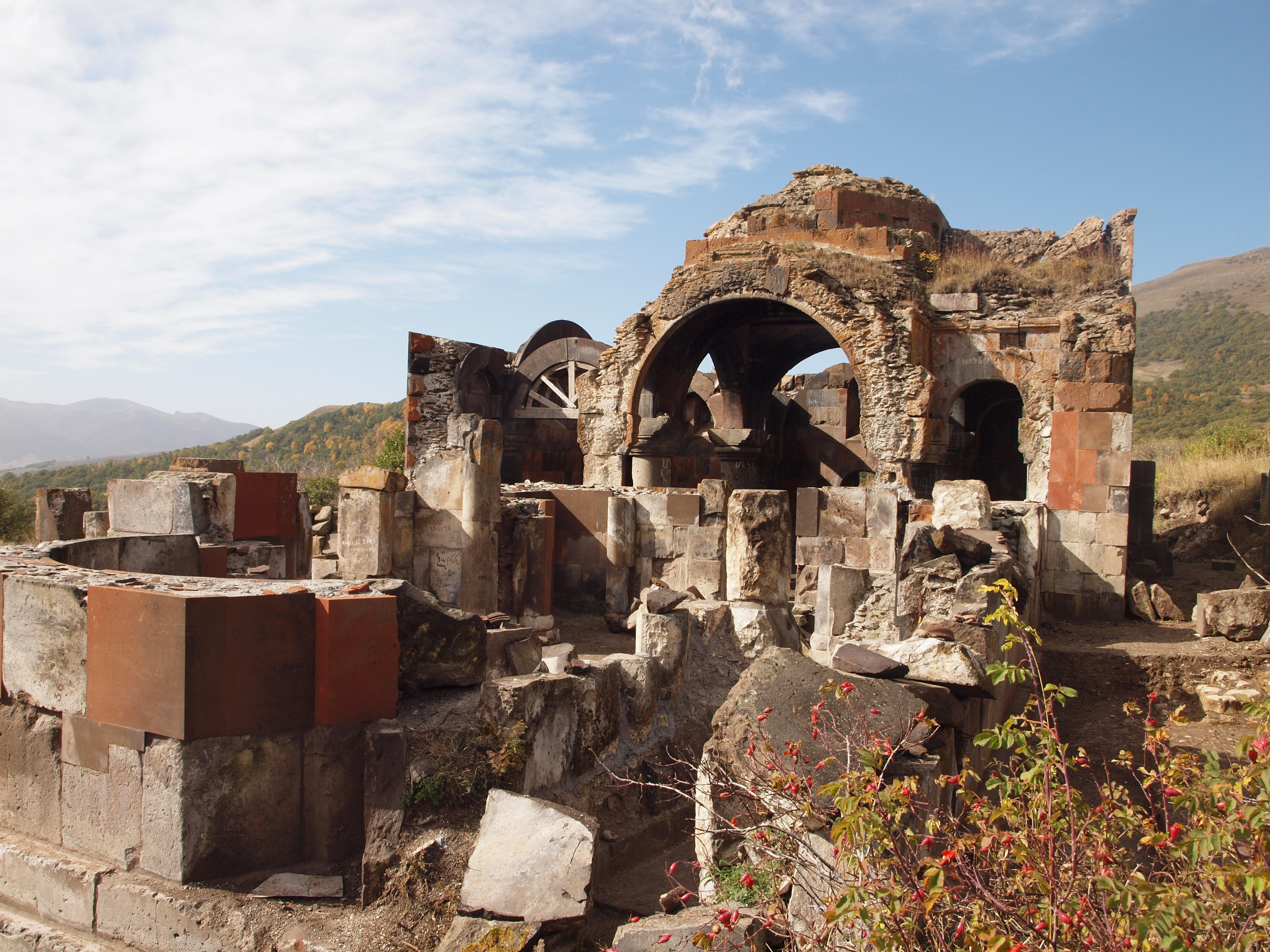
Teghenyats Monastery, Buzhakan, 6-7th centuries

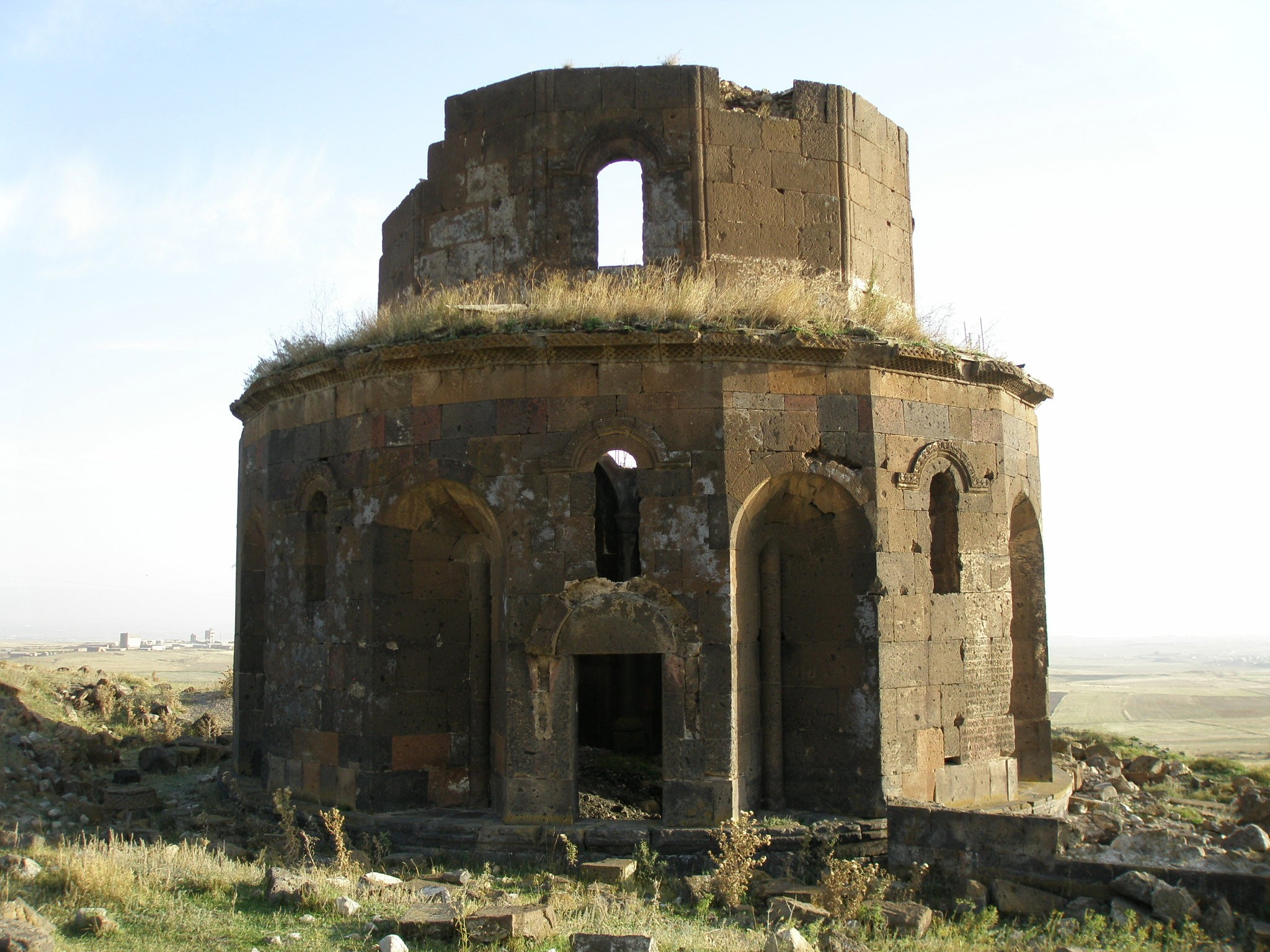
Gharghavank Church, Zoravan, 7th century

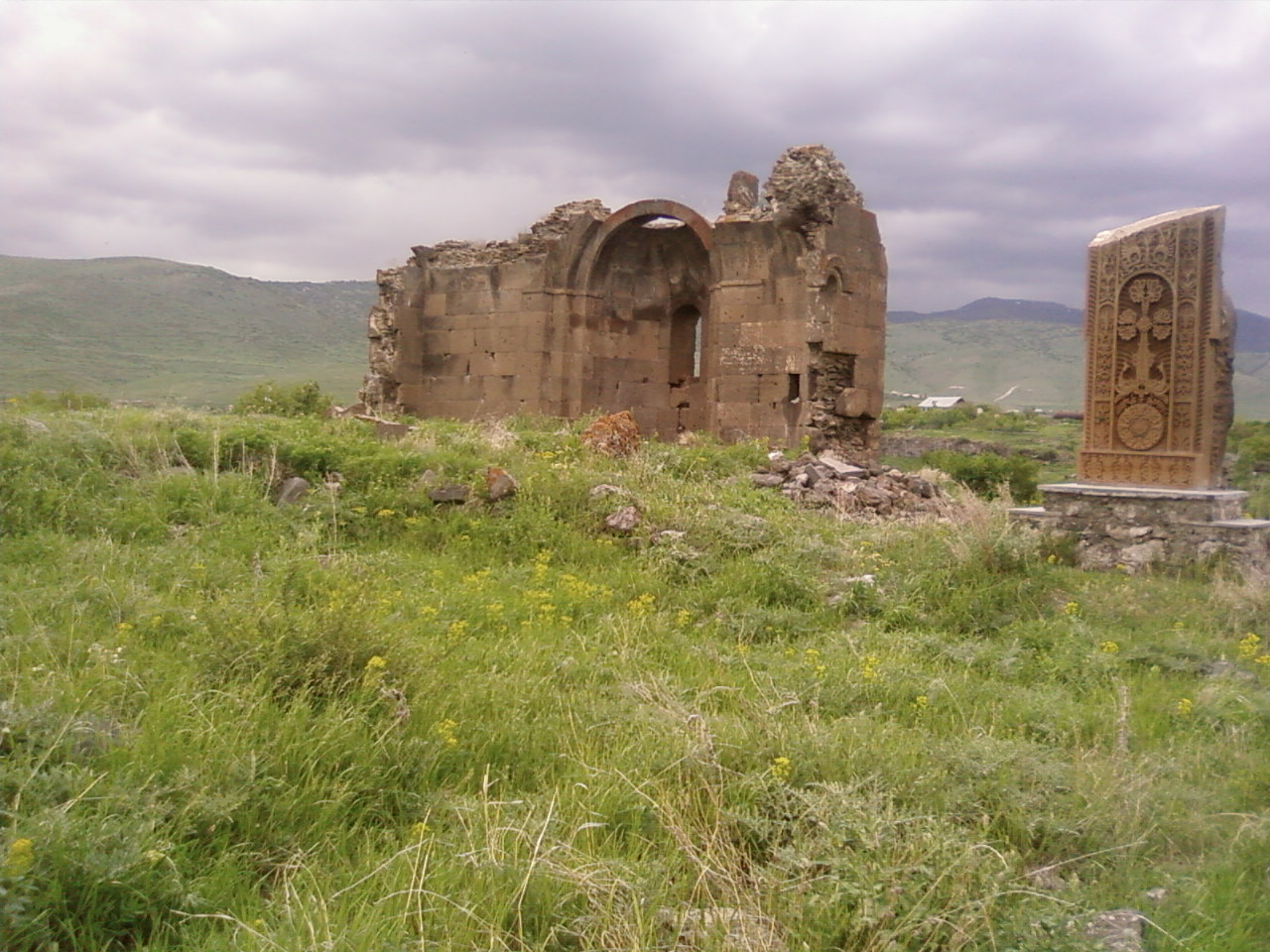
Saint George's Monastery near Argel, 7th century

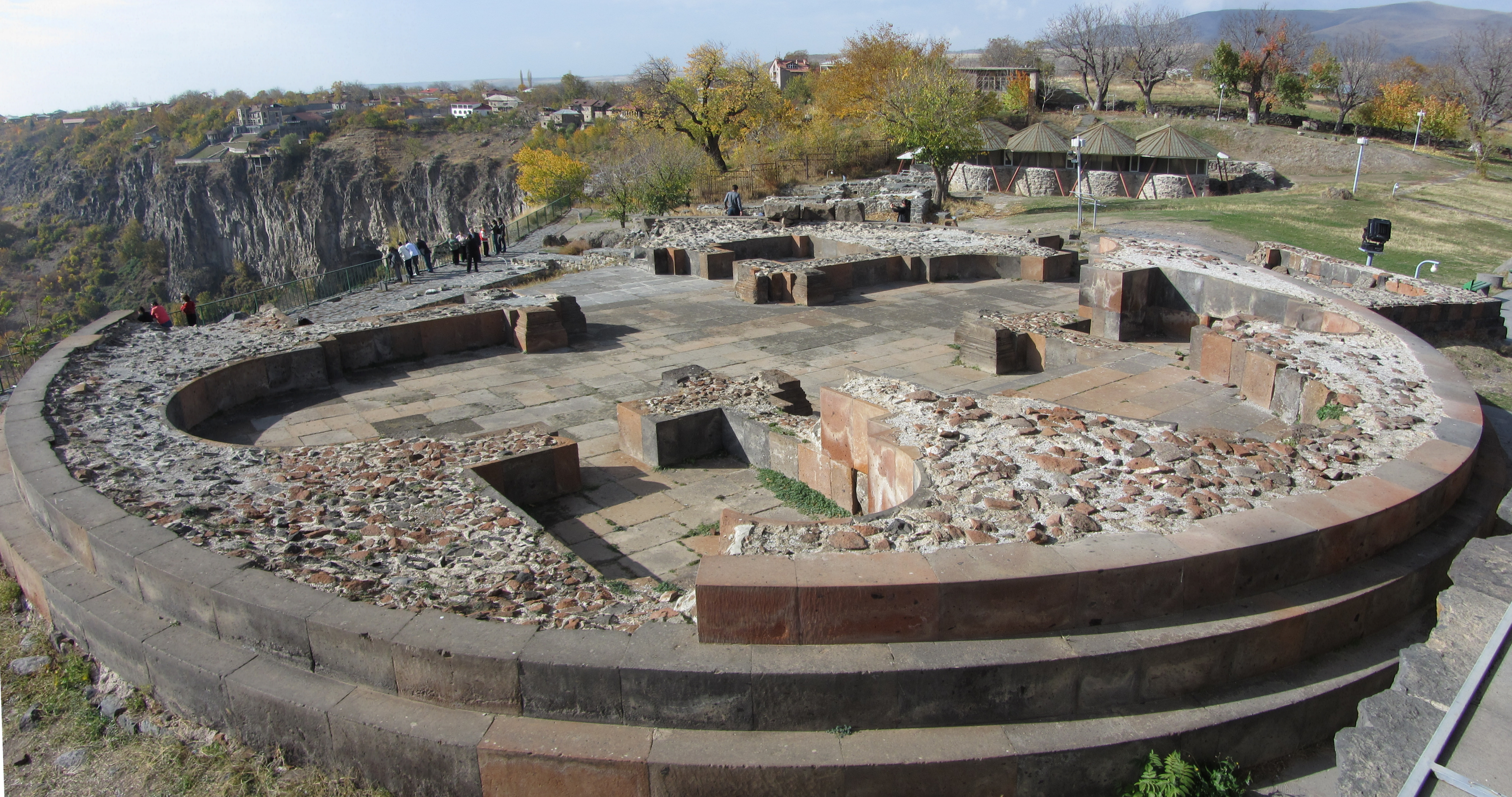
Holy Zion Church, Garni, 7th century

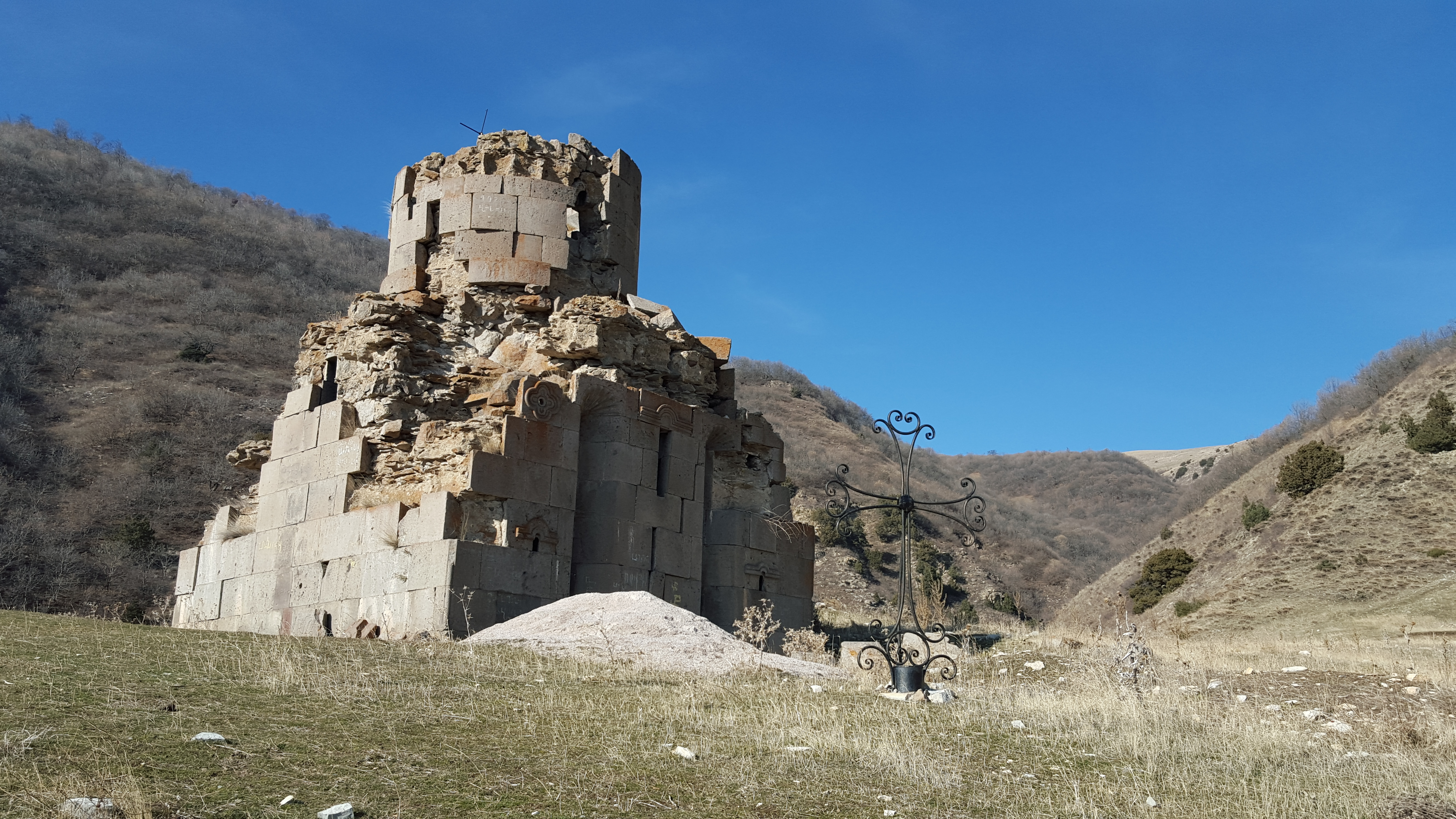
Mayravank Monastery, Solak, 7-11th century

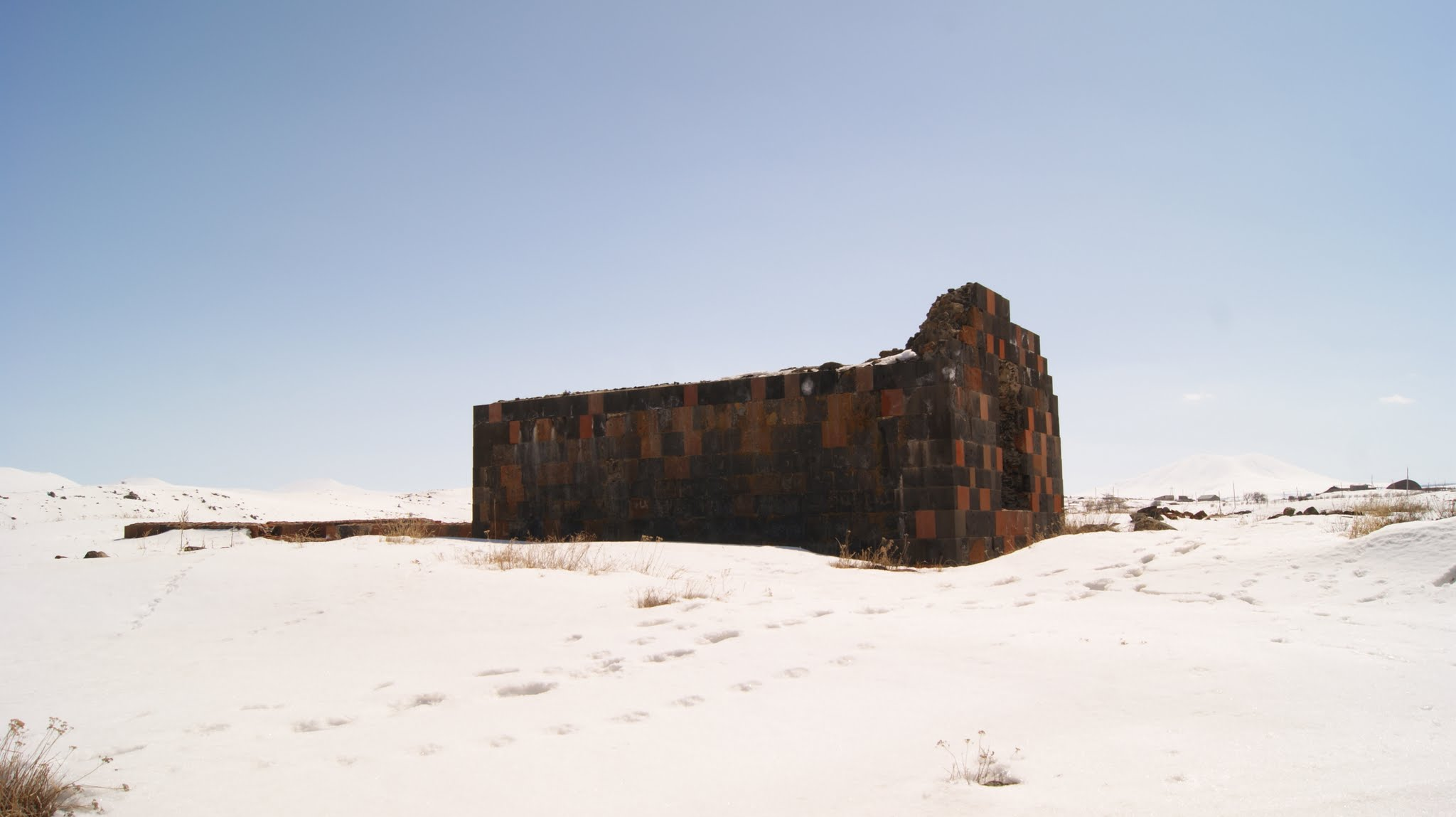
Holy Cross Church, Bjni, 9th century

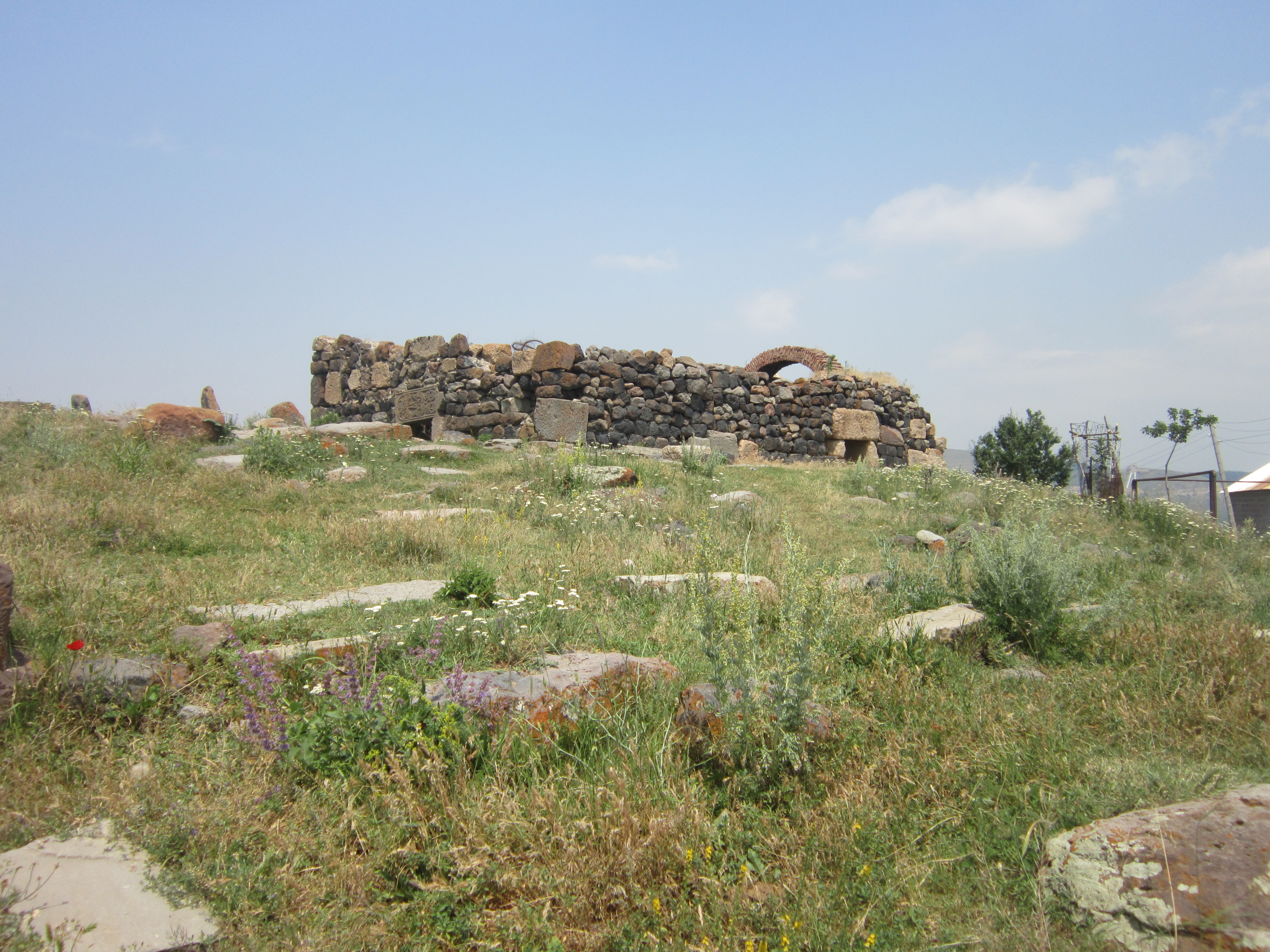
Surp Stepanos Church of Aghbyurak, Hrazdan, 10-12th centuries

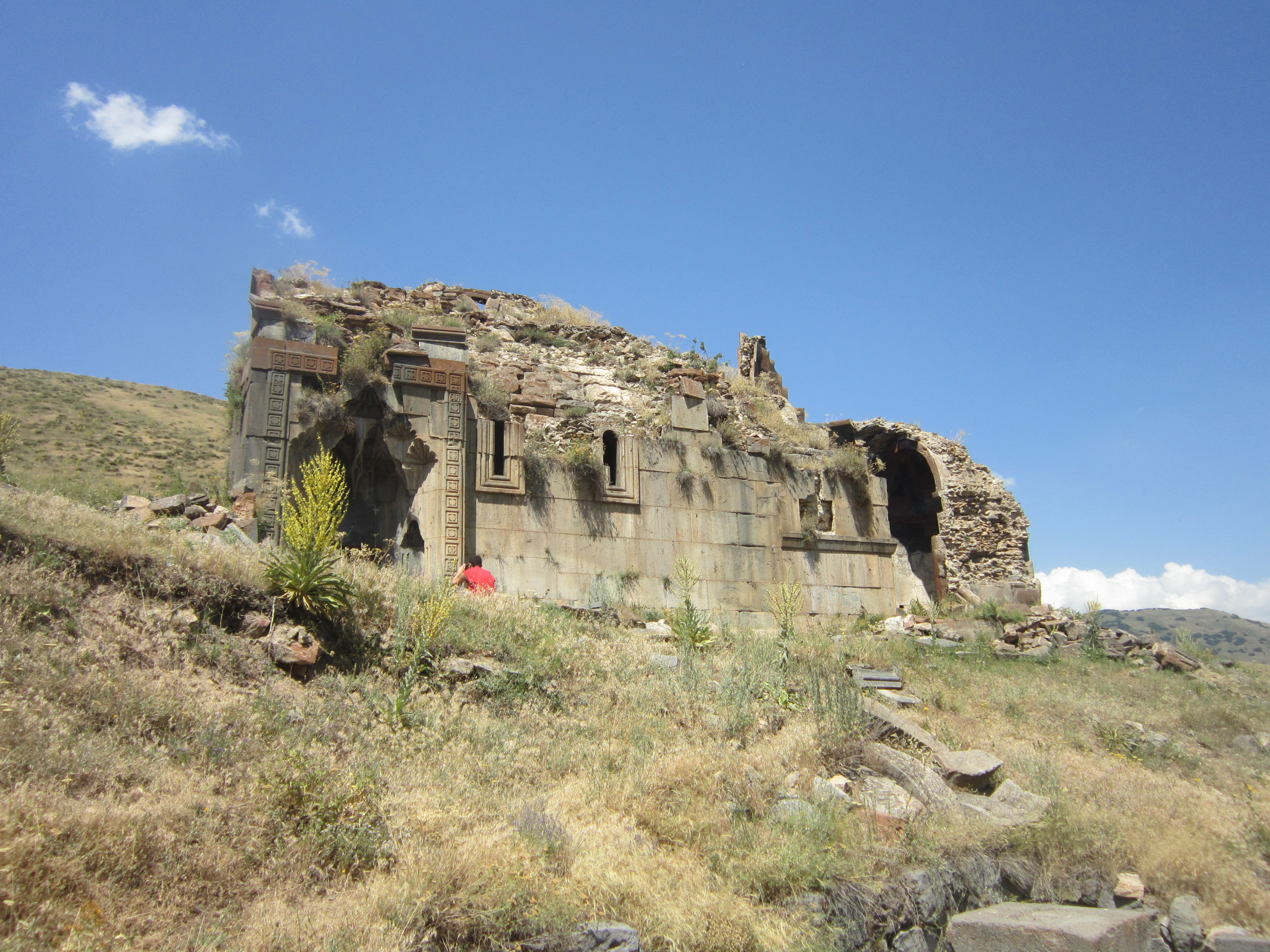
Neghuts Monastery, Arzakan, 10-13th centuries

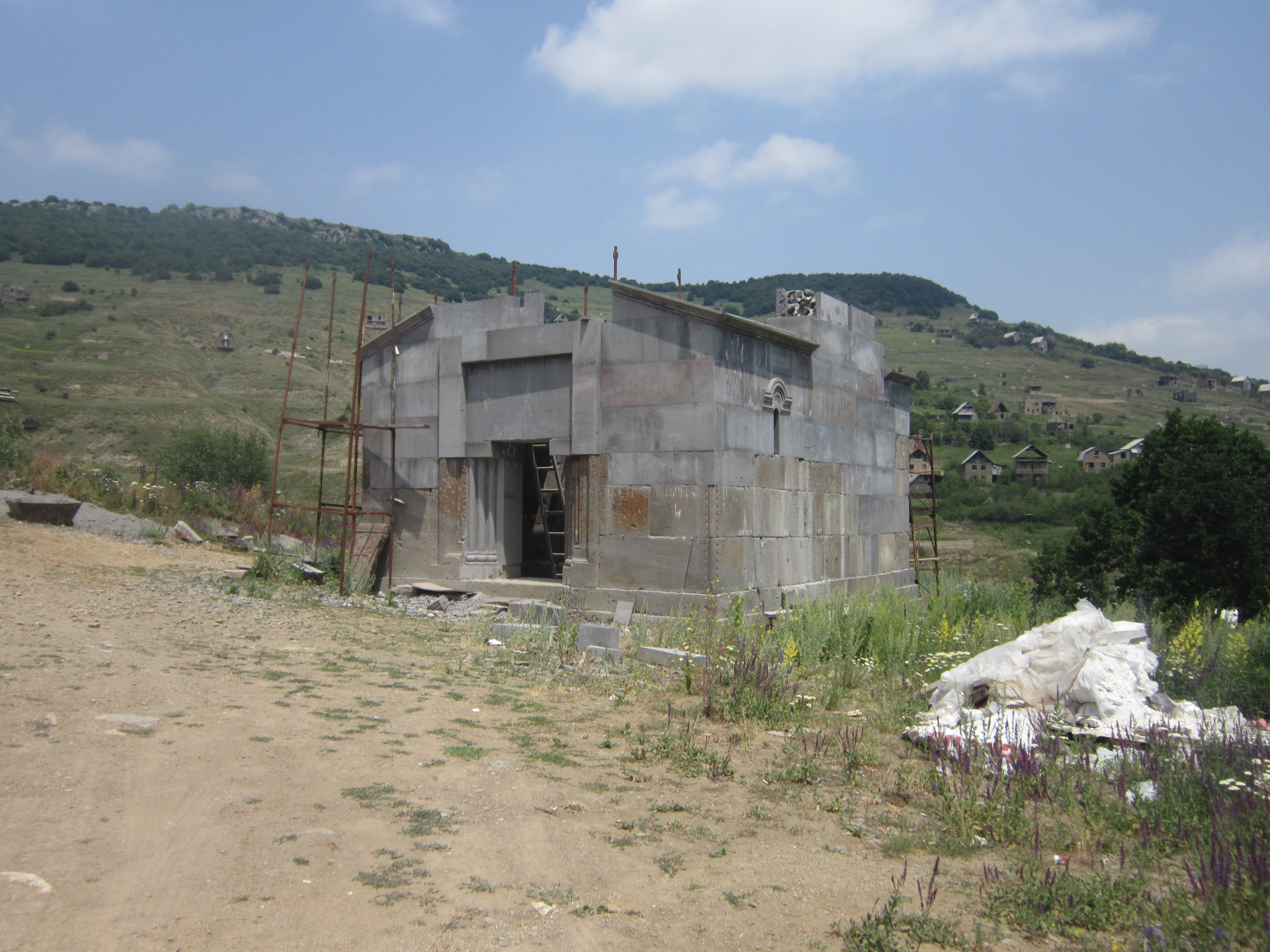
Holy Right Monastery, Hrazdan, 10-14th centuries

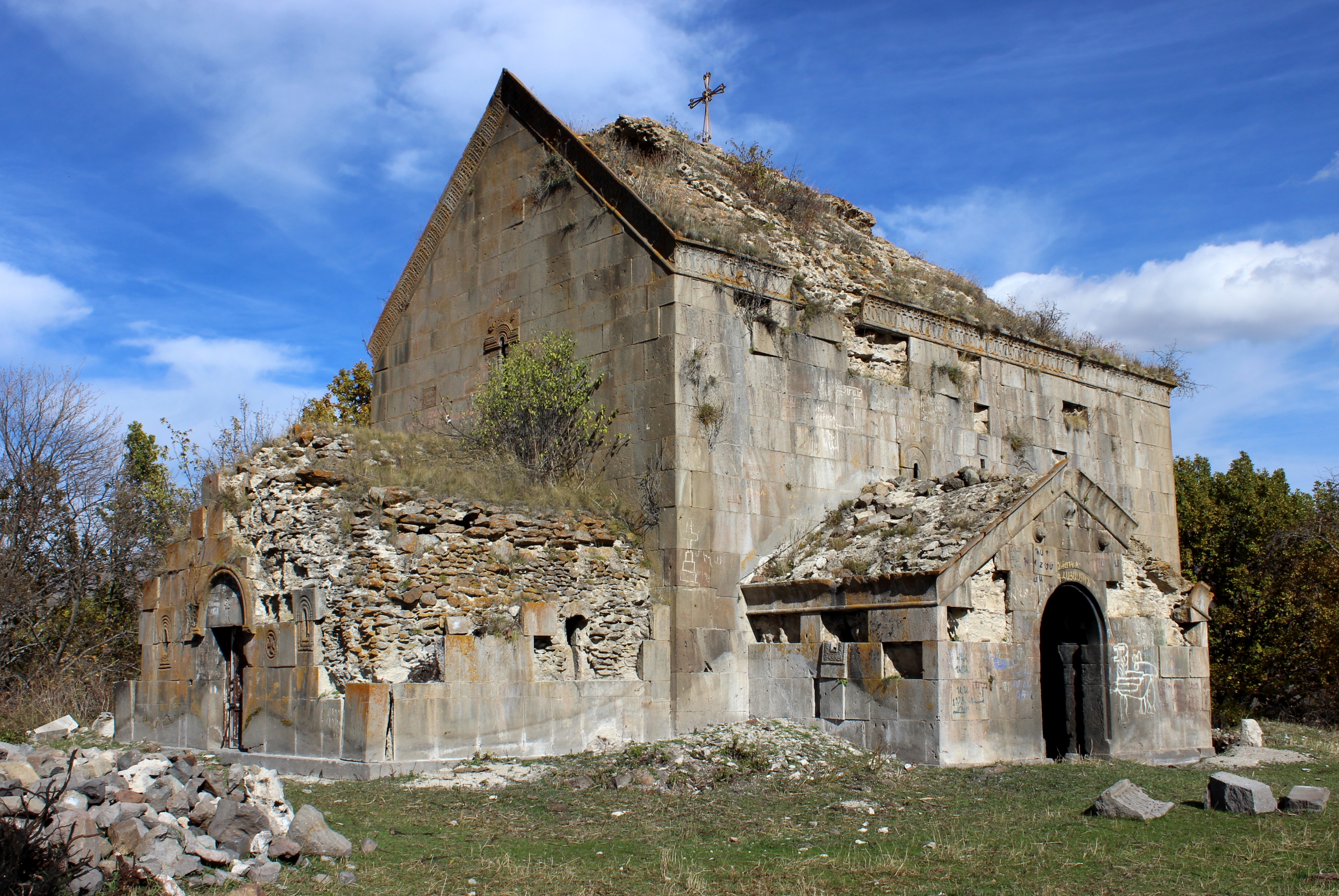
Tejharuyk Monastery, Meghradzor, 1199

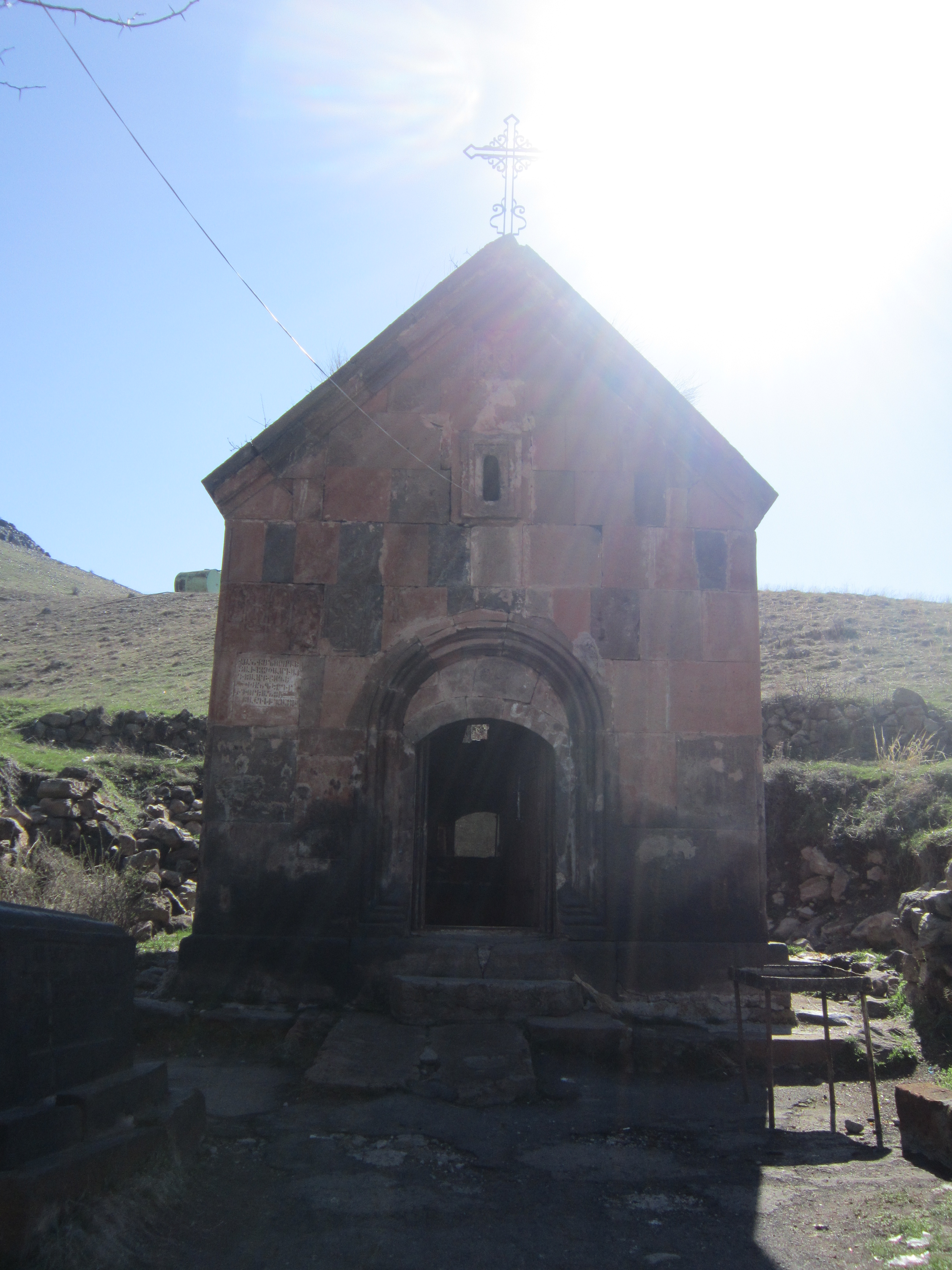
Monastery of Saints Paul and Peter, 12-13th centuries

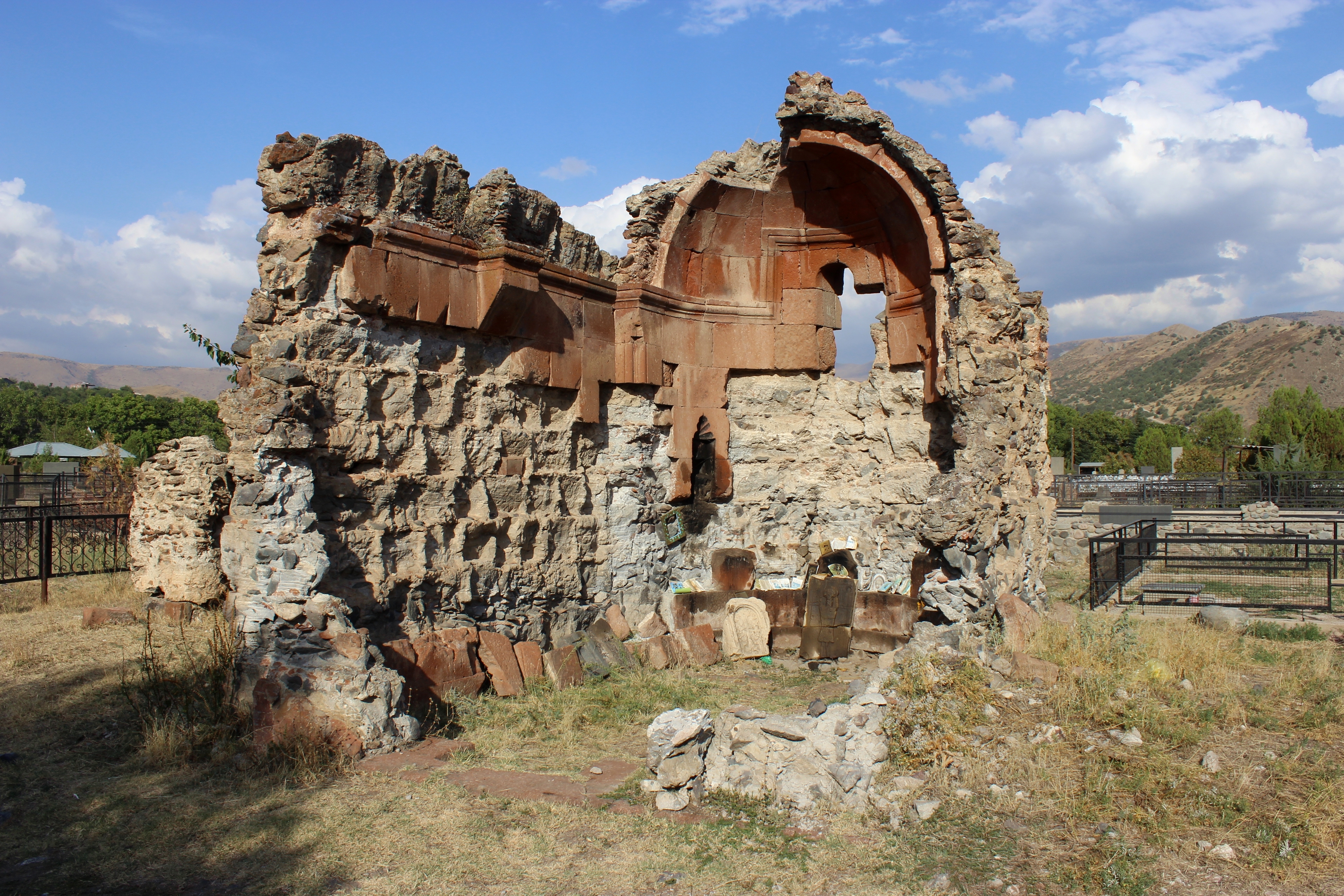
Holy Mother of God Church, Garni, 12-13th centuries

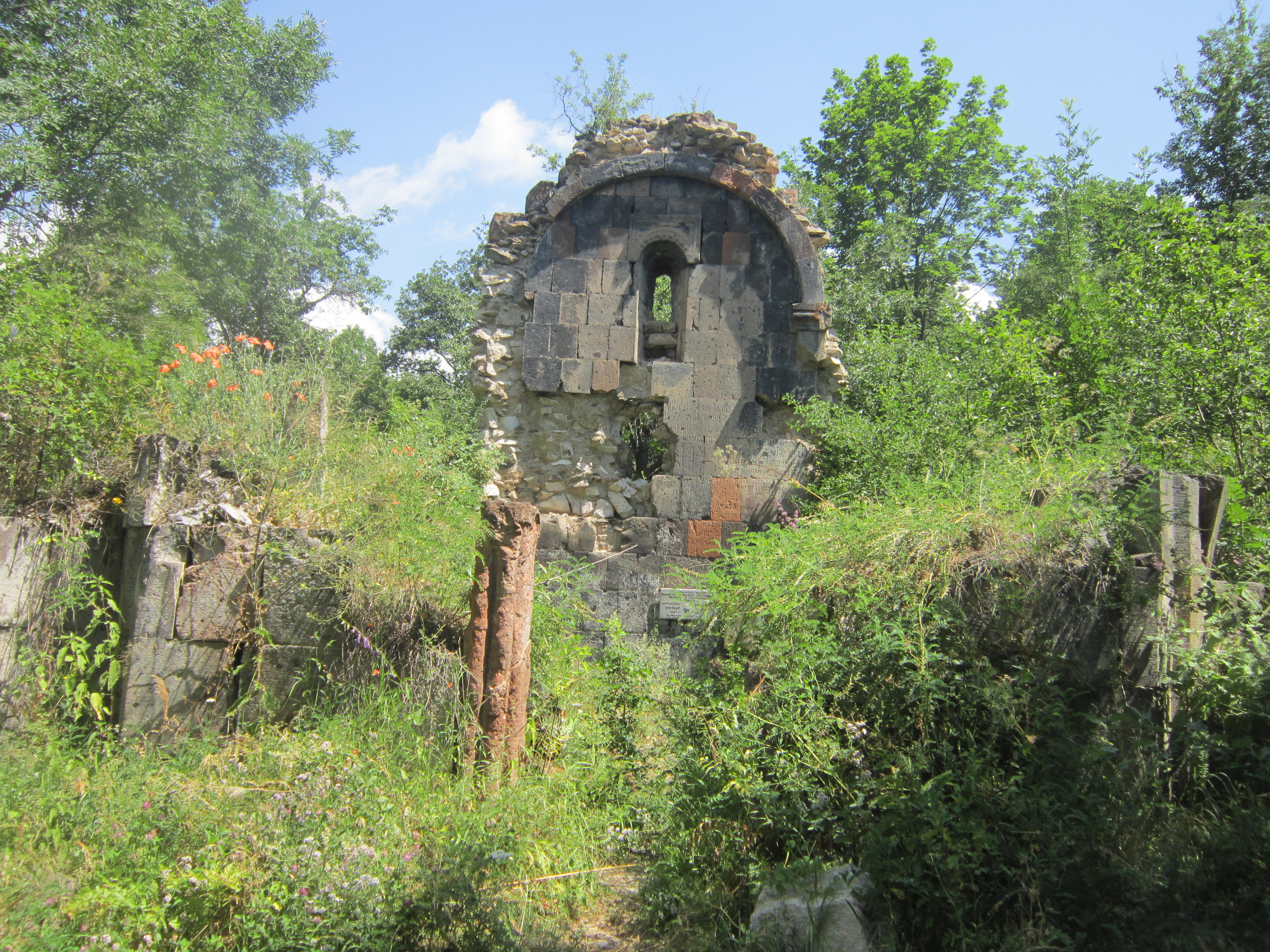
Chorut Monastery, Arzakan, 1207

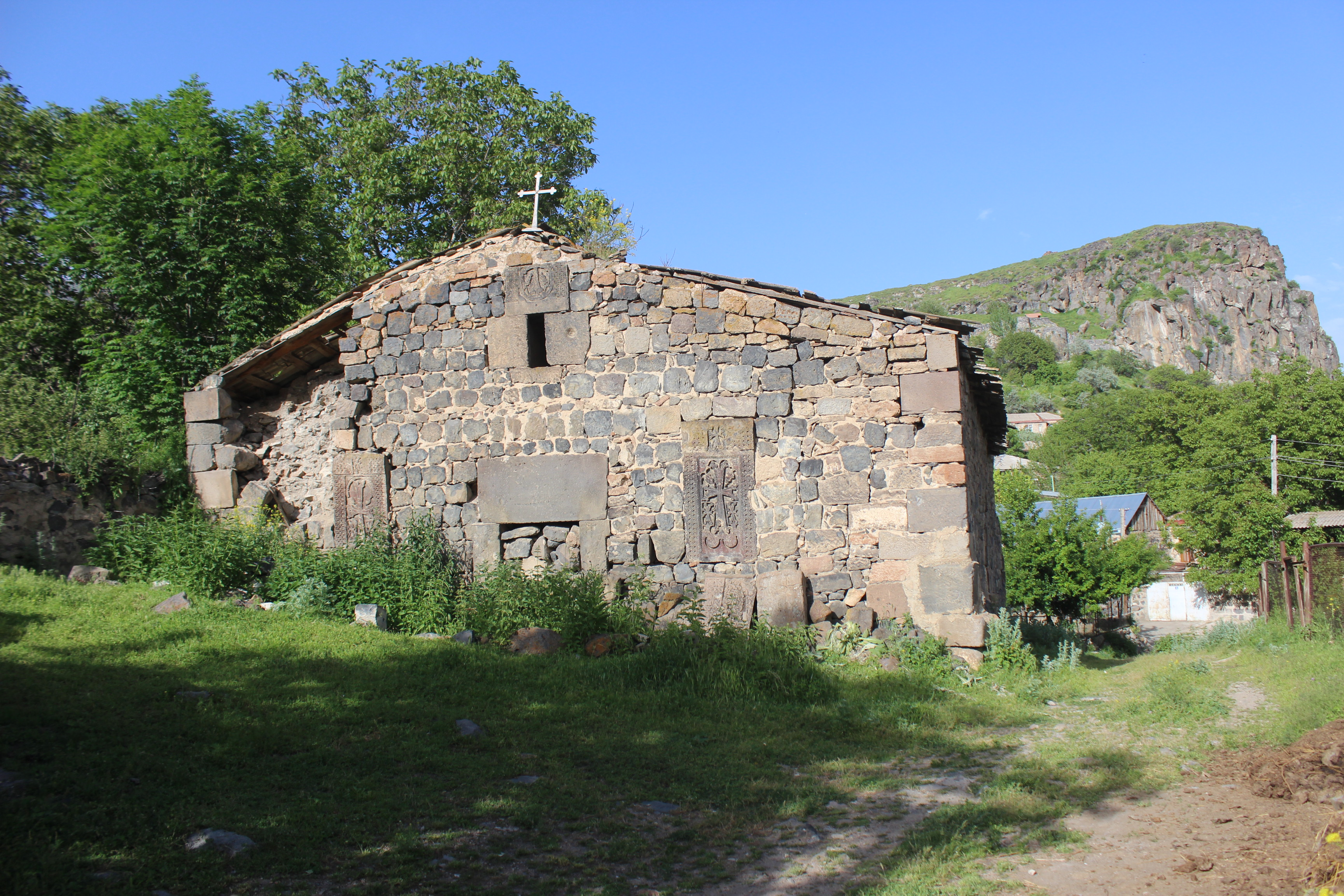
Saint George's Church, Bjni, 13th century

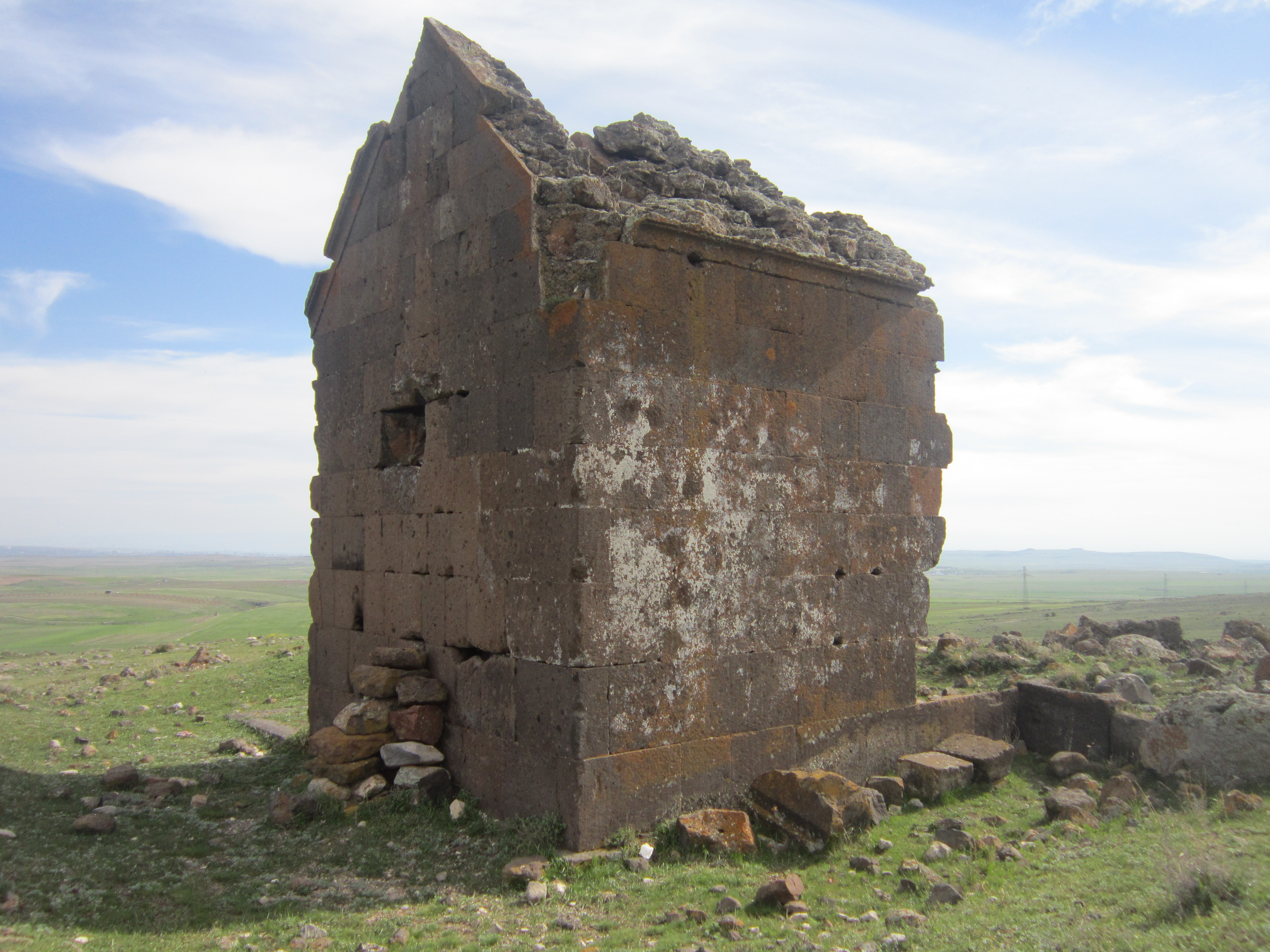
Zoravan Church, Zoravan, 13th century

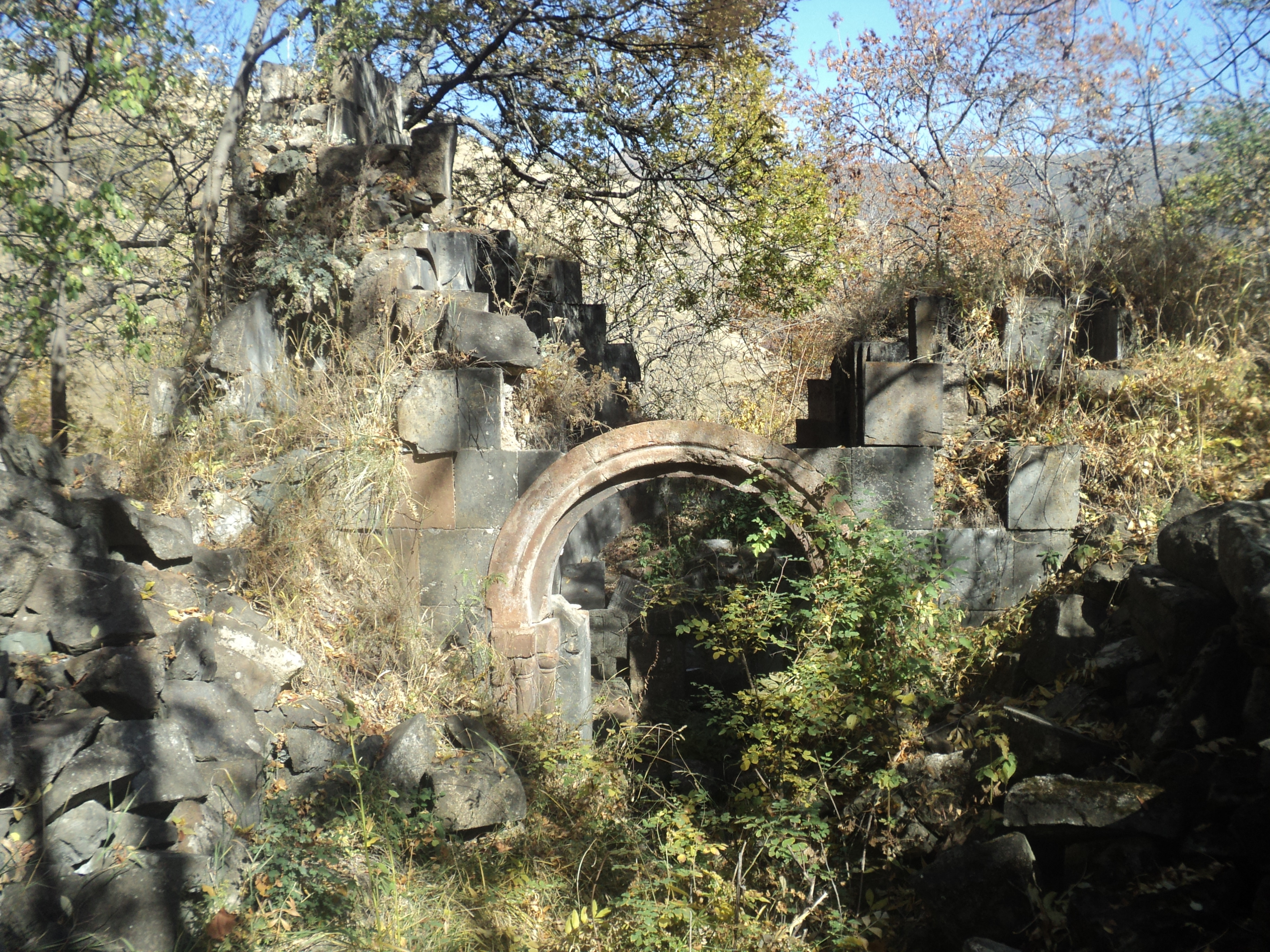
Saint George's Church, Arzakan, 13-14th century

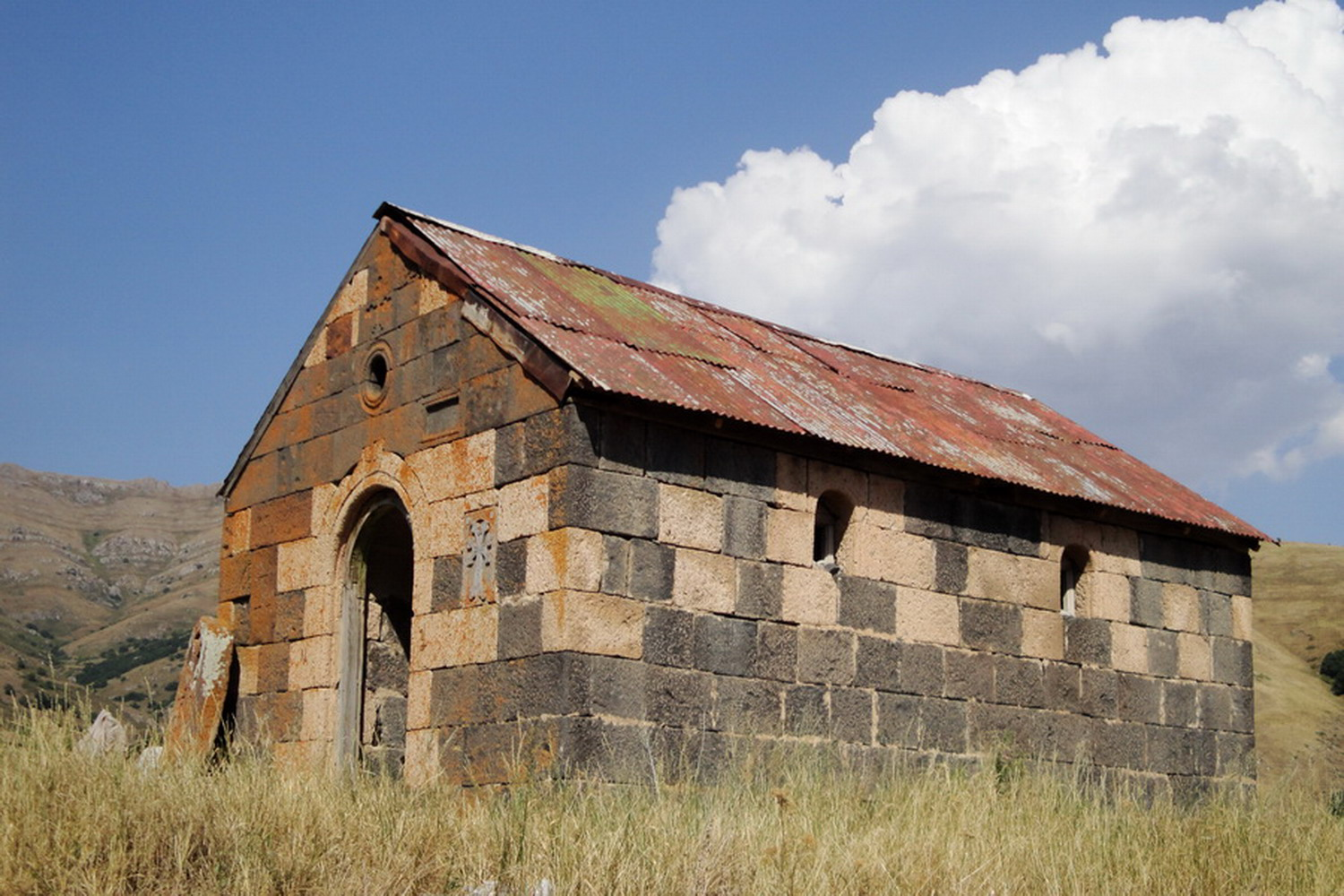
Kakavadzor Chapel, Hrazdan, 18-19th centuries

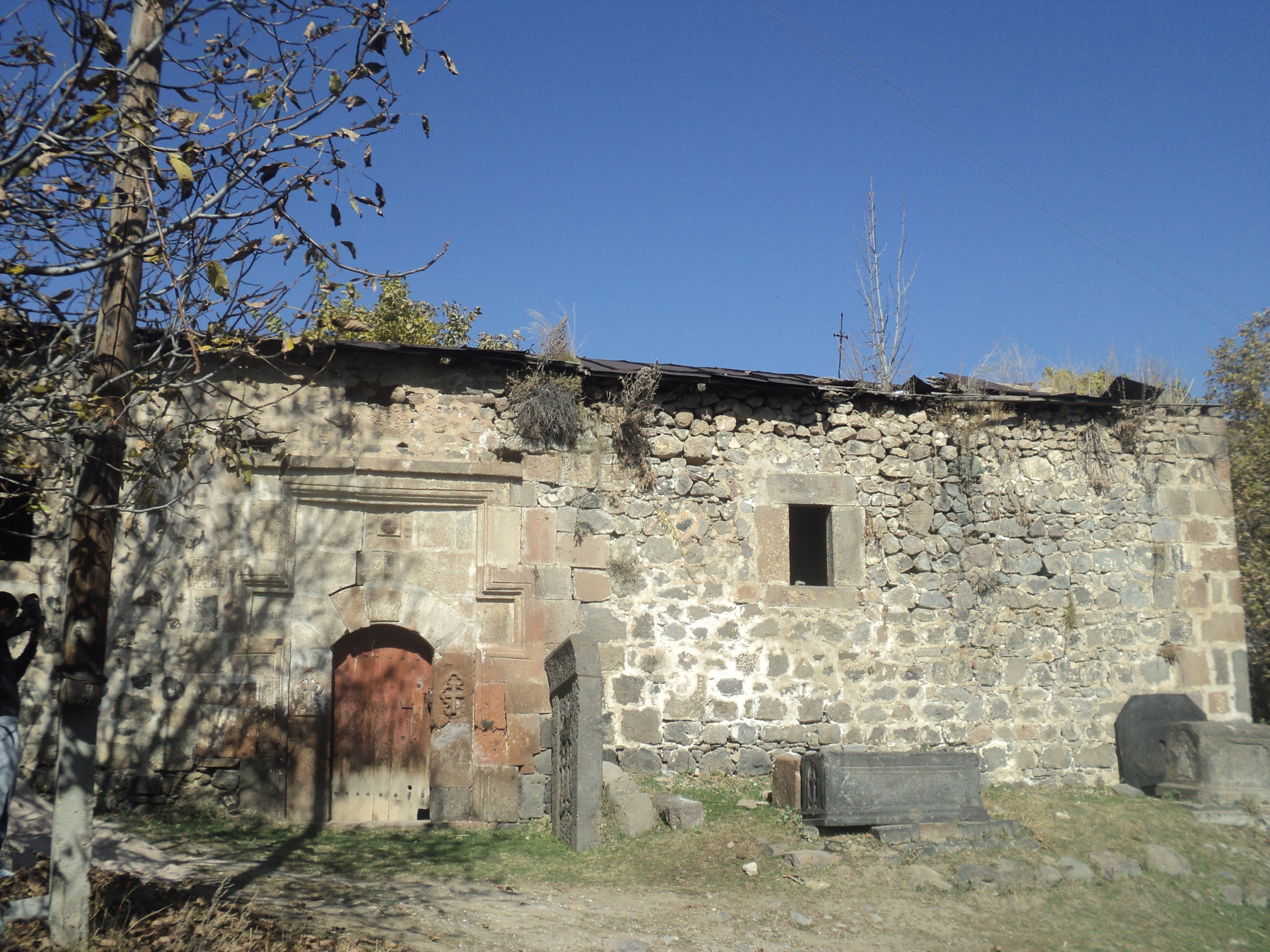
Surp Stepanos Church, Arzakan, 1867

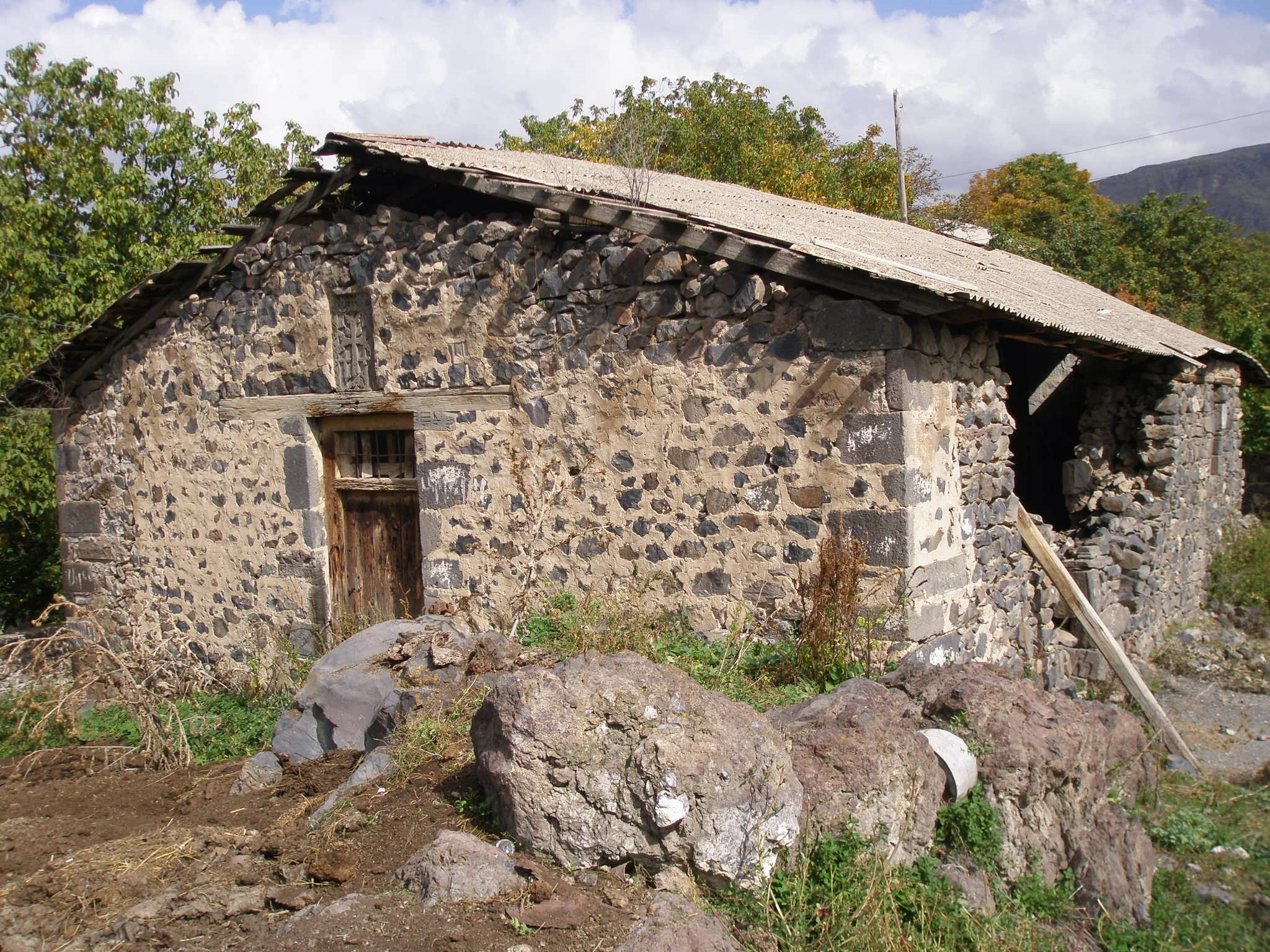
Holy Mother of God Church, Goght, 19th century
