= Saralanj =

Saralanj or Saralandzh or Saralandj may refer to:

- Saralanj, Aragatsotn, Armenia
- Saralanj, Kotayk, Armenia
- Saralanj, Lori, Armenia
- Saralanj, Shirak, Armenia
- Cilən, Azerbaijan
