= Akhbrak =

- Location within Armenia
- Coordinates: 40°30′34″N 44°44′02″E
- Country: Armenia
- Marz (Province): Kotayk
- Time zone: UTC+4 ( )
  - Summer (DST): UTC+5 ( )

Akhbrak (also, Akhpyurak and Agpara) is a town in the Kotayk Province of Armenia.

== See also ==
- Kotayk Province
