= Katnaghbyur =

Katnaghbyur or Katnaghbur may refer to:

- Katnaghbyur, Aragatsotn, Armenia
- Katnaghbyur, Kotayk, Armenia
- Katnaghbyur, Lori, Armenia
