= Avazak =

Avazan
- Location within Armenia
- Coordinates: 40°24′21″N 44°35′32″E
- Country: Armenia
- Marz (Province): Kotayk
- Time zone: UTC+4 ( )
  - Summer (DST): UTC+5 ( )

Avazan is a town in the Kotayk Province of Armenia.

== See also ==
- Kotayk Province
