= Nor Gyugh =

Nor Gyugh Նոր Գյուղ
- Location within Armenia
- Coordinates: 40°16′00″N 44°39′23″E
- Country: Armenia
- Marz (Province): Kotayk
- Elevation: 1,435 m (4,708 ft)

Population (2011)
  - Total: 1,423
- Time zone: UTC+4 ( )
  - Summer (DST): UTC+5 ( )

Nor Gyugh (Armenian: Նոր Գյուղ, also Romanized as Nor Gyukh; formerly, Tazagyukh) is a town in the Kotayk Province of Armenia. 'Nor Gyugh' translates as 'New Village' in English. The village is mainly populated by Armenians but has a Kurdish minority (including Yazidis).

== See also ==
- Kotayk Province
