= Nor Artamet =

Nor Artamet Նոր Արտամետ
- Location within Armenia
- Coordinates: 40°17′56″N 44°33′15″E
- Country: Armenia
- Marz (Province): Kotayk
- Elevation: 1,300 m (4,300 ft)

Population (2011)
  - Total: 844
- Time zone: UTC+4 ( )
  - Summer (DST)

Nor Artamet (Armenian: Նոր Արտամետ) is a village in the Kotayk Province of Armenia.

== See also ==
- Kotayk Province
