= Saranist =

- Location within Armenia
- Coordinates: 40°12′46″N 44°47′06″E
- Country: Armenia
- Marz (Province): Kotayk
- Time zone: UTC+4 ( )

Saranist (also, Saramist and Tutiya) is a former village in the Kotayk Province of Armenia.

== See also ==
- Kotayk Province
