= Marmarik =

Marmarik Մարմարիկ
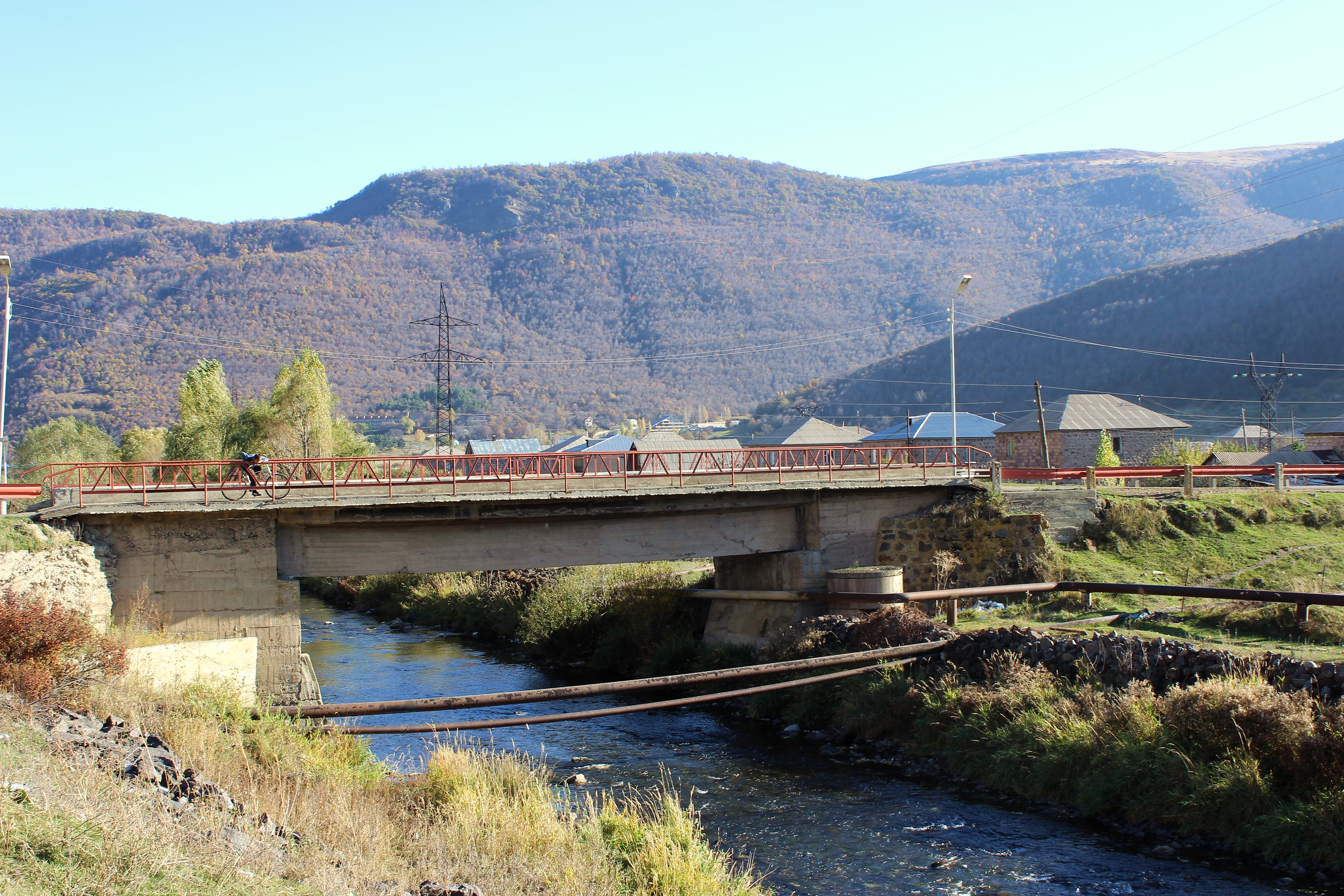
- Bridge crossing into the village of Marmarik.

- Location within Armenia
- Coordinates: 40°34′58″N 44°40′06″E
- Country: Armenia
- Marz (Province): Kotayk
- Elevation: 1,750 m (5,740 ft)

Population (2011)
  - Total: 720
- Time zone: UTC+4 ( )

Marmarik (Armenian: Մարմարիկ), is a village in the Kotayk Province of Armenia.

== See also ==
- Kotayk Province
