= Verin Ptghni =

Verin Ptghni Վերին Պտղնի
- Location within Armenia
- Coordinates: 40°16′13″N 44°36′04″E
- Country: Armenia
- Marz (Province): Kotayk
- Elevation: 1,350 m (4,430 ft)

Population (2011)
  - Total: 893
- Time zone: UTC+4 ( )

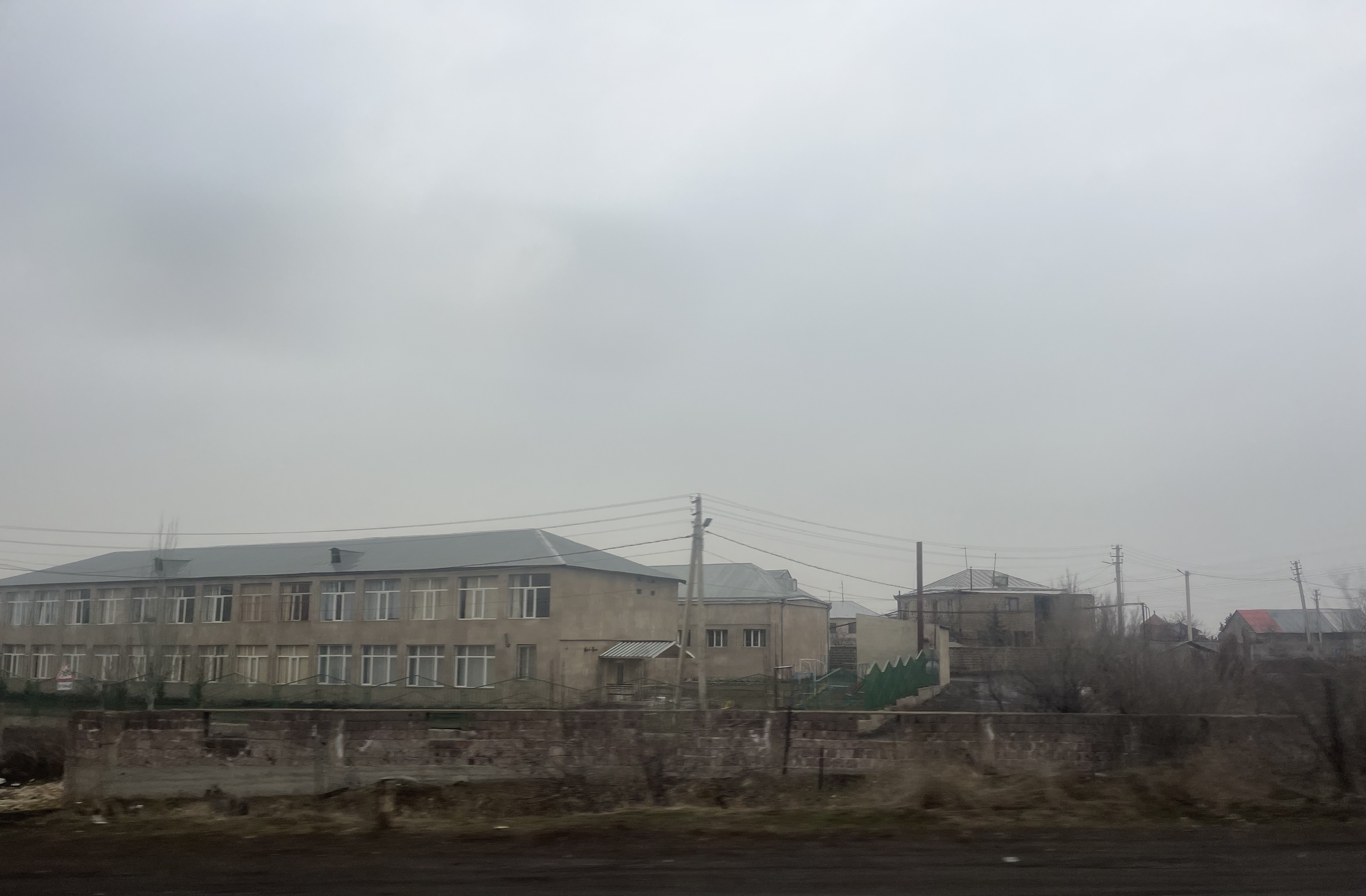
Verin Ptghni

Verin Ptghni (Armenian: Վերին Պտղնի), is a village in the Kotayk Province of Armenia.

== See also ==
- Kotayk Province
