= Aragyugh =

Aragyugh Արագյուղ
- Village
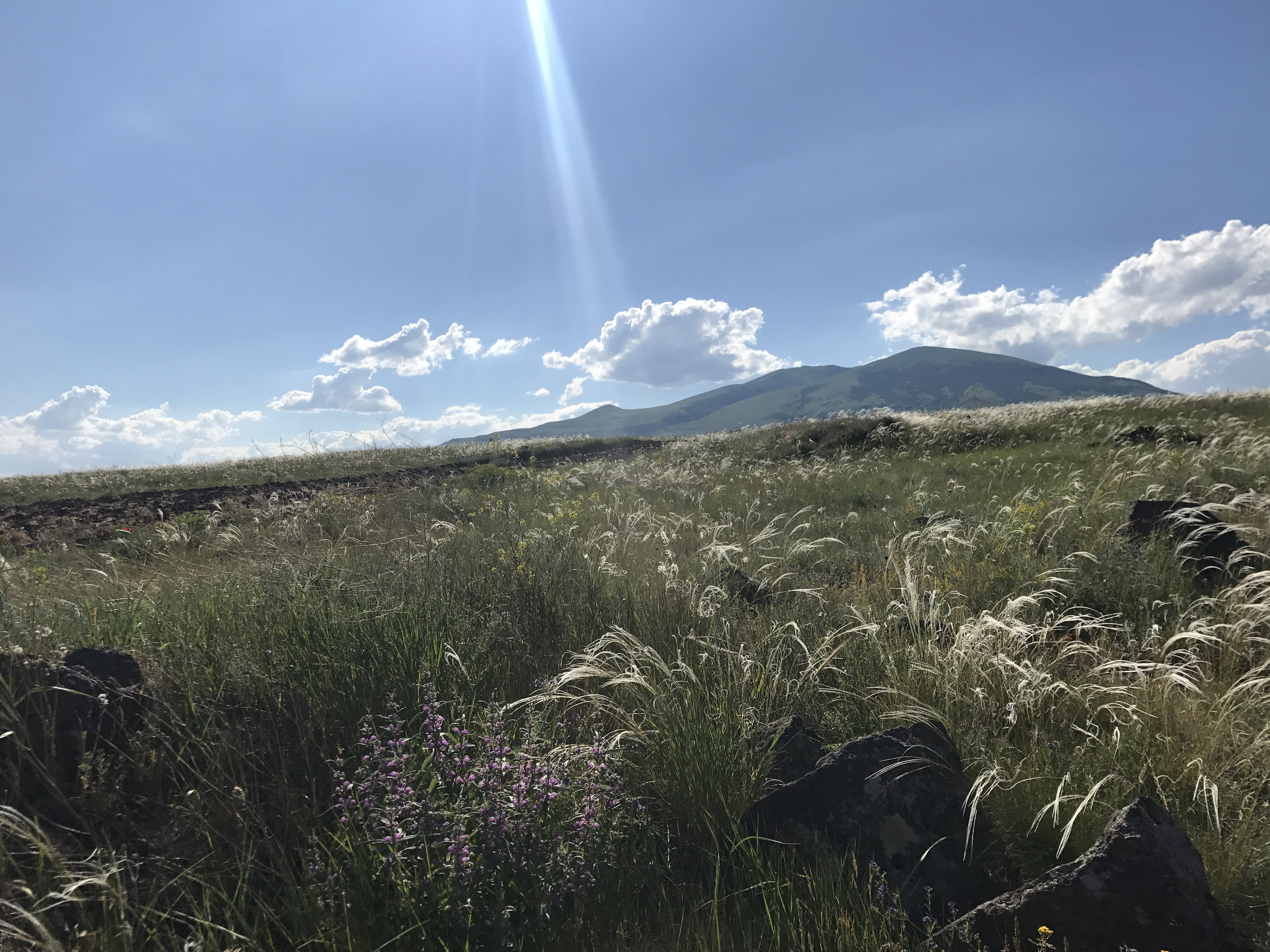
- Aragyugh highlands

- Location within Armenia
- Coordinates: 40°24′09″N 44°32′37″E
- Country: Armenia
- Province: Kotayk

Population (2011)
  - Total: 994
- Time zone: UTC+4 (AMT)

Aragyugh (Armenian: Արագյուղ) is a village in the Kotayk Province of Armenia. The highlands in this area are believed to be some of the cleanest and most bountiful in the country, with the altitude of 1,600 meters above sea level.

== Toponymy ==
The village was previously known as Karadzhoran.

== Economy ==
Aragyugh is home to the eco-farm and laboratory facilities of Armenia's first all-natural cosmetics company, Nairian Cosmetics. Nairian products include essential oils that are harvested and distilled in Aragyugh.
