= Getargel =

Getragel Գետարգել
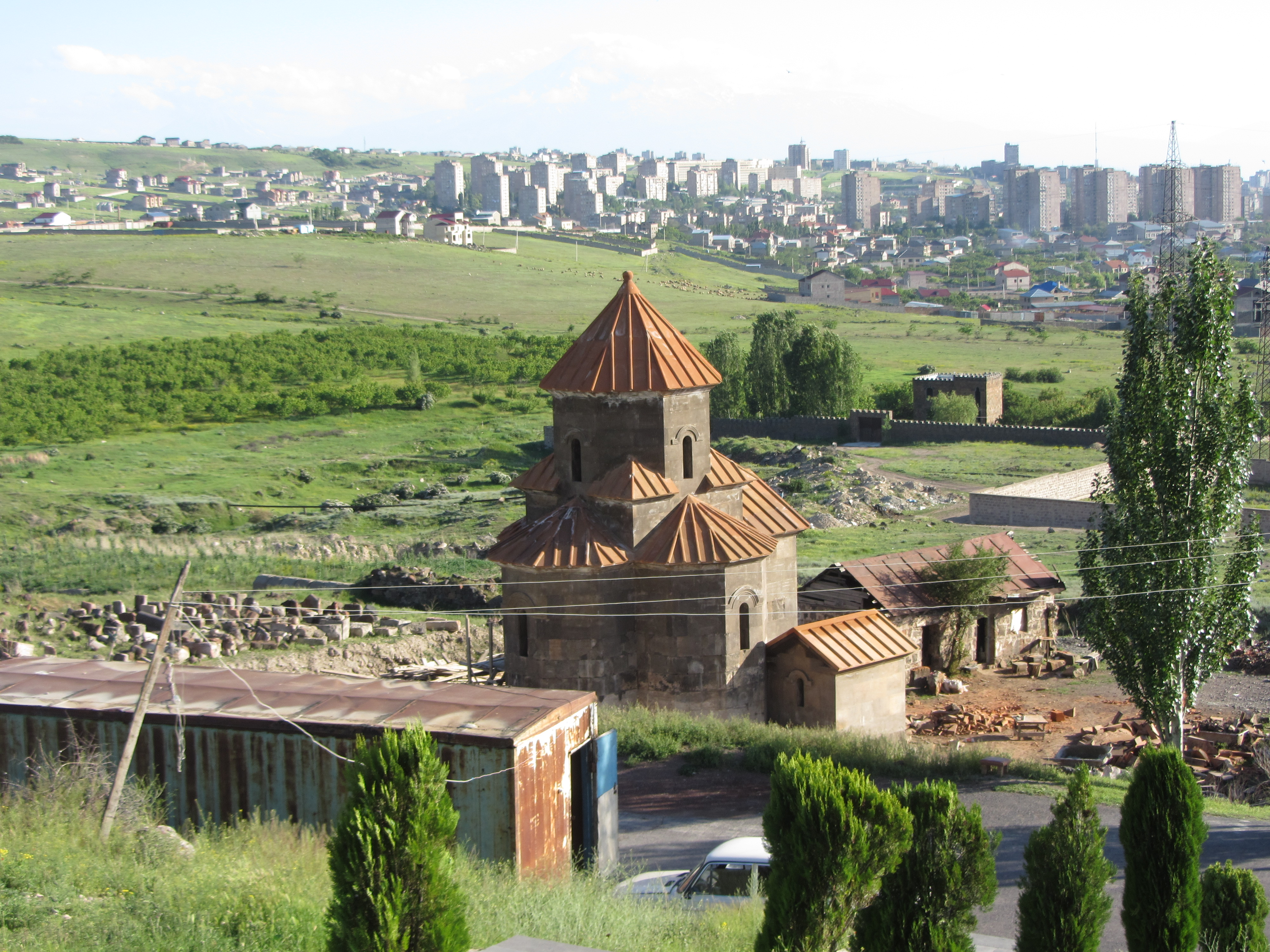
- Dzagavank Monastery in Getargel

- Location within Armenia
- Coordinates: 40°14′33″N 44°35′46″E
- Country: Armenia
- Marz (Province): Kotayk

Population (2011 census)
  - Total: 795
- Time zone: UTC+4 ( )

Getargel (Armenian: Գետարգել), formerly known as Radiokayanin kits (ռադիոկայանին կից), or SMO, is a village in the Kotayk Province of Armenia.

The Dzagavank Monastery, also known as the Surp Nshan Monastery of Getargel, is located on the village's southern outskirts. The monastery consists of two churches: the main church of Surp Nshan dating back to the 7th century, and the 13th-century two-story chapel. The monastic complex was entirely renovated between 2001 and 2004.

As of the 2011 census, the population of the village is 795. In addition to Armenians, the village has a Kurdish population.

== Gallery ==
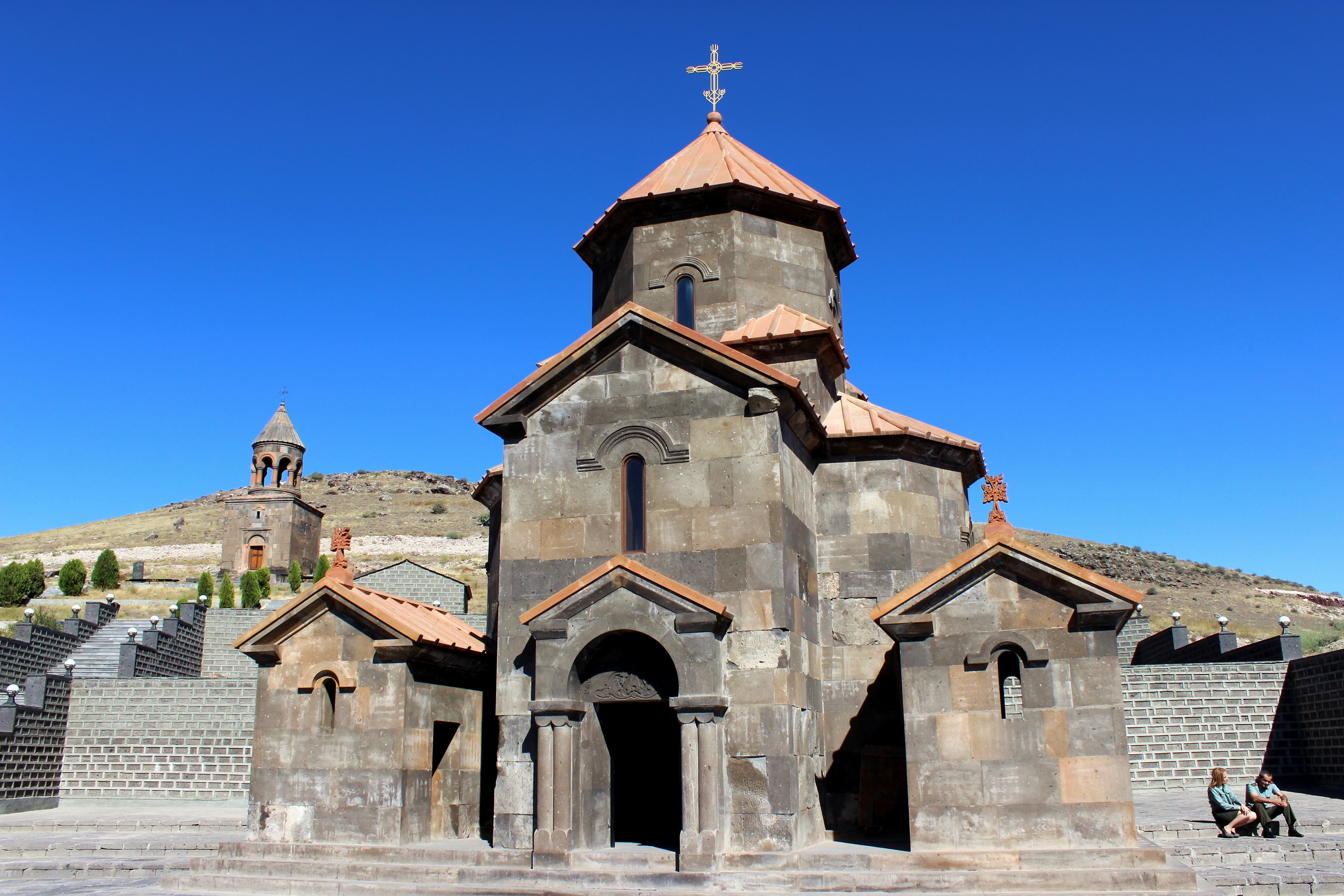
Church of Surp Nshan of Dzagavank Monastery of the 7th century

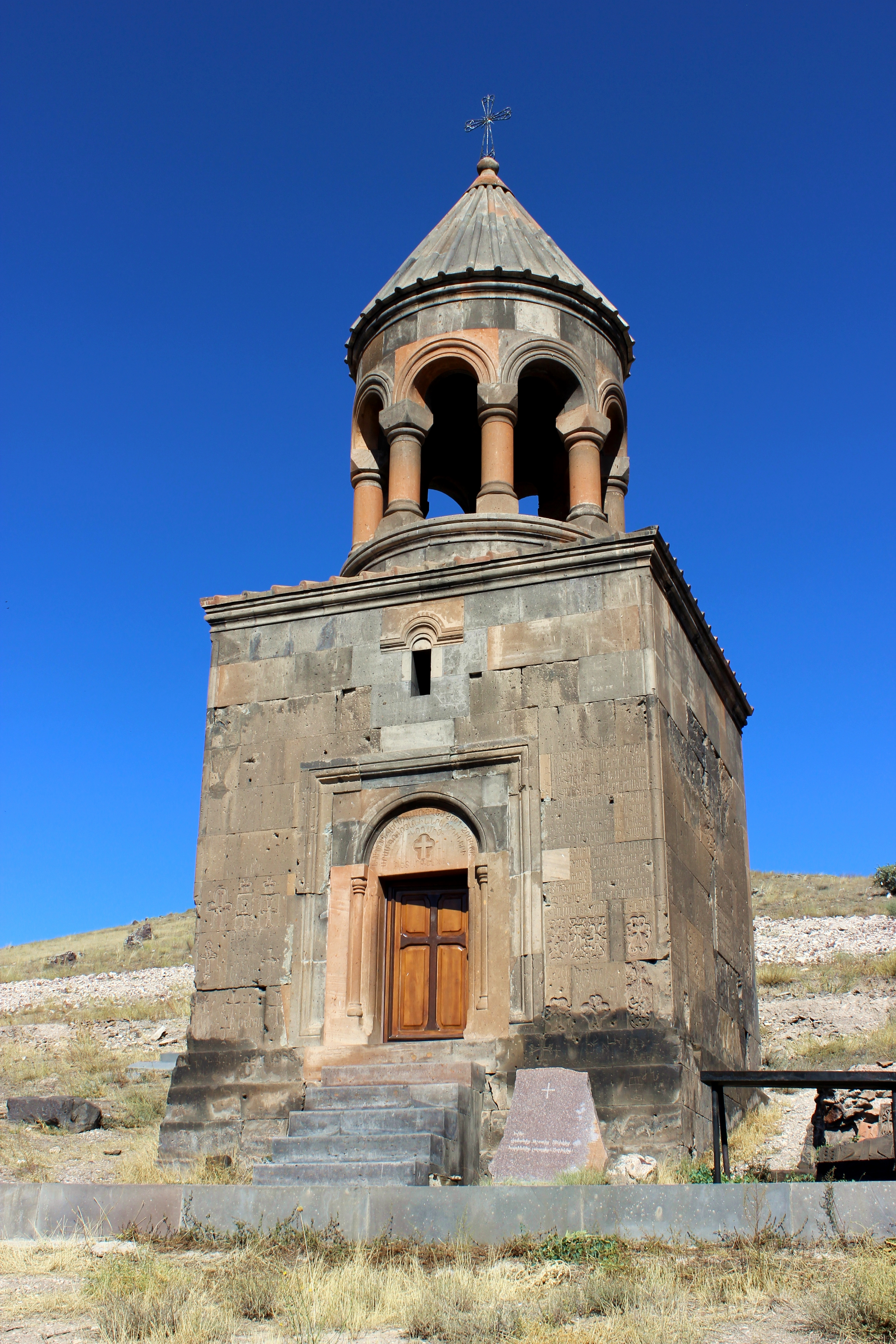
The 13th-century chapel at Dzagavank Monastery

== See also ==
- Kotayk Province
