= Getamej =

Getamej Գետամեջ
- Location within Armenia
- Coordinates: 40°16′30″N 44°35′06″E
- Country: Armenia
- Marz (Province): Kotayk

Population (2011)
  - Total: 698
- Time zone: UTC+4 ( )
  - Summer (DST): UTC+5 ( )

Getamej (Armenian: Գետամեջ, also Romanized as Getamech; until 1948, Ketran) is a town in the Kotayk Province of Armenia. 'Getamej' translates roughly to English as 'Mid-River'.

== See also ==
- Kotayk Province
