= Zovashen, Kotayk =

Zovashen Զովաշեն
- Location within Armenia
- Coordinates: 40°18′42″N 44°44′56″E
- Country: Armenia
- Marz (Province): Kotayk
- Elevation: 2,040 m (6,690 ft)

Population (2011)
  - Total: 147
- Time zone: UTC+4 ( )

Zovashen (Armenian: Զովաշեն, formerly, Dallaklu) is a village in the Kotayk Province of Armenia. The village is overwhelmingly ethnic Armenian (86%) while the remaining population is Kurdish (14%) and the locals are mainly engaged in agriculture.

== See also ==
- Kotayk Province
