= Arzakan-Meghradzor Sanctuary =

Coordinates: 40.527794°N 44.609417°E

- IUCN category IV (habitat/species management area)
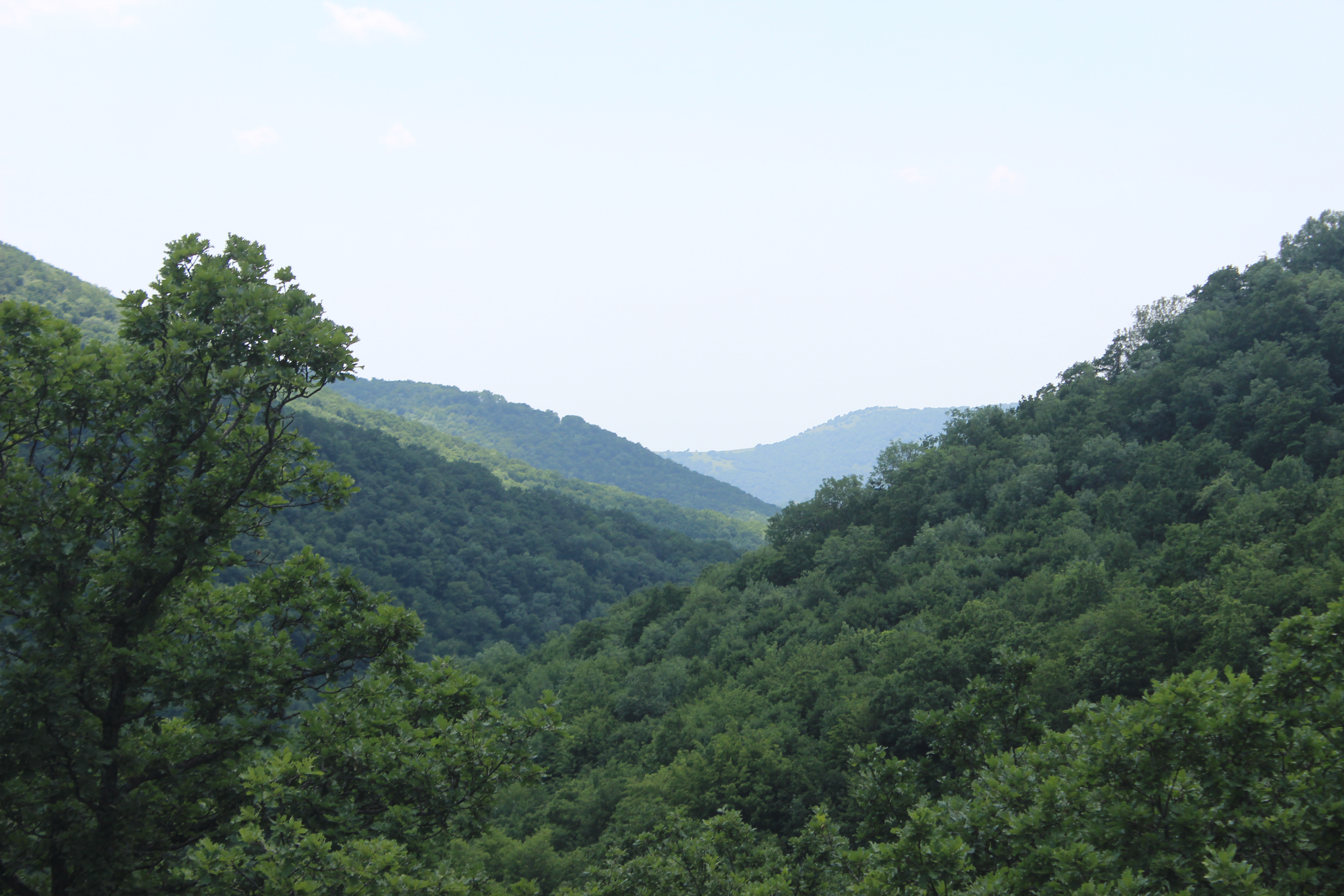
- Arzakan-Meghradzor Sanctuary
- Interactive map of Arzakan-Meghradzor Sanctuary
- Area: 135.32 km²
- Established: 1971

The Arzakan-Meghradzor Sanctuary (Armenian: Արզական-Մեղրաձորի արգելավայր, romanized: Arzakan-Meghradzori argelavayr is a protected area in the Armenian Kotayk Province. The sanctuary covers an area of 135.32 km² in the Hrazdan forest. It has a protection level of 4 according to the IUCN protection system.

The sanctuary protects mountain forests consisting mainly of oak trees. This environment forms a valuable habitat for animals like the brown bear, roe deer and the caucasian black grouse.
