= Nor Yerznka =

Village in Aragatsotn, Armenia

Nor Yerznka Նոր Երզնկա
- Location within Armenia Location within Aragatsotn
- Coordinates: 40°18′48″N 44°24′17″E
- Country: Armenia
- Province: Aragatsotn
- Municipality: Ashtarak
- Elevation: 1,318 m (4,324 ft)

Population (2011)
  - Total: 1,628
- Time zone: UTC+4
  - Summer (DST): UTC+5

Nor Yerznka (Armenian: Նոր Երզնկա) is a village in the Ashtarak Municipality of the Aragatsotn Province of Armenia.
