= Kotayk Province =

Province of Armenia

Kotayk Կոտայք
- Province
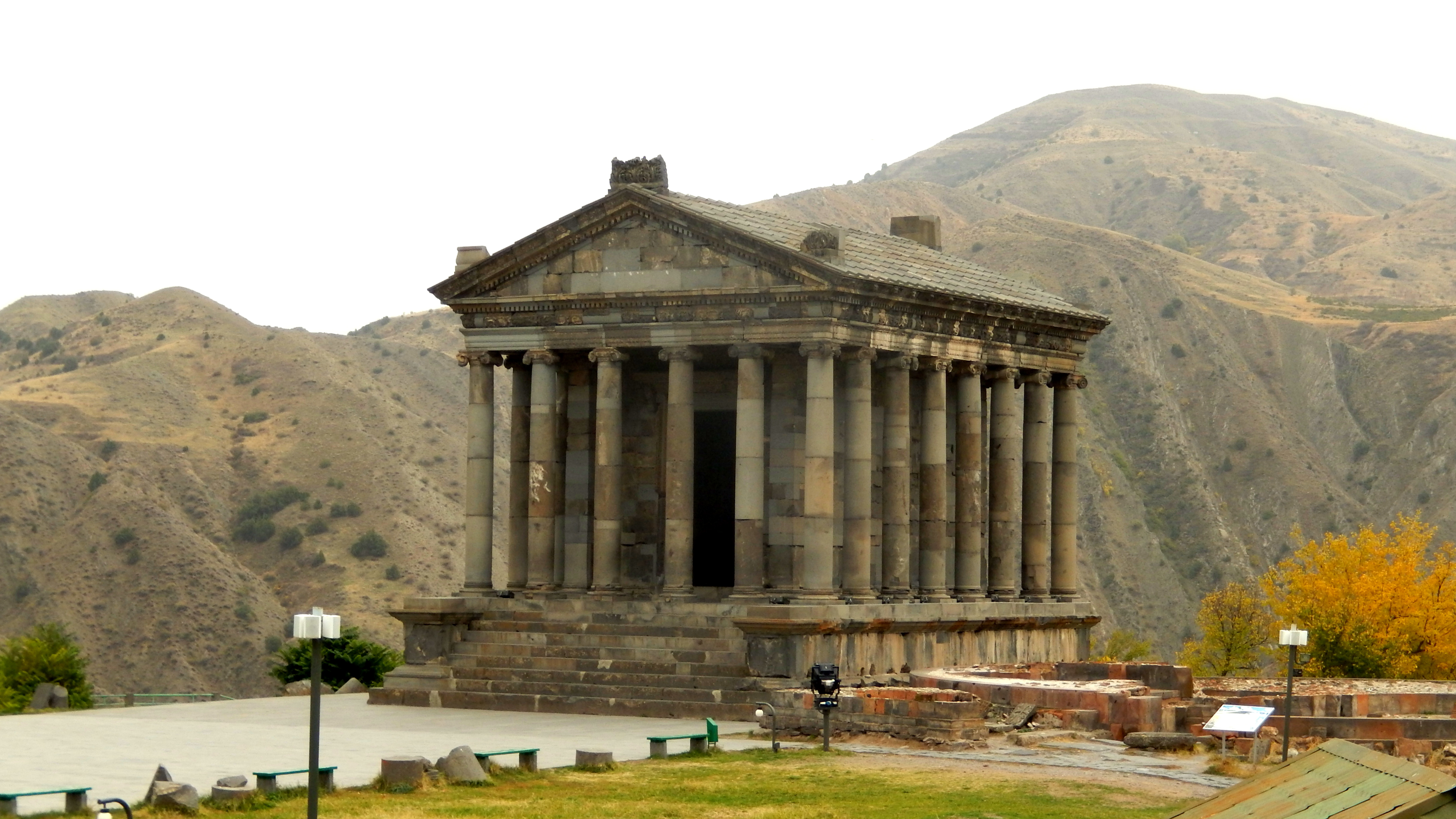
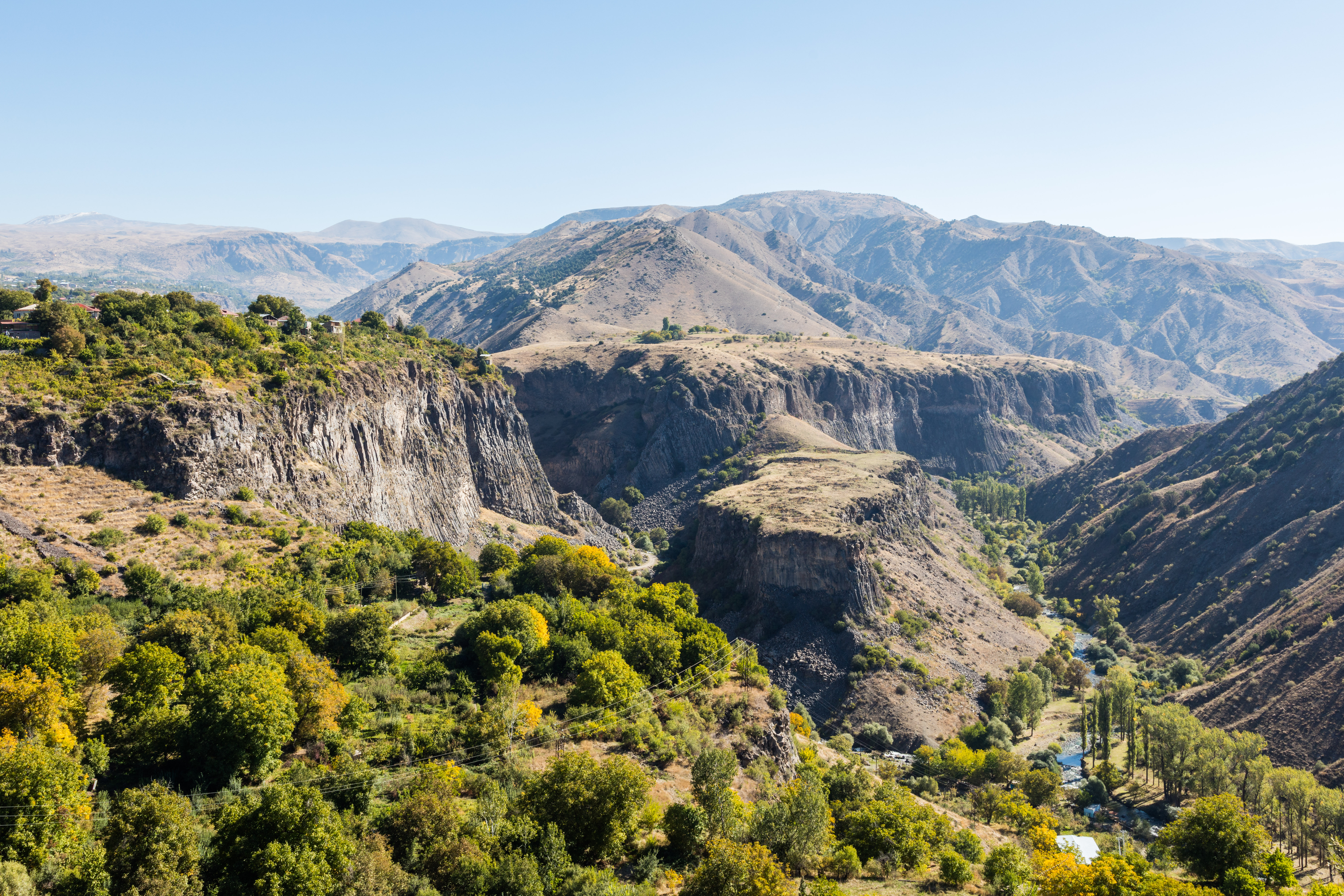
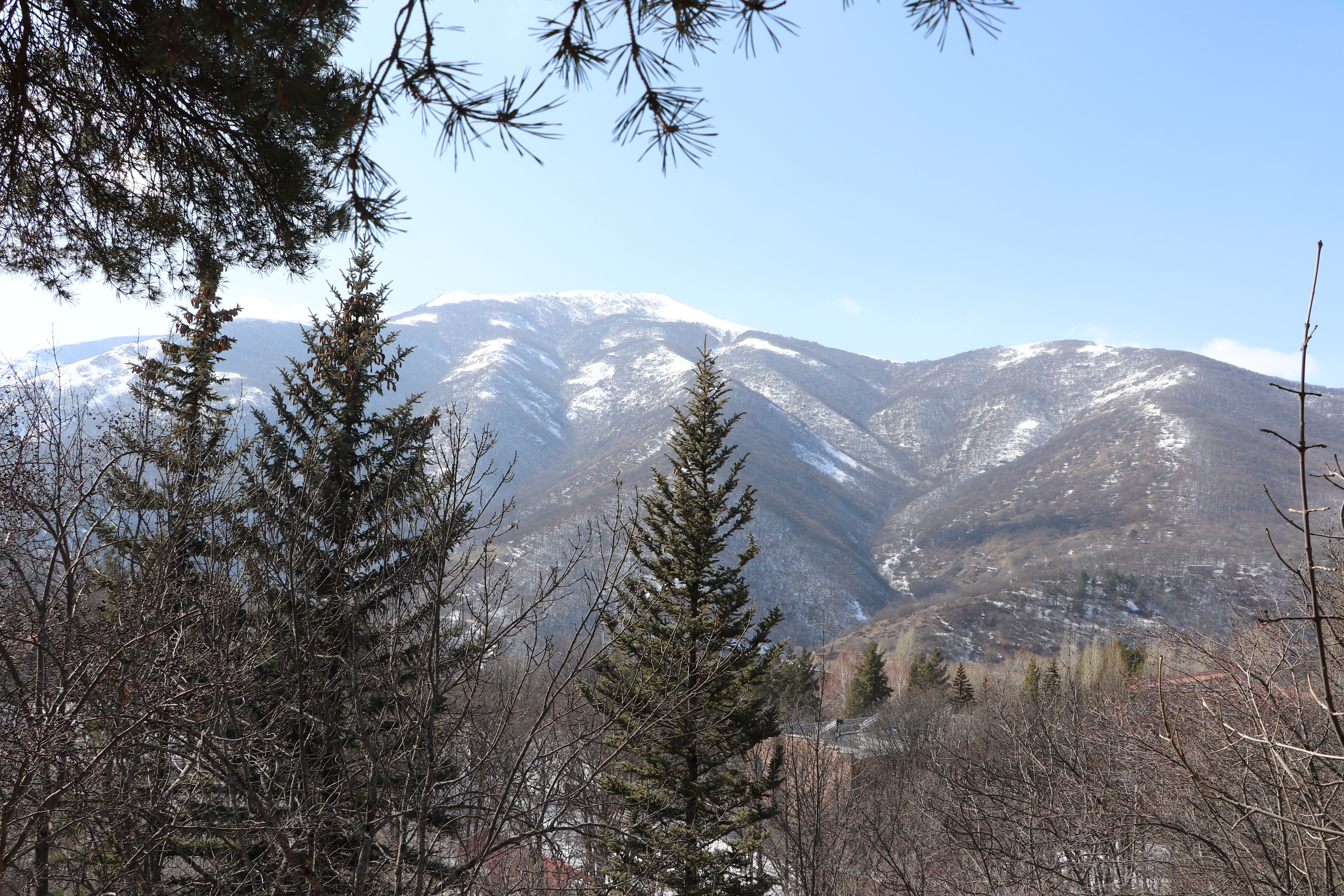
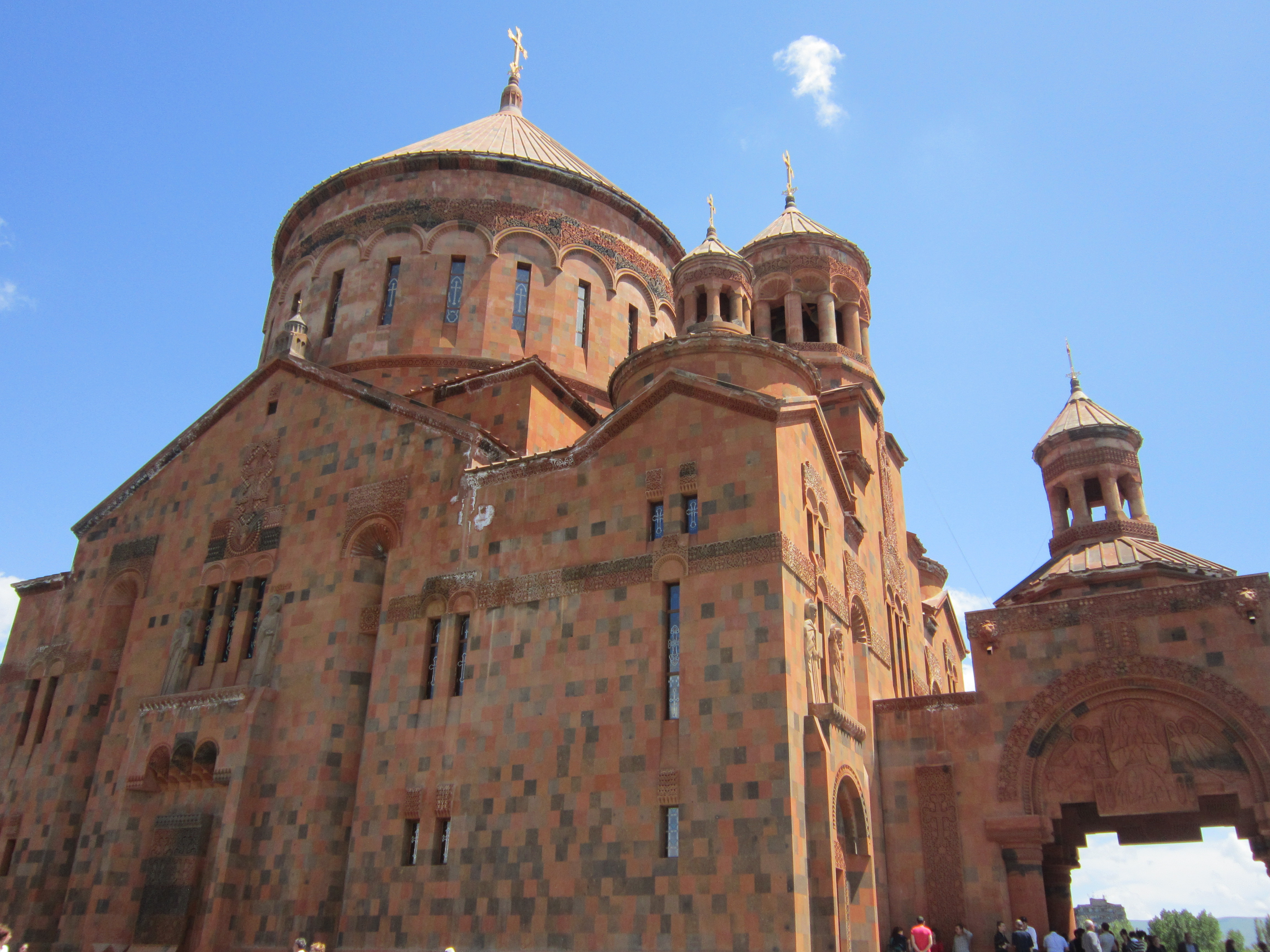
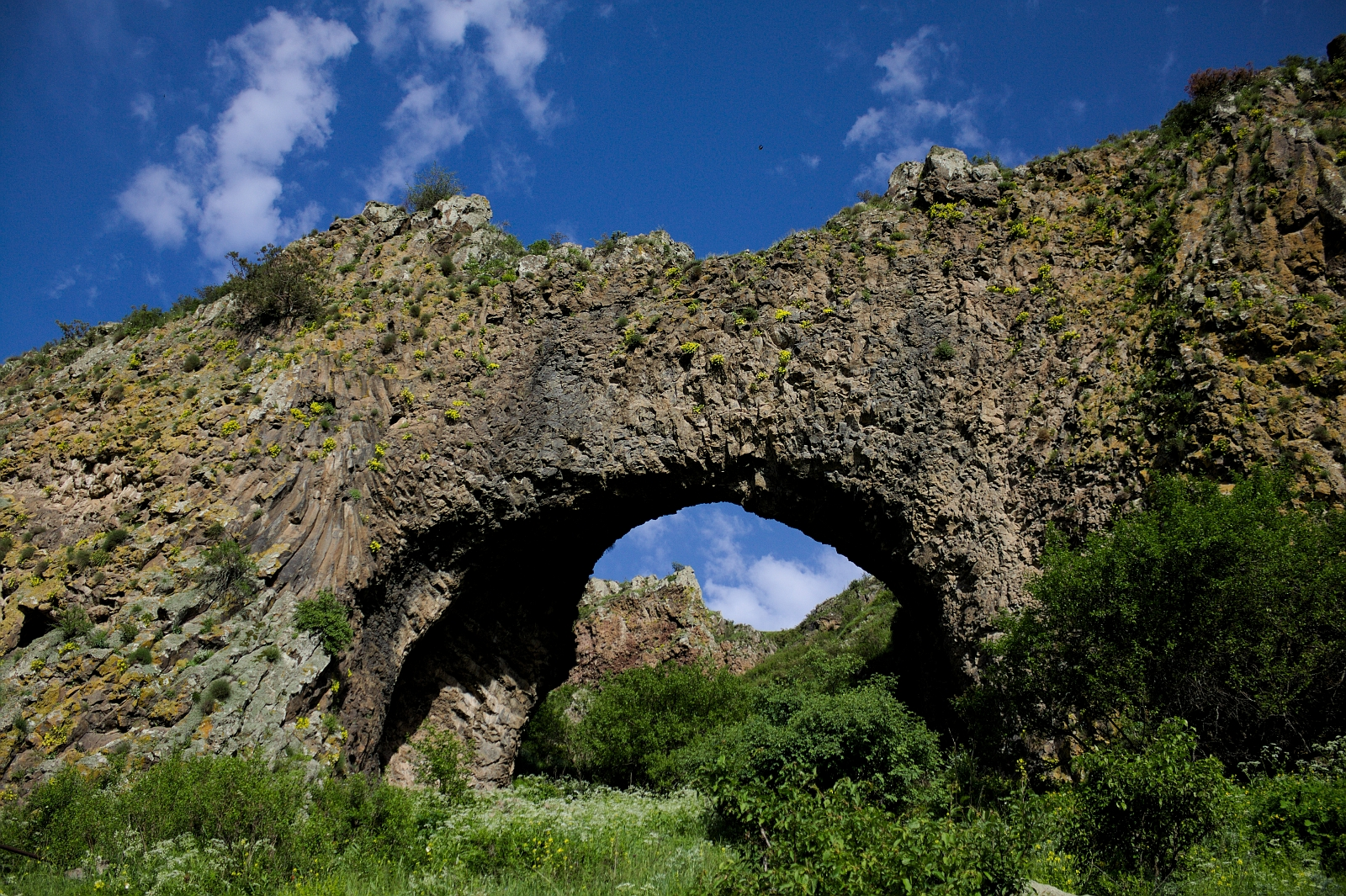
- From the top, Garni Temple, Garni Gorge, Arzakan-Meghradzor Sanctuary, Saint John the Baptist Church in Abovyan, Rock Formation Kotayk Province administration in Hrazdan

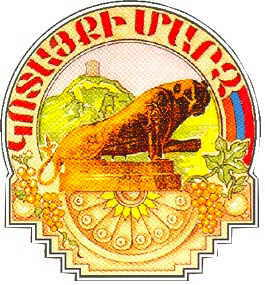
- Coat of arms

- Location of Kotayk within Armenia
- Coordinates: 40°25′N 44°45′E
- Country: Armenia
- Capital Largest city: Hrazdan; Abovyan

Government
  - Governor: Aharon Sahakyan

Area
  - Total: 2,076 km^{2} (802 sq mi)
  - Rank: 8th

Population (2025)
  - Total: 353,676
  - Rank: 2nd
  - Density: 170.4/km^{2} (441.2/sq mi)

GDP
  - Total: ֏346.843 billion (US$719 million)
  - Per capita: ֏1,375,270 (US$2,851)
- Time zone: AMT (UTC+04)
- Postal code: 2201–2506
- ISO 3166 code: AM-KT
- FIPS 10-4: AM05
- HDI (2022): 0.792 high · 2nd
- Website: Official website

Kotayk (Armenian: Կոտայք, Armenian pronunciation: [kɔˈtɑjkʰ]), is a province (marz) of Armenia. It is located at the central part of the country. Its capital is Hrazdan and the largest city is Abovyan. It is named after the Kotayk canton of the historic Ayrarat province of Ancient Armenia.

Kotayk is bordered by Lori Province from the northwest, Tavush Province from the north, Gegharkunik Province from the north, Aragatsotn Province from the southwest, and Ararat Province from the southwest and the capital Yerevan from the west. Kotayk is the only province in Armenia that has no borders with foreign countries.

The province is home to many ancient landmarks and tourist attractions in Armenia including the 1st-century Garni Temple, the medieval Bjni Fortress, 11th-century Kecharis Monastery and the 13th-century monastery of Geghard. Kotayk is also home to the popular winter sports resort and the spa-town of Tsaghkadzor and the mountain resort of Aghveran.

== Etymology and symbol ==
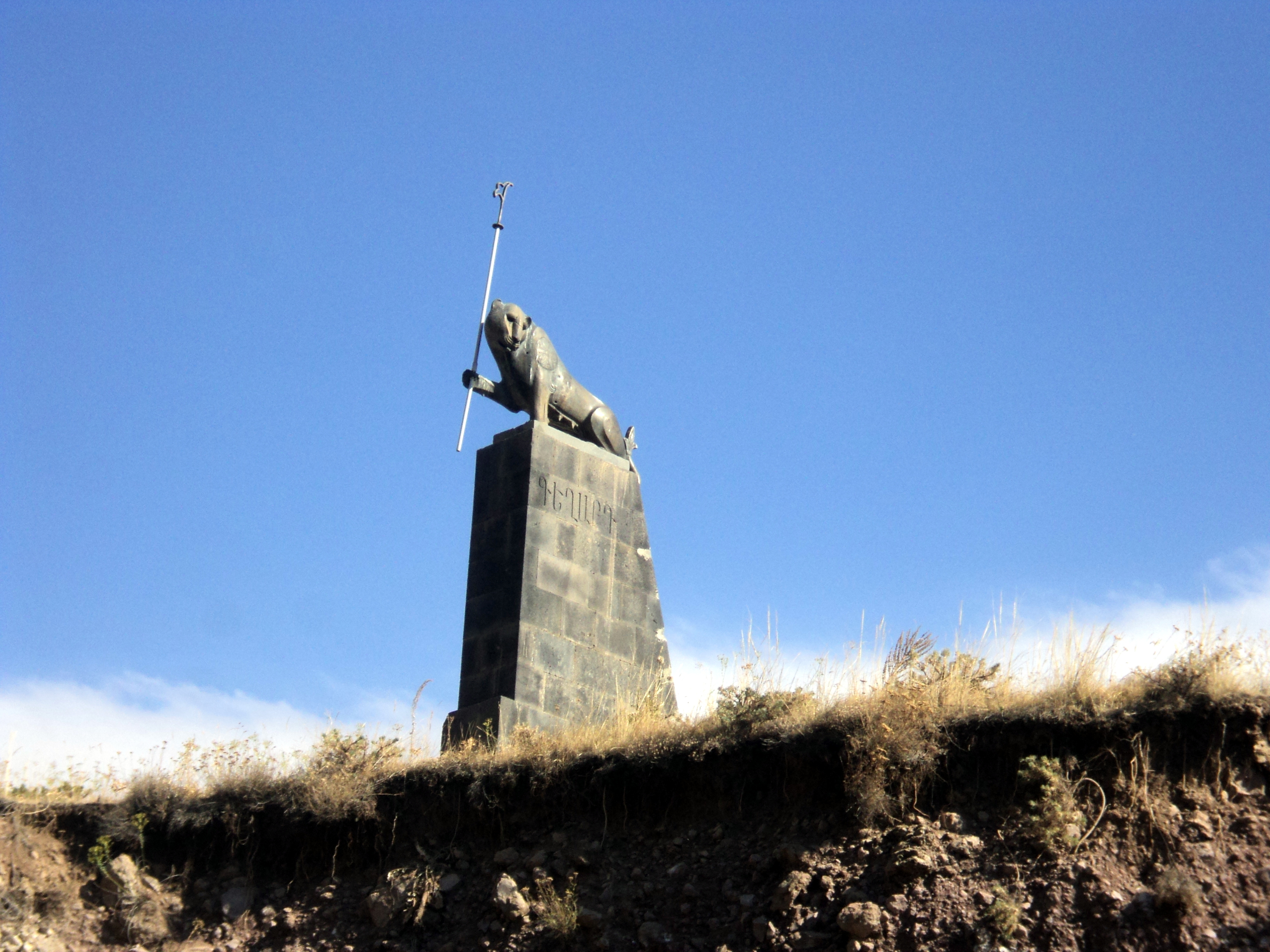
The lion of Geghard

Kotayk Province is named after the historic Kotayk canton of the historic Ayrarat province of Ancient Armenia, directly ruled by the royal Arsacid dynasty.

Kotayk was first mentioned as an Armenian region by Ptolemy as Kotakene (Κοτακηνή in greek). According to Movses Khorenatsi, the name Kotayk is derived from an ancient nearby settlement called Kutis.

The symbol of Kotayk is the lion of Geghard depicted on the coat of arms of the province, standing on a traditional Armenian sundial from Kecharis Monastery, surround by a bunch of Armenian grapes from both sides. The decorative statue of the lion of Geghard was erected in 1958 among the mountains of Kotayk, on the way to the 4th-century Geghard monastery. It is derived from the decorative lions carved on the walls of the monastery. The 1st-century pagan Temple of Garni is also depicted on the coat of arms of Kotayk.

== Geography ==
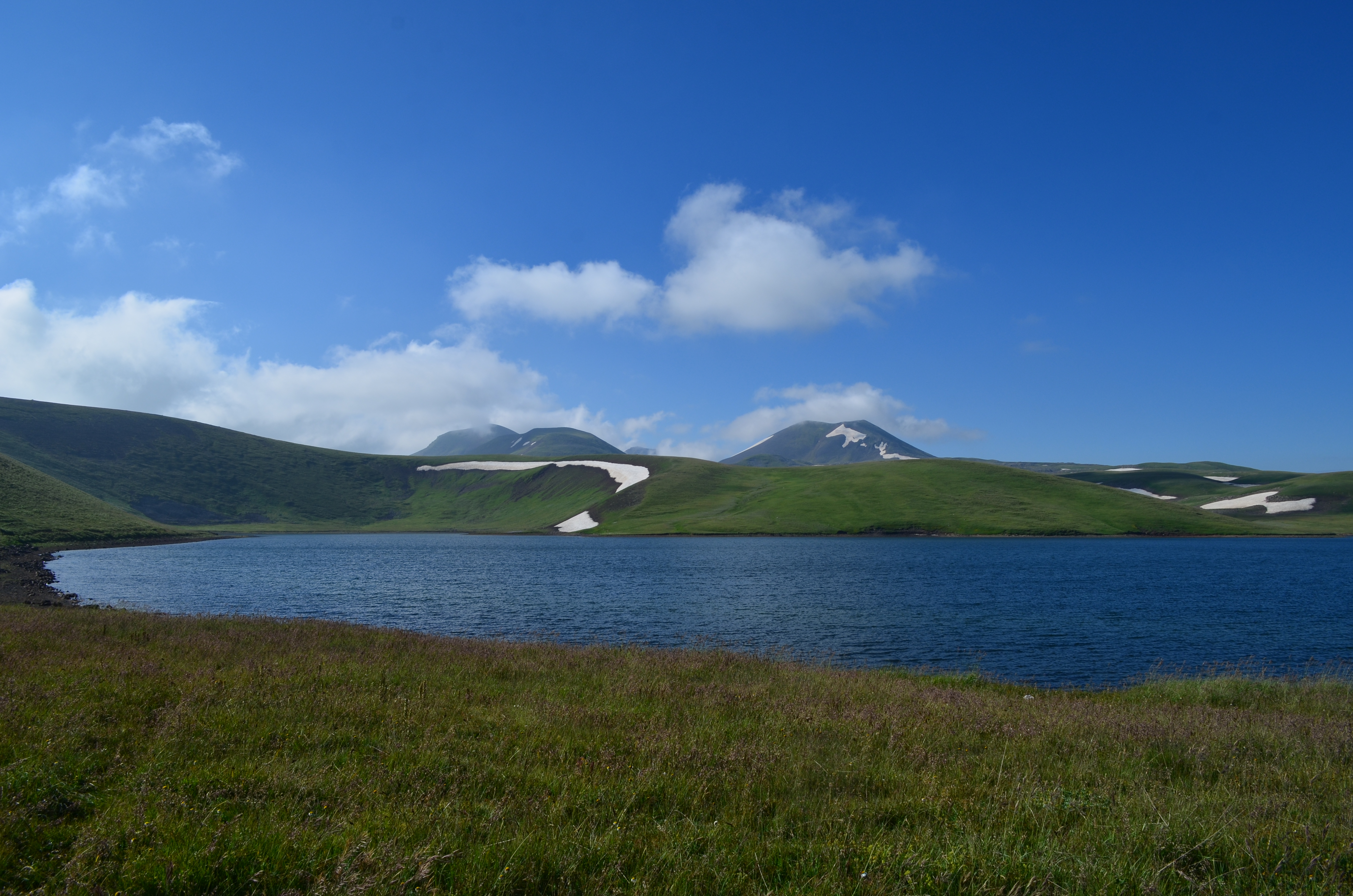
Lake Akna in the east of Kotayk

Situated at the central part of modern-day Armenia, Kotayk covers an area of 2,089 km^{2} (807 sq mi) (7% of total area of Armenia). It is bordered by Gegharkunik Province from the east, Tavush Province from the northeast, Lori Province from the north, Aragatsotn Province from the west, Ararat Province from the south and the capital Yerevan from the southwest.

Historically, the current territory of the province mainly occupies parts of the Aragatsotn, Kotayk, Varazhnunik and Mazaz cantons of Ayrarat province of Ancient Armenia.

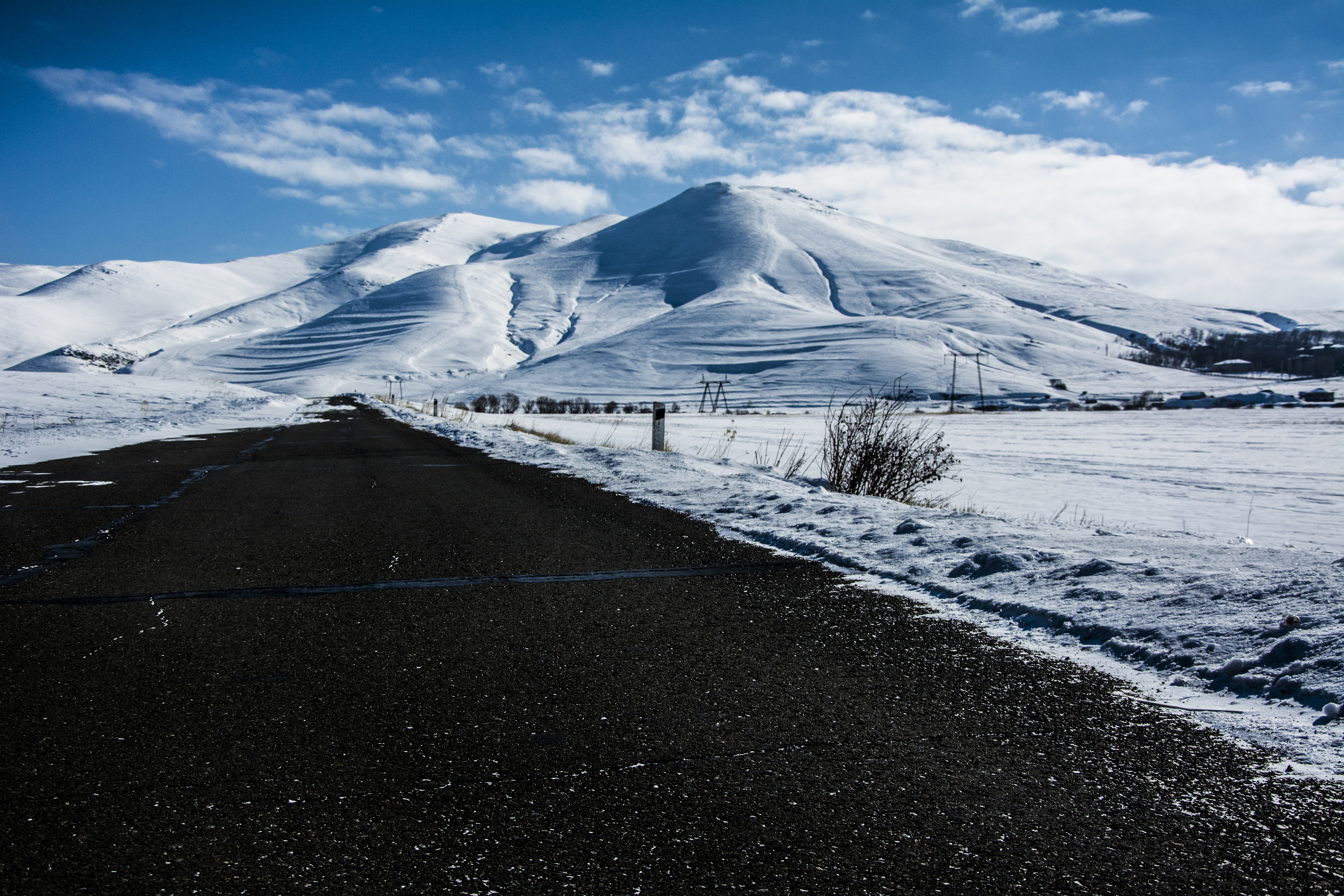
Mount Hatis (2528 m.)

Kotayk occupies the northeastern part of the Ararat plain. The Kotayk plain located between Hrazdan and Azat rivers has a height of 1,200–1,500 m (3,937–4,921 ft) above sea level. It is dominated by the Gegham mountains from the northeast including the mountains of Azhdahak, Hatis and Gutanasar. The province approximates the Pambak mountains at the north, while the Tsaghkunyats mountains lie at the west, and the Voghjaberd mountains at the southwest of Kotayk.

Affected by the Gegham volcanoes, the land relief of Kotayk is covered with lava and tufa.

Hrazdan, Getar and Azat are the three major rivers of the province. Lake Akna located at a height of 3,032 m (9,948 ft), is the only lake in the province.

The climate of the province is quite diversified. It ranges between arid and semi-arid climate at the south, and snowy climate at the centre and the north. Annual precipitation levels are less than 200 mm (7.9 in) at the dry areas, while it ranges between 400 and 900 mm (35.4 in) at the heights in the centre and the north of the province.

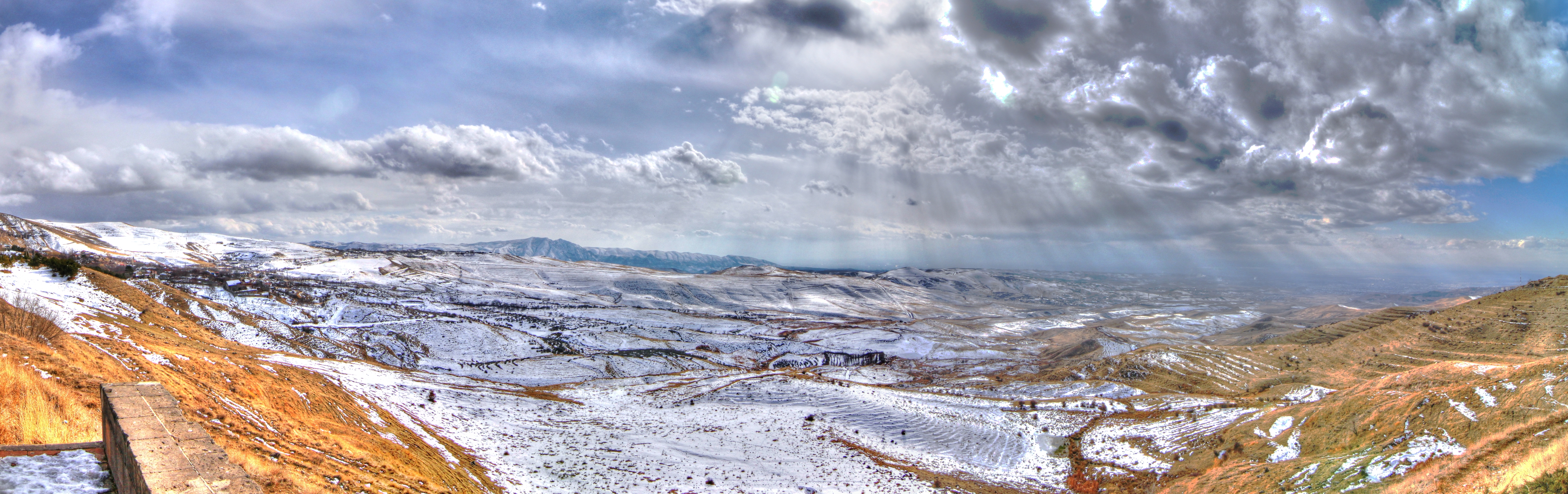
View of the Voghjaberd mountains at the southeast of Kotayk

== History ==
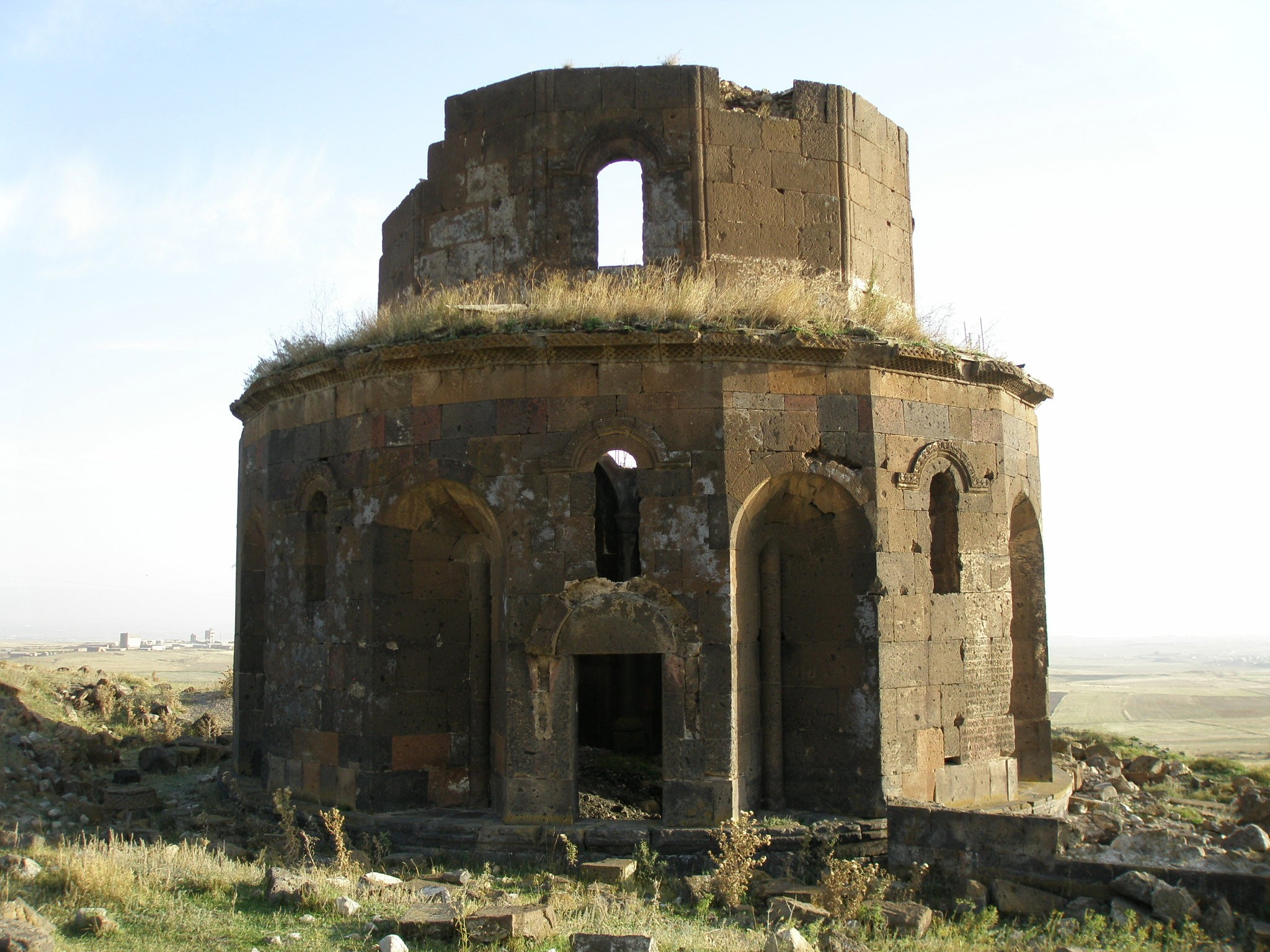
The ruins of Gharghavank of the 7th century

The earliest records about the region date back to the 1st and 2nd centuries AD. According to Ptolemy, Kotayk was directly ruled by the Arsacid kings of Armenia. However, during the 4th and the 5th centuries, the territories were granted to the Varazhnuni noble family who governed the forests and lands used as a hunting ground by the kings of the Arsacid kings. Later between the 5th and 7th centuries, the region was granted to the Kamsarakan and Amatuni families, under the Persian rule. Between the 7th and 9th centuries, Armenia suffered from the Arab Islamic occupation.

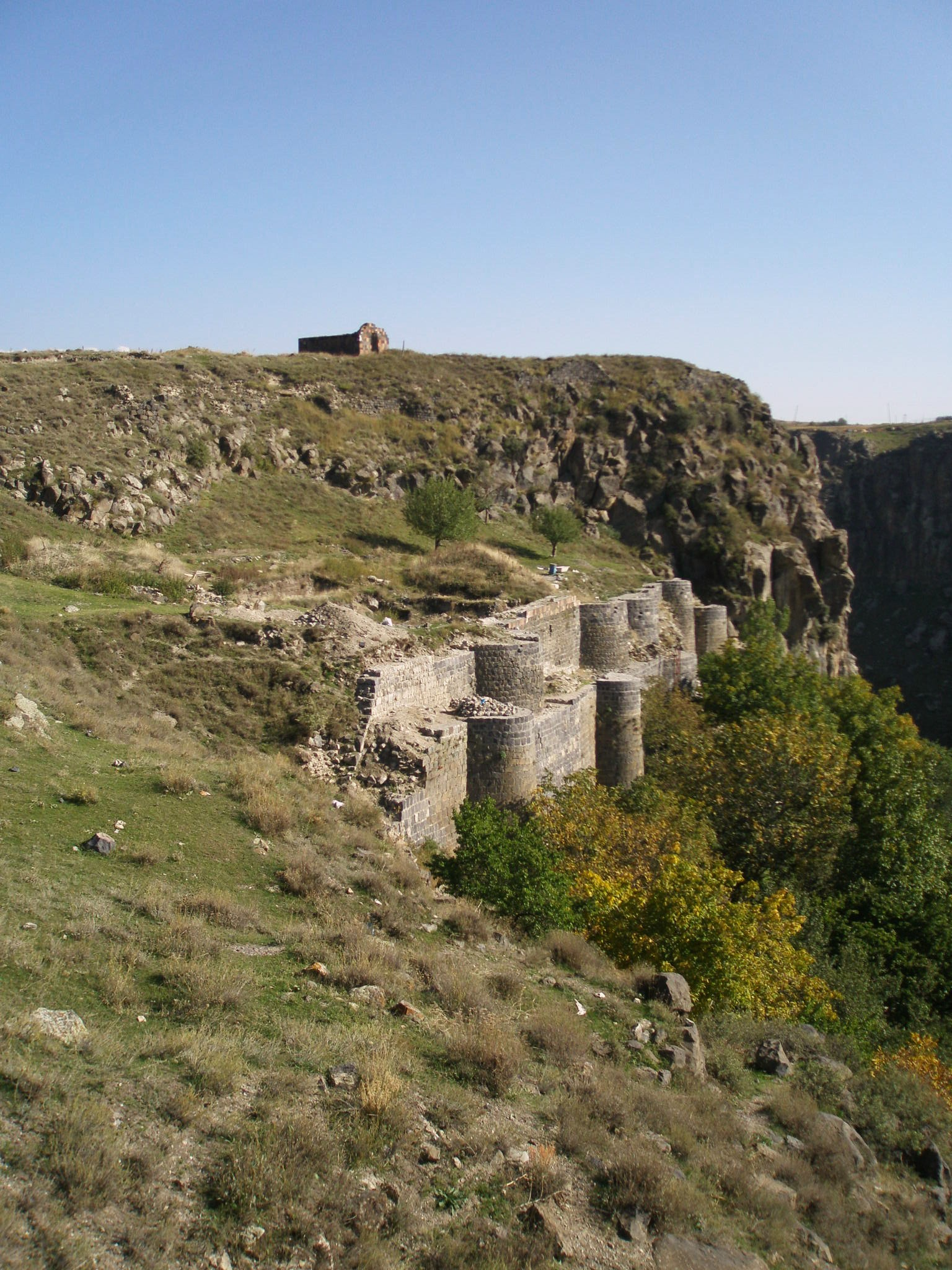
Bjni Fortress of the Bagratid period, 9th century

By the end of the 9th century, the region became part of the newly established Bagratid Kingdom of Armenia. Between the 11th and 15th centuries, the region suffered from the Seljuk, Mongol, Ag Qoyunlu and Kara Koyunlu invasions, respectively.

At the beginning of the 16th century, the territory of modern-day Kotayk became part of the Erivan Beglarbegi within the Safavid Persia. During the first half of the 18th century, the territory became part of the Erivan Khanate under the rule of the Afsharid dynasty and later under the Qajar dynasty of Persia. It remained under the Persian rule until 1827–1828, when Eastern Armenia was ceded to the Russian Empire as a result of the Russo-Persian War of 1826–28 and the signing of the Treaty of Turkmenchay. With the fall of the Russian Empire and after the decisive Armenian victories over the Turks in the battles of Sardarabad, Abaran, and Gharakilisa, the region became part of the independent Armenia in May 1918.

After 2 years of brief independence, Armenia became part of the Soviet Union in December 1920. After the World War II, Kotayk witnessed major growth and development under the soviet rule. Many new urban settlements and industrial centres were established in the region, including the towns of Byureghavan (1945), Charentsavan (1947), Nor Hachn (1953), Hrazdan (1959) and Abovyan (1963). Thus Kotayk had gradually become a major industrial region within the Armenian SSR.

Between 1930 and 1995, modern-day Kotayk was divided into 3 raions: Kotayk raion, Nairi raion, and Hrazdan raion. With the territorial administration reform of 1995, the 3 raions were merged to form the Kotayk Province.

== Demographics ==
=== Population ===
According to the 1989 Soviet census, the Kotayk Province (then part of the Kotayk, Nairi, and Hrazdan districts in 1930–1995) had a population of 301,737. 153,410 or 50.84% of which was urban, distributed in the cities of Abovyan (58,671), Hrazdan (60,839), and Charentsavan (33,900), and 148,327 or 49.16% were rural, distributed in the districts of Kotayk (63,099), Nairi (56,325), and Hrazdan (28,903).

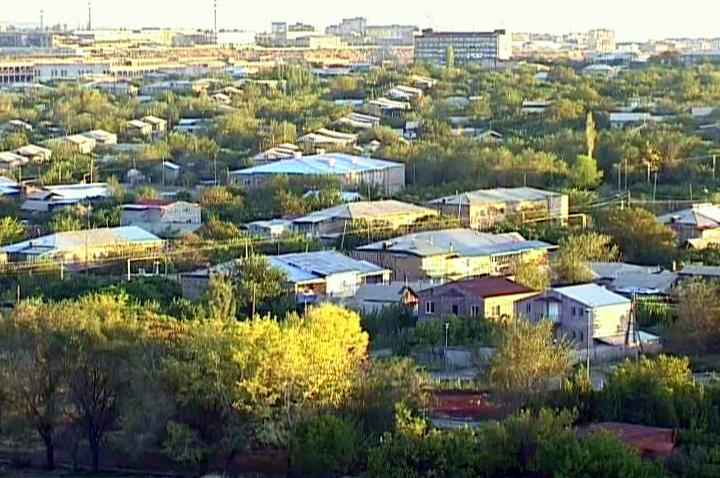
Zovuni village has a majority of Armenians, along with Yazidi and Molokan minorities

According to the 2022 official census, Kotayk has a population of 269,883 (128,793 men and 141,090 women), forming around 9.2% of the entire population of Armenia. The urban population is 146,273 (54.2%) and the rural is 123,610 (45.8%). The province has 7 urban and 60 rural communities. The largest urban community is the town of Abovyan, with a population of 46,434. The other urban centres are Hrazdan, Charentsavan, Yeghvard, Byureghavan, Nor Hachn, and Tsaghkadzor.

With a population of 7,198, the village of Jrvezh is the largest rural municipality of Kotayk.

=== Ethnic groups and religion ===
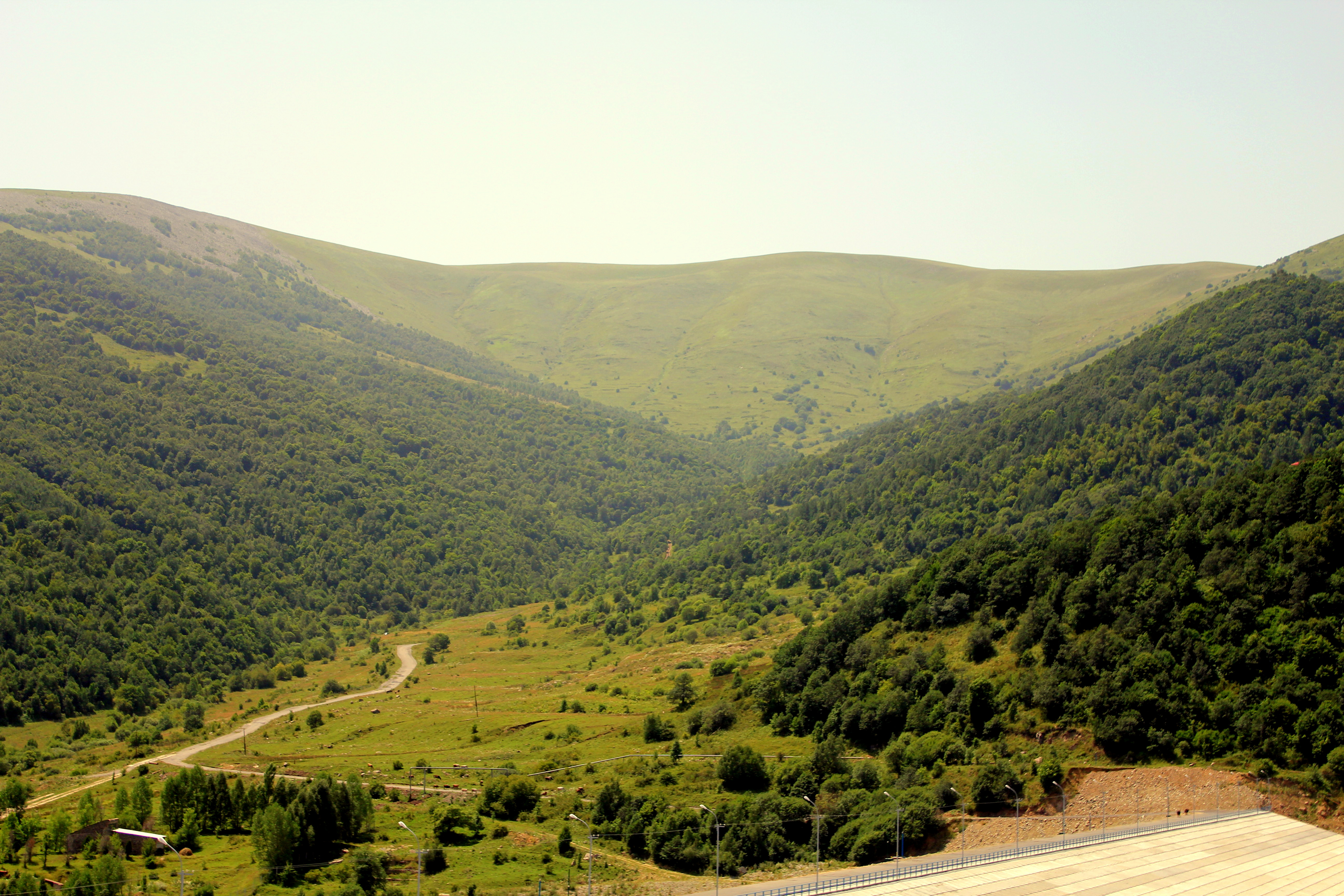
Artavaz

The majority of Kotayk Province are ethnic Armenians who belong to the Armenian Apostolic Church. The regulating body of the church is the Diocese of Kotayk, headed by Archbishop Arakel Karamyan. The Kecharis Monastery in Tsaghkadzor is the seat of the diocese.

However, small communities of Yazdis in Zovuni, Bjni, Getamej, and Dzoraghbyur.

Zovuni and Alapars have a significant number of Russian Molokans.

Hankavan has a majority of Greeks, while the village of Arzni is predominantly populated by Assyrians.

Minor communities of Russian Molokans, Yazidis, Kurds, Assyrians and Greeks are also found in Abovyan and Byureghavan.

== Administrative divisions ==
As a result of the administrative reforms took place on 9 June 2017, Kotayk is currently divided into 42 municipal communities (hamaynkner), of which seven are urban and 35 are rural:

Municipality	Type	Area (km^{2})	Population (2022 census)	Centre	Included villages
Abovyan Municipality	Urban	11	72,949	Abovyan	
Byureghavan Municipality	Urban	36	11,378	Byureghavan	Jraber, Nurnus
Charentsavan Municipality	Urban	245	31,297	Charentsavan	Alapars, Aghveran, Arzakan, Bjni, Fantan, Karenis
Hrazdan Municipality	Urban	15	52,283	Hrazdan	
Nor Hachn Municipality	Urban	1	28,095	Nor Hachn	
Tsaghkadzor Municipality	Urban	4	5,893	Tsaghkadzor	
Yeghvard Municipality	Urban	206	34,600	Yeghvard	Aragyugh, Buzhakan, Saralanj, Zoravan, Zovuni
Akunk Municipality	Rural		8,485	Akunk	Hatis, Kaputan, Kotayk, Nor Gyugh, Sevaberd, Zar, Zovashen
Aramus Municipality	Rural			Aramus	
Arinj Municipality	Rural			Arinj	
Arzni Municipality	Rural		2,912	Arzni	
Argel Municipality	Rural			Argel	
Balahovit Municipality	Rural			Balahovit	
Garni Municipality	Rural		12,311	Garni	
Geghadir Municipality	Rural			Geghadir	
Geghard Municipality	Rural			Geghard	
Geghashen Municipality	Rural			Geghashen	
Goght Municipality	Rural			Goght	
Getamej Municipality	Rural			Getamej	
Getargel Municipality	Rural			Getargel	
Hatsavan Municipality	Rural			Hatsavan	
Jrarat Municipality	Rural			Jrarat	
Jrvezh Municipality	Rural		9,680	Jrvezh	Dzoraghbyur, Zovk
Kaghsi Municipality	Rural			Kaghsi	
Kamaris Municipality	Rural			Kamaris	
Kanakeravan Municipality	Rural			Kanakeravan	
Karashamb Municipality	Rural			Karashamb	
Kasagh Municipality	Rural			Kasagh	
Katnaghbyur Municipality	Rural			Katnaghbyur	
Lernanist Municipality	Rural			Lernanist	
Mayakovski Municipality	Rural			Mayakovski	
Meghradzor Municipality	Rural			Meghradzor	Aghavnadzor, Artavaz, Gorgoch, Hankavan, Marmarik, Pyunik
Mrgashen Municipality	Rural			Mrgashen	
Nor Artamet Municipality	Rural			Nor Artamet	
Nor Geghi Municipality	Rural			Nor Geghi	
Nor Yerznka Municipality	Rural			Nor Yerznka	
Proshyan Municipality	Rural			Proshyan	
Ptghni Municipality	Rural			Ptghni	
Solak Municipality	Rural			Solak	
Teghenik Municipality	Rural			Teghenik	
Verin Ptghni Municipality	Rural			Verin Ptghni	
Voghjaberd Municipality	Rural			Voghjaberd	

During the recent years, many rural settlements in Kotayk became abandoned, including the village of Saranist.

== Culture ==
The Hrazdan Drama Theatre was founded in 1953. The Hrazdan branch of the National Gallery of Armenia and the Geological Museum of Hrazdan are also among the prominent cultural institutions in the province.

The urban centres of Kotayk have their own cultural centres and public libraries.

The House-museum of Brothers Orbeli in Tsaghkadzor, is dedicated to the Armenian scientists Ruben, Levon and Joseph Orbeli.

The town of Yeghvard has a number of historic structures dating back to classical antiquity and the medieval period, including the "Seghanasar" ancient settlement from the 2nd millennium BC, the ruins of a 4th-century church surrounded with more than 30 khachkars dating back to the 12th century, the ruins of the 5th to 6th-centuries Katoghike Church, and the well-preserved Holy Mother of God Church of 1301.

=== Fortresses and archaeological sites ===
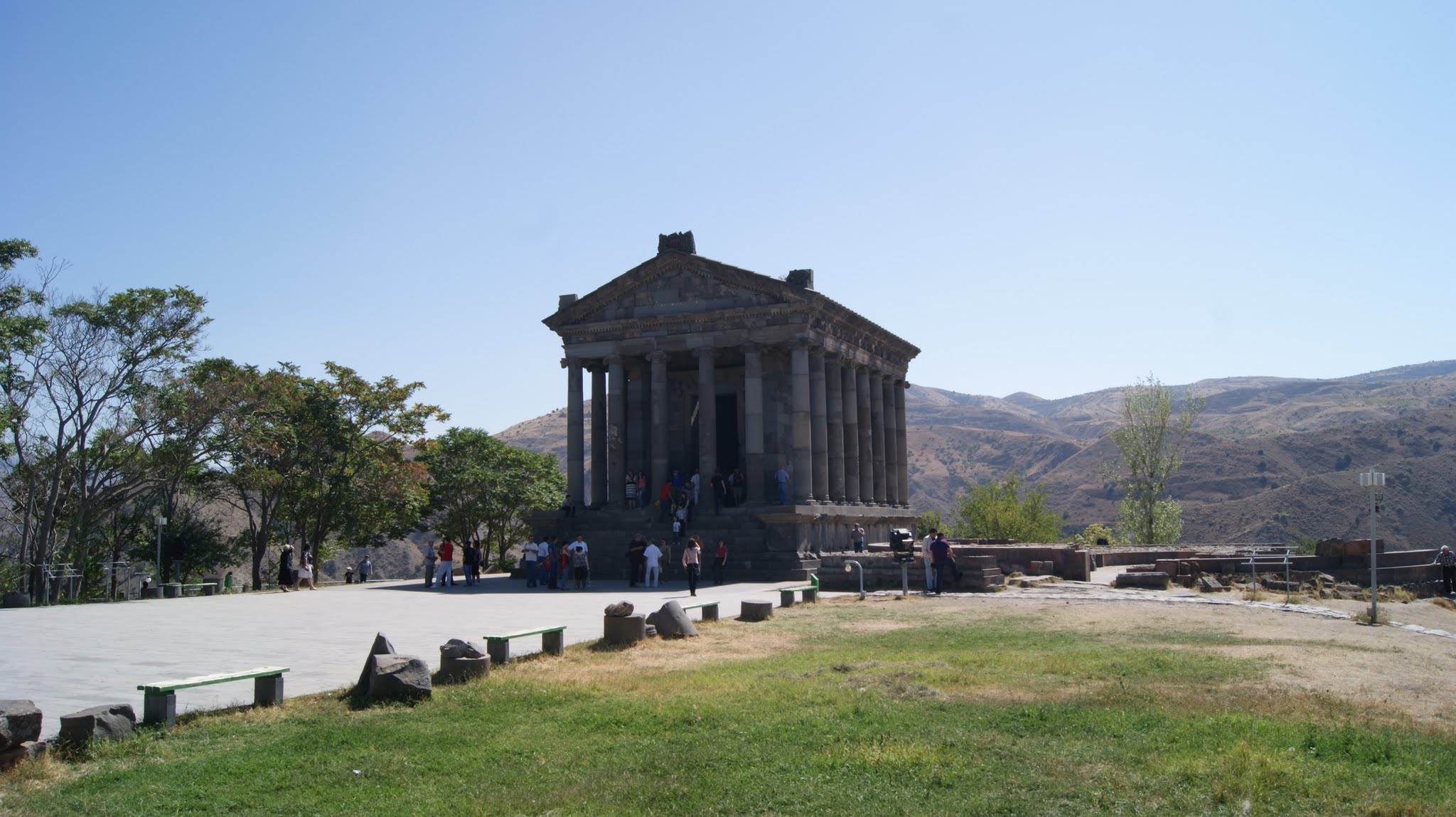
Garni Temple

- Astghaberd fortress of Hatis, medieval period
- Bjni Fortress of the 9th century
- Darani Cyclopean fortress, 2nd millennium BC
- Jrvezh fortress, 2nd millennium BC
- Seghanasar ancient settlement of Yeghvard, 2nd millennium BC
- Garni Temple of the 1st century AD

=== Churches and monasteries ===
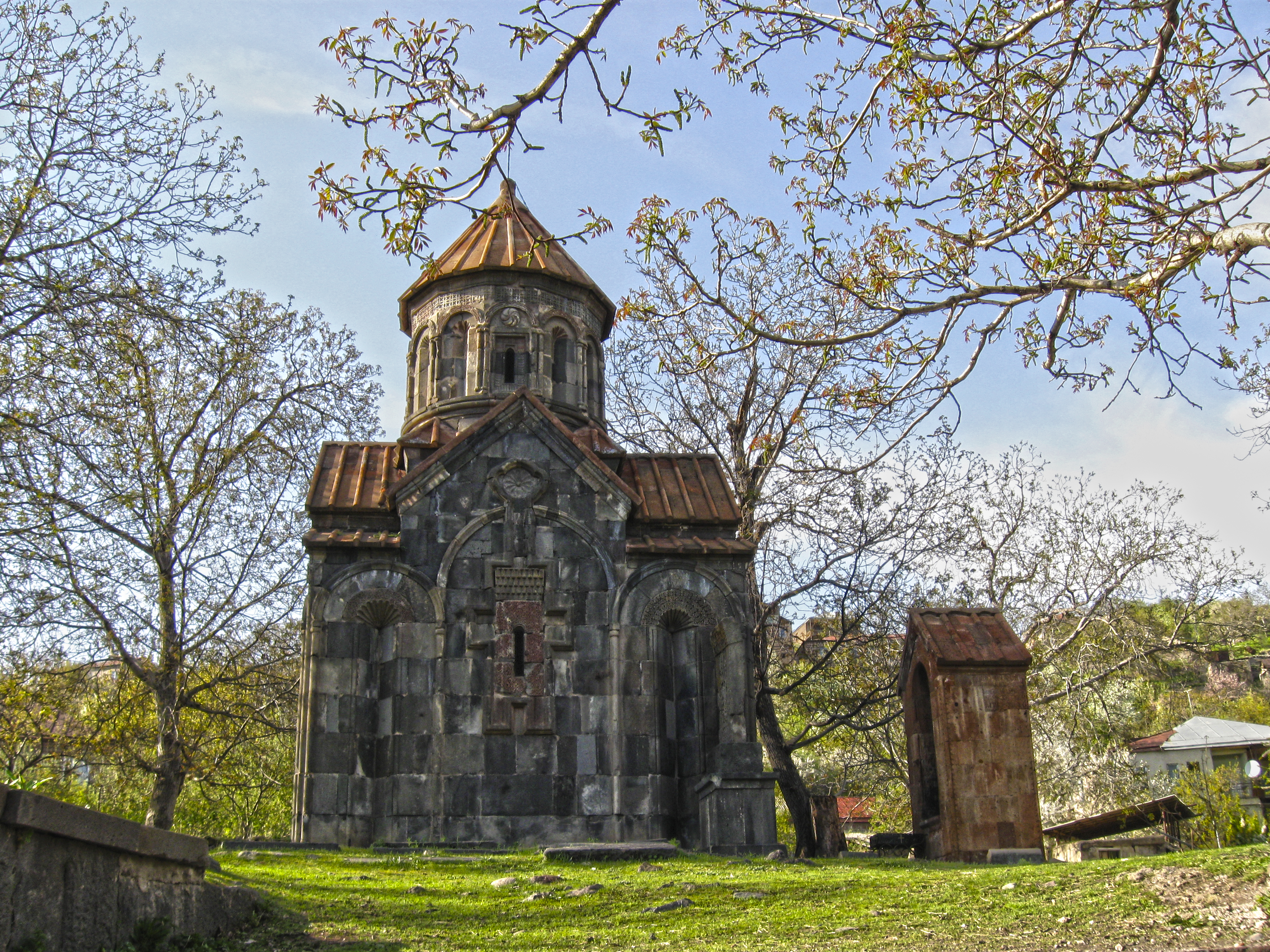
Mashtots Hayrapet Church

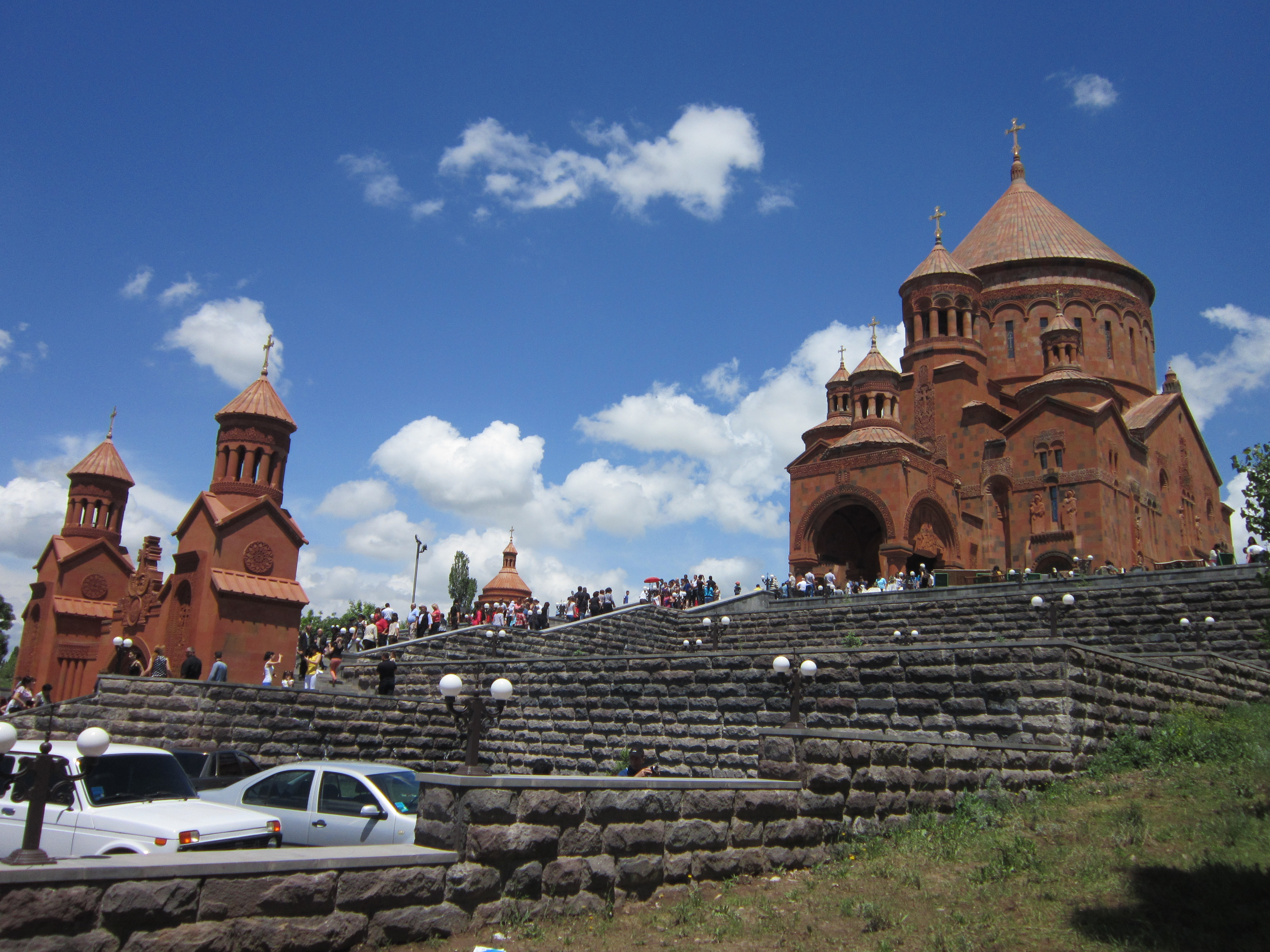
Surp Hovhannes church in Abovyan

- Artavaz Monastery of the 7th century
- Dzagavank Monastery of the 7th century
- Geghard monastery, founded in the 4th century
- Gharghavank monastery of the 7th century
- Havuts Tar monastery, 11th to 13th centuries
- Holy Mother of God church in Arinj of the 15th century
- Holy Mother of God church in Bjni of 1031
- Kaptavank Church of 1349
- Kecharis Monastery, 11th to 13th centuries
- Makravank Monastery,
- Mashtots Hayrapet Church of Garni of the 12th century
- Mayravank Monastery of the 7th century
- Neghuts Monastery of the 10th century
- Ptghnavank monastery, 6th to 7th centuries
- Surb Karapet church in Rndamal (Djrarat) village, 10th to 12th centuries, reconstructed and reopened in 2008
- Surp Hovhannes church of Abovyan opened in 2013
- Surp Kiraki church in Arzni of the 6th century
- Tejharuyk Monastery of the Georgian Orthodox Church, opened in 1199
- Teghenyats Monastery, 6th to 7th centuries
- Yeghvard Church of 1301

== Transportation ==
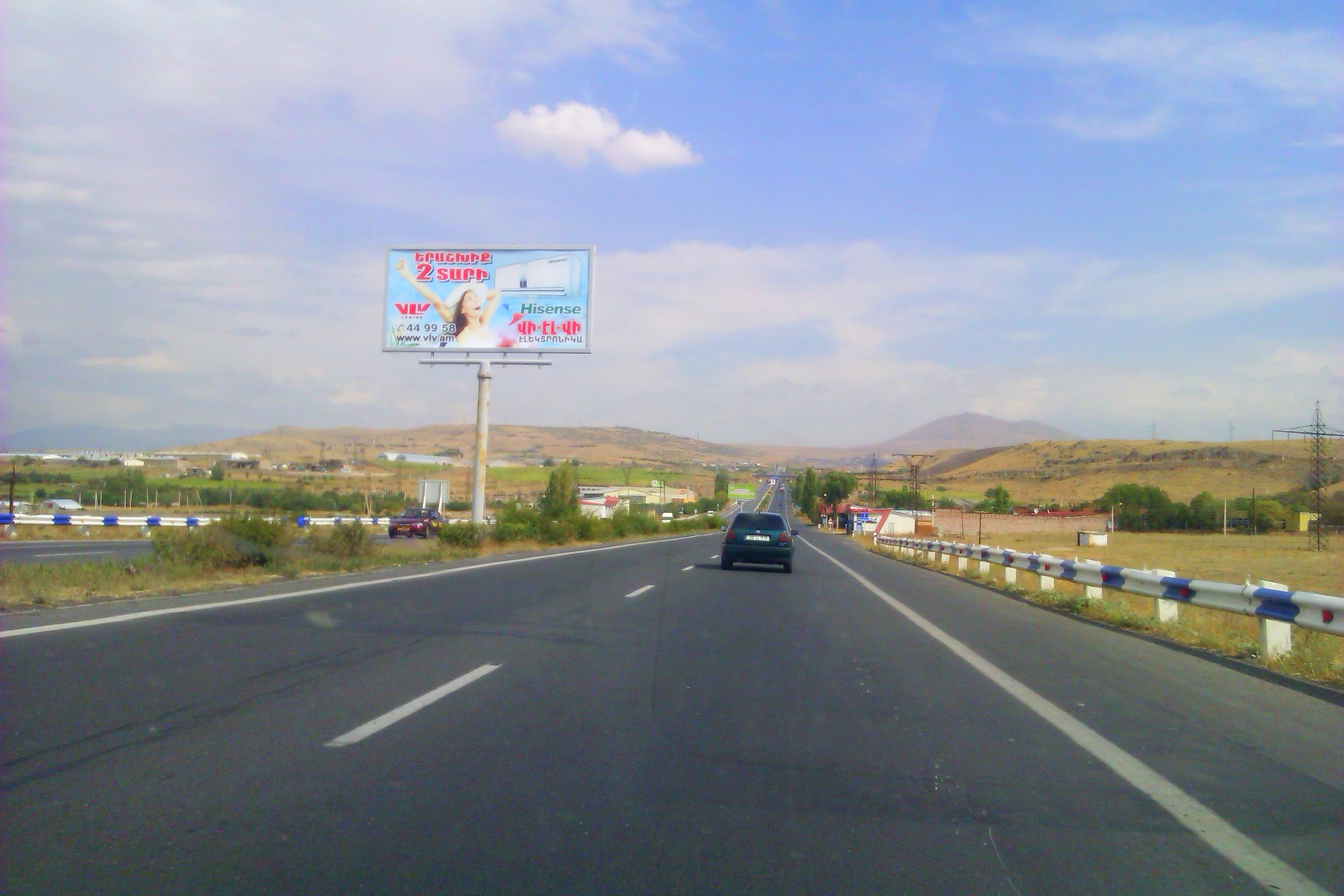
The M-4 Motorway passing through Kotayk

The M-4 Motorway connects the province with the rest of Armenia. The local urban and rural settlements are connected to each other with a well-developed network of roads.

Being very close to the capital Yerevan, the towns of Kotayk are regularly connected with the capital city through mini bus trips operating throughout the day.

== Economy ==
=== Agriculture ===
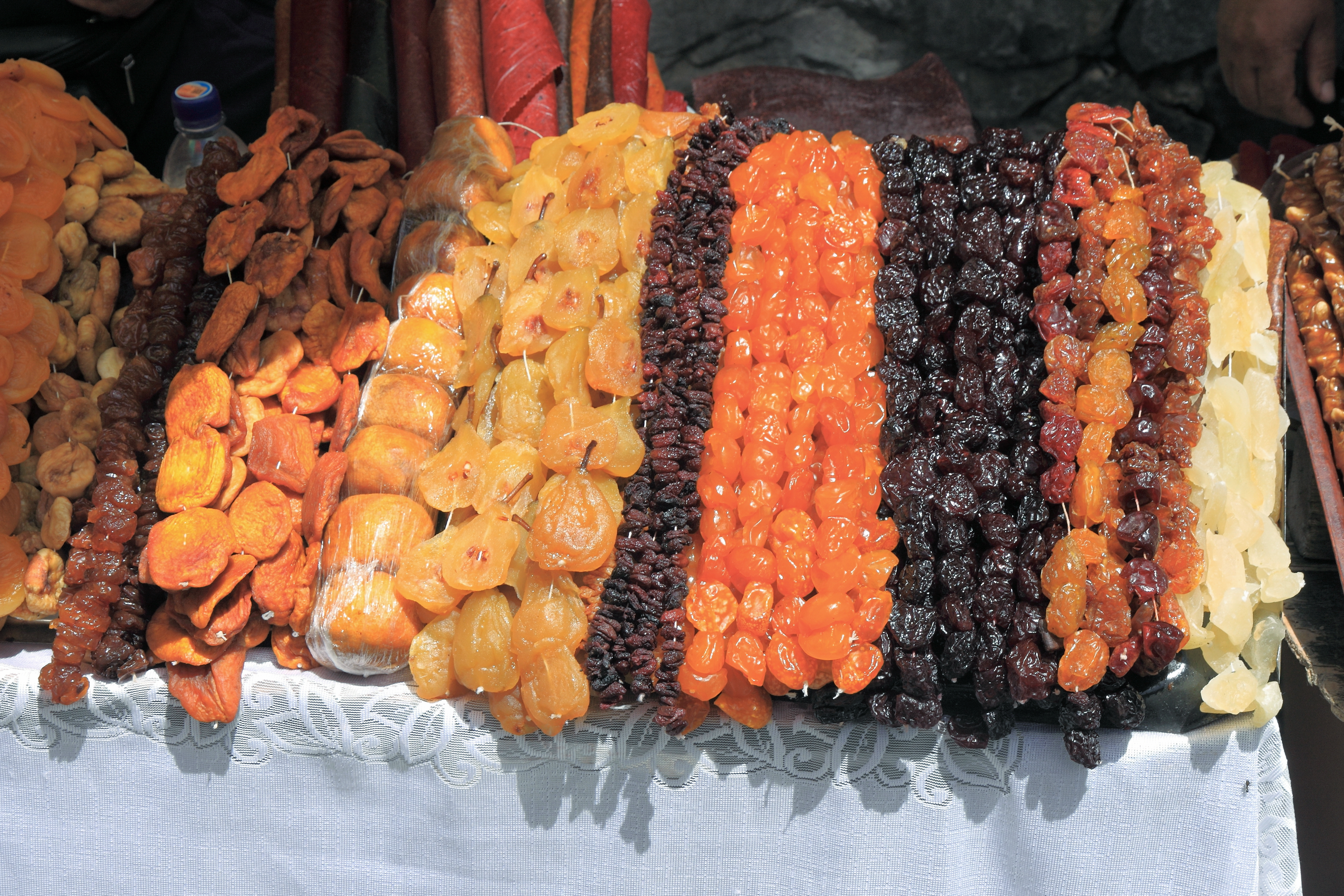
Dried fruits from Geghard

Kotayk is a major centre for agricultural products and cattle-breeding in Armenia, forming 6% of the annual total agricultural product of Armenia. Around 74% (1,546.4 km^{2}) of the total area of the province are arable lands, out of which 24.4% (378 km^{2}) are ploughed. A total of 36,125 farms in Kotayk are operated by the private sector or through cooperatives.

The agricultural products of the province are divided as follows: 40% provided by cattle-breeding 40%, 14% by tobacco processing, 10% by fruits, 8% by vegetables, 28% by other products including grains and dry grains. The orchards mainly produce grapes, apricot, peach and apple.

Around 40% of the farmlands are irrigated, mainly through the Kanaker Hydroelectric Power Station canal and the Kotayk canal of Sevan–Hrazdan Cascade.

Kotayk has the three largest poultry farms in Armenia including the farms of Lusakert (in Nor Geghi), Arzni and Getamej.

=== Industry ===
Kotayk was a major industrial centre during the Soviet period. The towns of Byureghavan, Charentsavan, Nor Hachn, Hrazdan and Abovyan were founded by the USSR government between the 1940s and the 1960s to promote the industrial capacity of the Armenian SSR. However, many industrial plants have been revived after the independence of Armenia, mainly during the first decade of the 21st century. Currently, the province has a contribution of 13.5% in the annual total industrial product of Armenia. Food-processing, alcoholic beverages and building materials production are the prevailing sectors in the industry of the province.

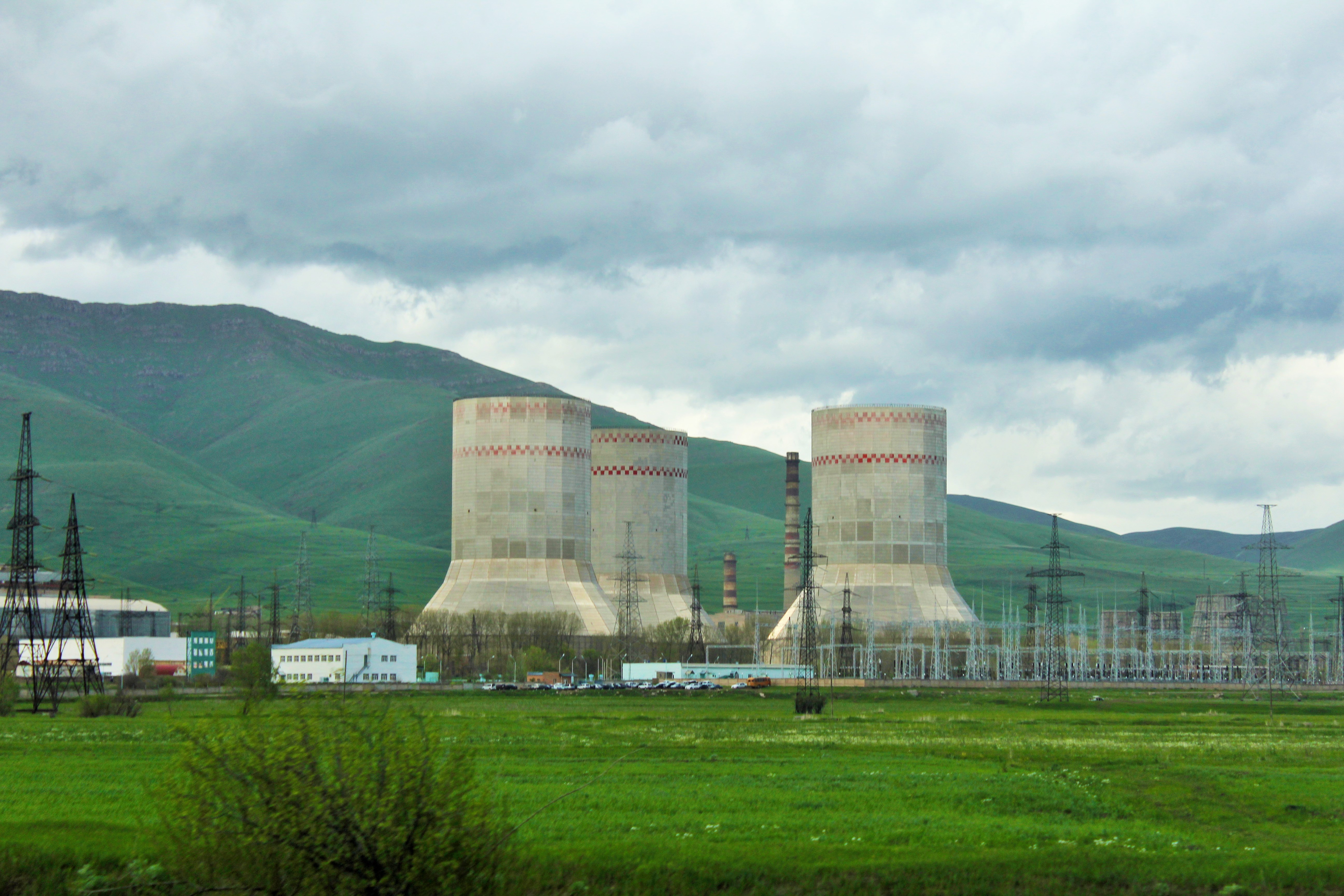
Hrazdan thermal power plant

- Hrazdan is the most industrialized town of Kotayk. The Hrazdan Hydro Power Plant opened in 1959, the Hrazdan Thermal Power Plant opened in 1966, and the Hrazdan Cement factory opened in 1970, are among the largest plants in Armenia. The Qualitech Machinery machine tool-plant was founded in 1999. The town has also minor industrial firms including Hidro Storm metal-plastic manufacturing plant founded in 2009, as well as Arjermek and Hakobyan plants for building materials.
- Charentsavan is another major industrial centre in Kotayk. The town is home to many types of industries including Dzulakentron metal casting plant founded in 1962, Charentsavan Precision Tool-Making Plant founded in 1964, Khorda Hydroturbines Manufacturing Enterprise founded in 2006, Bjni and Noy mineral waters factory founded in 2010, and Lubawa Armenia safety equipments production founded in 2014.
- Yeghvard has many major industrial plants, including Yeghvard Wine-Brandy Factory founded in 1966, Nairishin building materials plant founded in 1986, Yeghvard sport shoes factory founded in 1987, Yeghvard yeast plant founded in 1991, Yeghvard Combined Feed Factory founded in 1993, Semur & Co steel and metal manufacturing plant founded in 2003, and Shahnazaryan Wine-Brandy House founded in 2005. In 2016, the "Armoil" company for petroleum has built an oil refinery in Yeghvard. The town is also home to the "65 Military Factory" specialized in military products.
- Byureghavan is major industrial centre since the Soviet period. The town's largest firms were opened during the Soviet days, including Arzni Group mineral water plant founded in 1925 in Arzni and relocated to Byureghavan in 1974, Glass World enterprise for glass manufacturing founded in 1947, Almaqar stone-processing enterprise founded in 1971, and Sunenergashin reinforced concrete columns manufacturers founded in 1973. During the 1990s, Byuregh Alco Winery for wine, brandy and vodka (founded in 1996), and Varat stone crushing plant (founded in 1997) were opened.
- Abovyan has an industrial district located to the south of the town. It is home to Suardi Armenia factory for building materials since 1963, Samkon Brandy Factory since 1970 (privatized in 1998), the famous Kotayk Brewery founded in 1974, Poli-Serv factory for polymer products since 2001, Ginevan Winery for wine, brandy, beer and canned food since 2011, and Italasphalt LLC for asphalt and concrete production since 2015. Other major firms include Tamara factory for dairy products and sweets since 1988, Luma factory for meet products and chips since 1995, Armstone plant for building materials since 1996, Sipan canned food and soft drinks plant since 2003, and Tamara Food for convenience food since 2007.
- Nor Hachn is famous for its diamond cutting plants with many enterprises, including Shoghakn plant founded in 1958, Andranik plant founded in 1994, Arevakn plant founded in 2000, and Agates plant founded in 2001.
- Being located at the eastern suburbs of Yerevan, the village of Jrvezh is home to a large number of industrial firms, including Arega Cannery since 1995, Garni Crystalline water manufacturers since 1999, Jrvezh Meat Factory since 2006, Javale" factory for plastic products since 2008, and T-Pharma pharmaceuticals plant since 2017.
- The village of Balahovit is also home to several industrial firms, including Argishty mechanical enterprise since 1989, Saranist factory for glass containers since 1989, and Filishin LLC for concrete since 2007.

Other major industrial firms located in the villages of Kotayk include: Chanakh dairy factory founded in 1991 in Zovk, Glanzh Alco Winery for cognac and wine founded in 2003 in Aramus, Nicola International Armenia for canned food in Aramus (since 2003), Ptghni Gold Winery for wine and liquor founded in 1996 in Ptghni, Bacon factory for meet products founded in 1995 in Arzni, Multi Aquamarine for spring water since 2003 in Akunk, Aquastone spring water manufacturers in Bjni since 2012, Rukar Group for vodka and calvados since 2010 in Verin Ptghni, Helias Vineyards for wine production since 2013 in Dzoraghbyur, and Pacific Home for spring water production founded in 2014 in Akunk.

=== Tourism ===
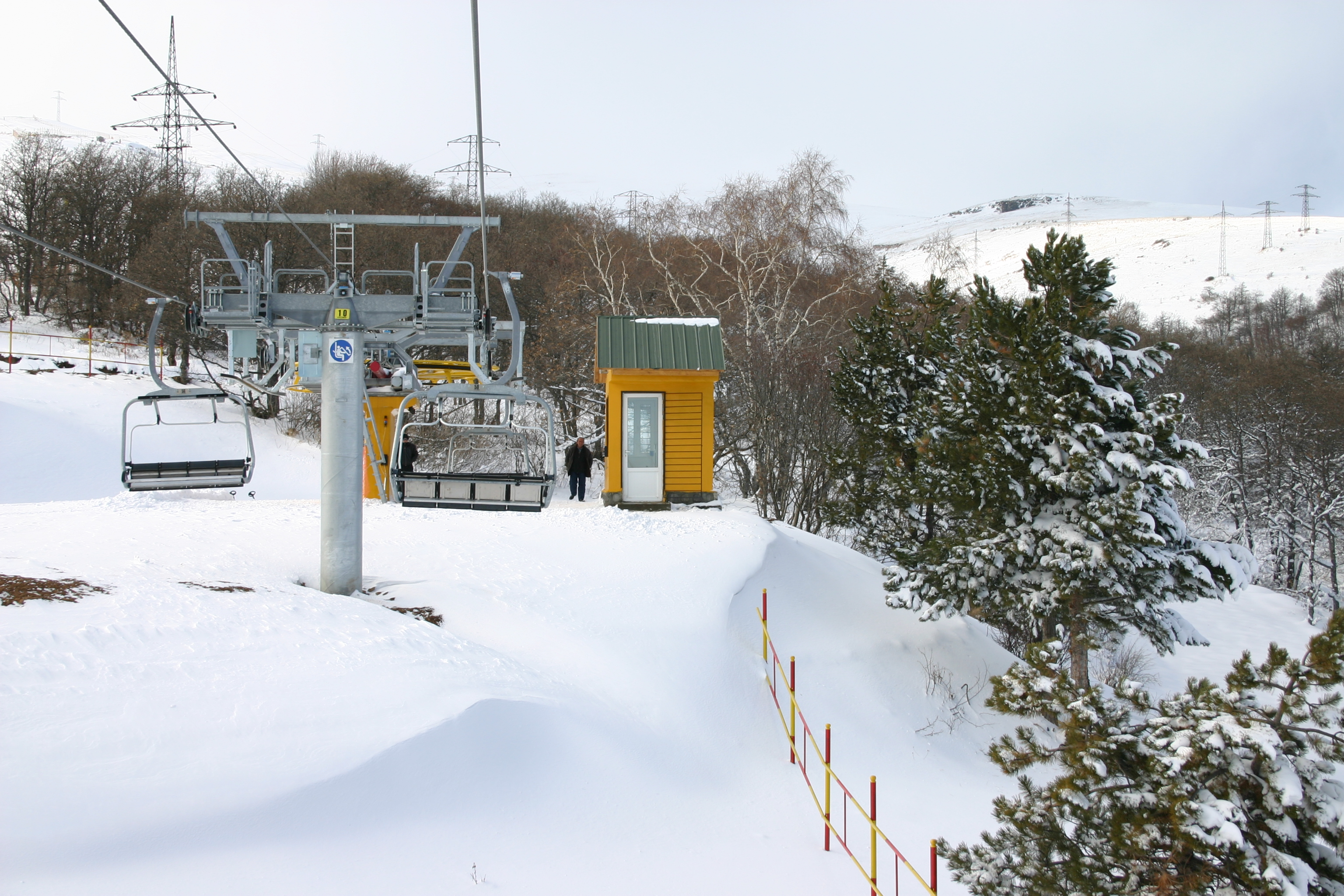
Tsaghkadzor ski resort

Tsaghkadzor spa town is a popular mountain resort in Kotayk with its several hotels and sanatoriums. The Tsaghkadzor ski resort is a major destination for the lovers of winter sports. Many 5-star luxury hotels and resorts serve the town during the summer and winter seasons including the Marriott Tsaghkadzor Hotel, Multi Rest House Hotel, Golden Palace Hotel and Ararat Resort Tsaghkadzor Hotel. The "Senator Golden Palace" casino of Tsaghkadzor is among the largest entertainment centers in Armenia.

The villages of Hankavan, Pyunik, Agveran, Bjni and Arzni are popular summer resorts and major destinations for medical tourism.

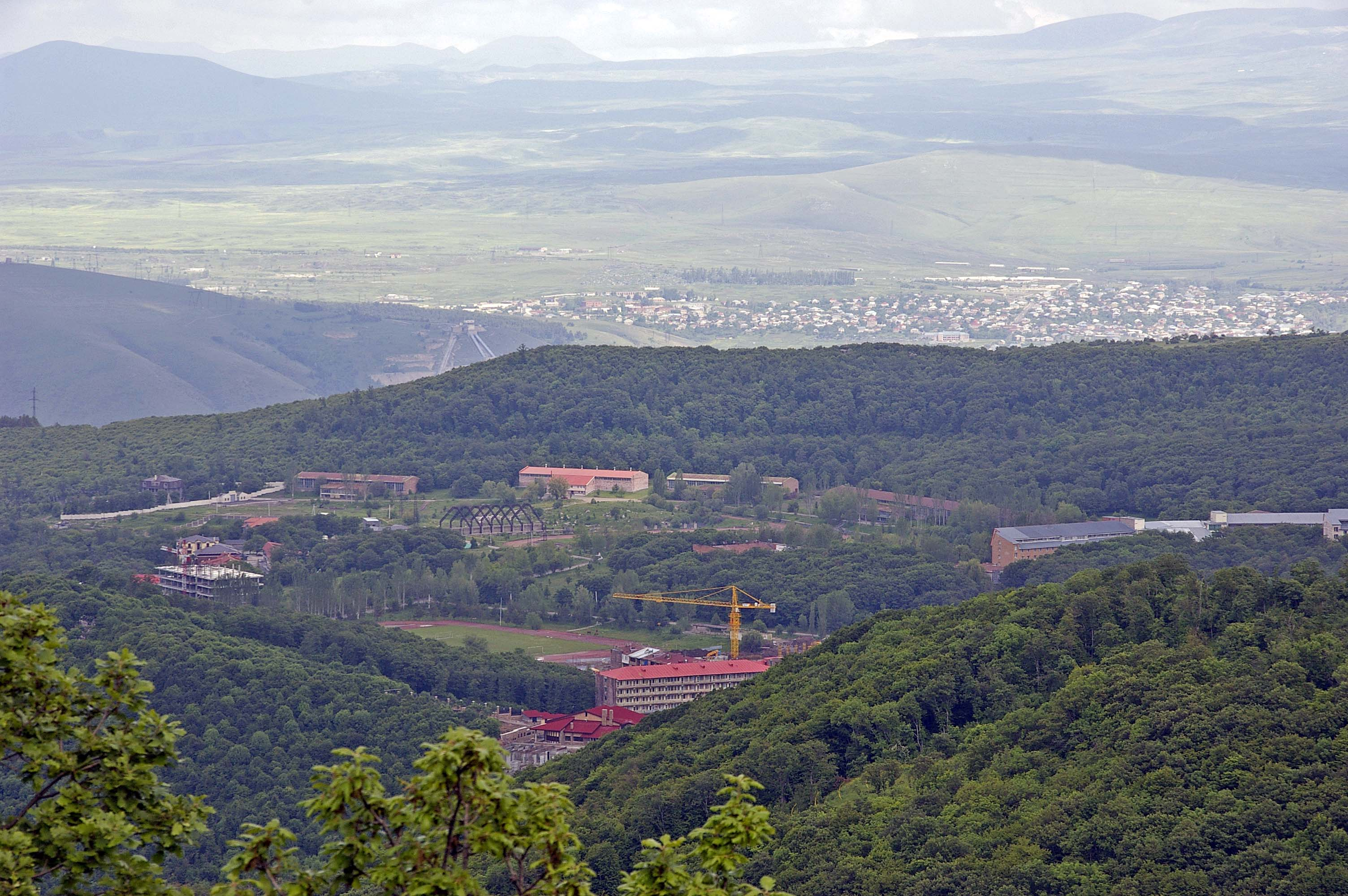
Tsaghkadzor spa town

The monastery of Geghard located at the south of province is a UNESCO World Heritage Site, designated as the Monastery of Geghard and the Upper Azat Valley. The pagan Temple of Garni and the medieval Kecharis Monastery are also among the attractive monuments of the province.

The province has three nature protected areas: the Arzakan-Meghradzor Sanctuary, the Banks' Pine Grove Sanctuary, and the Hankavan Hydrological Sanctuary.

Kotayk has many spa and mountain resorts that attract tourists, including:

- Aghveran mountain resort
- Hankavan mountain resort
- Tsaghkadzor spa town
- Tsaghkadzor ski resort

== Education ==
Hrazdan is home to the Humanitarian University of Hrazdan. Owned by the private sector, the university has three faculties: law, pedagogy and economics.

Two major science institutions and research centres are located in Abovyan: the Republican Hospital of tuberculosis and the Institute of Biological Microbes of the Armenian National Academy of Sciences.

The Armenak Khanperyants Military Aviation University is located near the town of Nor Hachn.

As of the 2015-16 educational year, Kotayk has 103 public schools as well as 1 private school. The number of state pre-school kindergartens is 54.

== Sport ==
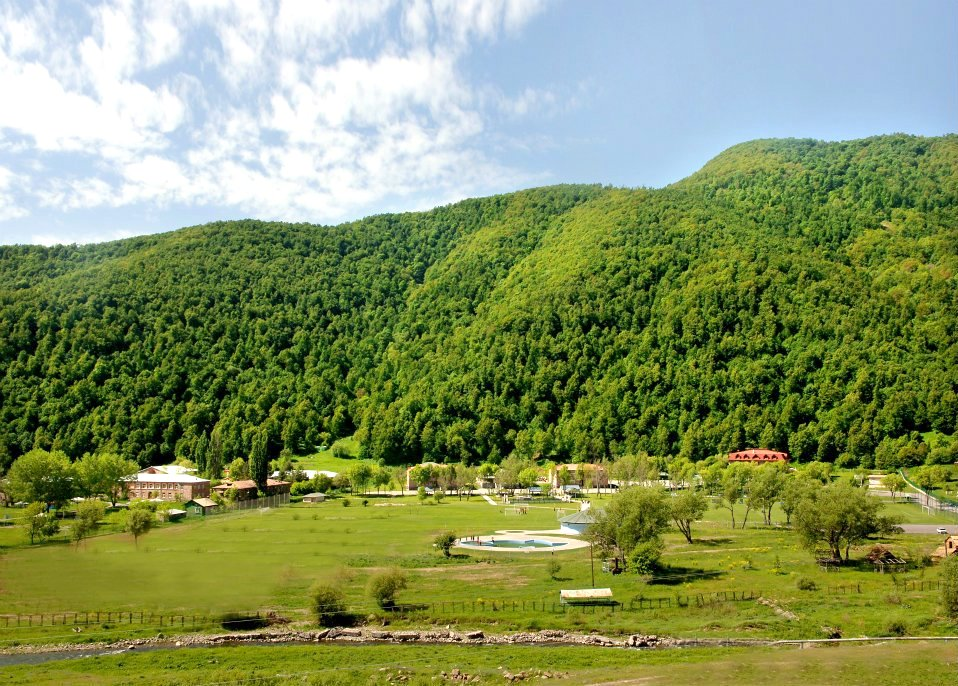
Zepyur Football Training Camp in Pyunik

Football, basketball and other Olympic sports including weightlifting and wrestling are popular in Kotayk.

FC Kotayk founded in 1955, is one of the oldest football clubs in Armenia. Like many other football teams in the country, the club was forced to default from the Armenian football league and consequently from professional football since 2005, due to financial crisis. The short-lived King Delux FC of Abovyan played a single season in the Armenian First League of 2012–13. Other defunct football teams of Kotayk include FC Moush Charentsavan, Hachn FC, FC Shinarar Hrazdan, FC Yeghvard, FC Dinamo Yeghvard and FC Moush Kasagh.

Abovyan City Stadium is the largest sports venue in the province. Stadiums with minor capacities are also found in Hrazdan, Nor Hachn, Charentsavan and Kasagh.

The town of Tsaghkadzor is a major centre for sports in general, mainly winter sports. It has a large sports complex as well as a ski resort.

The Zepyur Football Training Camp is located in the village of Pyunik at the north of Kotayk. The Dzoraghbyur Training Centre owned by FC Ararat Yerevan is also located in Kotayk, in the Dzoraghbyur village.

== Notable natives ==
- Djivan Gasparyan, Armenian musician
- Grigor Magistros (990–1058), Armenian scholar and linguist
- Vanes Martirosyan, Armenian-American professional boxer
- Armen Nazaryan, Armenian judoka
- Leon Orbeli (1882–1958), Armenian physiologist
- Sergey Sarkhoshev (1913–1991), Armenian Assyrian Hero of the Soviet Union
- Masis Voskanyan, Armenian footballer

== Gallery ==
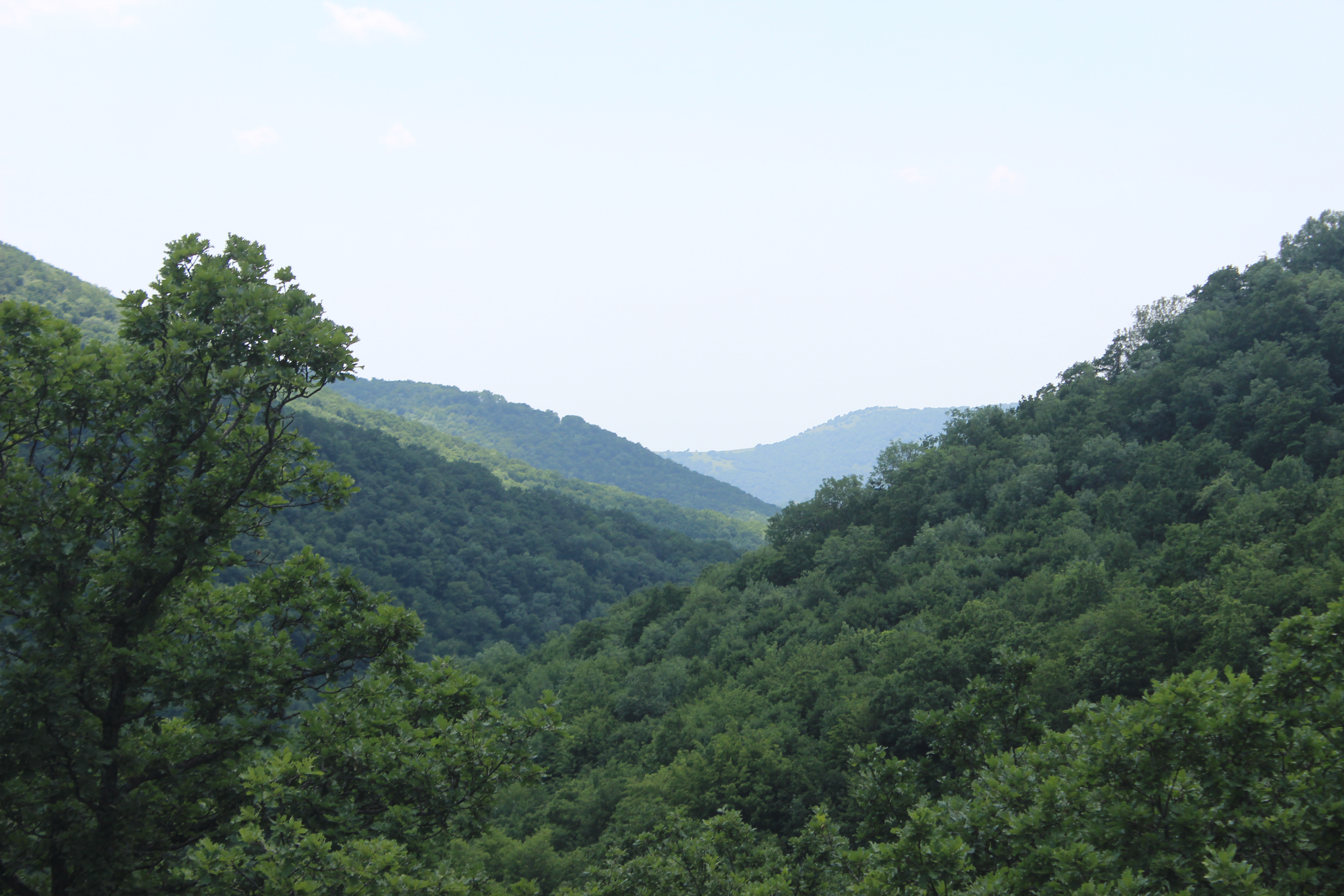
Arzakan-Meghradzor Sanctuary

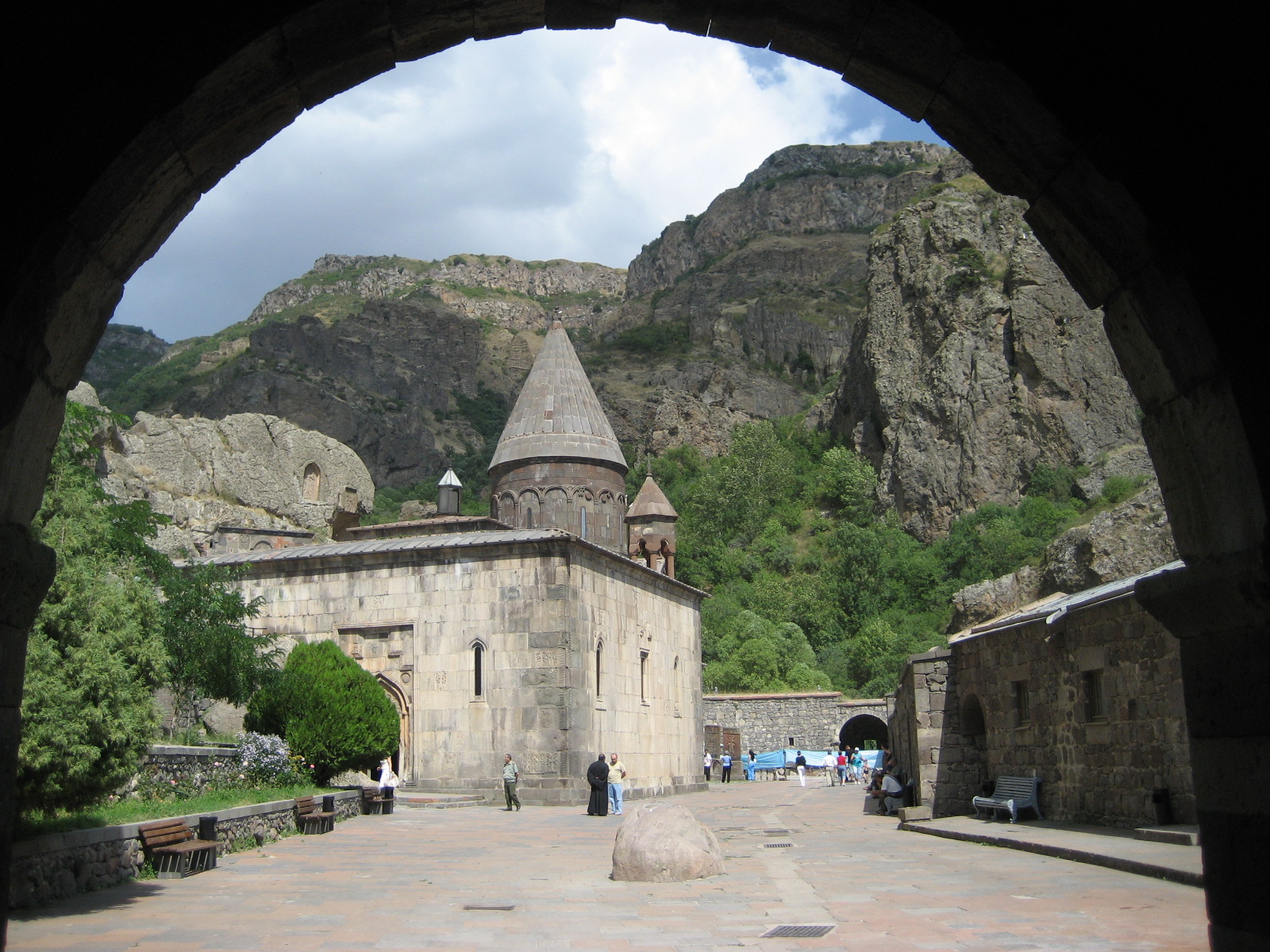
Geghard, 4th century, UNESCO World Heritage Site

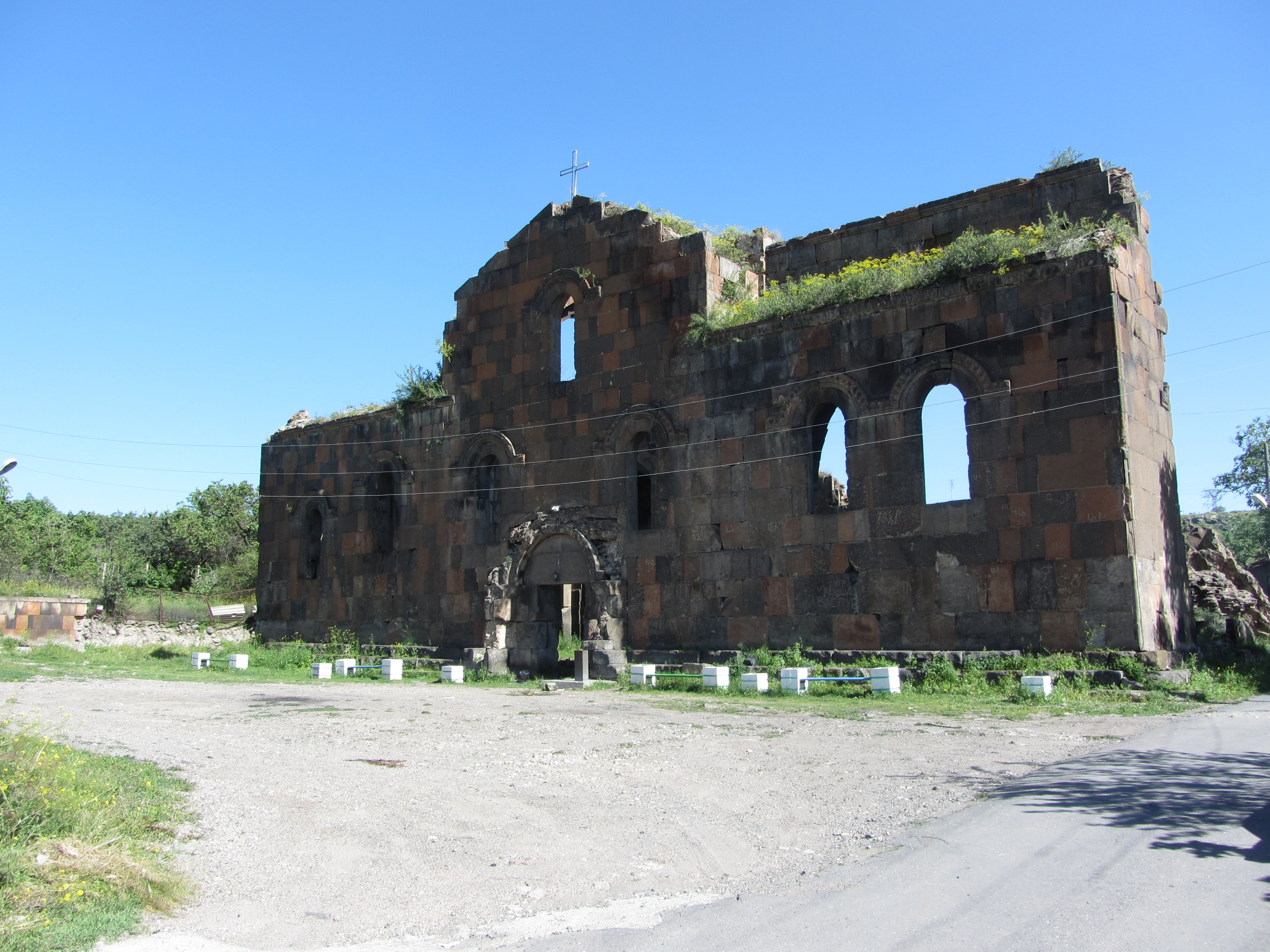
The remains of Ptghnavank monastery, dating back to the 6th and 7th centuries

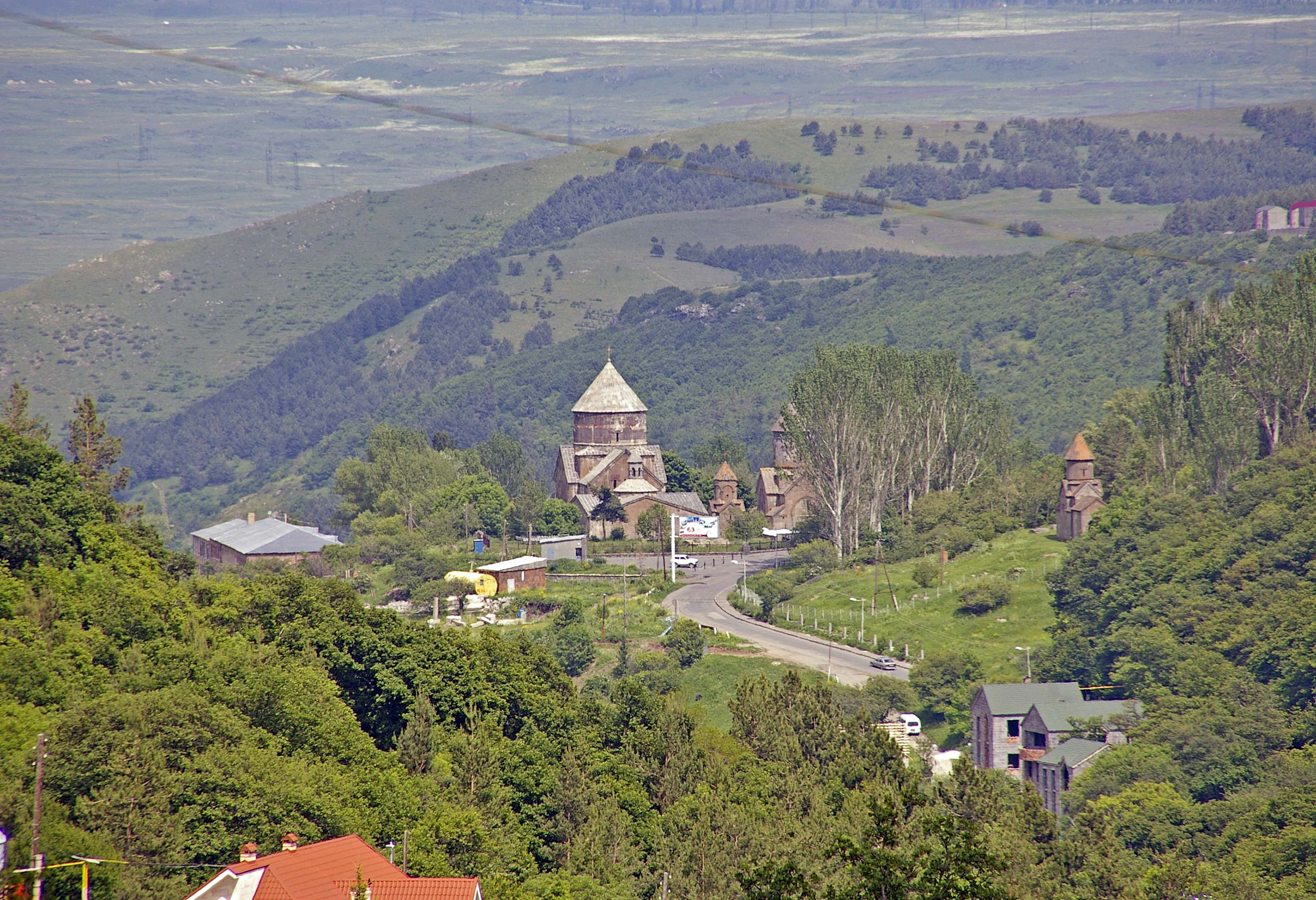
Kecharis Monastery in Tsaghkadzor, 11th century

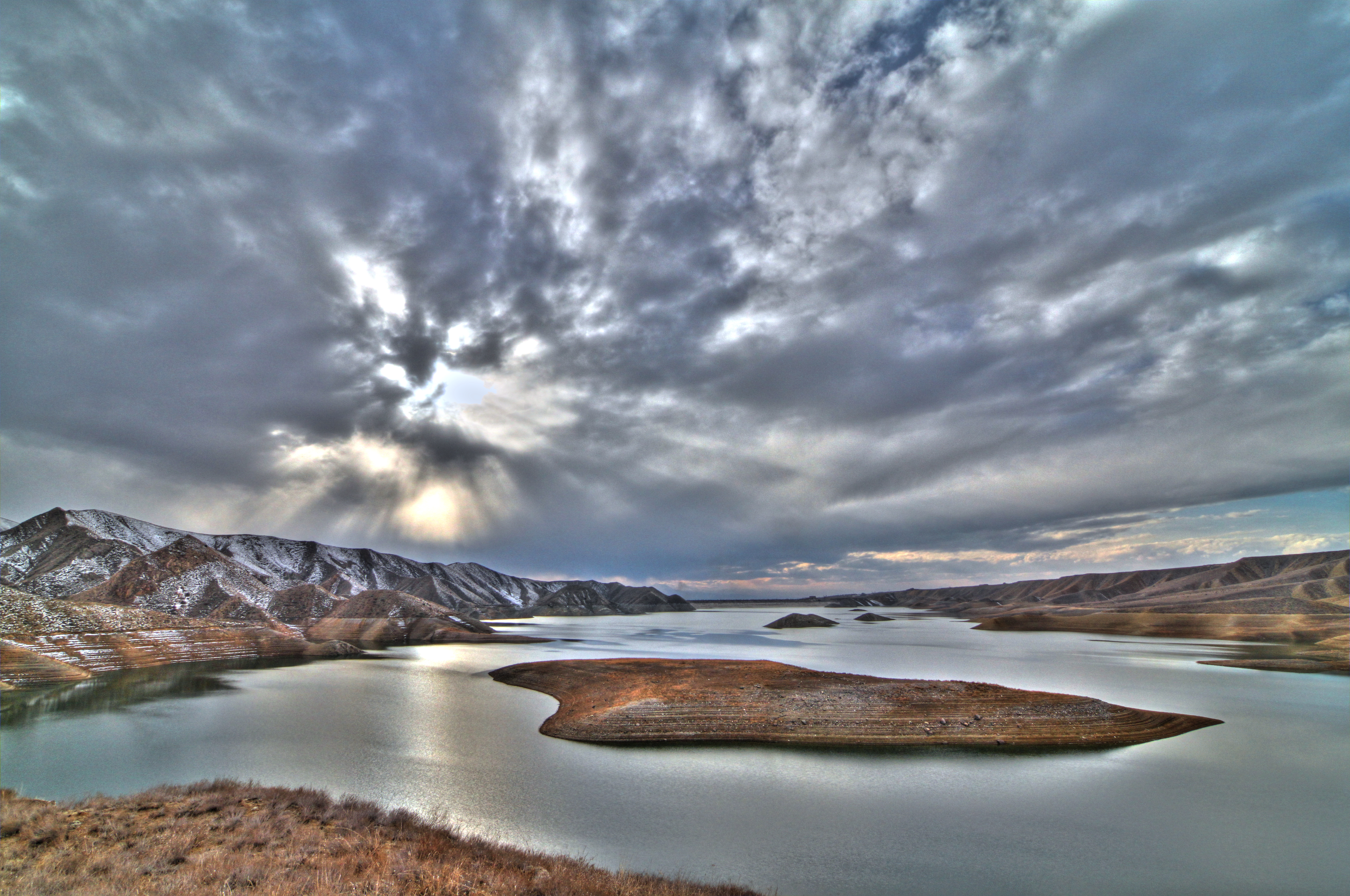
The Azat Reservoir along the Azat River
