= Katnaghbyur, Kotayk =

Village in Kotayk, Armenia

Katnaghbyur Կաթնաղբյուր
- Town
- Location within Armenia
- Coordinates: 40°15′22″N 44°40′36″E
- Country: Armenia
- Marz (Province): Kotayk
- Elevation: 1,450 m (4,760 ft)

Population (2011)
  - Total: 609
- Time zone: UTC+4 ( )
  - Summer (DST): UTC+5 ( )

Katnaghbyur (Armenian: Կաթնաղբյուր, also Romanized as Kat’naghbyur, Katnaghbur, and Katnakhpyur; formerly, Agadzor, Agadarasi) is a village in the Kotayk Province of Armenia.

== See also ==
- Kotayk Province
