= Saralanj, Kotayk =

Saralanj Սարալանջ
- Location within Armenia
- Coordinates: 40°23′59″N 44°31′07″E
- Country: Armenia
- Marz (Province): Kotayk

Government
  - Mayor: Gegham Zilifyan

Area
  - Total: 4.57 km^{2} (1.76 sq mi)
- Elevation: 1,750 m (5,740 ft)

Population (2011)
  - Total: 325
- Time zone: UTC+4 ( )
  - Summer (DST): UTC+5 ( )

Saralanj (Armenian: Սարալանջ, also Romanized as Saralandzh and Saralandj; formerly, Tulnabi) is a village in the Kotayk Province of Armenia. The mayor of Saralanj is Gegham Zilifyan.

== See also ==
- Kotayk Province
