= St. Thaddeus Church, Ddmashen =

Cultural heritage monument of Armenia

Saint Thaddeus the Apostle Church Դդմաշենի Սուրբ Թադևոս եկեղեցի
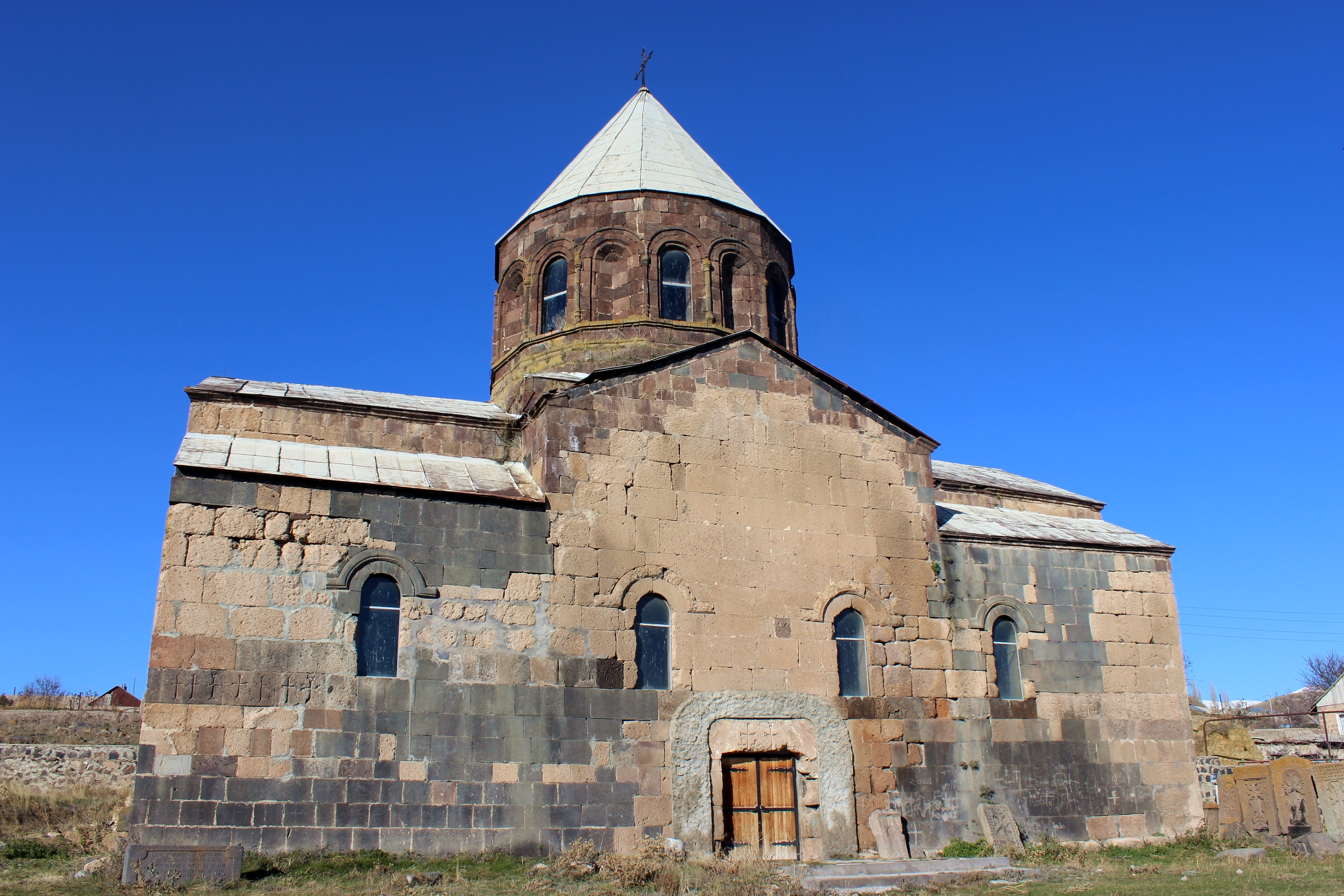
- Ddmashen Saint Thaddeus the Apostle Church

- Location within Armenia Location within Gegharkunik

Religion
- Affiliation: Armenian Apostolic Church
- Status: Active

Location
- Location: Ddmashen, Gegharkunik Province, Armenia
- Coordinates: 40.569683°N 44.820525°E

Architecture
- Style: Armenian
- Completed: 7th century
- Dome: 1

St. Thaddeus the Apostle Church of Ddmashen (Armenian: Դդմաշենի Սուրբ Թադևոս եկեղեցի; also St. Tadevos the Apostle Church) is a 7th-century Armenian church located within the village of Ddmashen in the Gegharkunik Province of Armenia. Named after Saint Thaddeus the Apostle, the church is considered by some to be the fourth most important example of its style of architecture after the Cathedral of Talin, Ptghavank, and Aruchavank. Following structural damage caused by an earthquake, the drum was replaced in 1907 by a sixteen-sided one in an architectural style that was different from that of the original. Aside from the aforementioned alteration, there have not been any other major changes to the church. A large cemetery is situated south of the church, consisting mostly of unmarked grave stones.

== Architecture ==
The church of S. Tadevos has a large cruciform rectangular-plan. A single conical dome rests above a sixteen-sided drum with eight windows that let light into the interior of the structure. There are also niches in the façades between each of the windows that surround the drum. There is a single small window at the apse, while there are ten larger windows light the nave, and a window in each of the prayer rooms or "studies" adjacent to the apse. The exterior and interior of the church are relatively void of any decoration. Molding above the windows is undecorated as well. Within the interior of the church is a painted wooden altar.

== Gallery ==
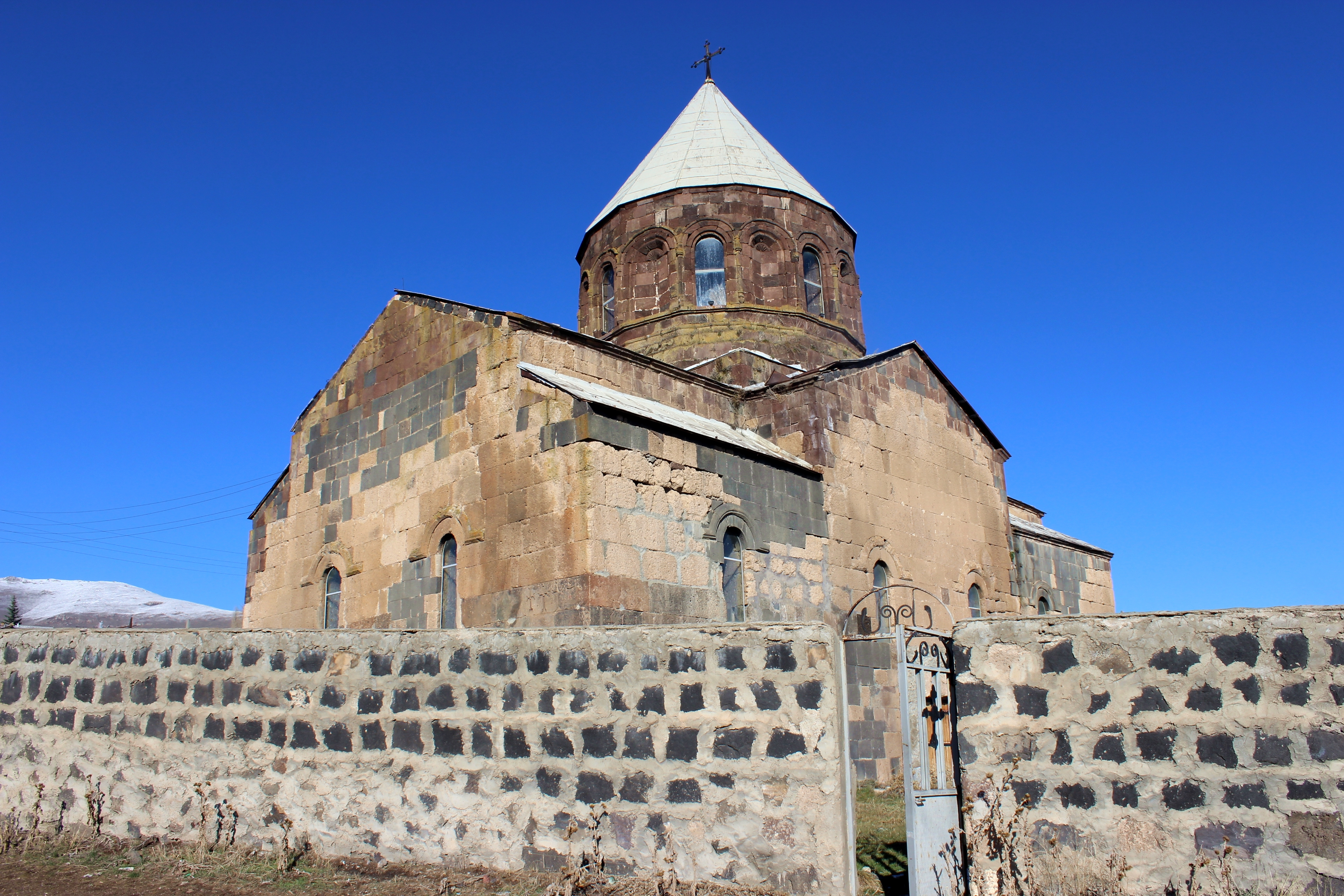
View from the southwest

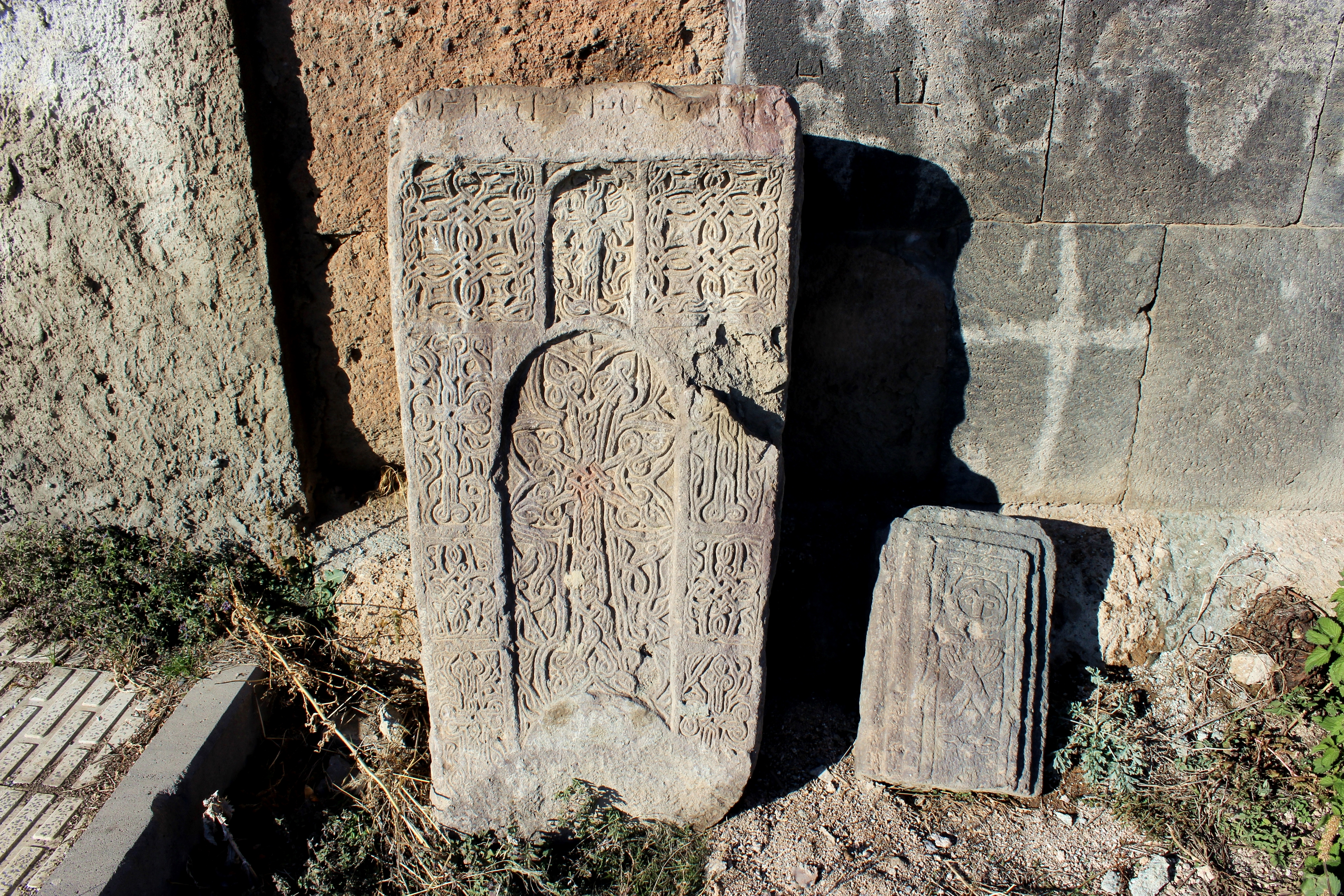
Khachkars near the south entrance

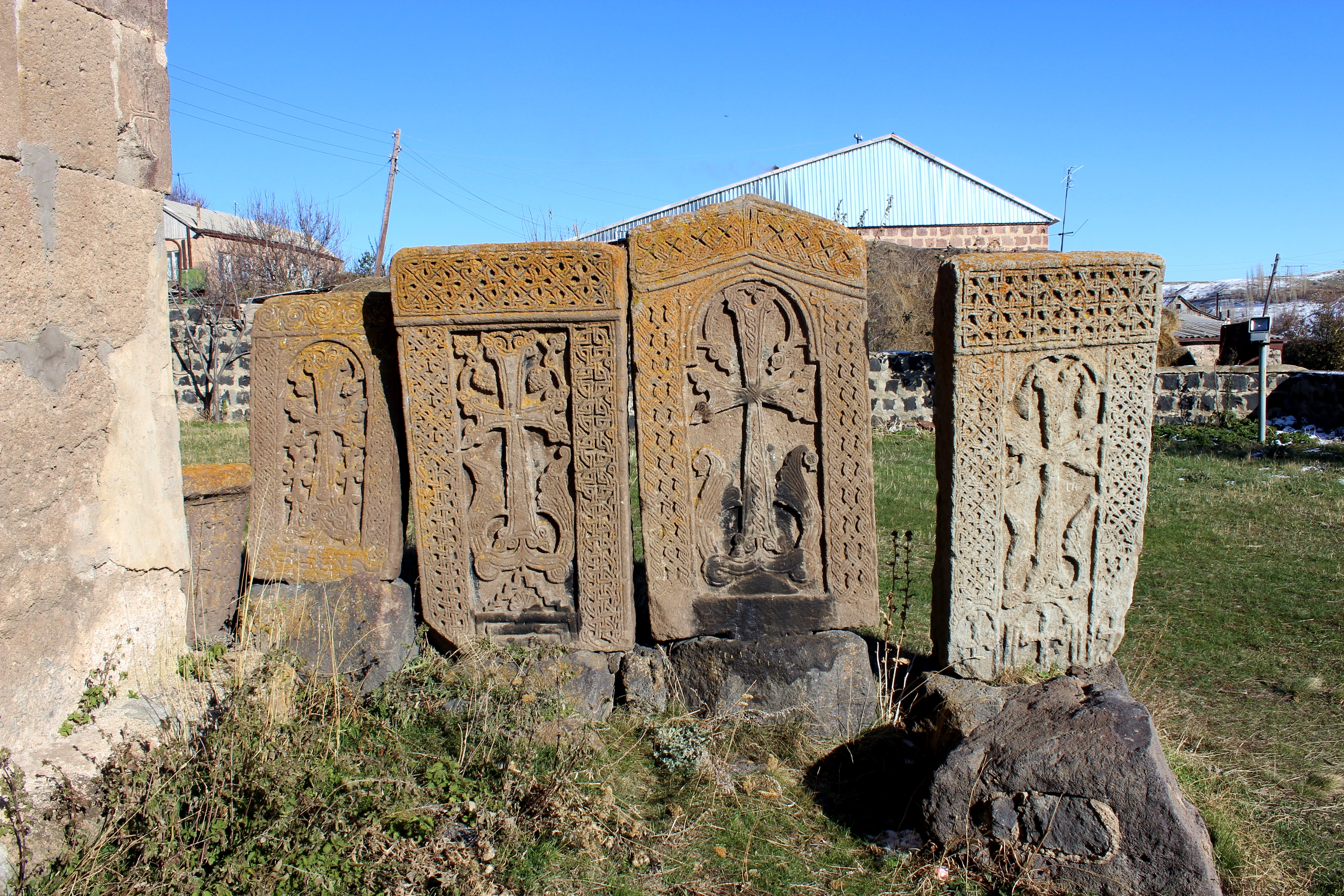
A row of khachkars

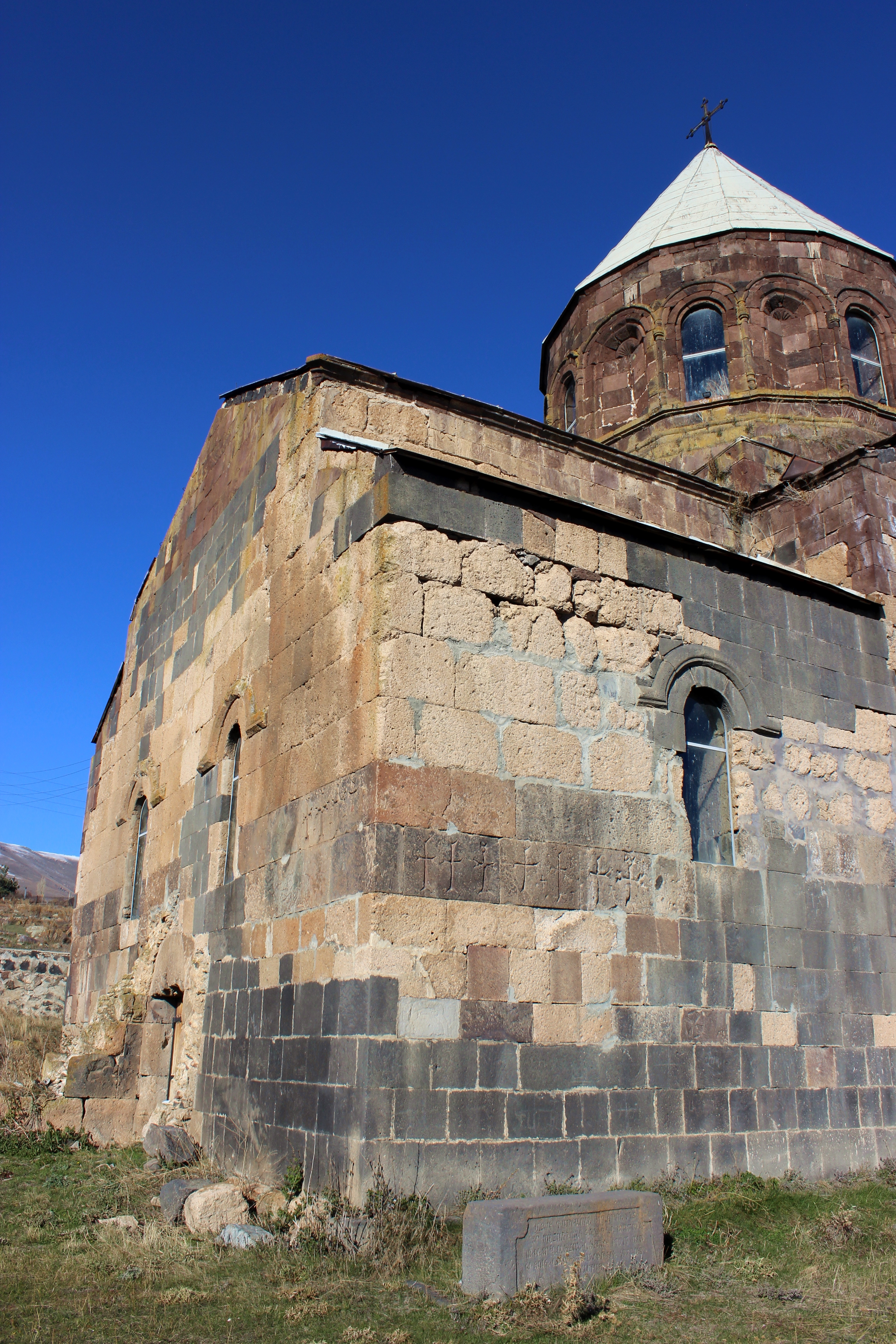
View from the southwest corner

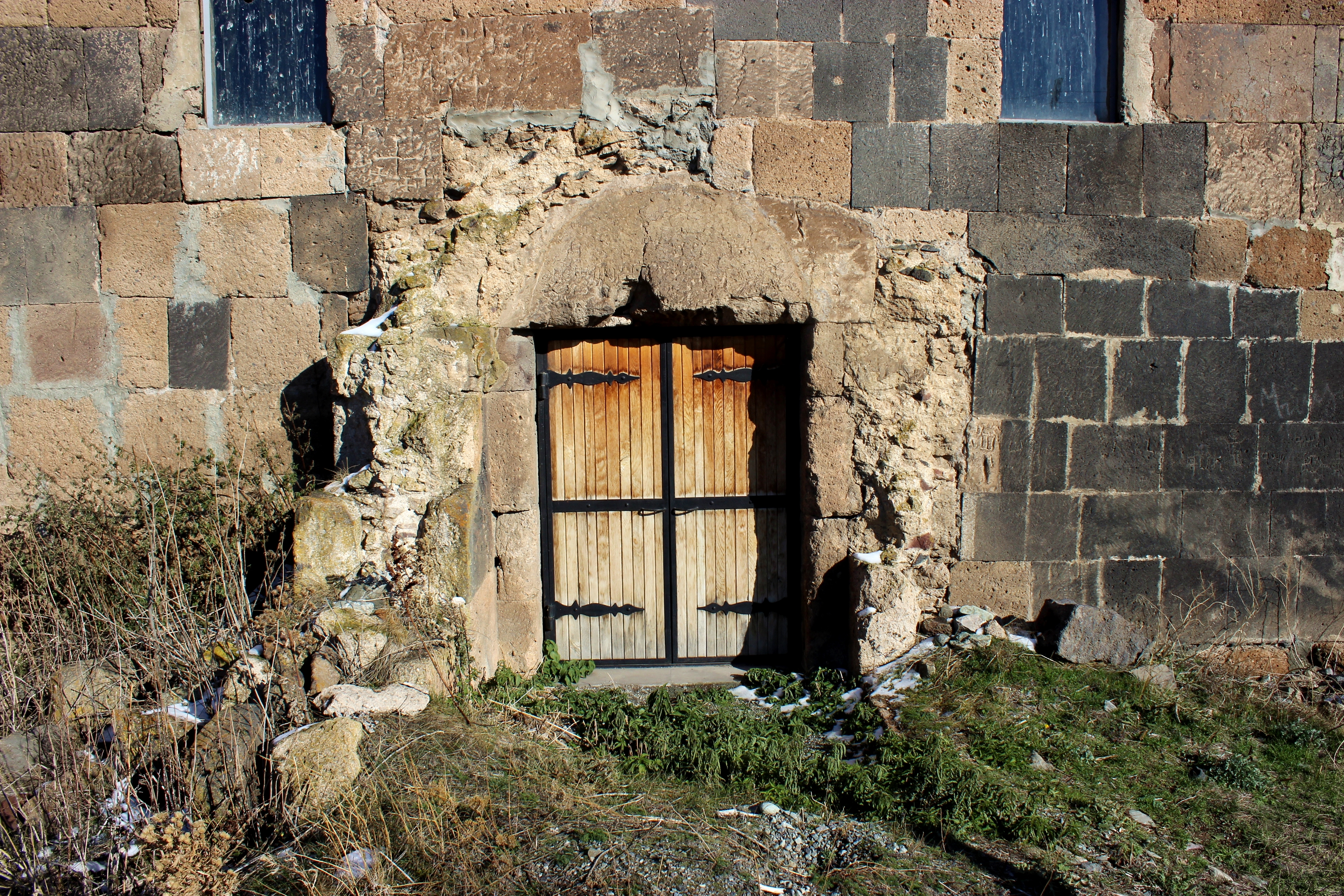
West entry

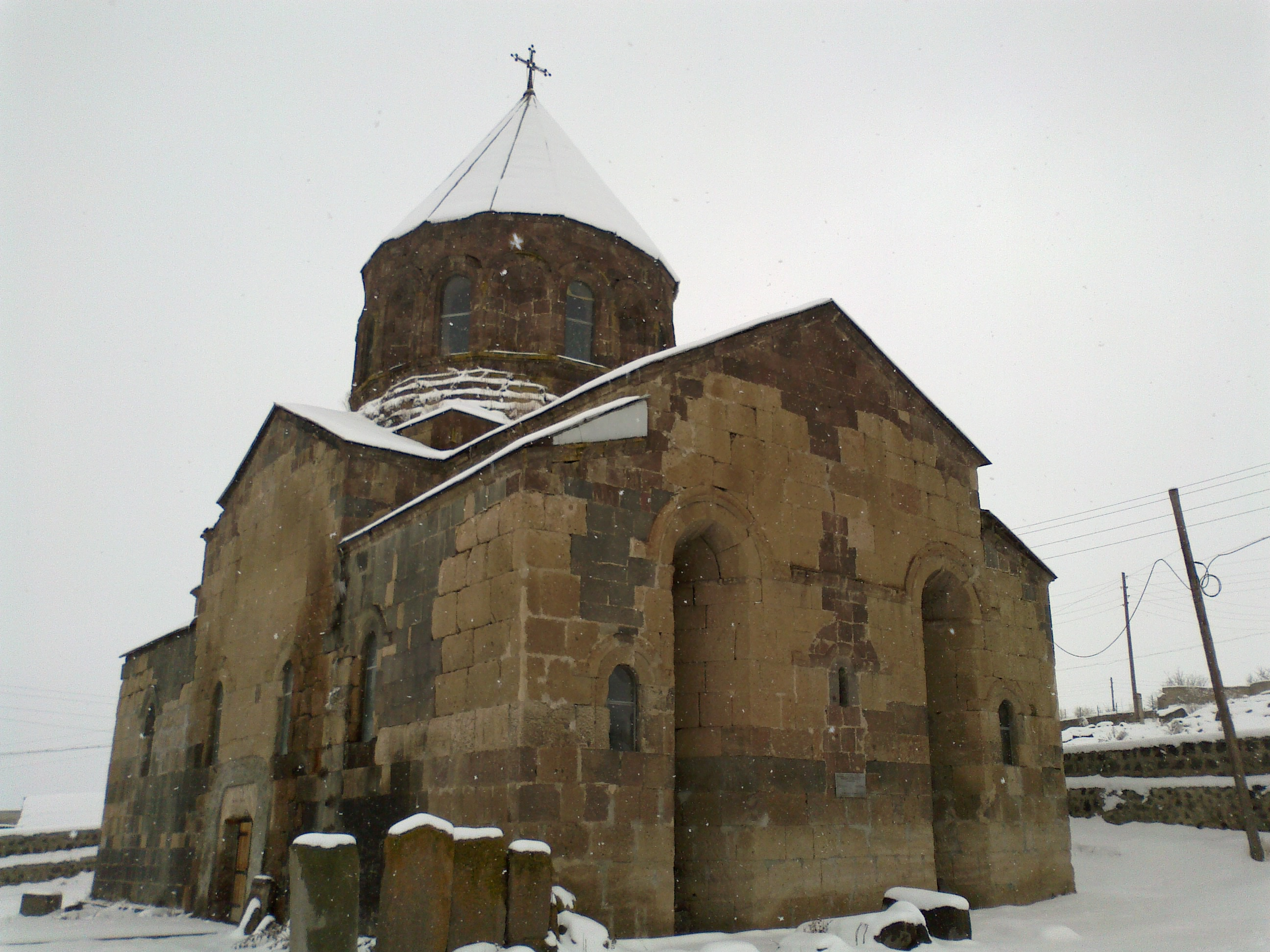

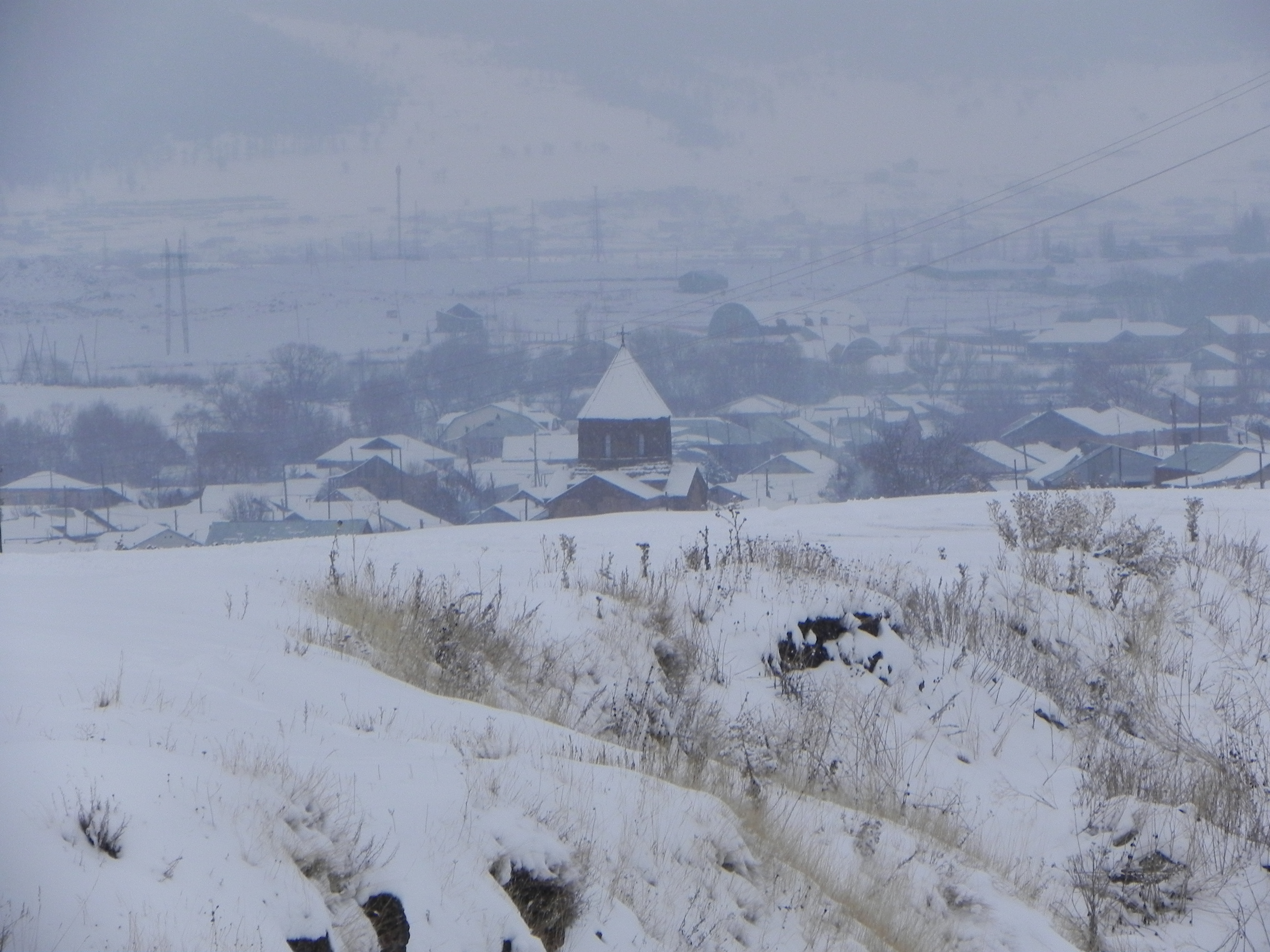
Village view of Ddmashen with the church
