= Ddmashen =

Village in Gegharkunik, Armenia

Ddmashen Դդմաշեն
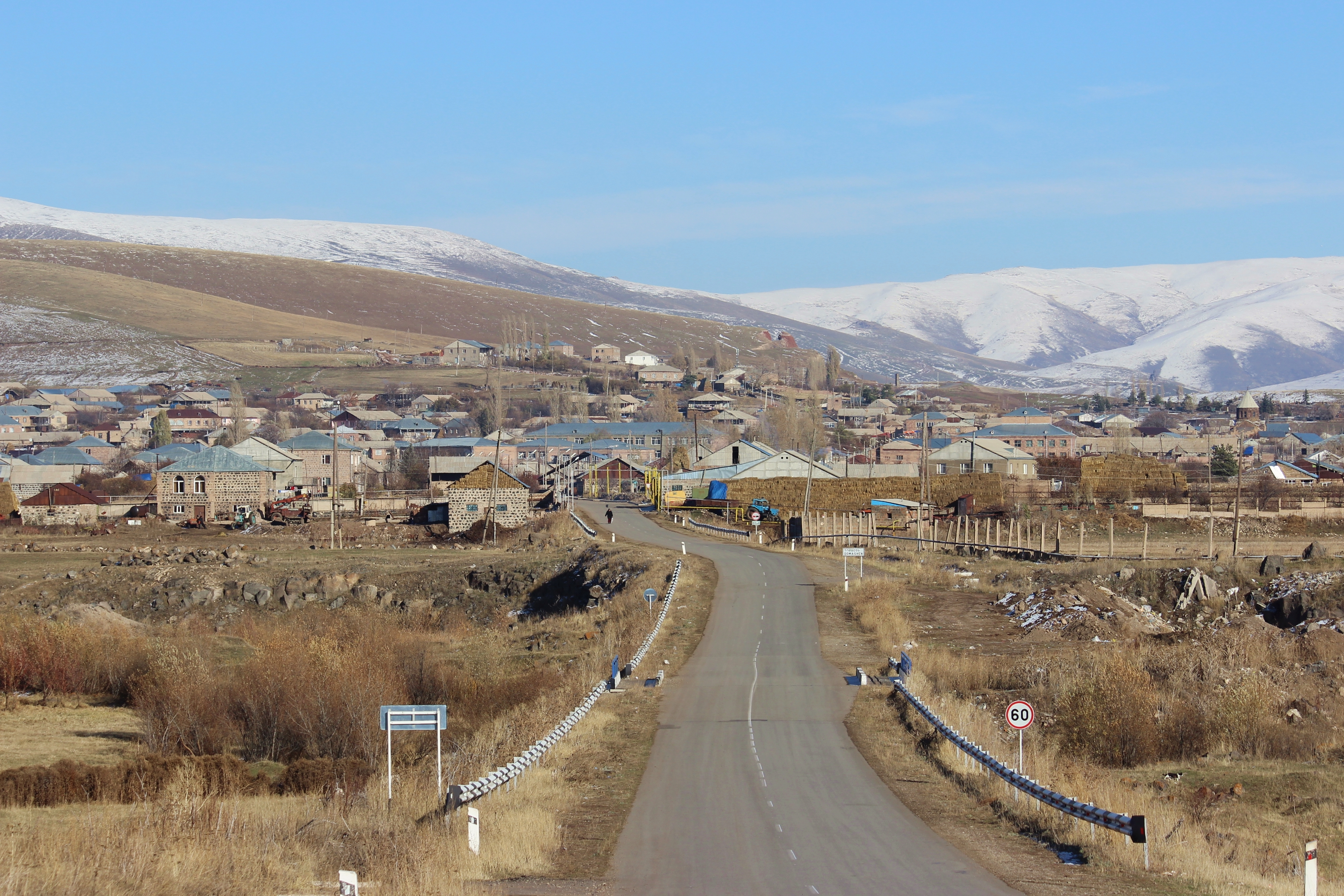
- View of Ddmashen along the road from neighboring Zovaber. The Church of St. Thaddeus the Apostle can be seen to the right.

- Location within Armenia Location within Gegharkunik
- Coordinates: 40°34′14″N 44°49′06″E
- Country: Armenia
- Province: Gegharkunik
- Municipality: Sevan
- Founded: 1828

Area
  - Total: 1.86 km^{2} (0.72 sq mi)
- Elevation: 1,798 m (5,899 ft)

Population (2011)
  - Total: 2,806
  - Density: 1,510/km^{2} (3,910/sq mi)
- Time zone: UTC+4 (AMT)
- Postal code: 1508

Ddmashen (Armenian: Դդմաշեն) is a village in the Sevan Municipality of the Gegharkunik Province of Armenia.

== Etymology ==
The village is also known as Totmashen and Dodmashen.

== History ==
The village was founded in 1828 by emigrants from Maku. The 7th-century St. Thaddeus the Apostle Church is located in the eastern part of the village.

== Gallery ==
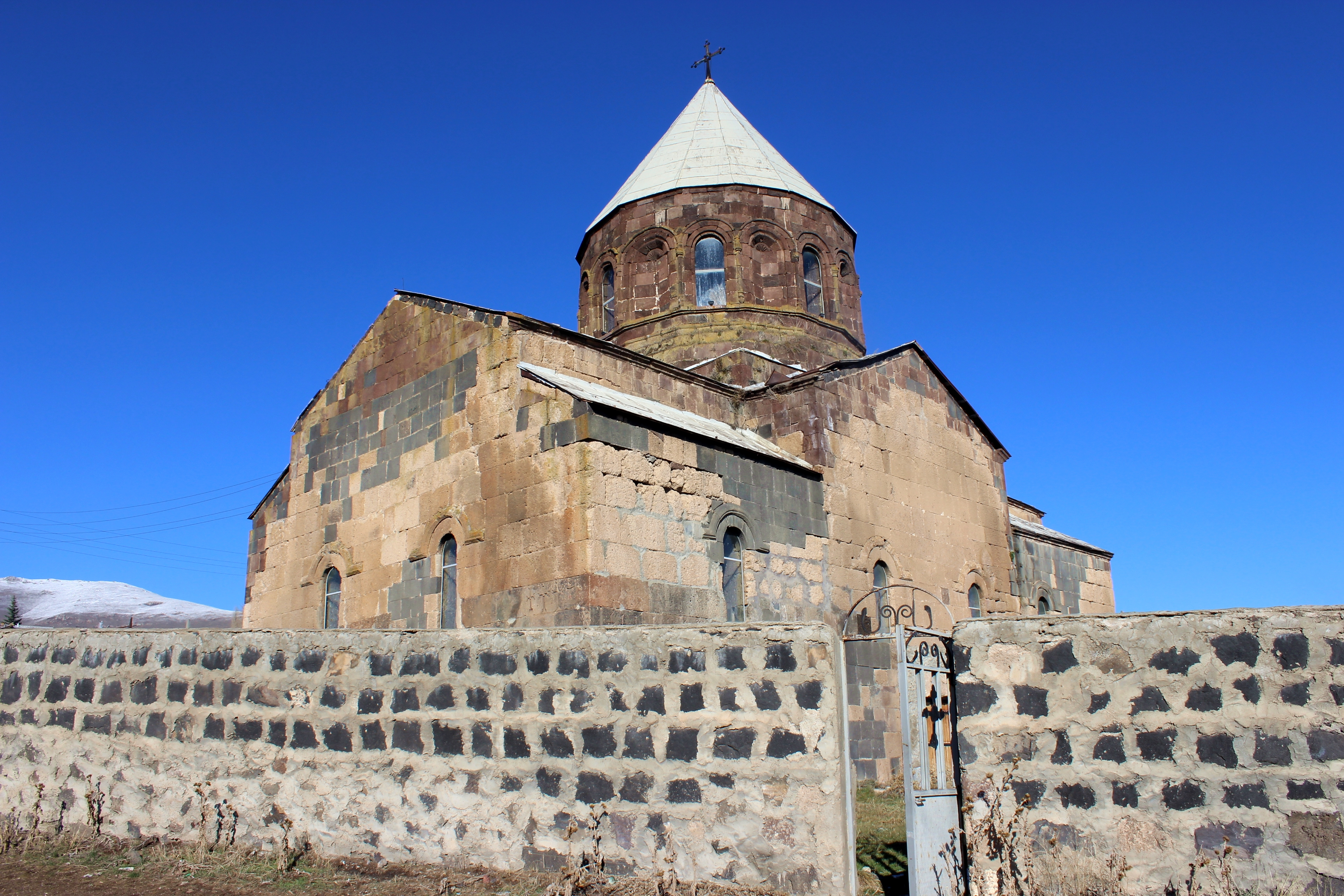
St. Thaddeus the Apostle Church in Ddmashen

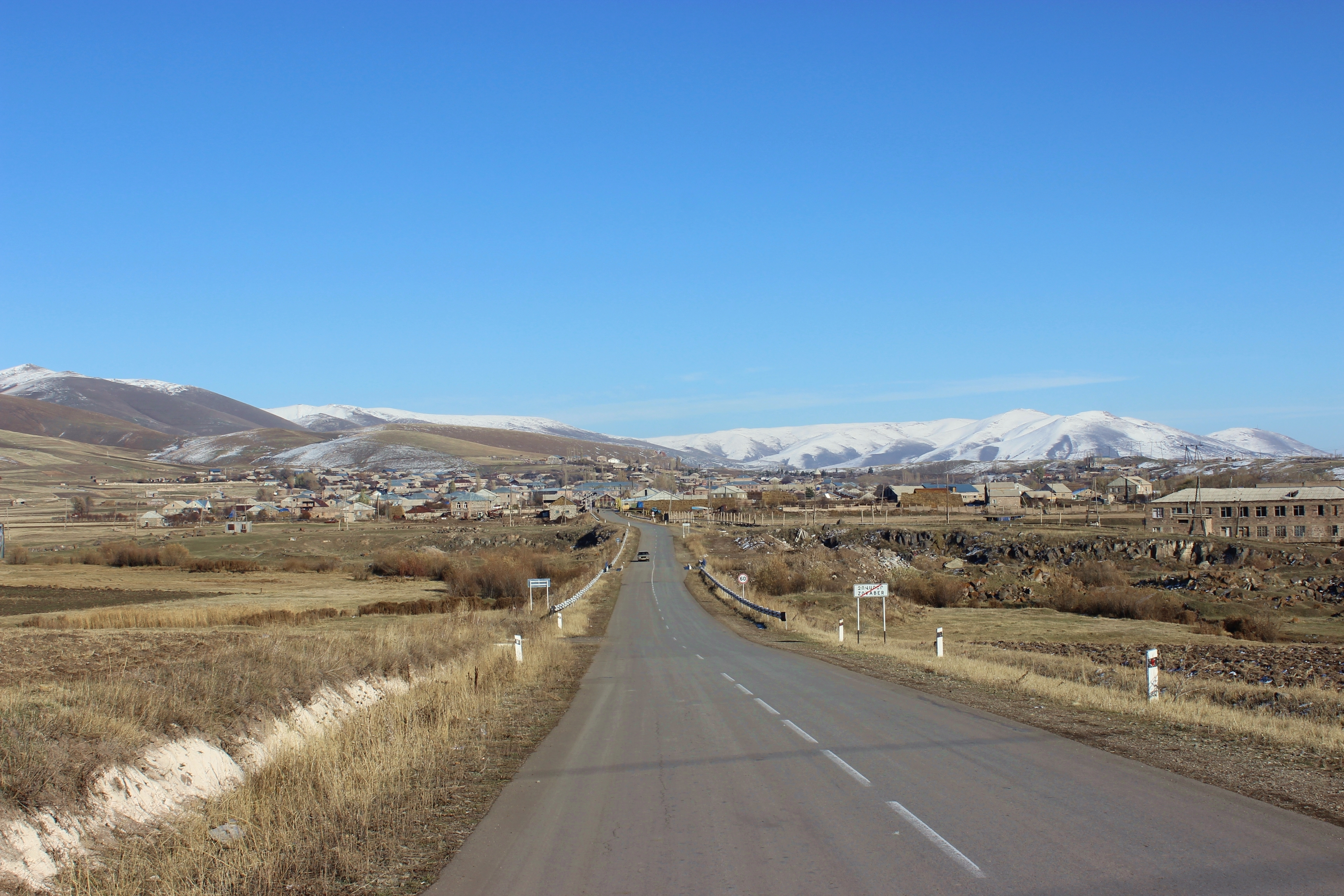
View of Ddmashen along the road from neighboring Zovaber

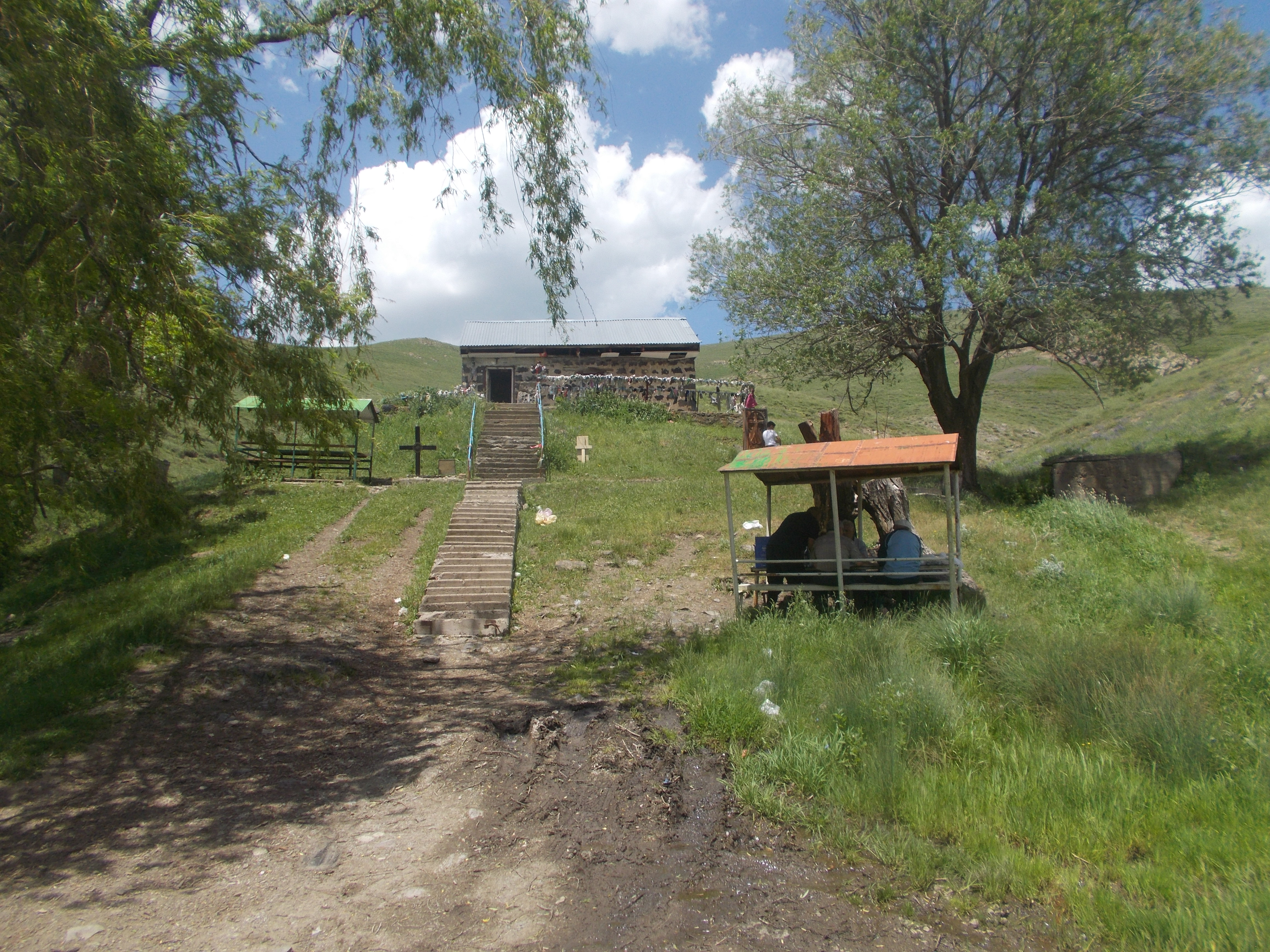
Tsarav Dzor Chapel in Ddmashen

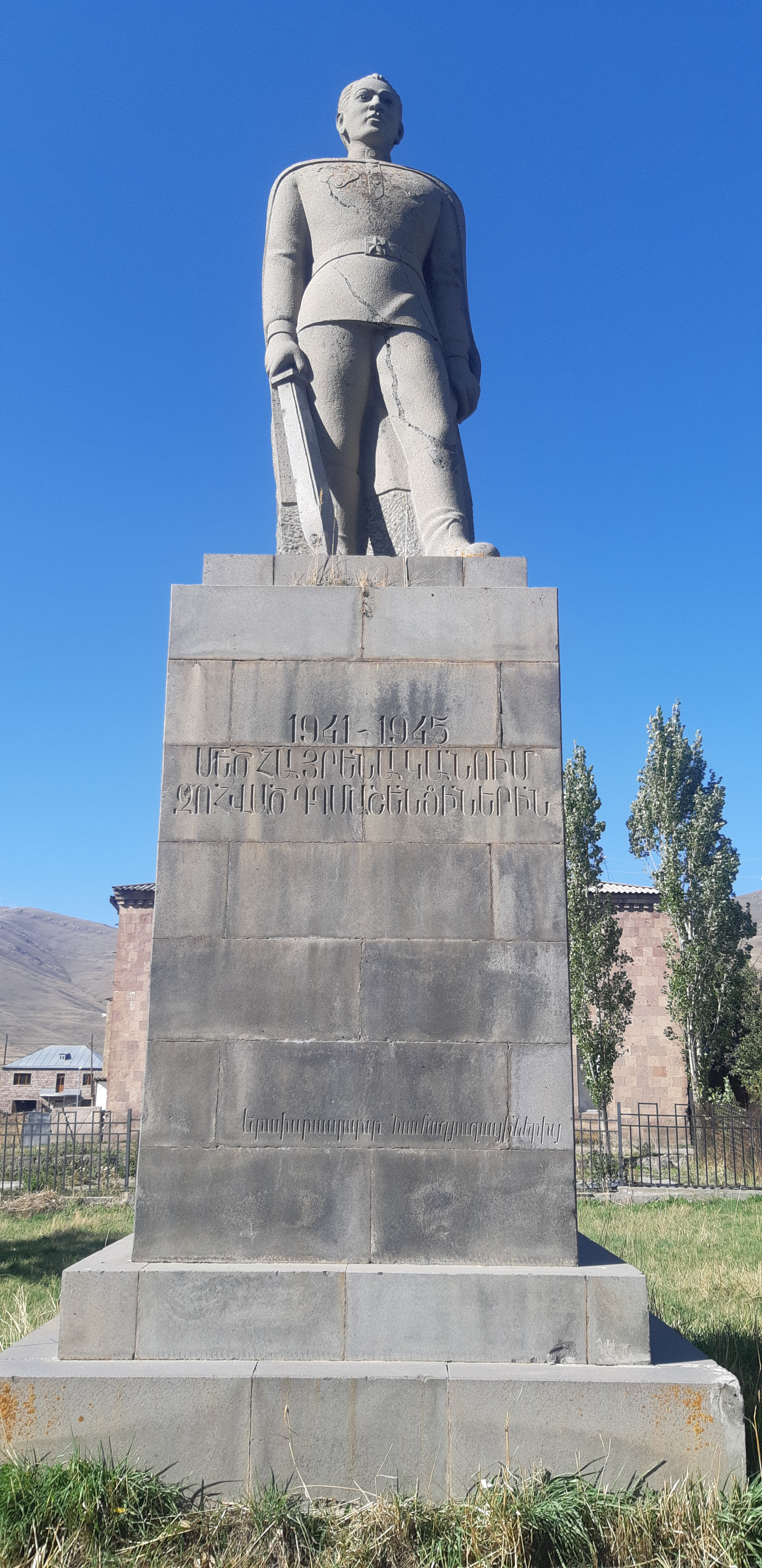
World War II monument

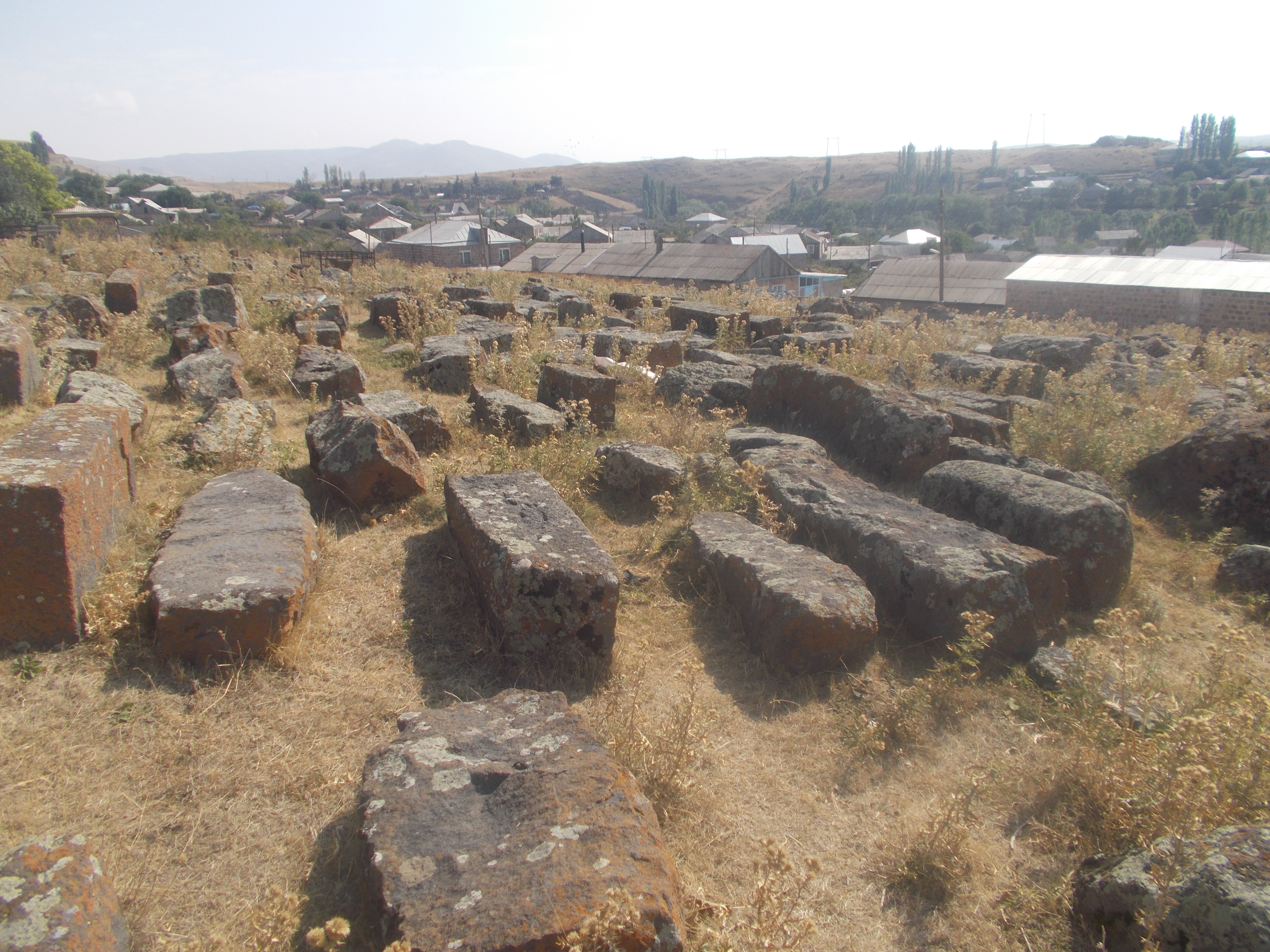
Cemetery in Ddmashen
