= Ptghni =

Ptghni Պտղնի Պտղնի
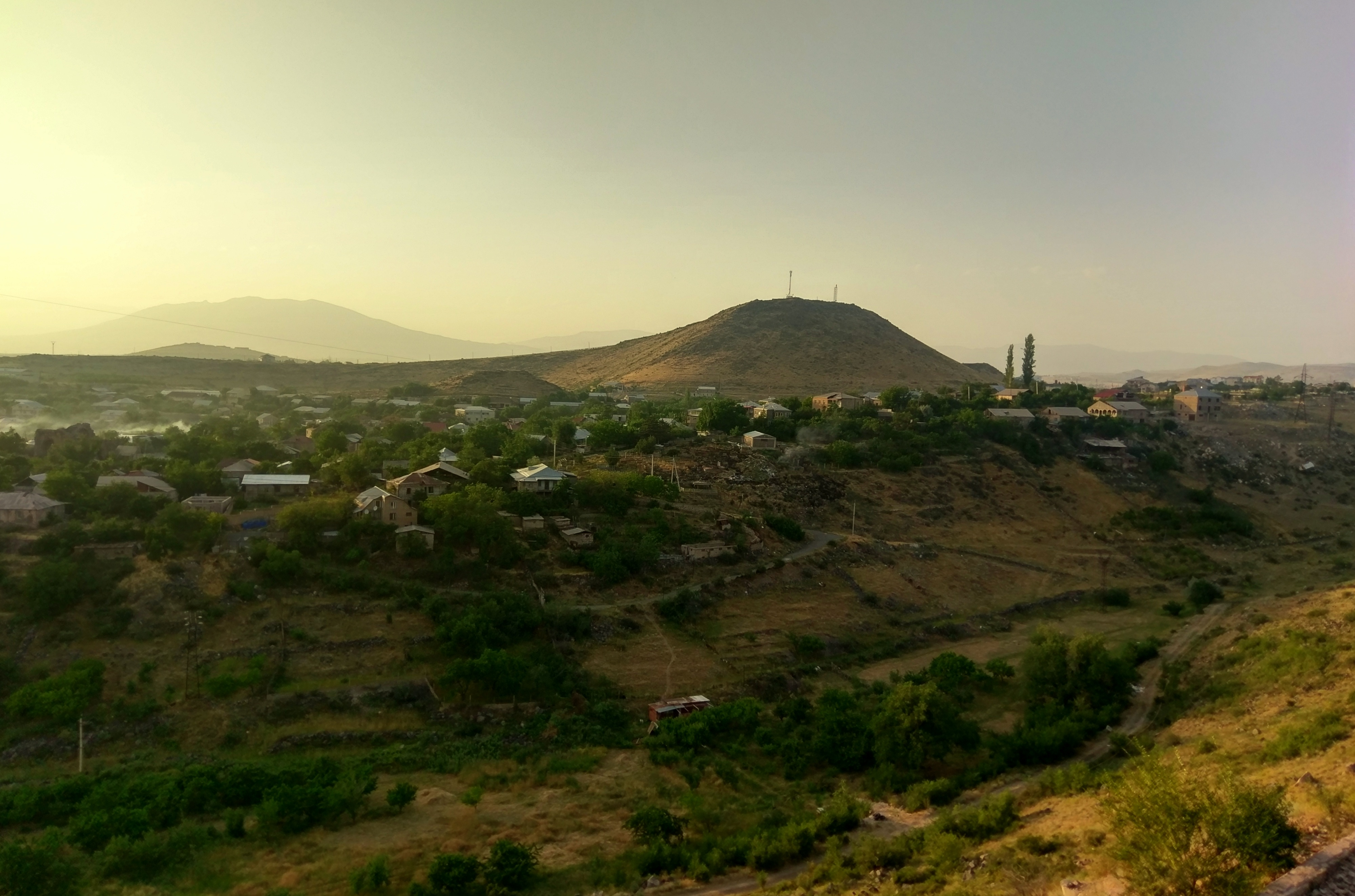
- Ptghni

- Location within Armenia
- Coordinates: 40°15′24″N 44°35′06″E
- Country: Armenia
- Marz (Province): Kotayk
- Founded: 1831

Government
  - Mayor: Arakel Virabyan

Area
  - Total: 6.22 km^{2} (2.40 sq mi)
- Elevation: 1,350 m (4,430 ft)

Population (2011)
  - Total: 1,595
  - Density: 256/km^{2} (664/sq mi)
- Time zone
  - Summer (DST): UTC+5

Ptghni (Armenian: Պտղնի), is a village located in the Kotayk Province of Armenia along the left bank of the Hrazdan River. Ptghni's mayor Arakel Virabyan was the only mayor of the village for more than 30 years. Ptghni was founded in 1831. The village has a school, kindergarten, house of culture, and a library. The local economy is dependent on agriculture and local inhabitants primarily grow grapes, melons, gourds, and breed cattle. Within the village are the remains of fortress walls and Ptghavank of the 6th to 7th-century.

== Gallery ==
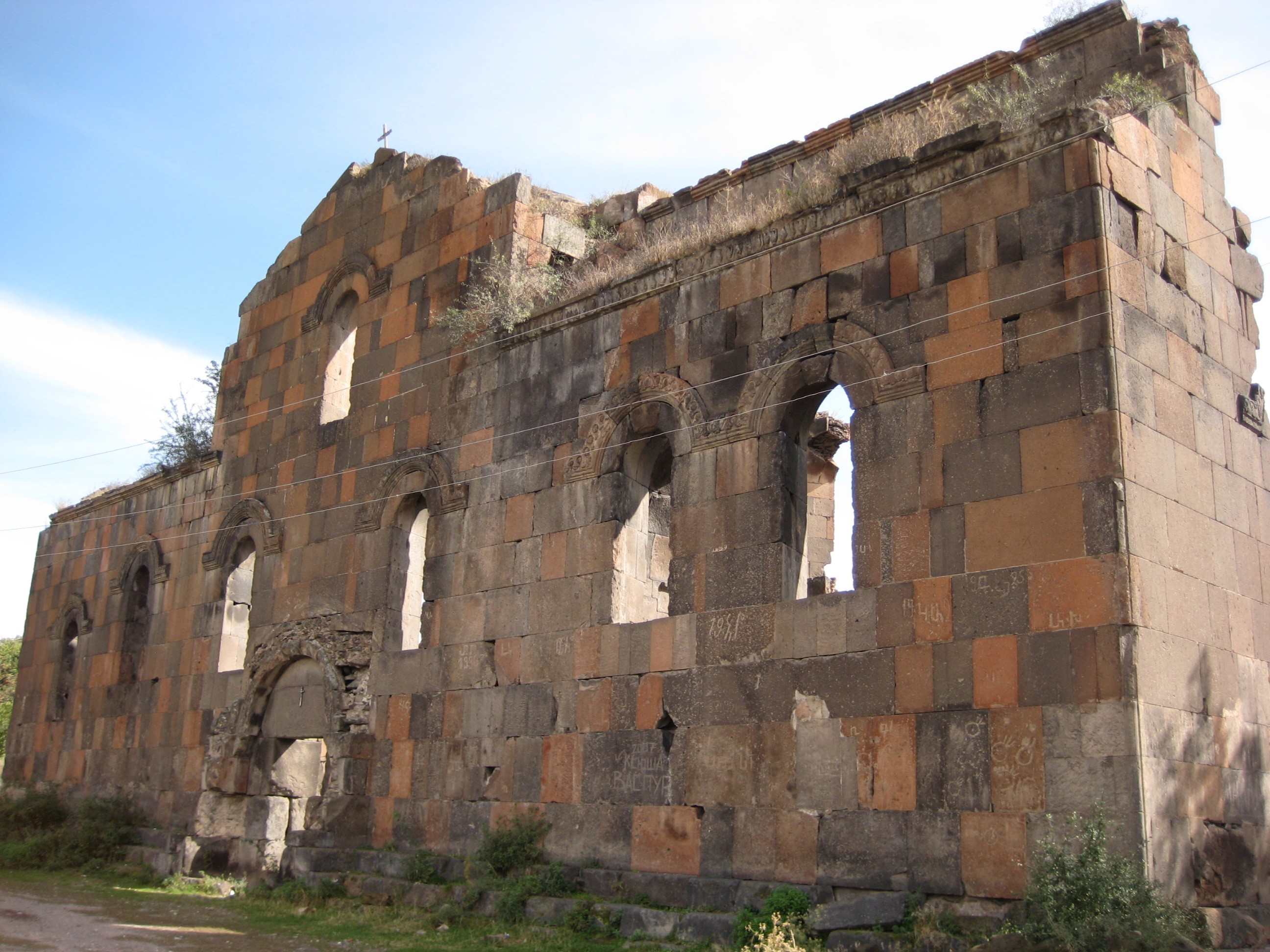
Ptghnavank, 6th-7th c.

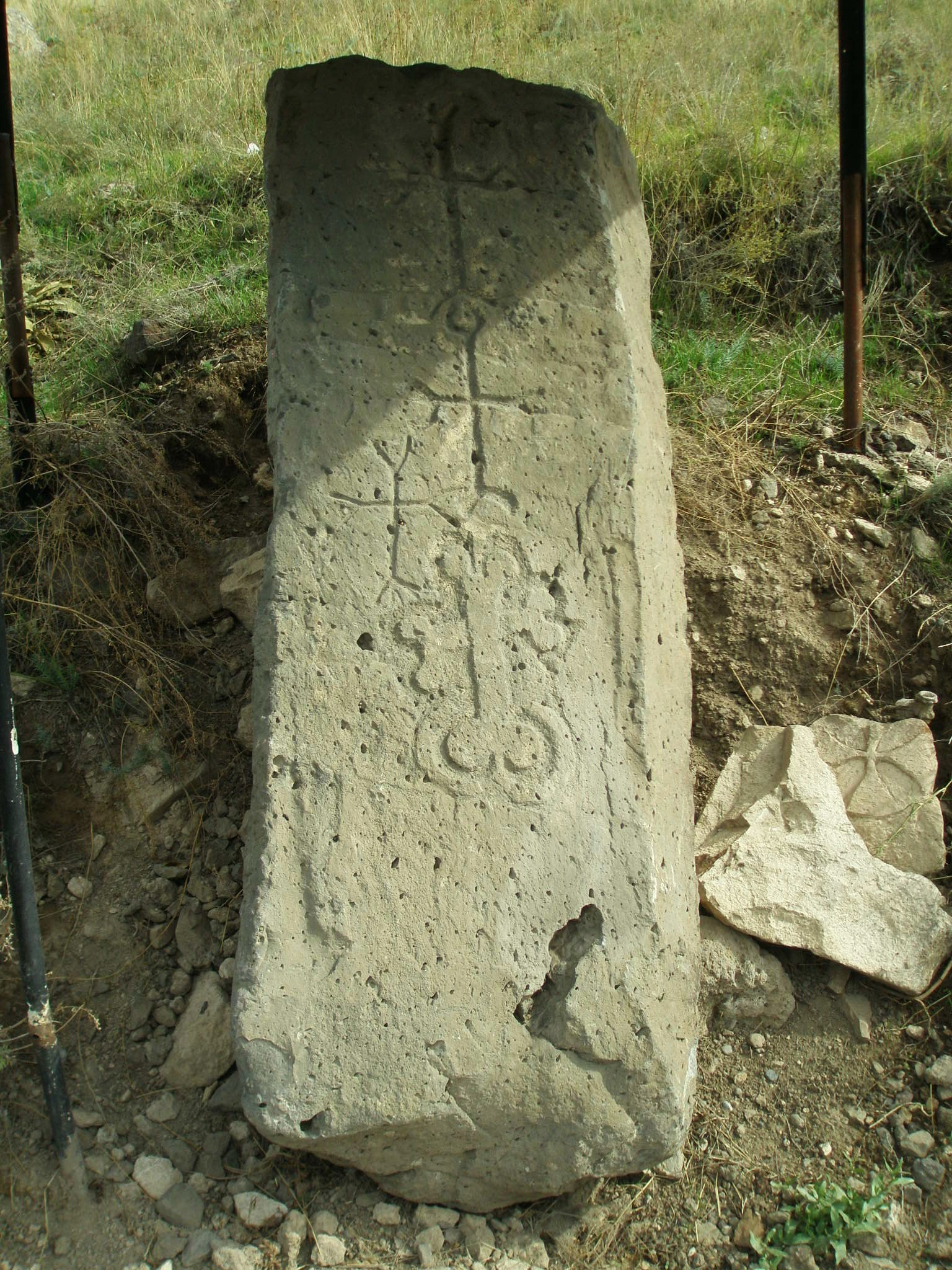
Khachkar monument beside the road leading to the village.

== See also ==
- Kotayk Province
