= Ptghnavank =

Cultural heritage monument of Armenia

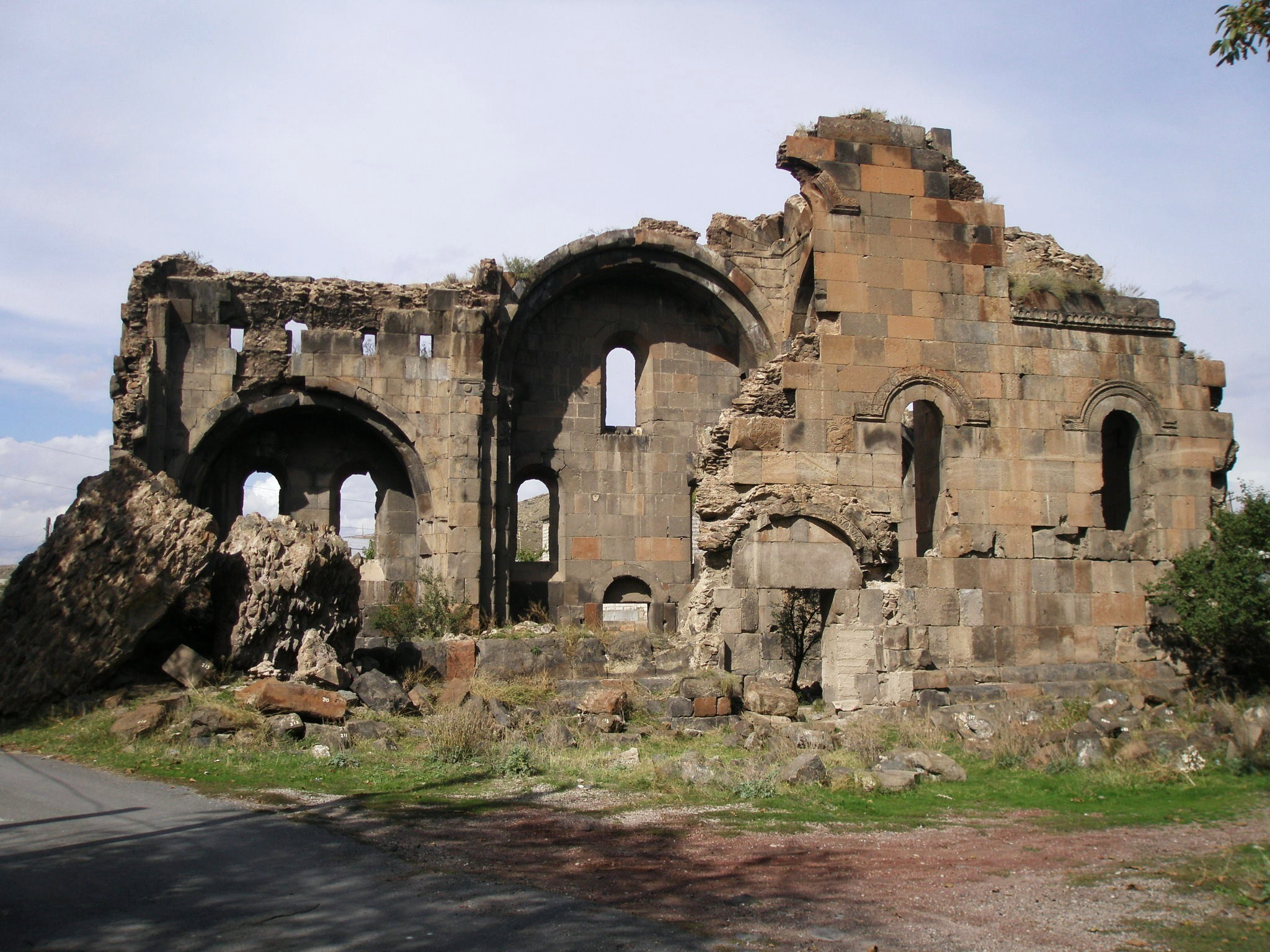

- Location within Armenia

Religion
- Affiliation: Armenian Apostolic Church

Location
- Location: Ptghni, Kotayk Province, Armenia
- Coordinates: 40.2567°N 44.5850°E

Architecture
- Type: Domed single-nave church
- Style: Armenian
- Completed: 6th or 7th century
- Dome: 1 (collapsed)

Ptghnavank (Armenian: Պտղնավանք) or Ptghni church (Պտղնիի տաճար) is located in the village of Ptghni in the Kotayk Province of Armenia.

== Architecture ==
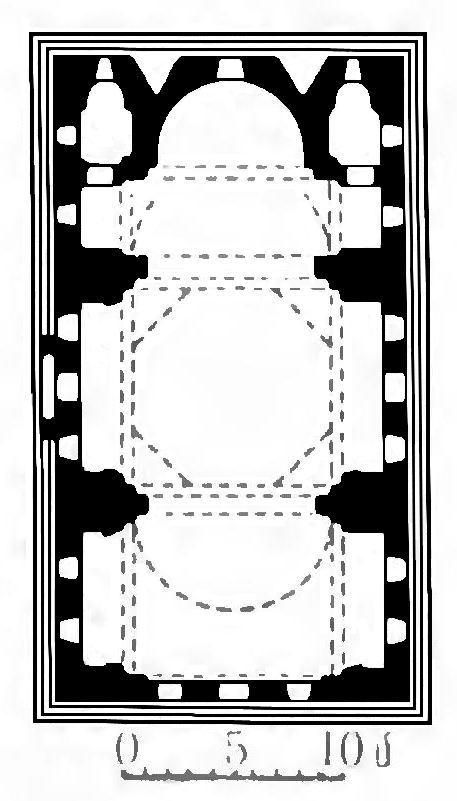
Plan of Ptghnavank.

The temple is a domed single-nave basilica type completed in the 6th or 7th century. Presently, the only surviving parts of the temple are most of the north wall, part of the south wall with one of the four impost arches of the dome, and some traces of the vaulting. The cupola and ceiling vaults, drum, and dome have since collapsed.

The church is noteworthy for its relief sculpture. Around the window casings, vegetal and geometric patterns may be found. Some restoration work had been done to the church in 1940.

== Gallery ==
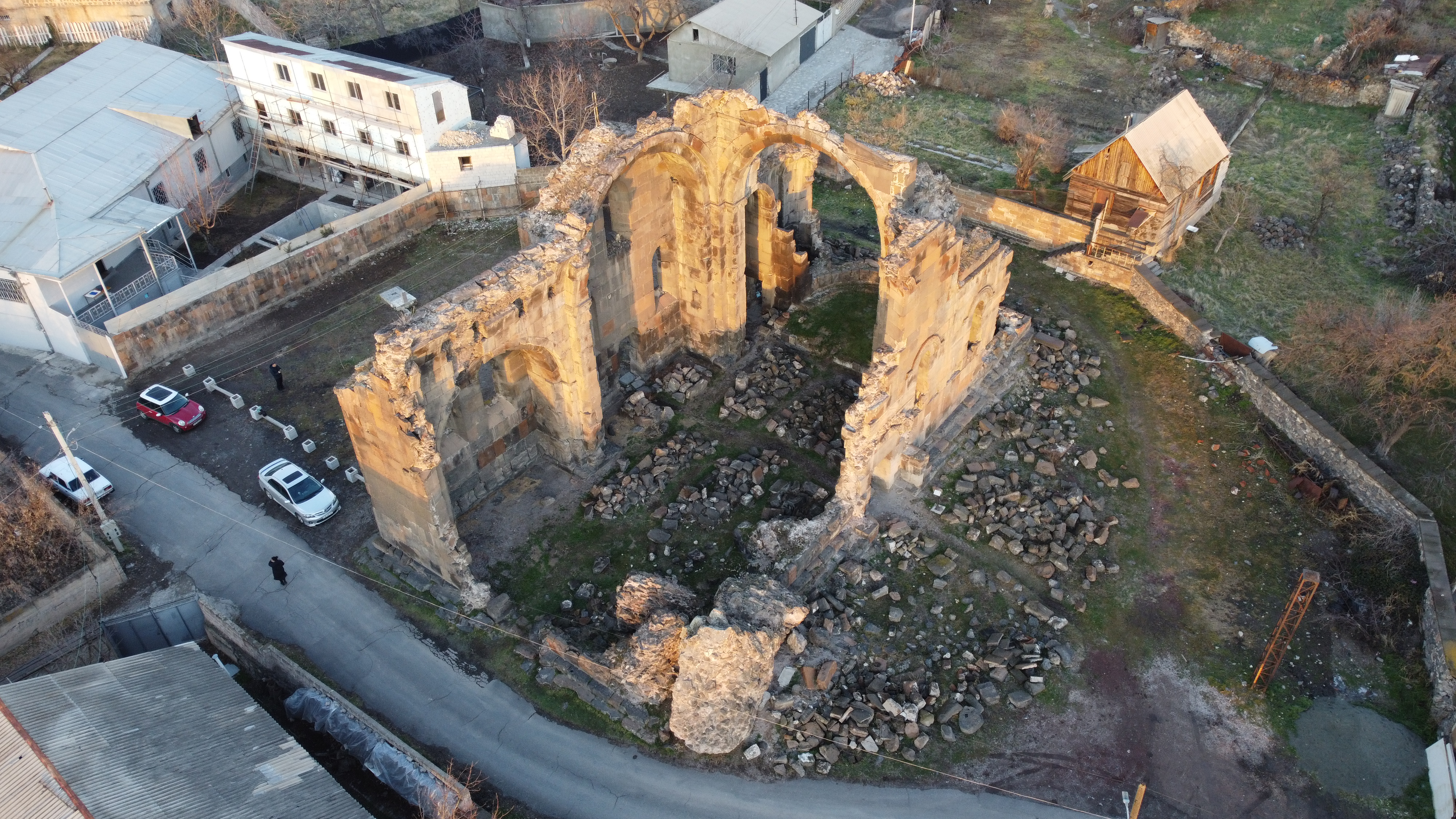
An aerial view

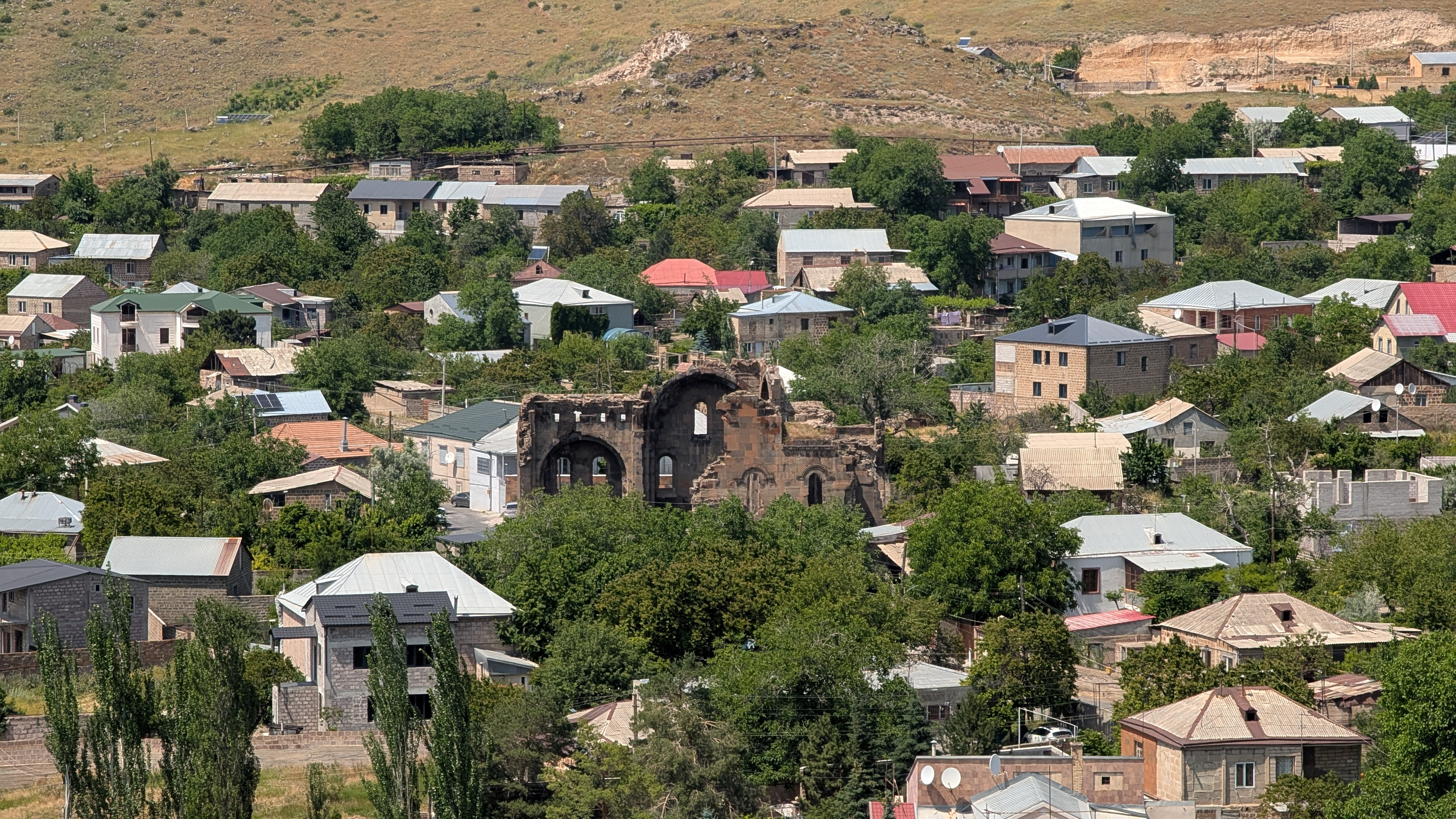
The church's ruins and its surrounding

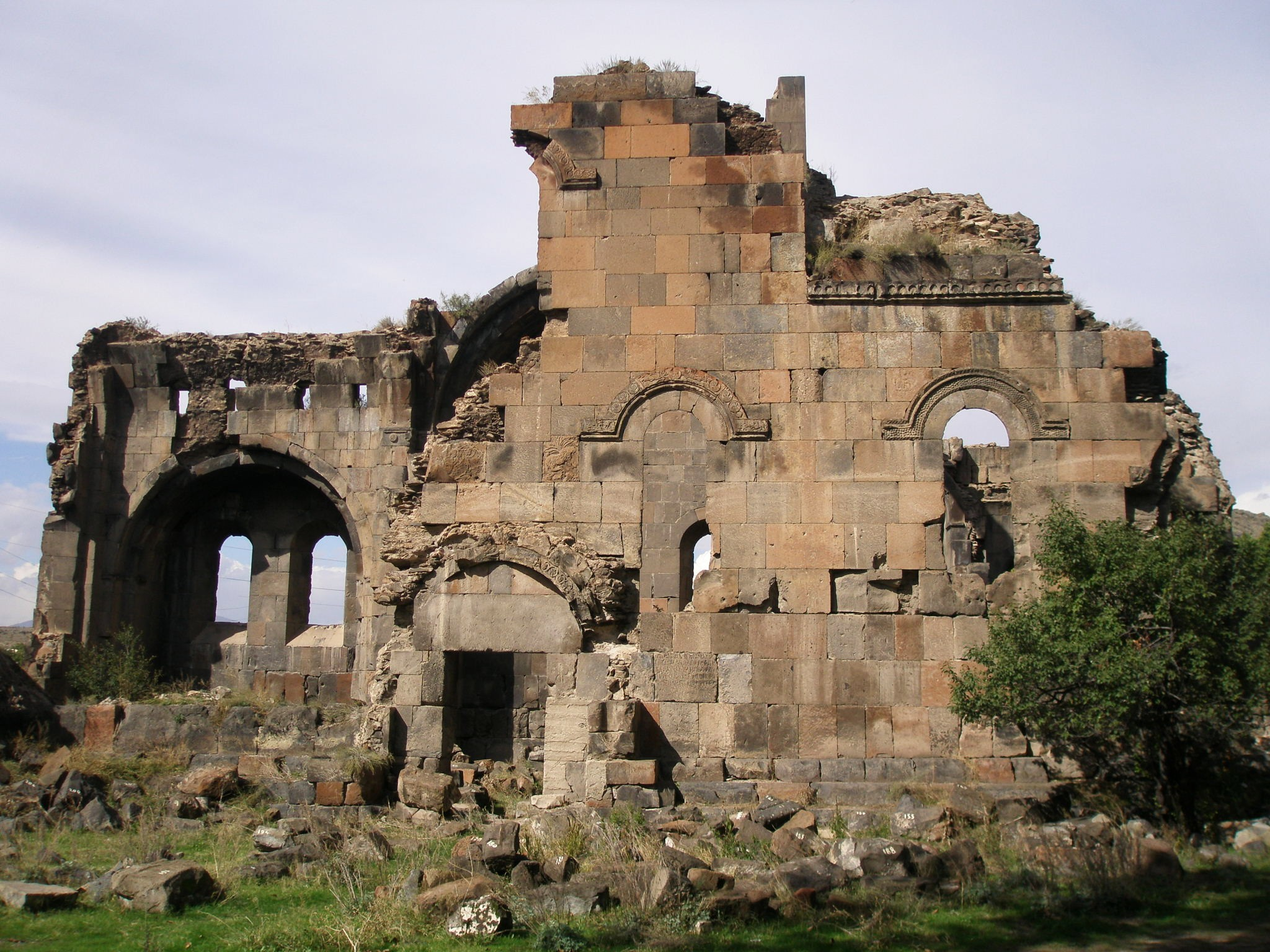
Another angle.

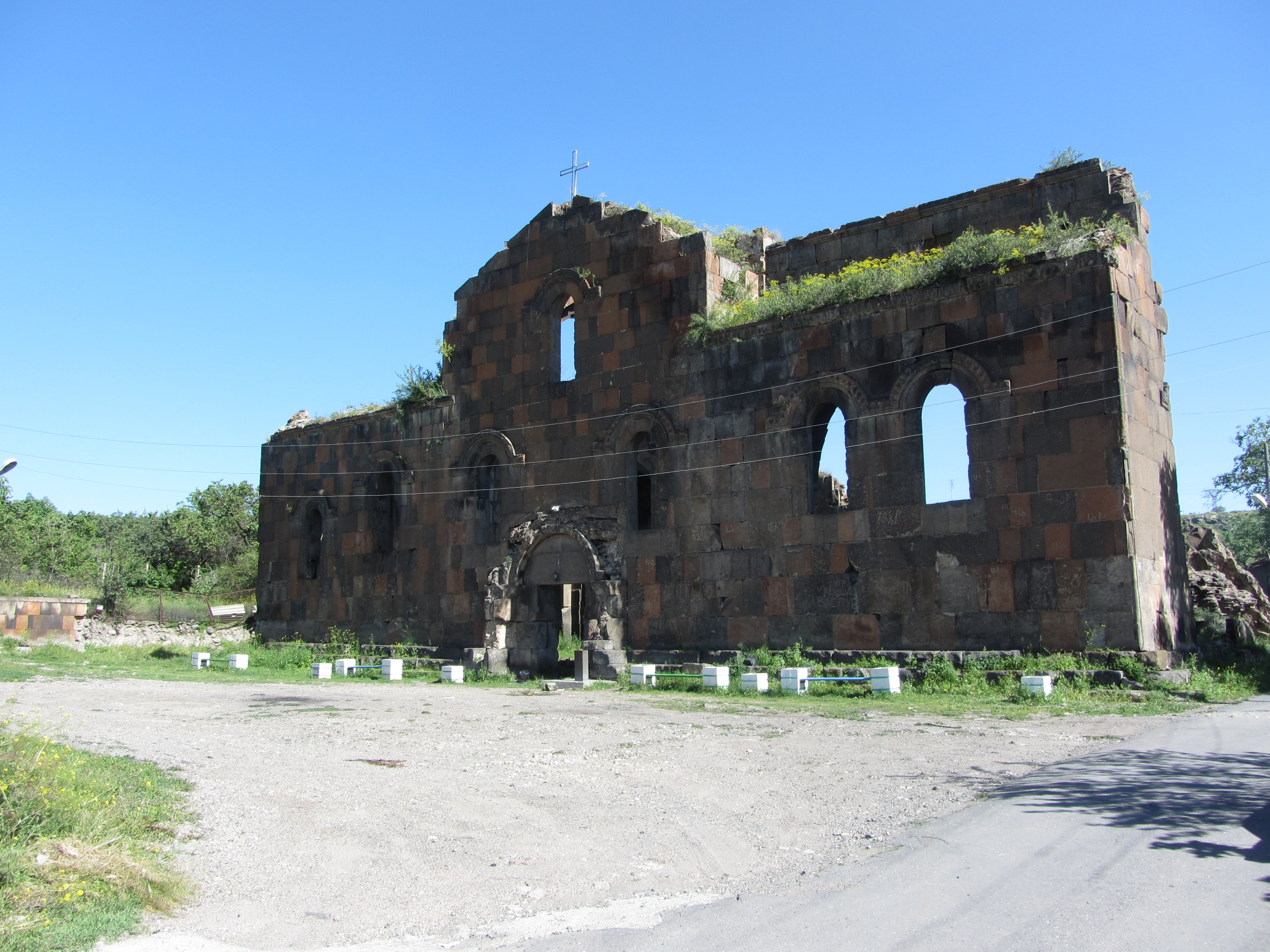
Ptghnavank monastery, general view

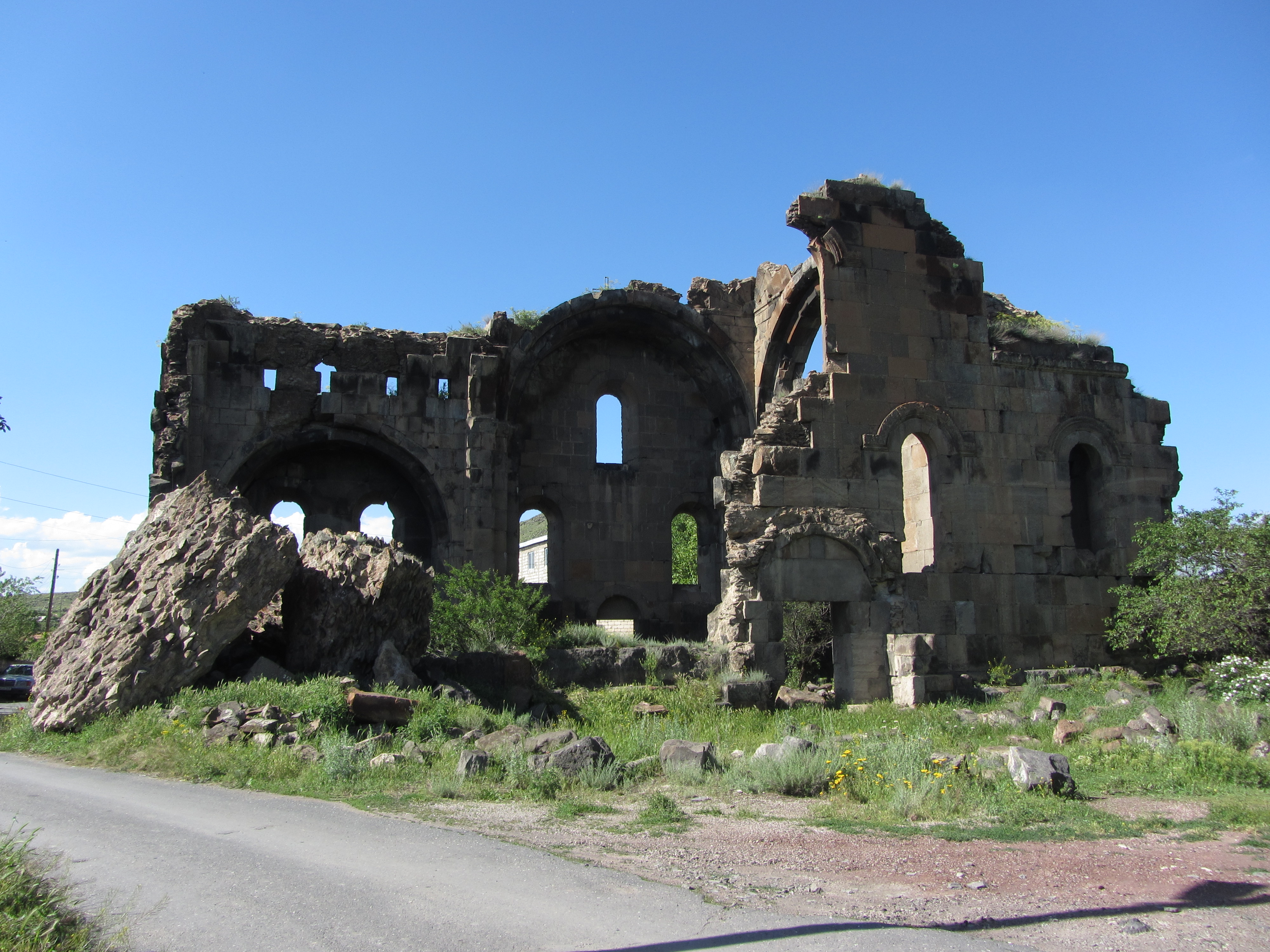
Ptghnavank monastery, south side

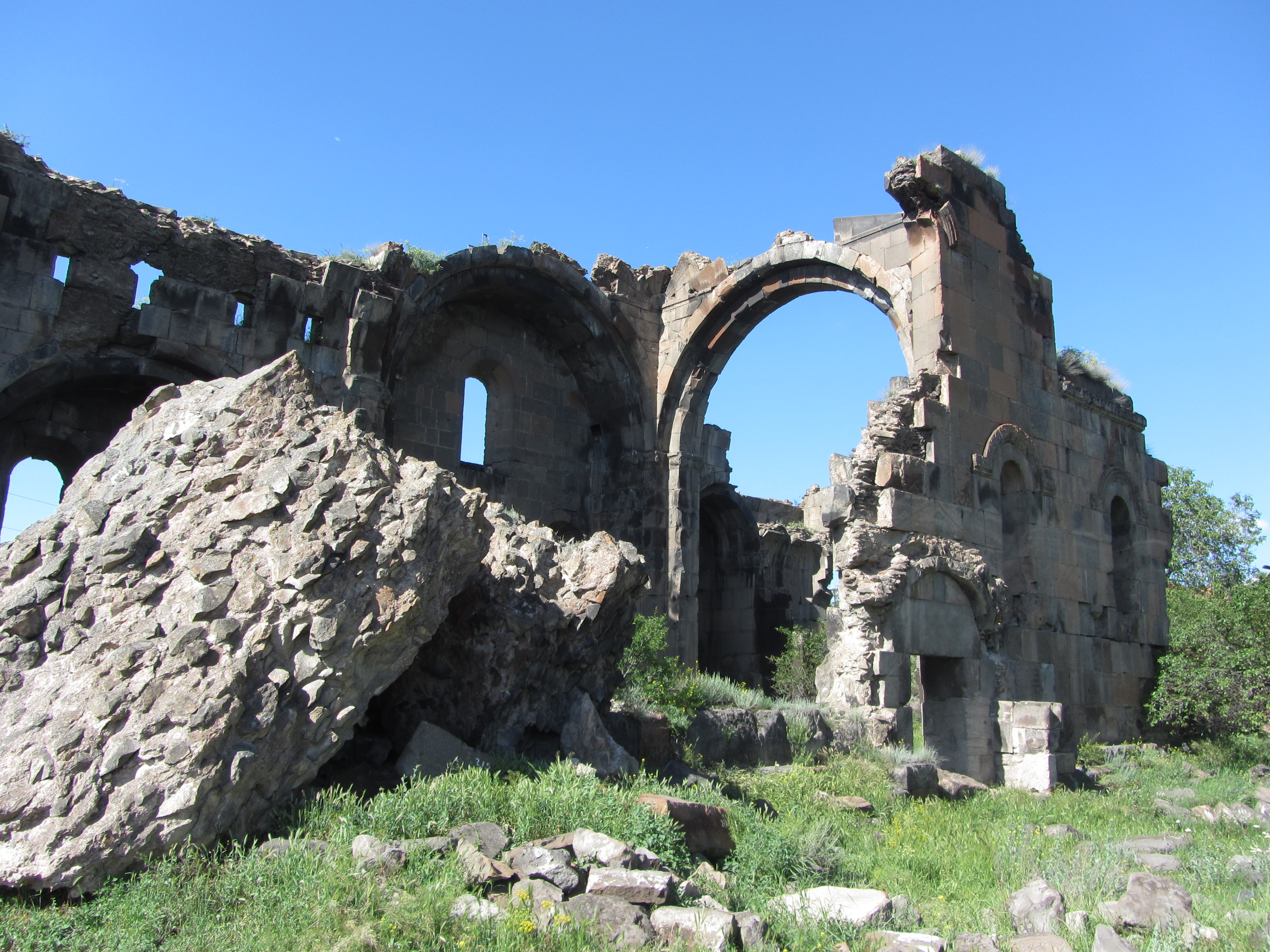
Ptghnavank monastery, arch

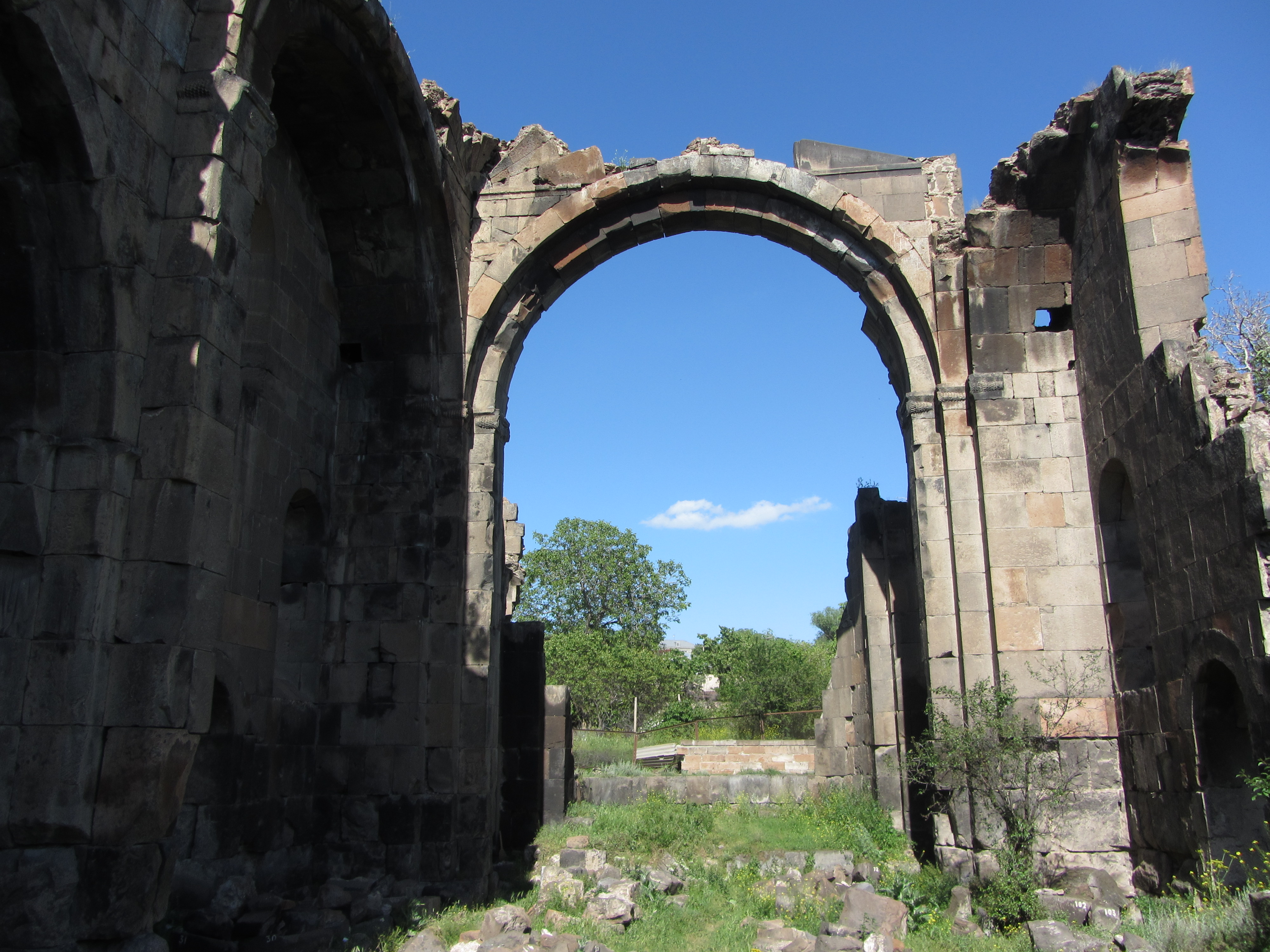
Ptghnavank monastery, arch

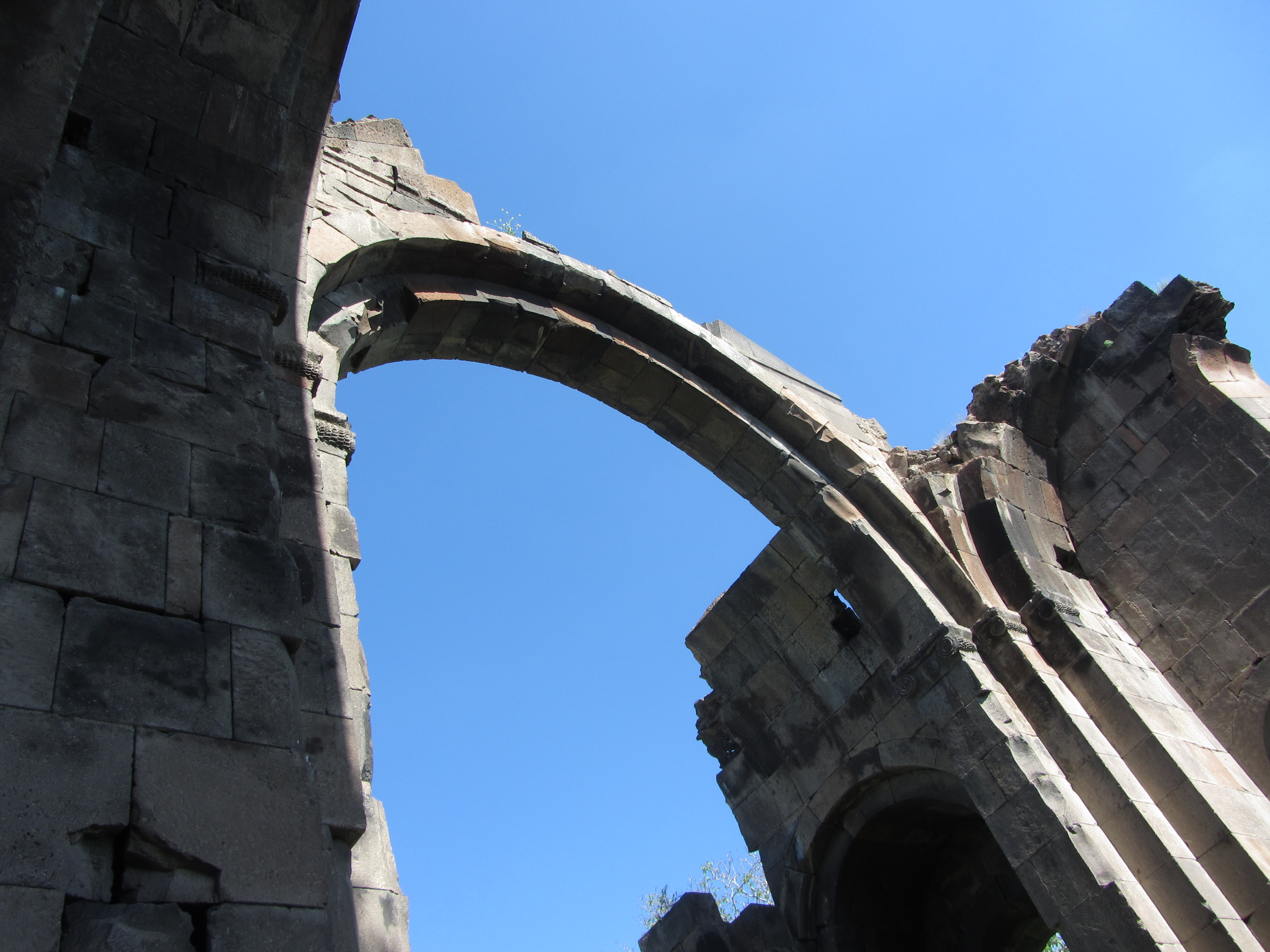
Ptghnavank monastery, arch

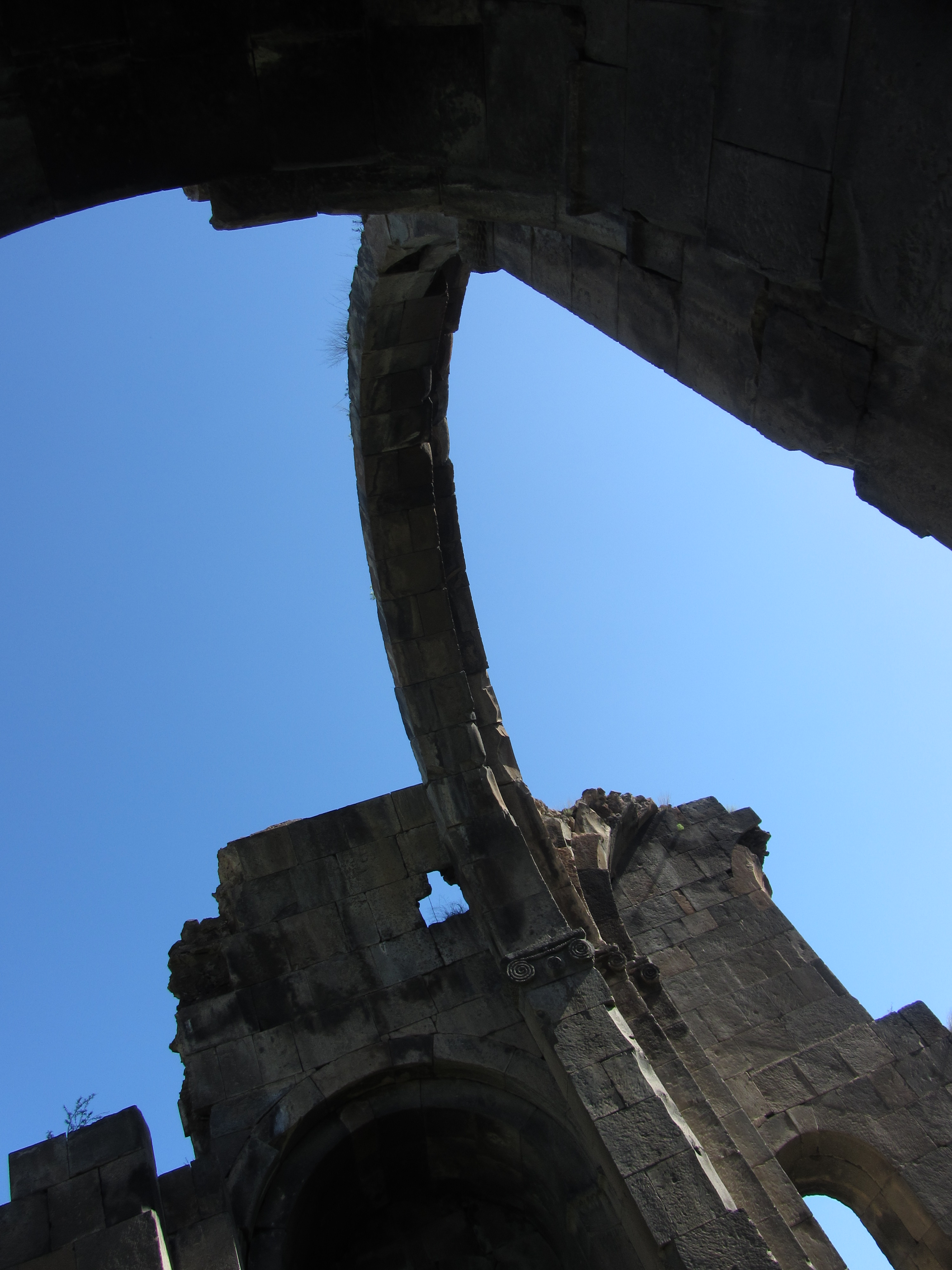
Ptghnavank monastery

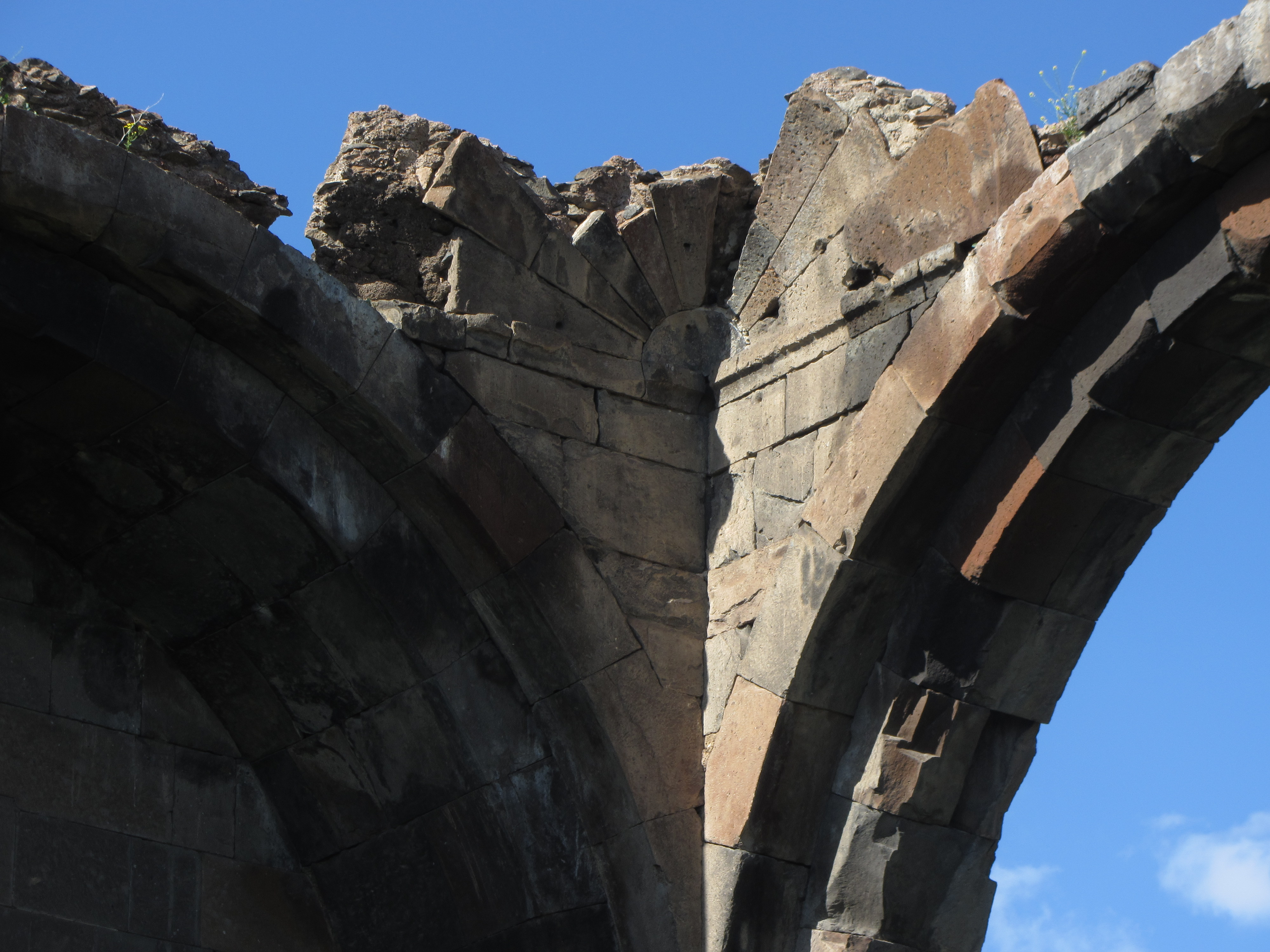
Ptghnavank monastery, decor

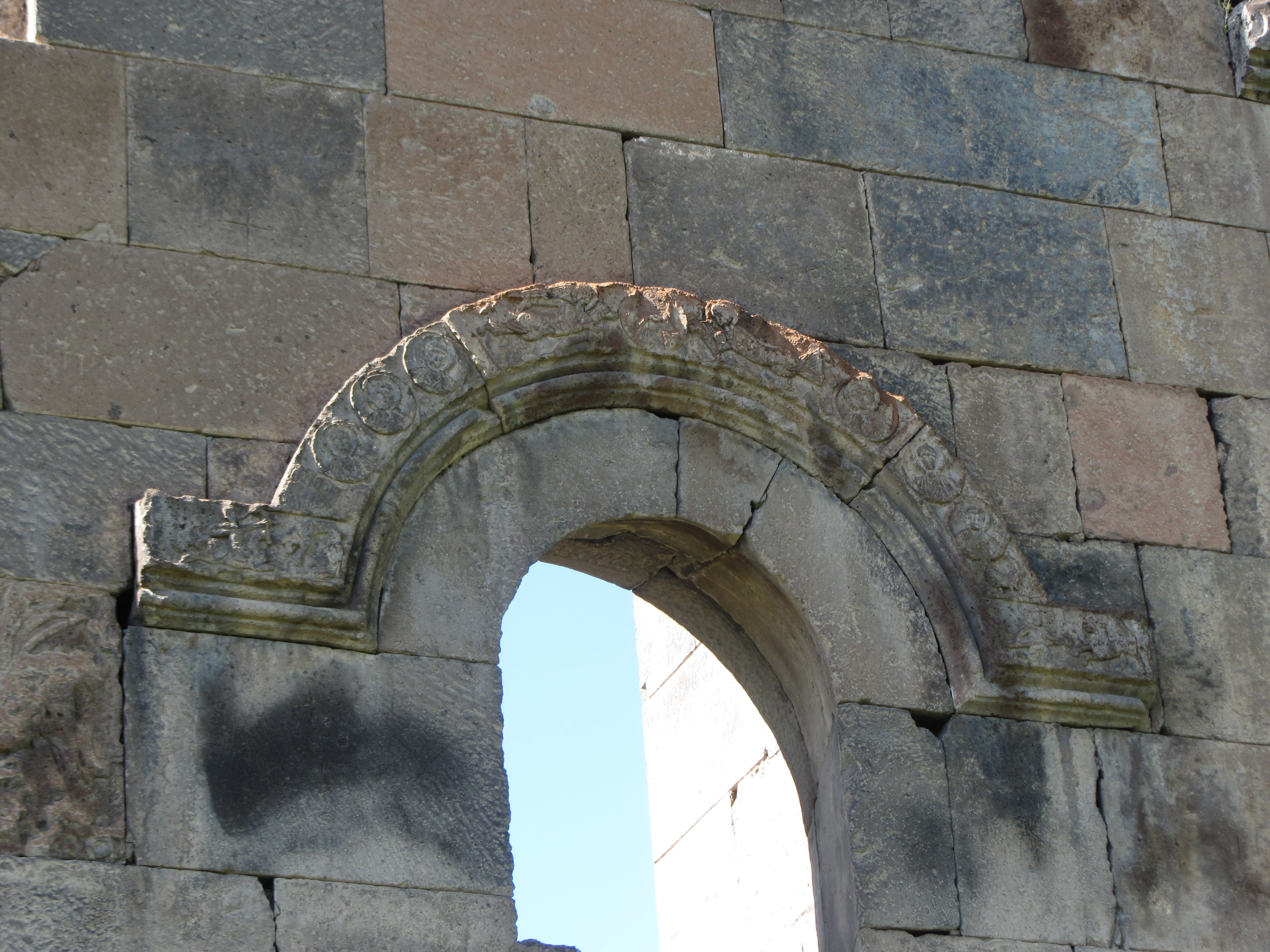
Ptghnavank monastery, decor

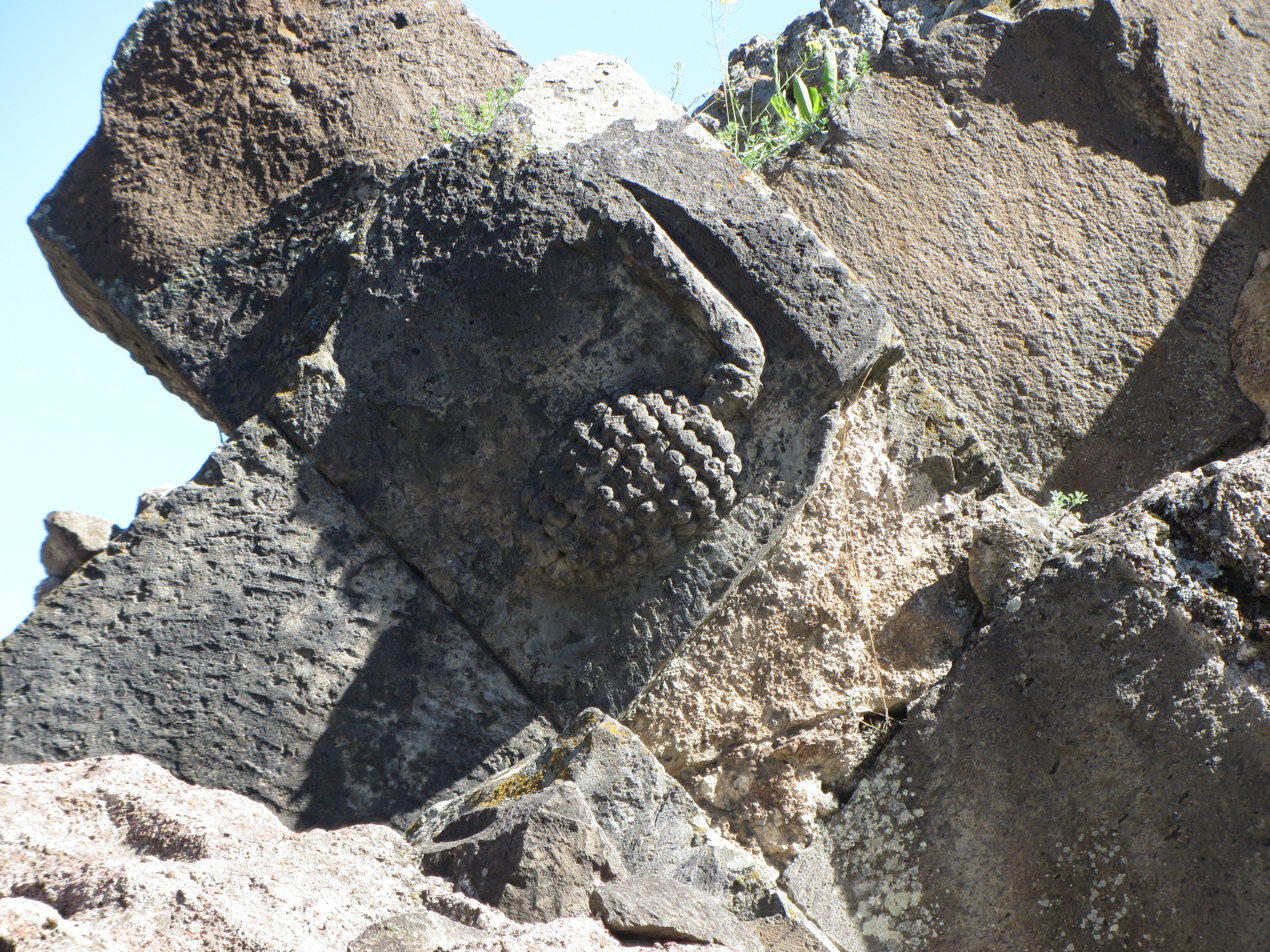
Ptghnavank monastery, decor
