= Babakishi =

Babakishi may refer to:

- Aghavnadzor, Kotayk, Armenia
- Buzhakan, Armenia
