= Aghavnadzor =

Aghavnadzor may refer to:

- Aghavnadzor, Kotayk, Armenia
- Aghavnadzor, Vayots Dzor, Armenia
