= Aghveran =

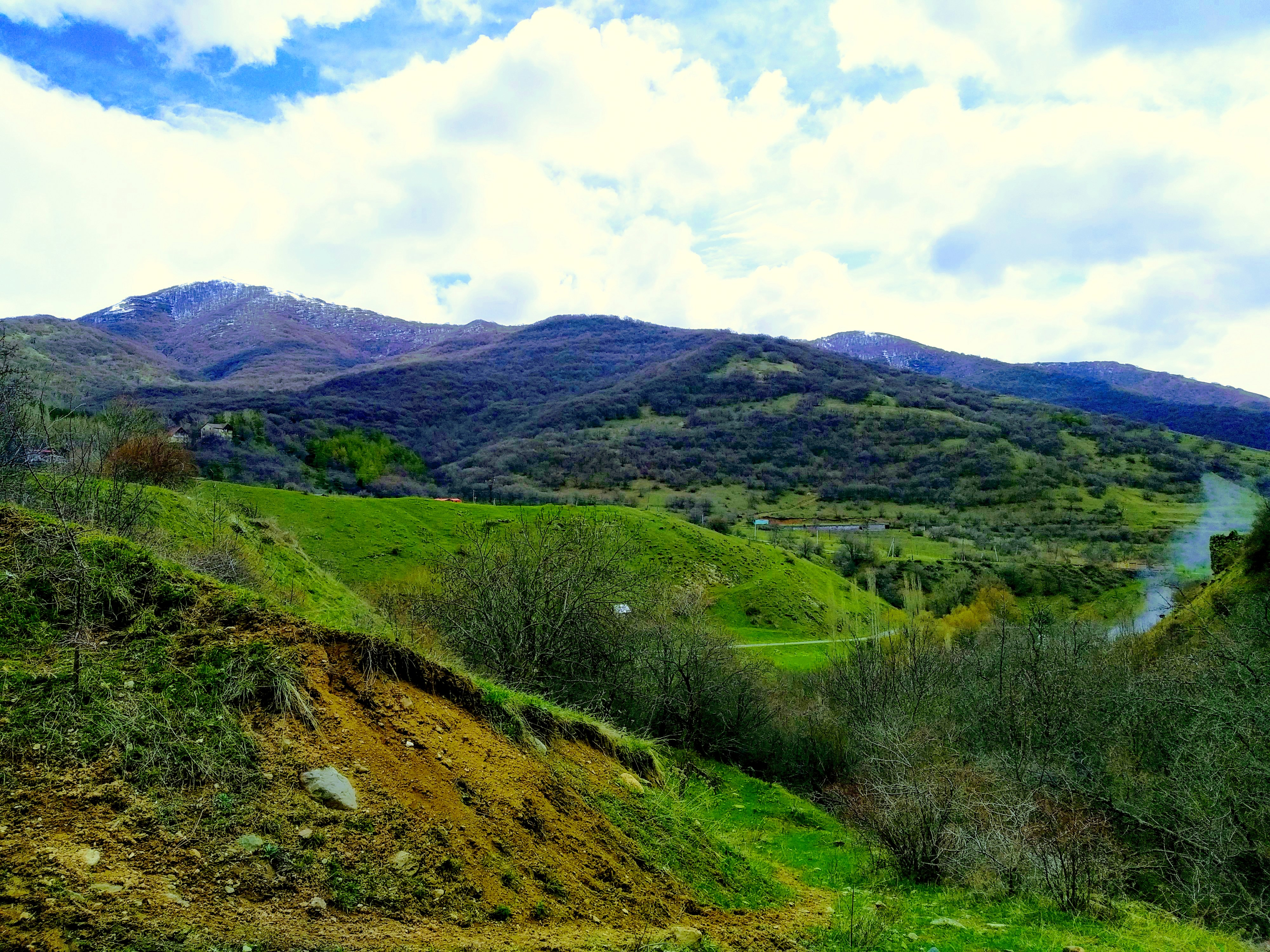

- Location within Armenia
- Coordinates: 40°31′46.83″N 44°33′47.09″E
- Country: Armenia
- Marz (Province): Kotayk
- Elevation: 1,980 m (6,500 ft)
- Time zone: UTC+4 ( )

Aghveran (Armenian: Աղվերան) is a mountain resort in the Kotayk Province of Armenia, within the municipality of Arzakan village, located to the north of Buzhakan village. It is situated on the Hrazdan River's right-side tributary of Dalar (Armenian: Դալար).

== Gallery ==
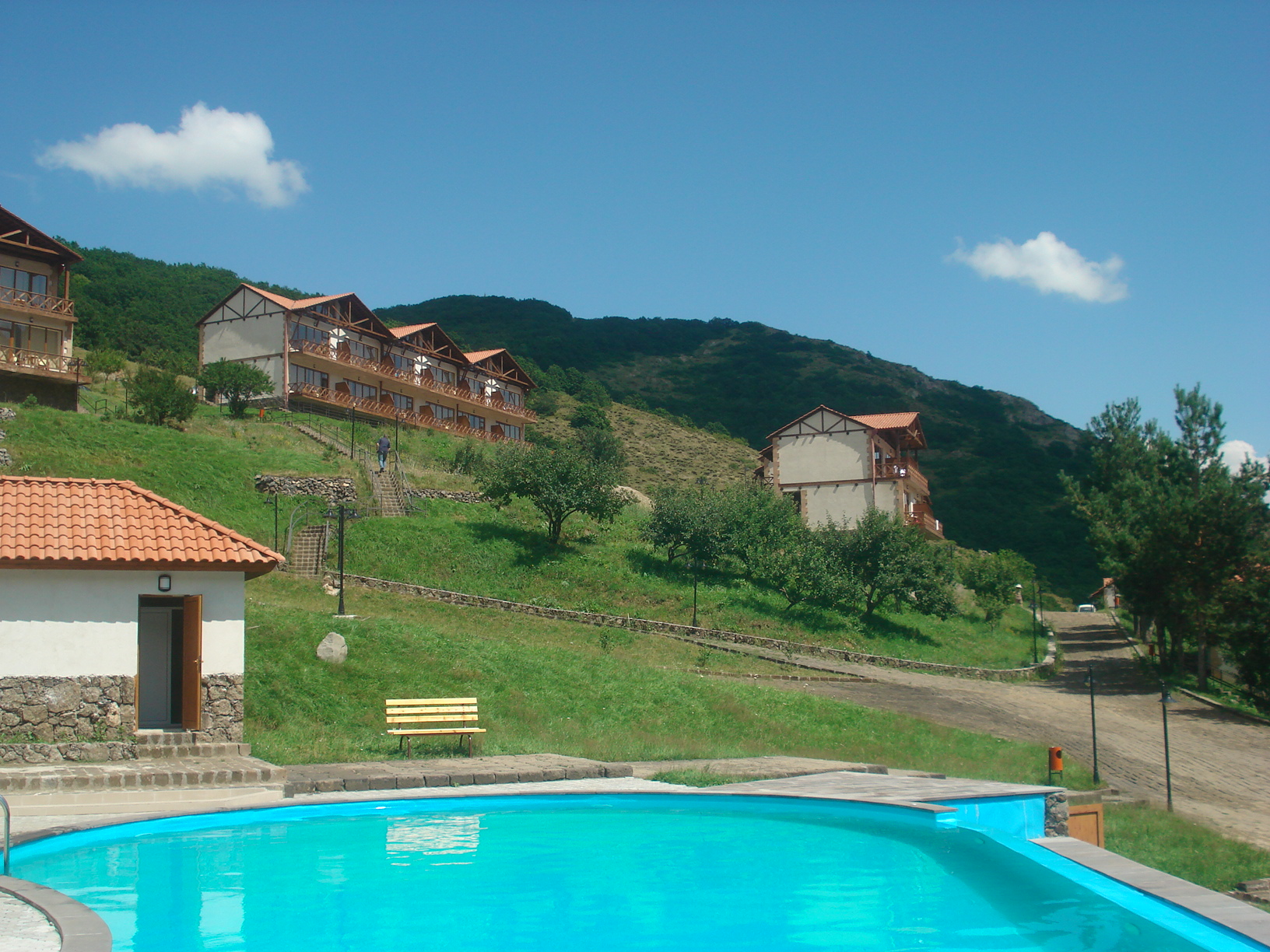
A resort in Aghveran

== See also ==
- Kotayk Province
