= Neghuts Monastery =

Monastery in Arzakan, Armenia

Neghuts Monastery Նեղուցի վանք
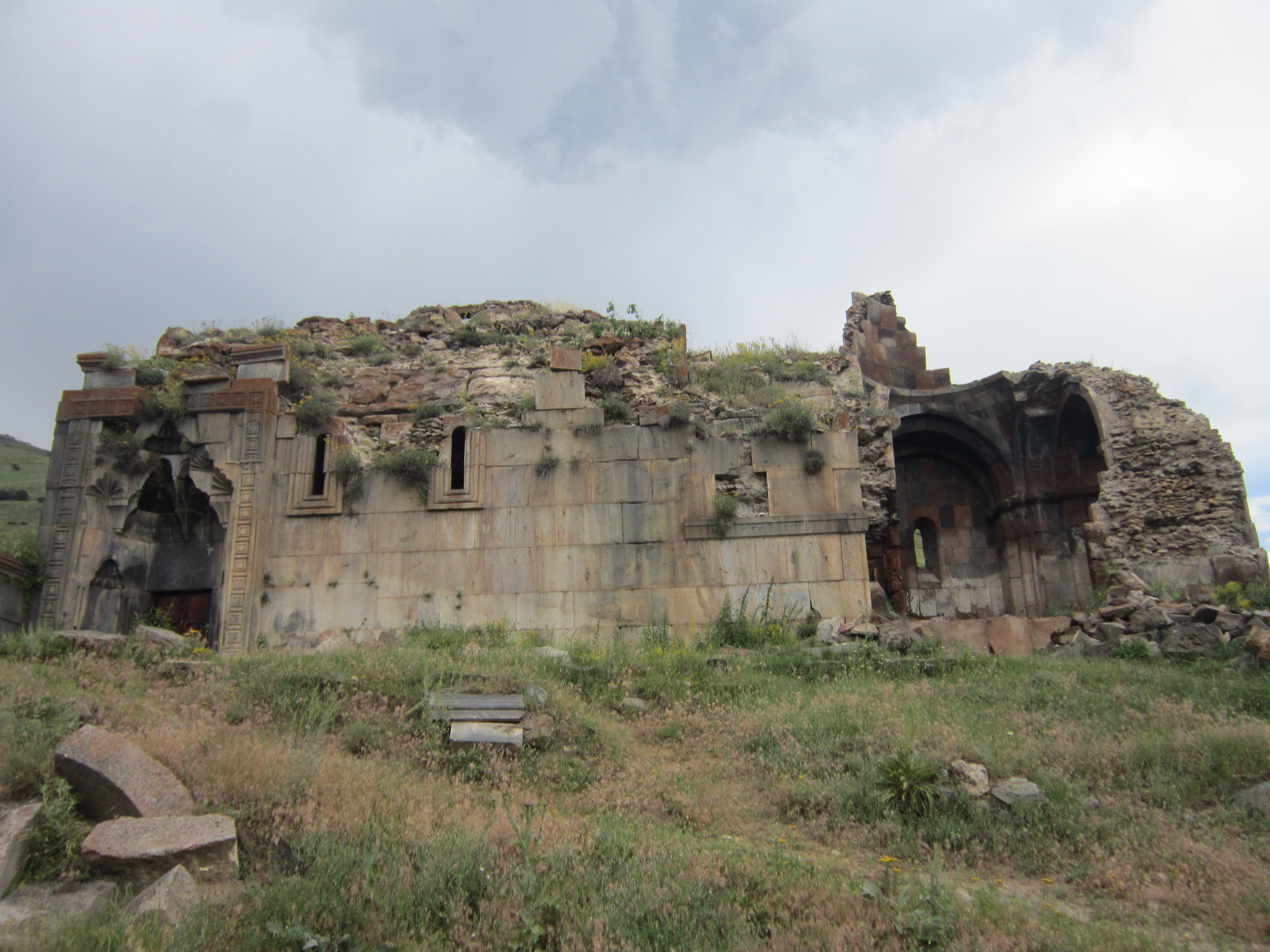
- Southeast view of S. Astvatsatsin Church at Neghutsi Vank, 10th-11th centuries

- Location within Armenia

Religion
- Affiliation: Armenian Apostolic Church
- Status: Abandoned/Ruins

Location
- Location: Near Arzakan, Kotayk Province, Armenia
- Coordinates: 40.456778°N 44.584795°E

Architecture
- Style: Armenian
- Completed: 10th or 11th century
- Domes: 2; above the church and gavit; both have since collapsed

Neghuts Monastery (Armenian: Նեղուցի վանք) is a monastery founded in the 10th or 11th century, situated in a clearing on a hillside overlooking a valley and the village of Arzakan in the Kotayk Province of Armenia. The monastery is located approximately 2 kilometres (1.2 mi) northwest of the village center. There are other churches in the vicinity, most notably the 13th-century monastic/church ruins of Ghuki Vank, the church ruins of S. Astvatsatsin (1207), and the 13th-century ruins of Surb Gevorg.

== Architecture ==
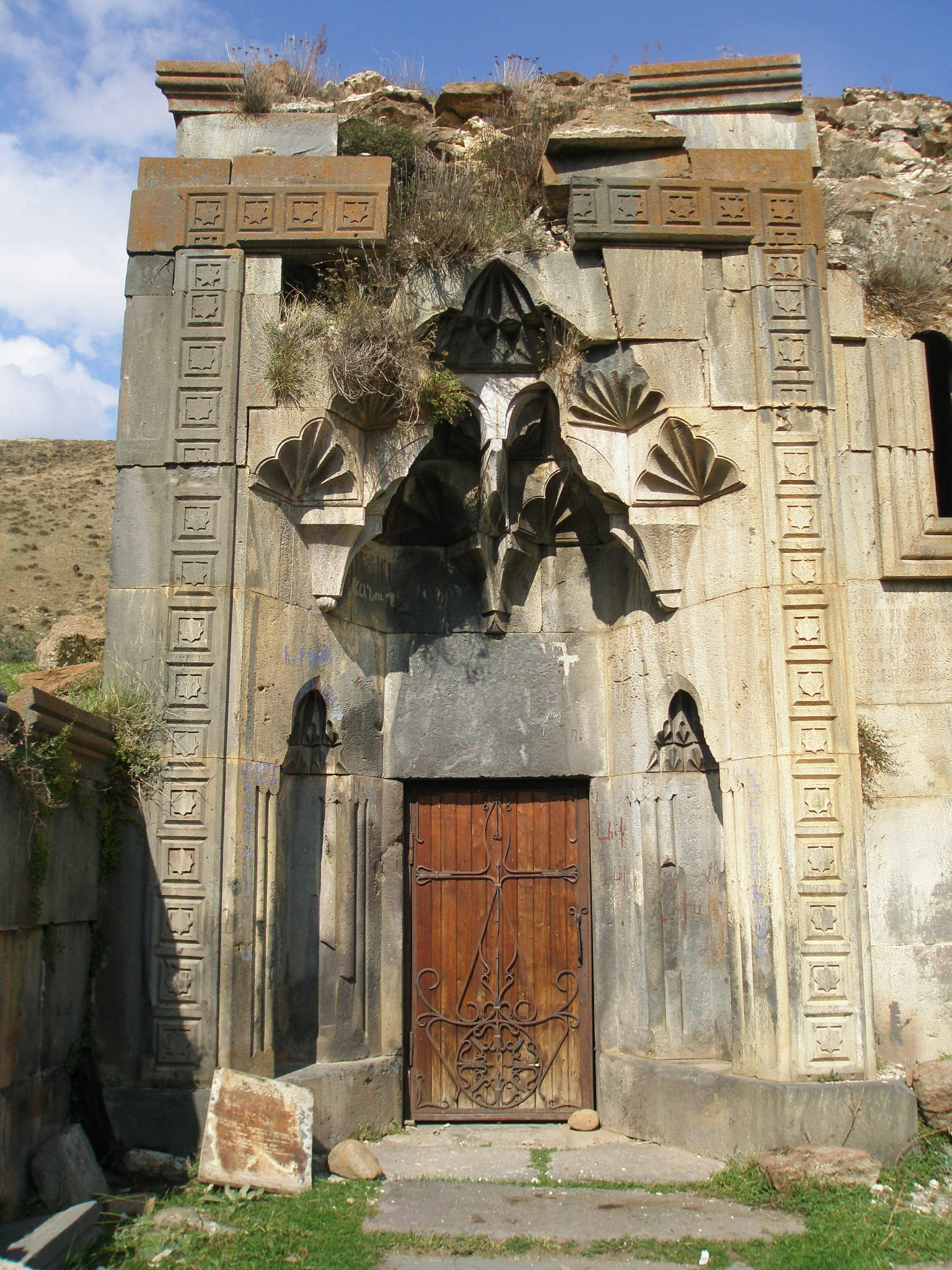
South entrance to the adjoining gavit of S. Astvatsatsin Church

The monastery consists of the Church of Surb Astvatsatsin (Holy Mother of God) with a large adjoining gavit. Just south of and adjacent to the church and gavit, are the remains of a rectangular depression of a building that had once consisted of two rooms. There are the remnants of a large doorway and four columns. It may have served as a small church with a gavit. Further upon the hill east of the main church, is a medieval cemetery with a small chapel.

S. Astvatsatsin Church has three walls that have remained intact, while its southern wall and most of the drum and dome have since collapsed. The structure is relatively unadorned in comparison to its adjoining gavit. It has narrow windows at the north wall and altar, and would have presumably had another at the south wall. A portal leads into the gavit of the church from the west, directly across from the altar.

The gavit abuts the hillside at its northwestern wall. All of the original walls, ceiling, and parts of the dome remain standing, while the exterior has not fared so well. Access to the gavit is through either the main and elaborately decorated entry at the south wall, an alternative entry at the opposite (north) wall, or from S. Astvatsatsin as mentioned earlier. Four very large columns support the vaulting that bears the weight of the roof above. The vaulting for the dome consists of six intersecting arches that form an oculus in the center to let light into the space. Several 13th-century inscriptions may be found upon the walls, columns, capitals, and arches. There are some large low-relief carvings of khachkars on the walls as well.

== Gallery ==
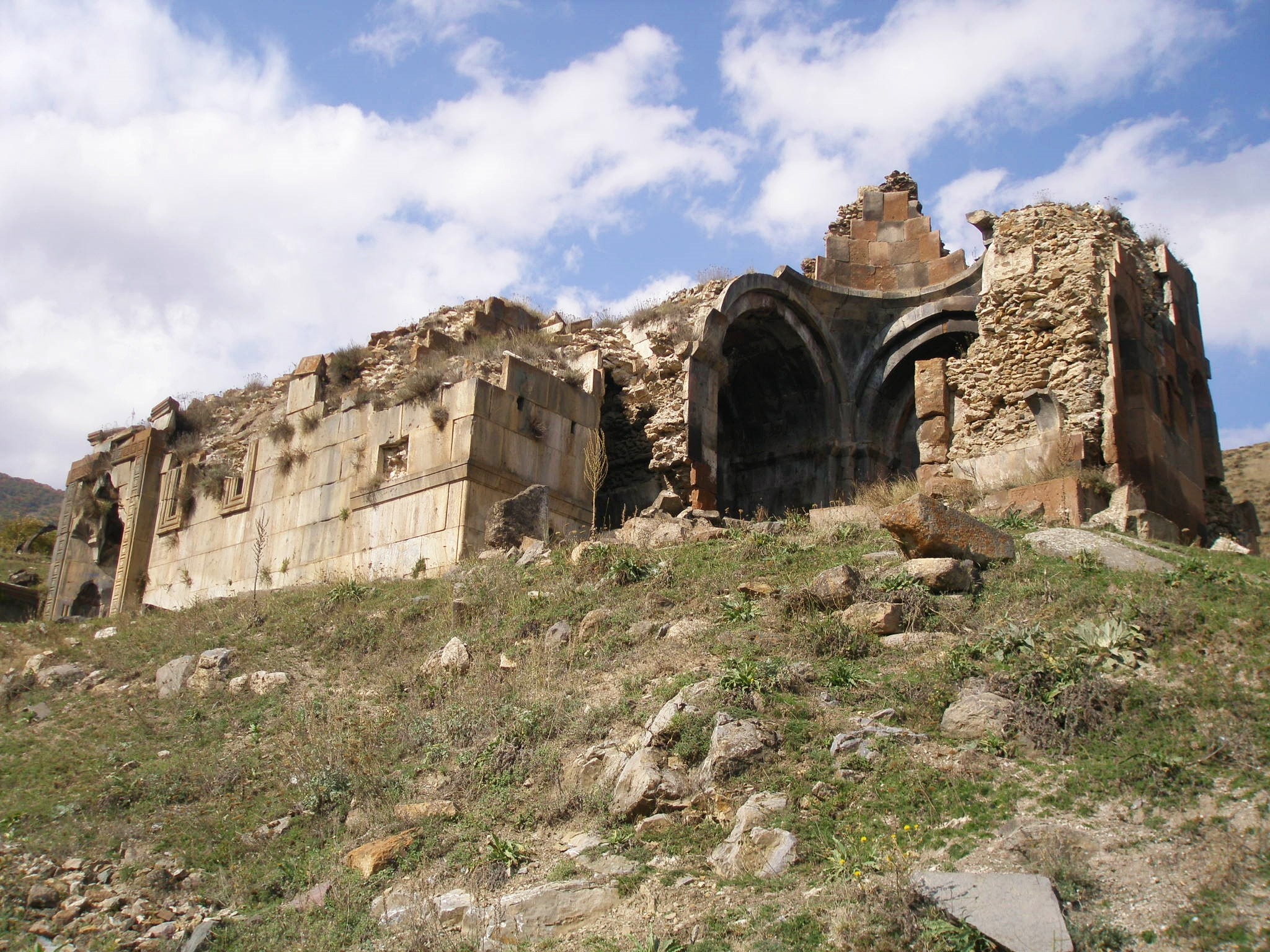

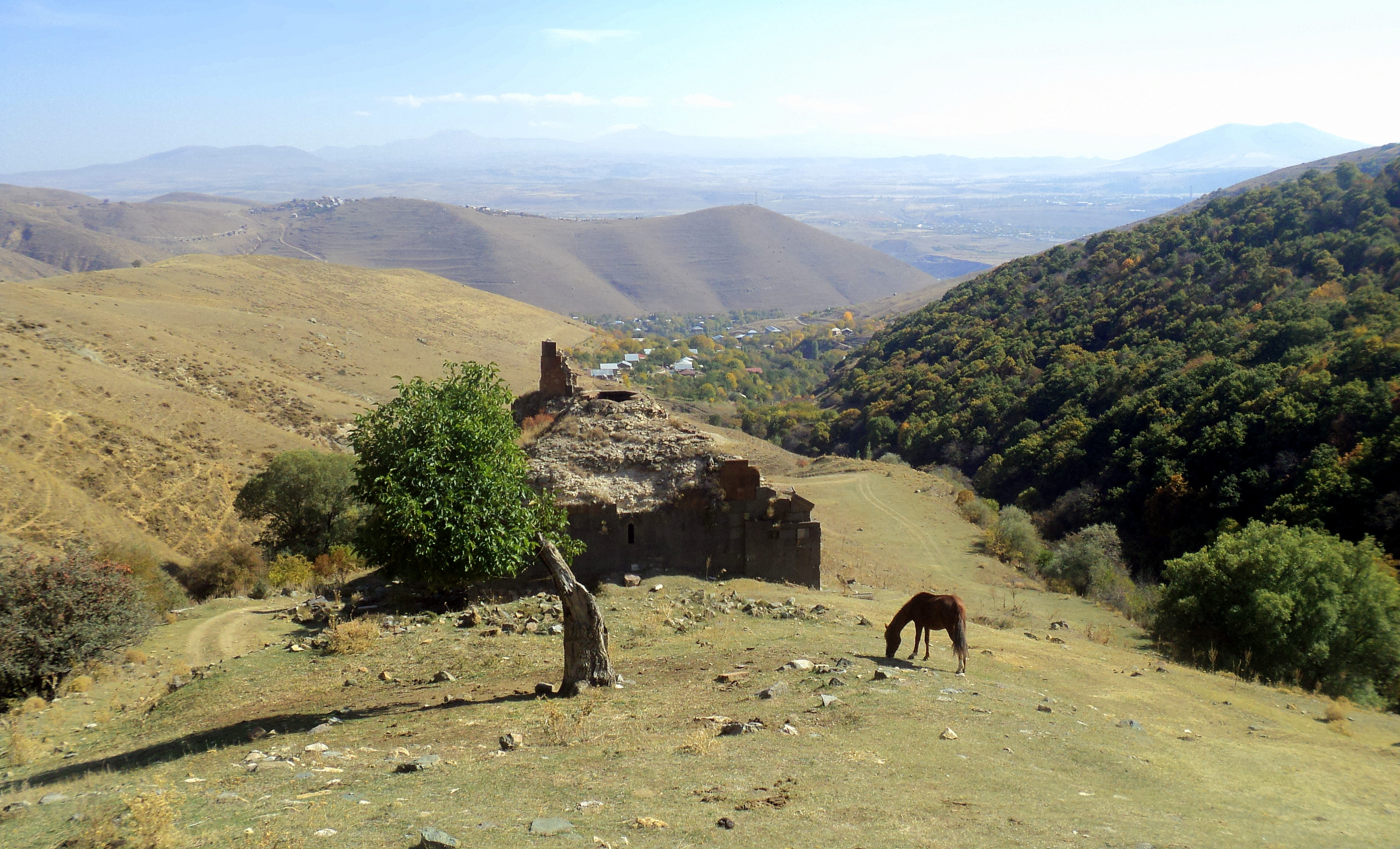
View of Neghutsi Vank and Arzakan in the background

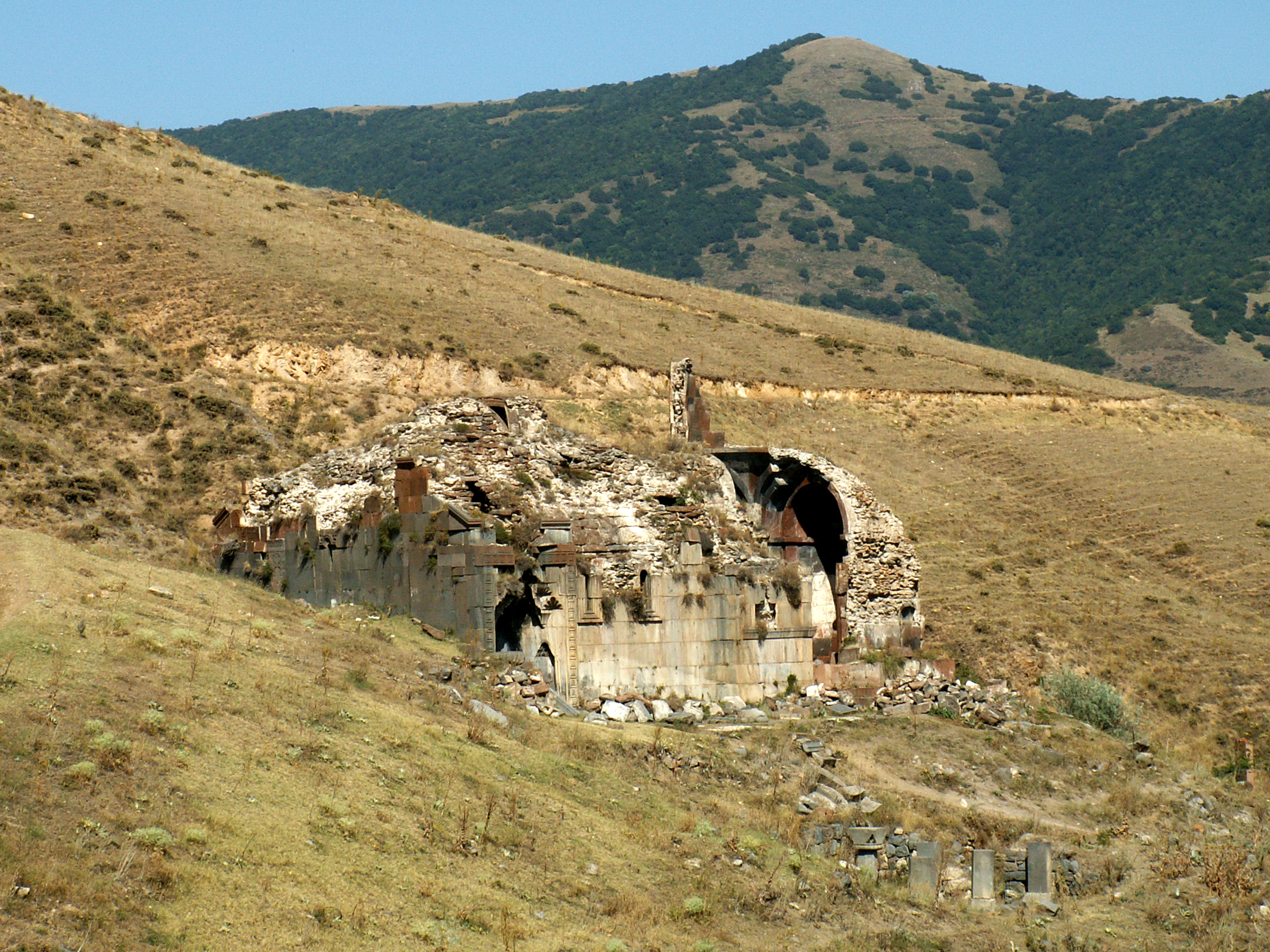
View of the monastery

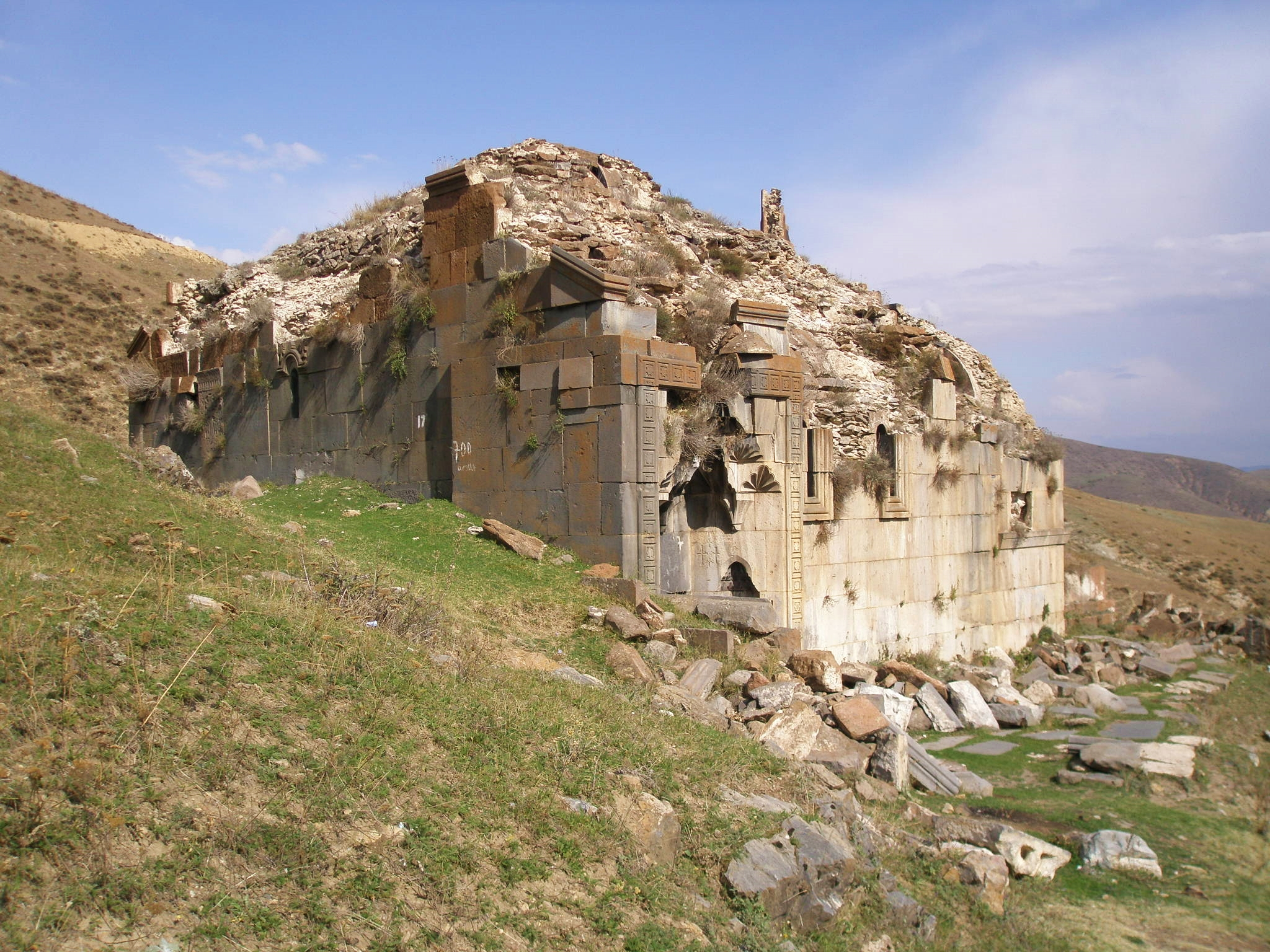
Southwest view of the monastery

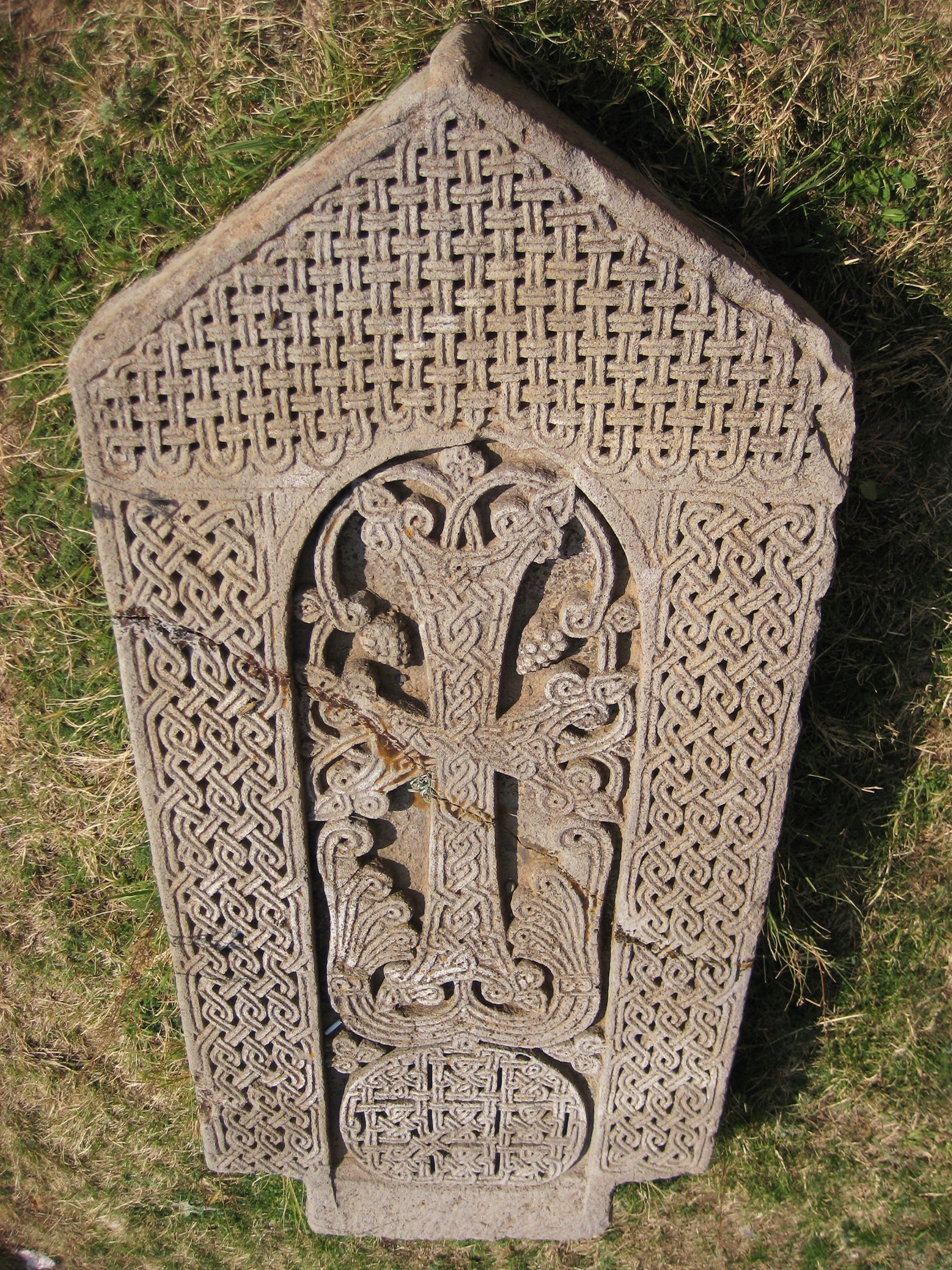
Large khachkar near S. Astvatsatsin

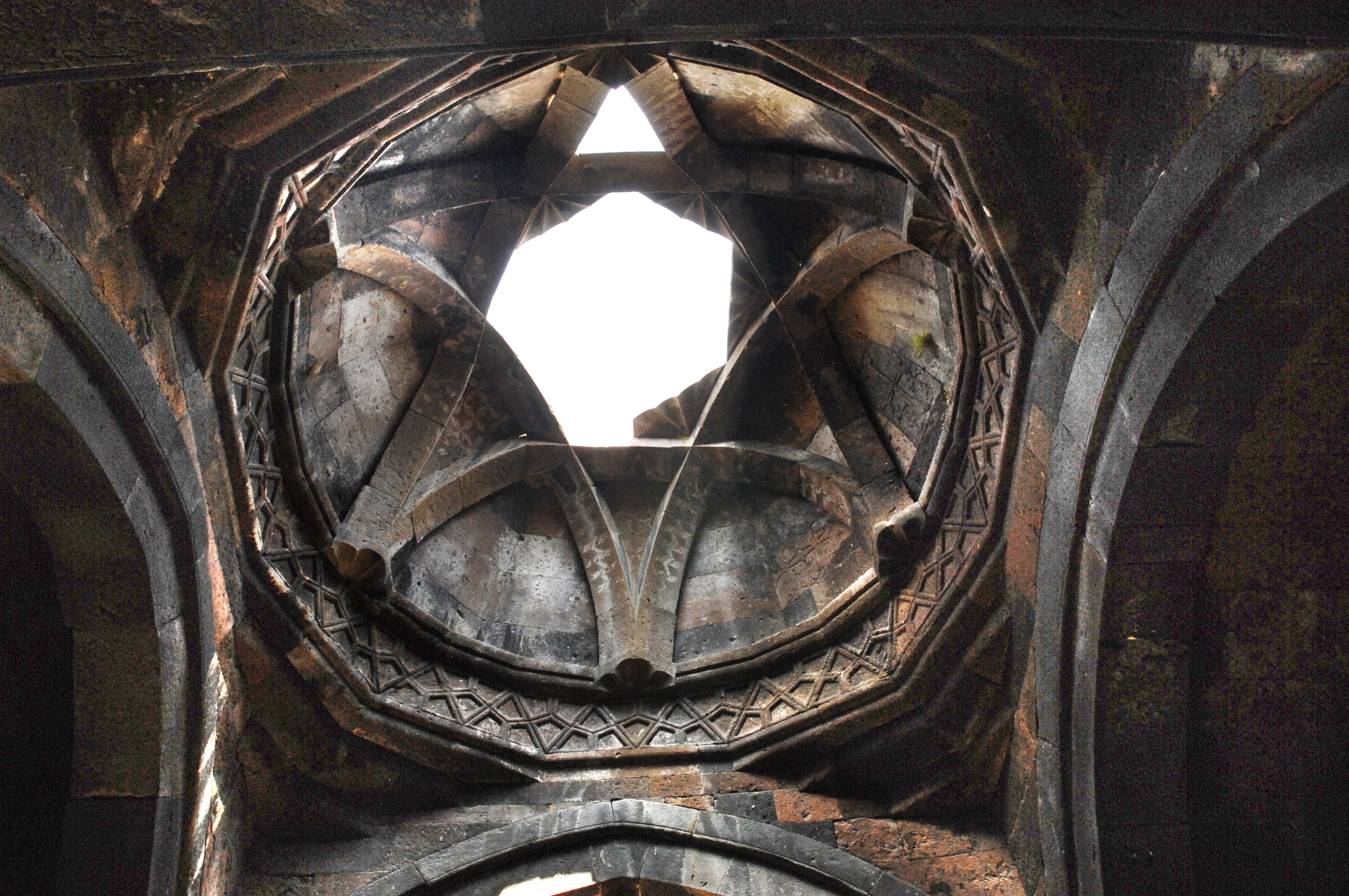
Gavit dome

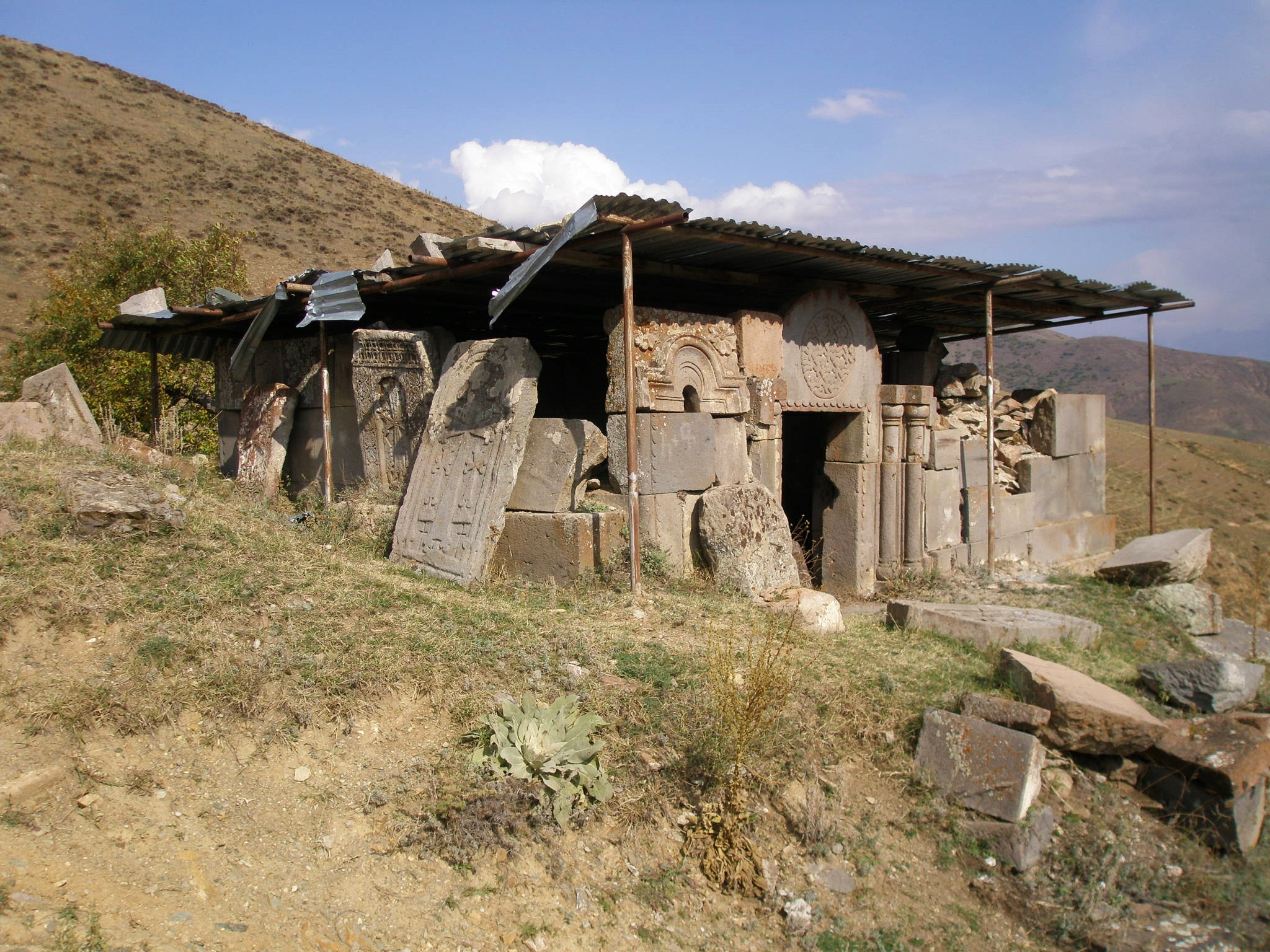
Southwest view of the chapel

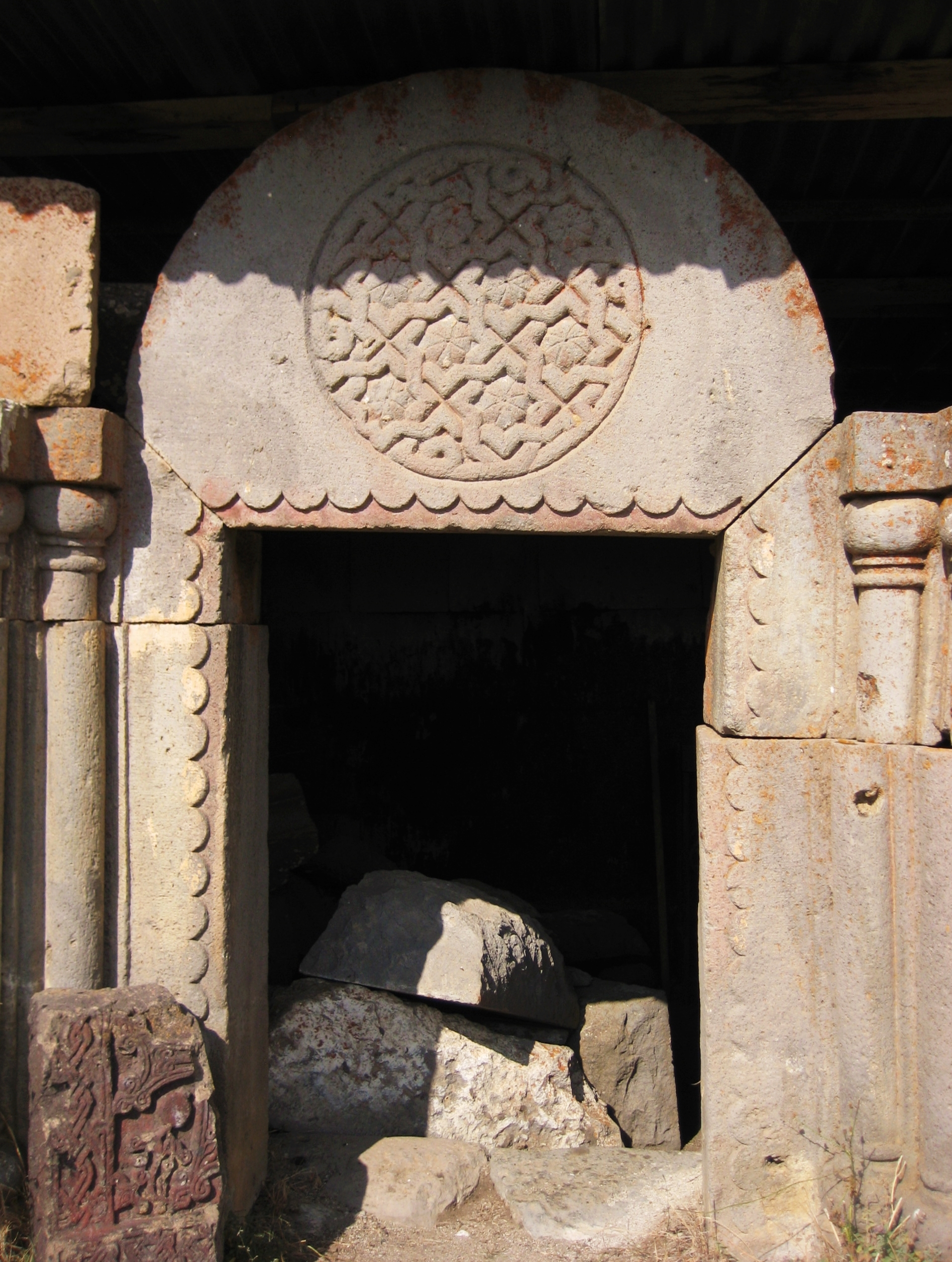
Chapel door
