= Arzakan =

Arzakan Արզական
- Village
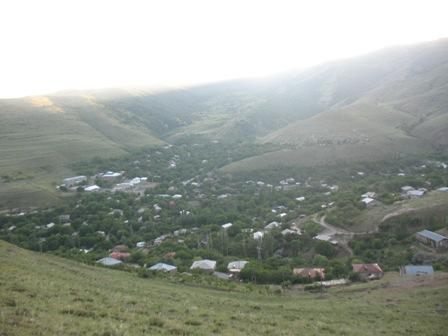
- Arzakan

- Location within Armenia
- Coordinates: 40°26′58″N 44°36′23″E
- Country: Armenia
- Province: Kotayk

Population (2011)
  - Total: 2,390

Arzakan (Armenian: Արզական, previously known as Arzakyand), is a village in the Kotayk Province of Armenia. The Aghveran resort is located in Arzakan. There are the large ruins of the 10th- or 11th-century Neghutsi Vank, located along a ravine to the northwest of the village. There are also the 13th-century monastic ruins of Ghuki Vank and 13th-century ruins of Surb Gevorg in the vicinity.

== Gallery ==
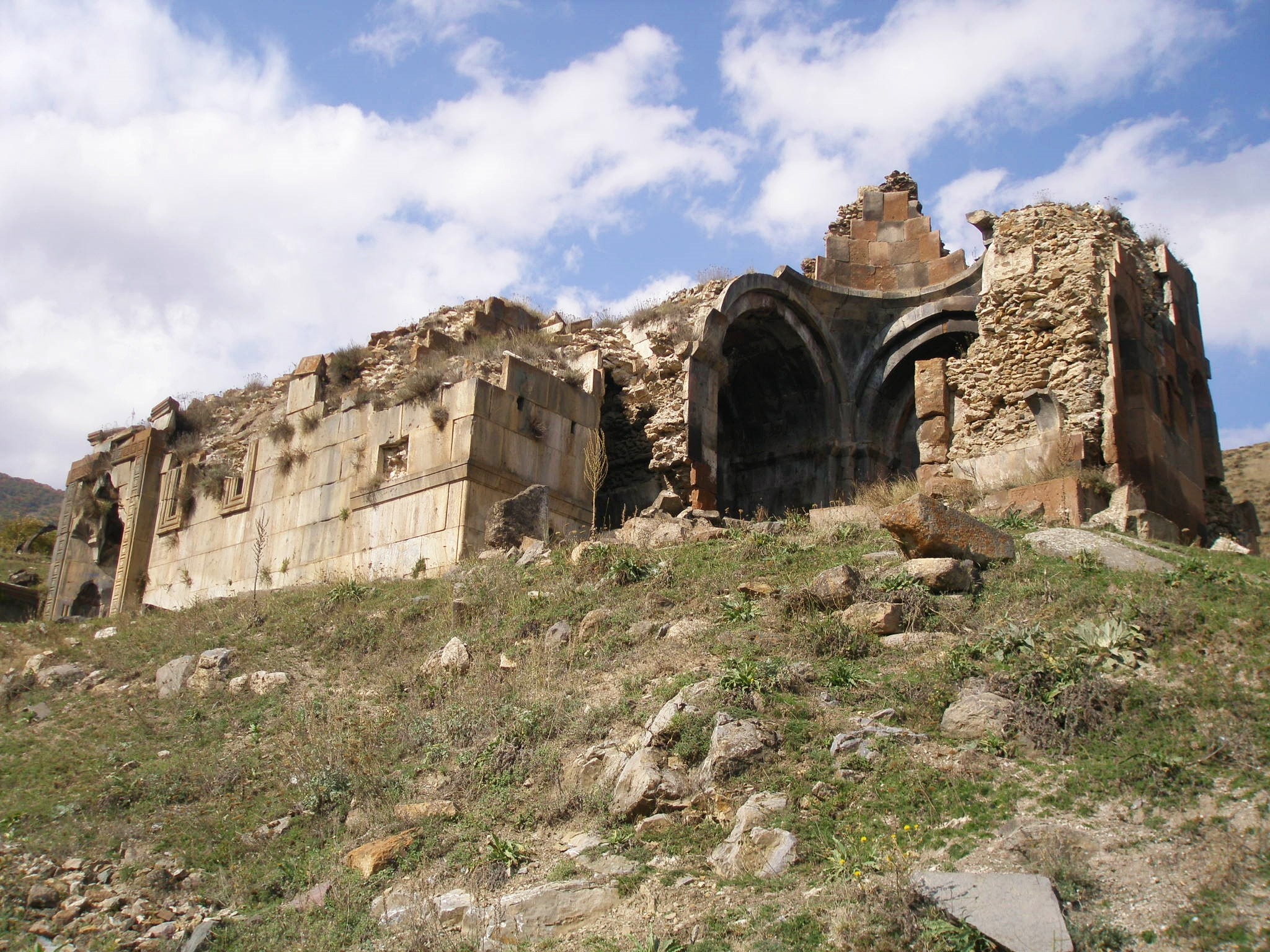
S. Astvatsatsin Church at Neghutsi Vank, 10th-11th centuries

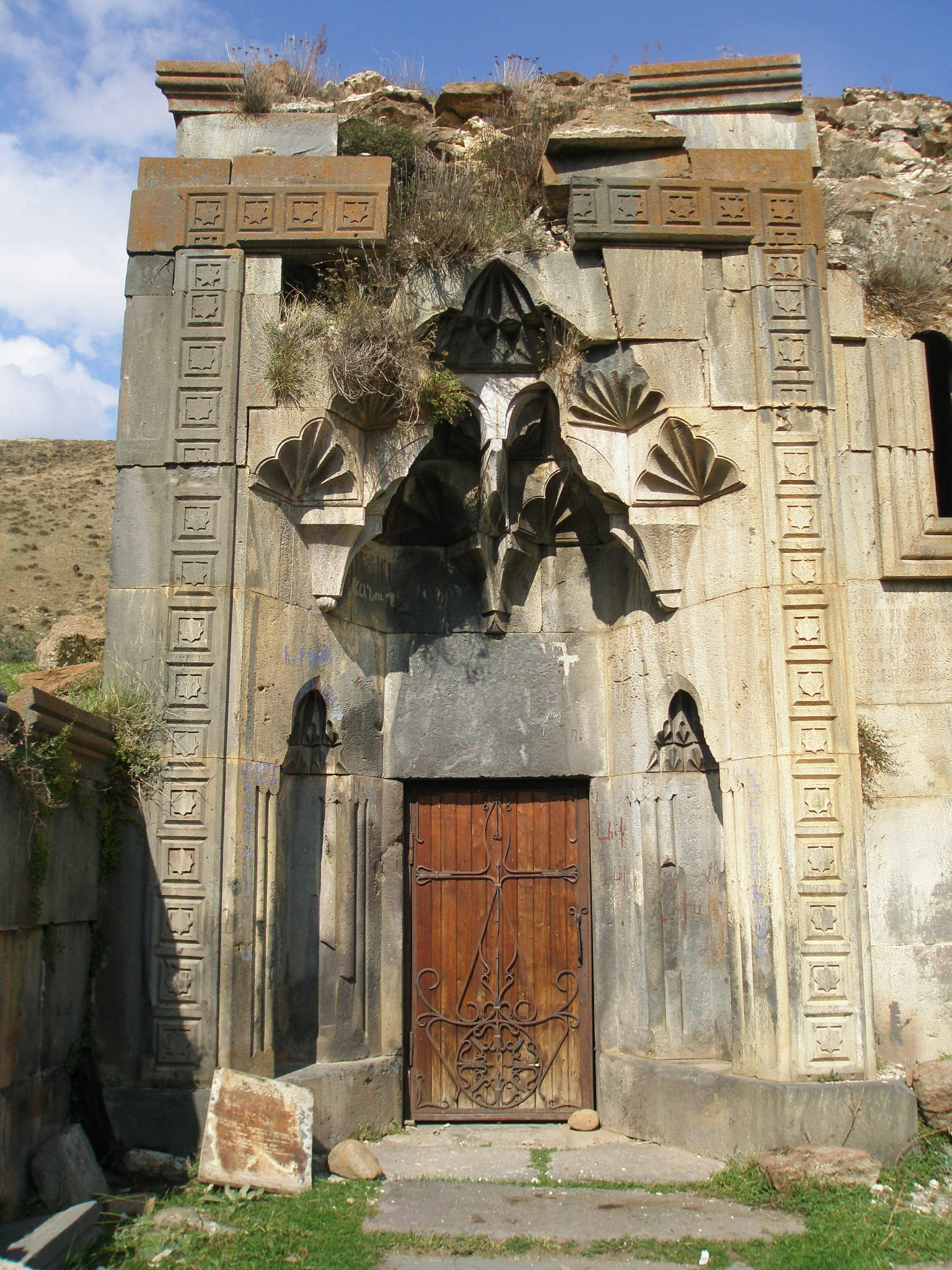
South entrance to the gavit at Neghutsi Vank

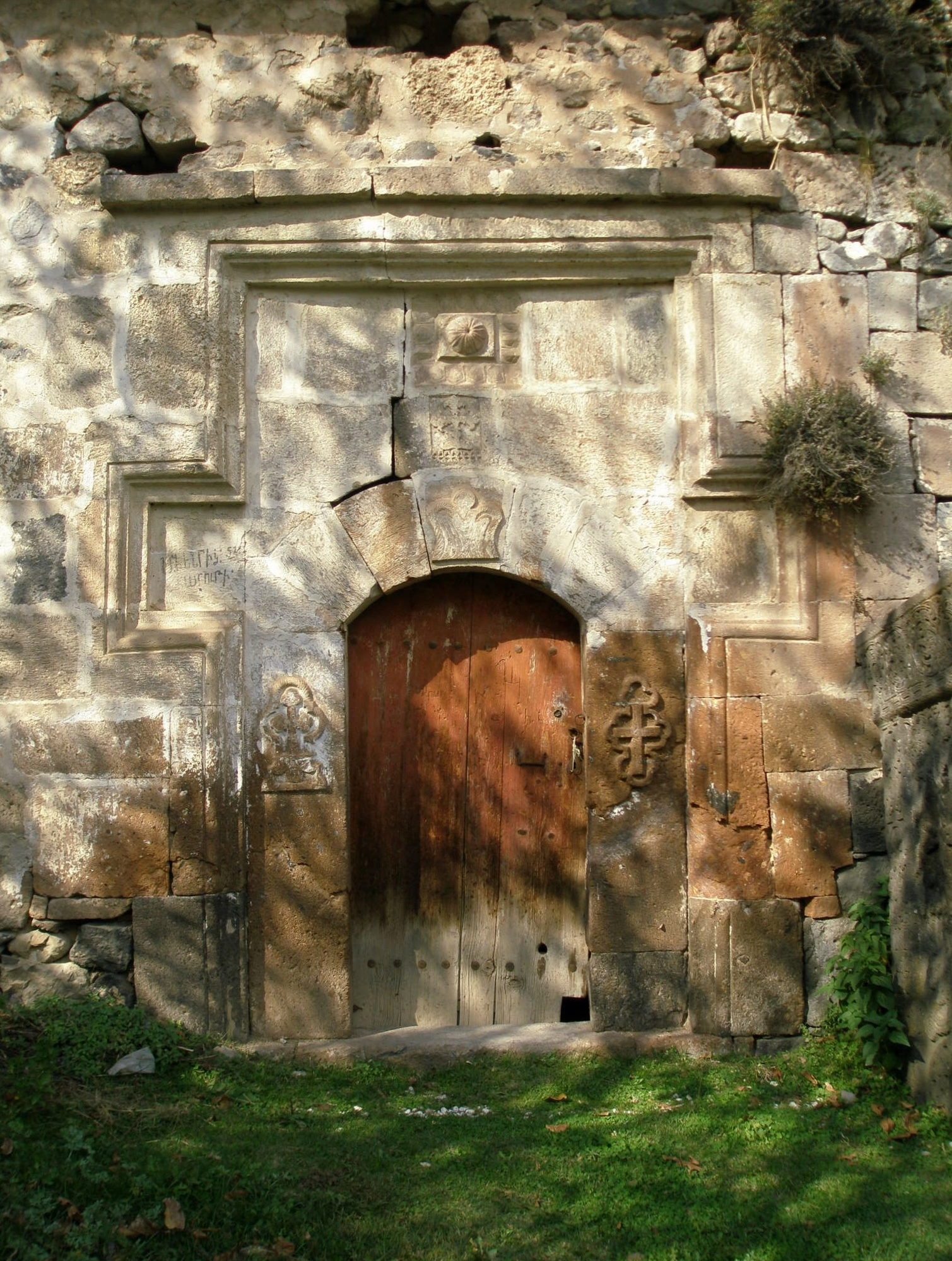
Village church door

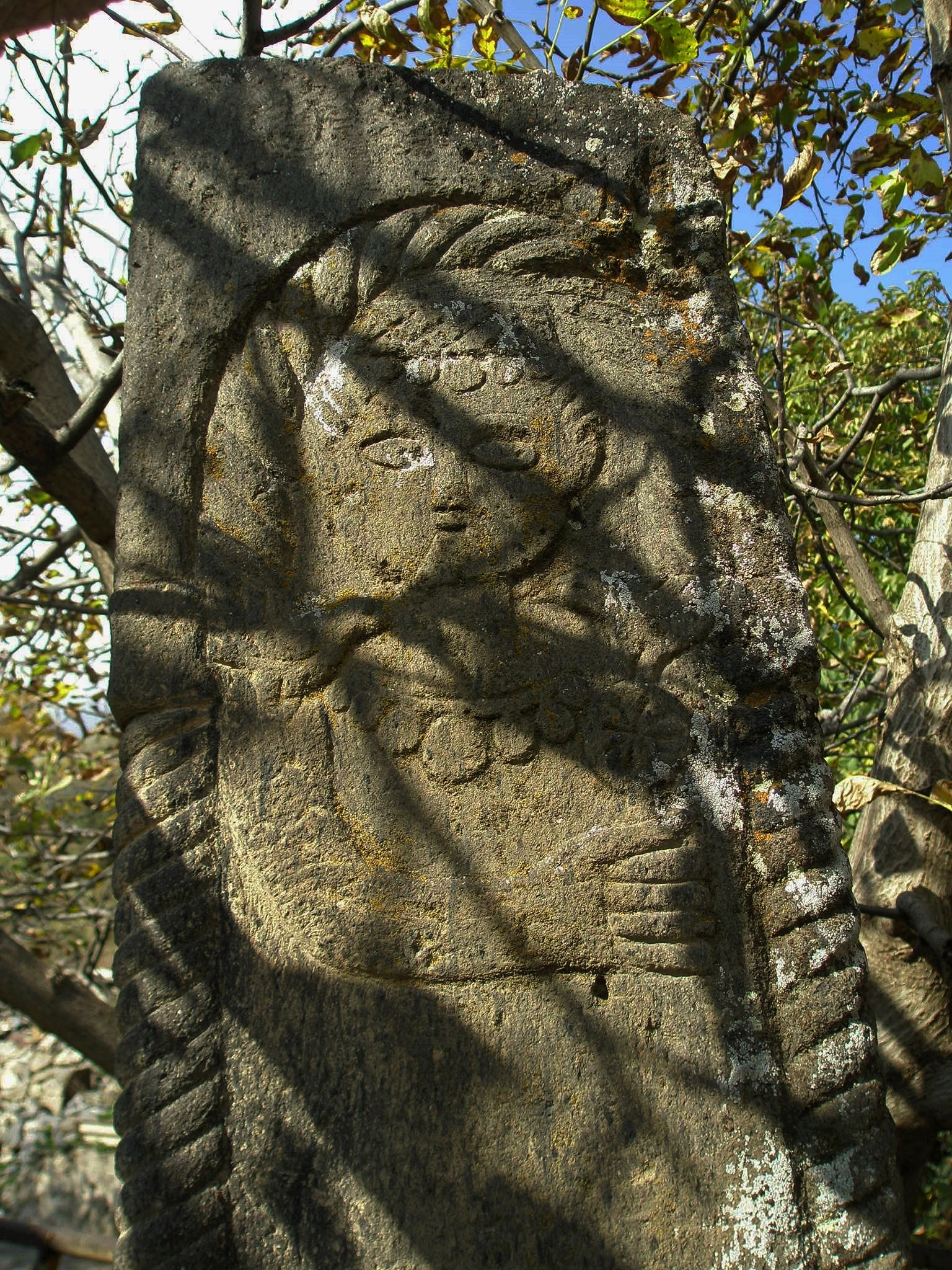
Stone pillar set on a plinth with a carving of a woman (possibly S. Astvatsatsin) adjacent to the church

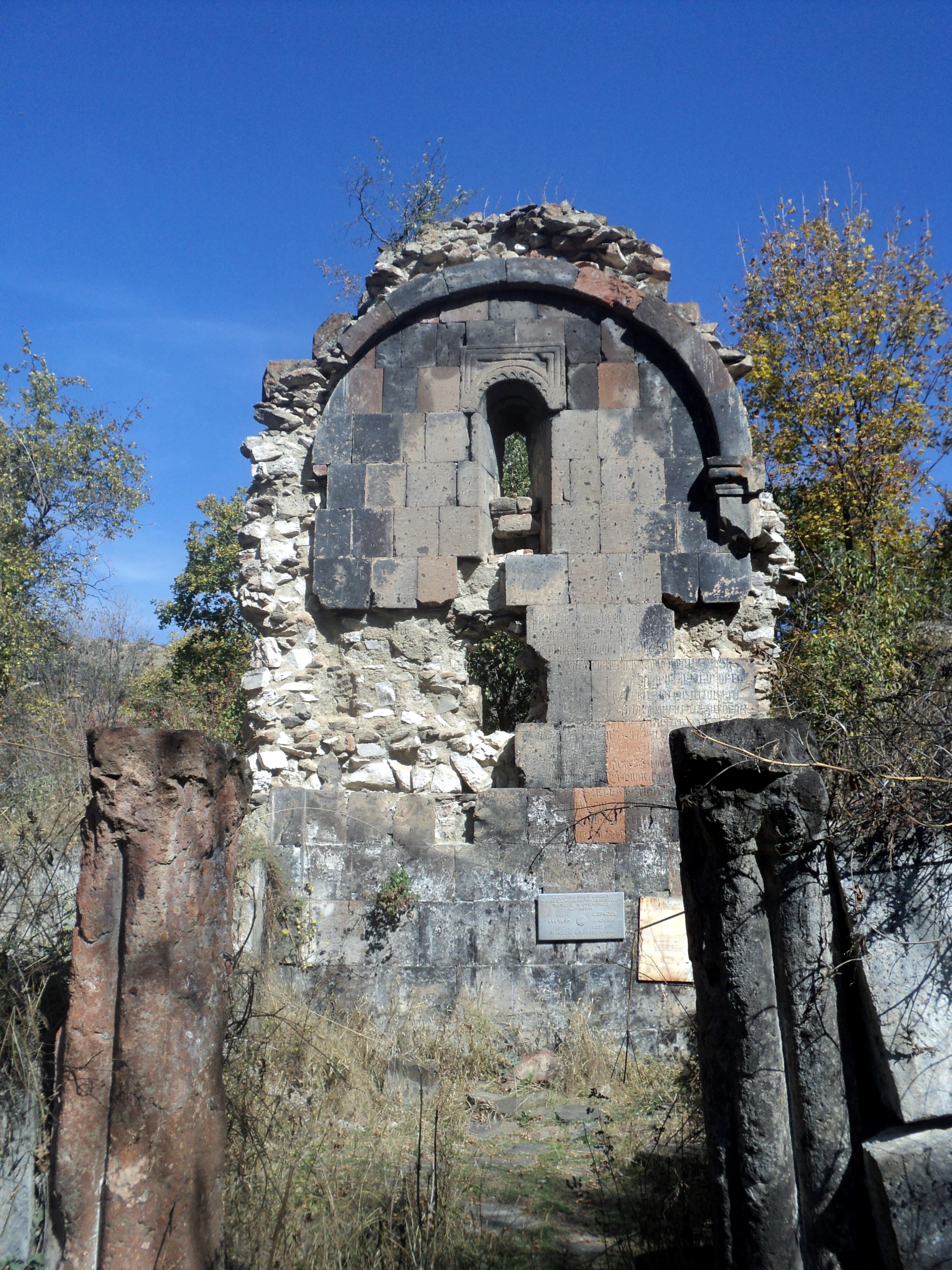
S. Astvatsatsin Church, 1207

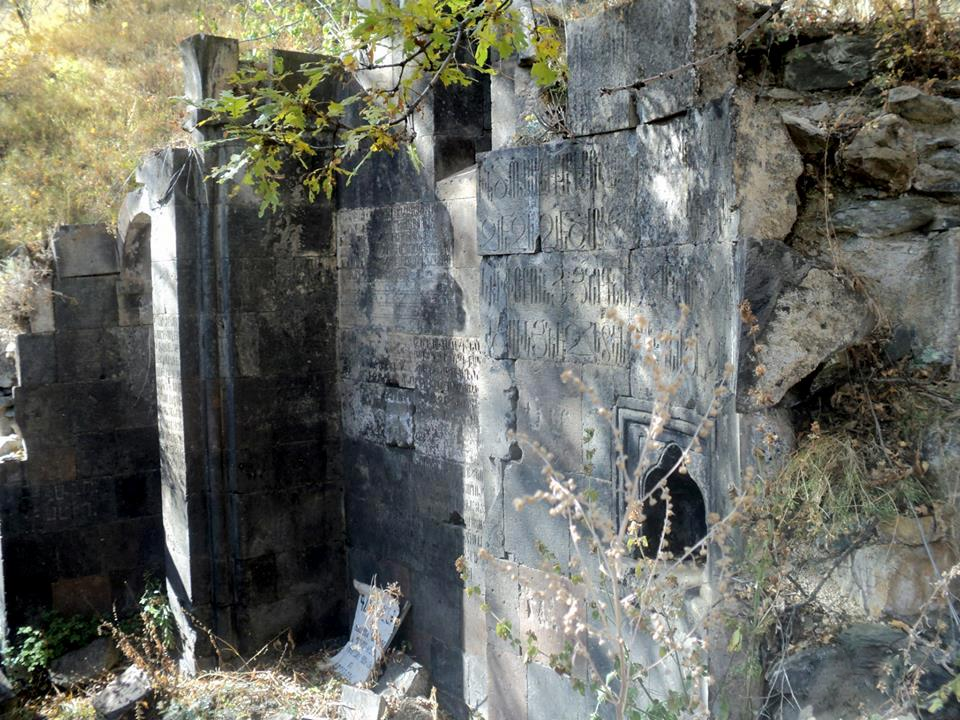
Ghuki Vank, 13th century

== See also ==
- Kotayk Province
