= Aghavnadzor, Kotayk =

Aghavnadzor Աղավնաձոր
- Village
- Location within Armenia
- Coordinates: 40°35′03″N 44°41′29″E
- Country: Armenia
- Marz (Province): Kotayk

Population (2011)
  - Total: 1,232
- Time zone: UTC+4 ( )

Aghavnadzor (Armenian: Աղավնաձոր, also romanized as Akhavnadzor and Agavnadzor) is a village in the Kotayk Province of Armenia.

== See also ==
- Kotayk Province
