= Buzhakan =

Buzhakan Բուժական
- Location within Armenia
- Coordinates: 40°27′19″N 44°31′14″E
- Country: Armenia
- Marz (Province): Kotayk
- Founded: 1829

Government
  - Mayor: Zohrak Hovhannisyan

Area
  - Total: 39.66 km^{2} (15.31 sq mi)
- Elevation: 1,820 m (5,970 ft)

Population (2024)
  - Total: 1,675
  - Density: 42.23/km^{2} (109.4/sq mi)
- Time zone: UTC+4 ( )

Buzhakan (Armenian: Բուժական), also Romanized as Bujhakan; formerly, Babakishi), is a village in the Kotayk Province of Armenia. It is situated along the eastern foothills of the Tsaghkunyats mountain range, upon a fertile slope. Early settlers of the village began immigrating to the area in 1829 from Bitlis, Artsap, Alashkert, Mush, Sasun, and Khoy. The community has a school, kindergarten, and a library. In a wooded area to the north of Buzhakan is the well-known 10th-14th century Teghenyats Monastery, and to the east of the village are the ruins of a 6th-7th century church.

== Gallery ==
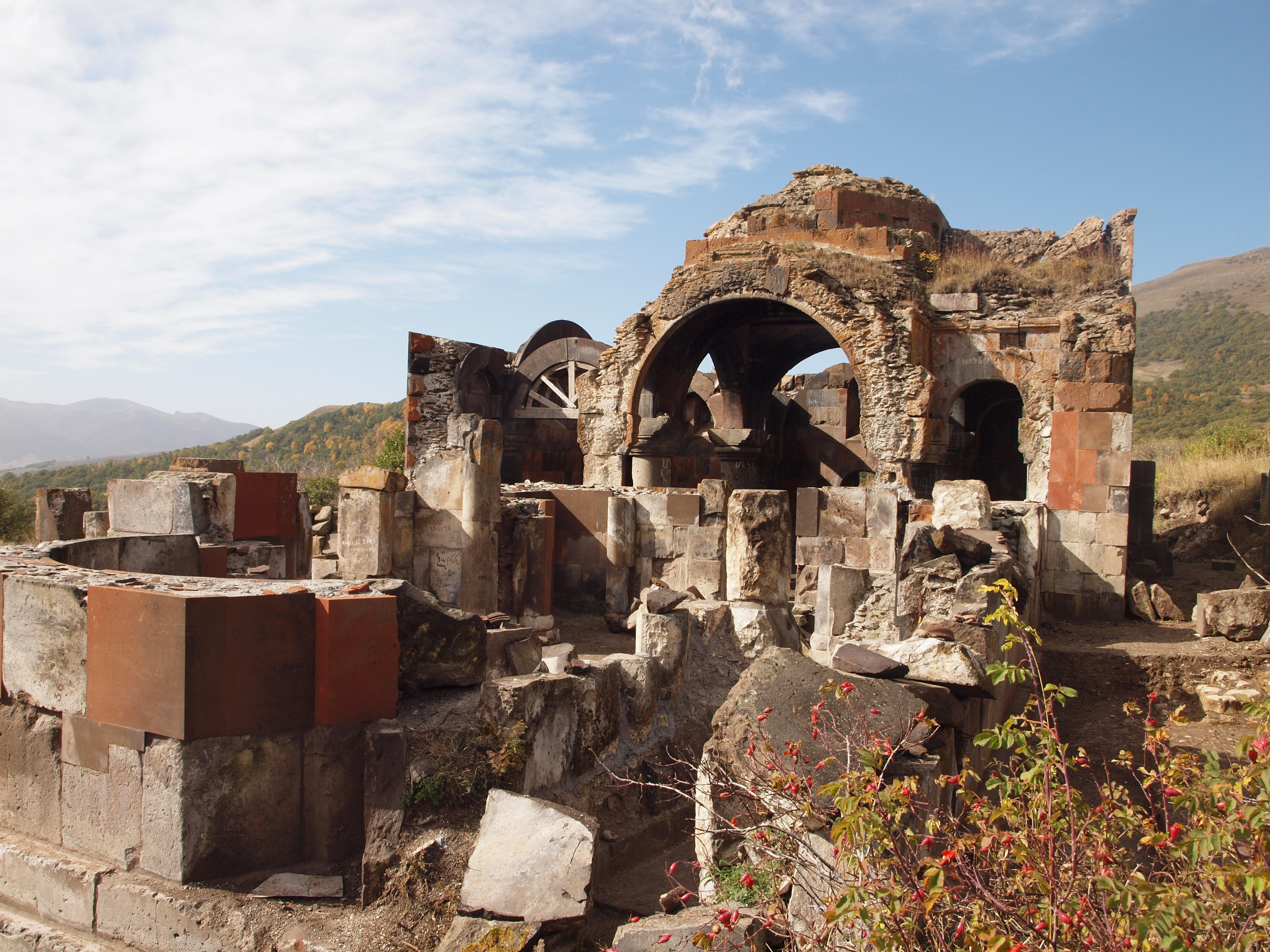
Teghenyats complex

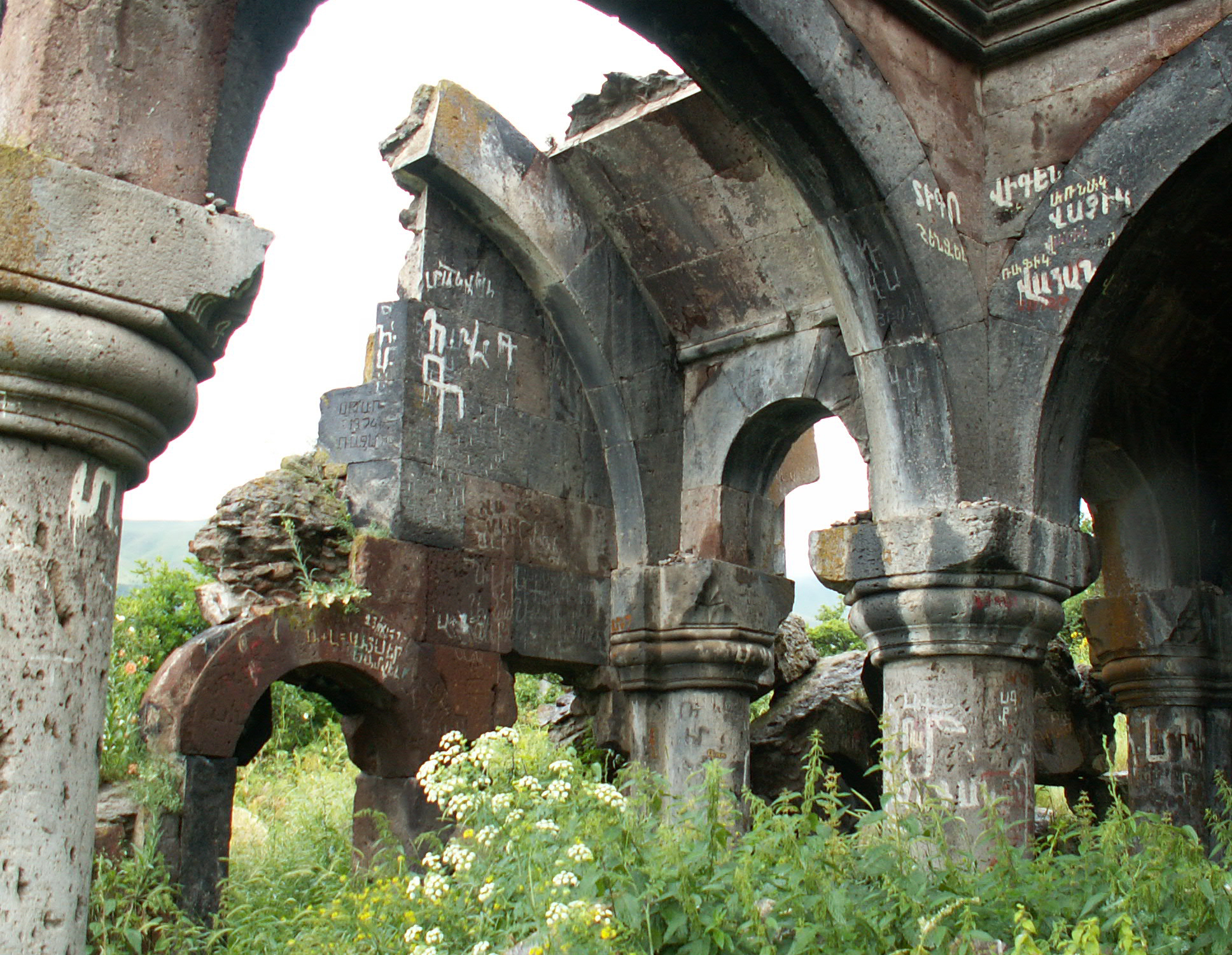
Teghenyats Monastery, 10th-14th c.

== See also ==
- Kotayk Province
