= Zovashen, Ararat =

Zovashen, Ararat may refer to:

- Zovashen (Dzhannatlu), Ararat, Armenia
- Zovashen (Keshishveran), Ararat, Armenia
