= Zovashen =

Zovashen or Zovachen may refer to:

- Zovashen (Dzhannatlu), Ararat, Armenia
- Zovashen (Keshishveran), Ararat, Armenia
- Zovashen, Kotayk, Armenia
