= Zovashen, Vedi =

Zovashen
- Location within Armenia Location within Ararat
- Coordinates: 39°49′N 45°00′E
- Country: Armenia
- Marz (Province): Ararat
- Time zone: UTC+4 ( )
  - Summer (DST): UTC+5 ( )

Zovashen (also, Keshishveran) is a town in the Ararat Province of Armenia.

== See also ==
- Ararat Province
