= Pashakend =

Pashakend may refer to:

- Atsarat, Armenia
- Marmarik, Armenia
