= Hatsarat =

- Location within Armenia Location within Gegharkunik
- Coordinates: 40°20′34″N 45°06′48″E
- Country: Armenia
- Marz (Province): Gegharkunik
- Time zone: UTC+4 ( )
  - Summer (DST): UTC+5 ( )

Hatsarat (also, Atsarat and Pashakend) is a town in the Gegharkunik Province of Armenia. The town contains a small domed church built in 898.

== See also ==
- Gegharkunik Province
