= Municipalities of Armenia =

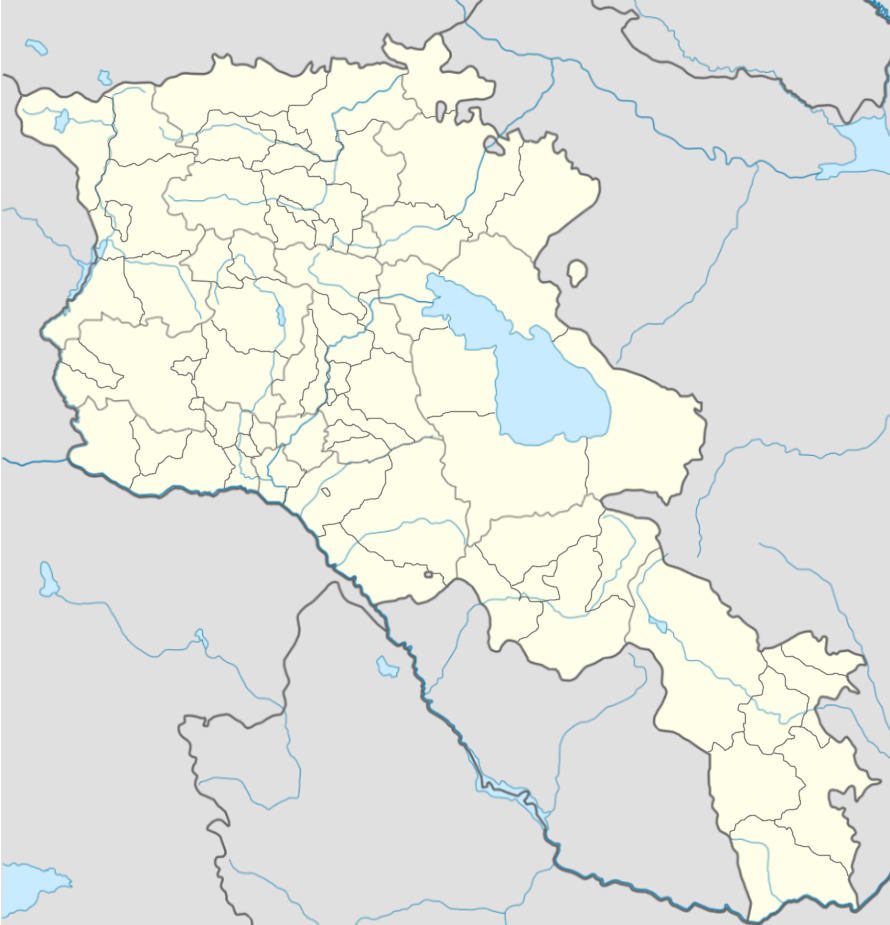
Map of all municipalities of Armenia

A municipality in Armenia referred to as community (Armenian: համայնք hamaynk, plural: Armenian: համայնքներ hamaynkner), is an administrative subdivision consisting of a settlement (Armenian: բնակավայր bnakavayr) or a group of settlements (Armenian: բնակավայրեր bnakavayrer) that enjoys local self-government. The settlements are classified as either towns (Armenian: քաղաքներ kaghakner, singular Armenian: քաղաք kaghak) or villages (Armenian: գյուղեր gyugher, singular (Armenian: գյուղ gyugh). The administrative centre of a community could either be an urban settlement (town) or a rural settlement (village).

Two-thirds of the population are now urbanized. As of 2017, 63.6% of Armenians live in urban areas as compared to 36.4% in rural. As of the end of 2017, Armenia has 503 municipal communities (including Yerevan) of which 46 are urban and 457 are rural. The capital, Yerevan, also has the status of a community.

Each municipality bears the same name as its administrative centre, apart from seven, four are located in Shirak Province (Ani Municipality with its centre Maralik, Arpi Municipality with its centre Berdasehen, Marmashen Municipality with its centre Mayisyan, Sarapat Municipality with its centre Torosgyugh), one in Gegharkunik Province (Geghamasar Municipality with its centre Sotk), one in Syunik Province (Tatev Municipality with its centre Shinuhayr), and one in Vayots Dzor Province (Yeghegis Municipality with its centre Shatin).

Here is a list of the municipalities of Armenia as of January 2018, classified by province and type:

== Aragatsotn Province ==
Aragatsotn Province is currently divided into 72 municipal communities, of which 3 are urban and 69 are rural:

Municipality	Type	Area (km^{2})	Population (2017 est.)	Centre	Included villages
Aparan Municipality	Urban			Aparan	Aragats, Arayi, Apnagyugh, Chknagh, Dzoraglukh, Hartavan, Jrambar, Kayk, Kuchak, Lusagyugh, Nigavan, Saralanj, Vardenis, Vardenut, Shenavan, Shoghakn, Tsaghkashen, Ttujur, Yernjatap, Yeghipatrush
Ashtarak Municipality	Urban	42	20,636	Ashtarak	Mughni
Talin Municipality	Urban	44	8,374	Talin	

Rural communities and included settlements:

- Agarak
- Agarakavan
- Aghdzk
- Akunk
- Alagyaz
  - Avshen
  - Charchakis
  - Jamshlu
  - Kaniashir
  - Mijnatun
  - Mirak
  - Rya Taza
  - Shenkani
  - Sipan
- Antarut
- Aragatsavan
  - Arteni
  - Getap
  - Lusakn
- Aragatsotn
- Artashavan
- Aruch
- Ashnak
- Avan
  - Khnusik
- Arevut
- Bazmaghbyur
- Byurakan
- Dashtadem
- Davtashen
- Ddmasar
- Dian
- Dprevank
- Garnahovit
- Ghazaravan
- Hako
- Hatsashen
- Irind
- Kakavadzor
- Kanch
- Karbi
- Karmrashen
- Katnaghbyur
- Kosh
- Lernarot
- Mastara
  - Dzoragyugh
- Melikgyugh
- Metsadzor
- Nerkin Bazmaberd
- Nerkin Sasnashen
- Nor Amanos
- Nor Artik
- Nor Yedesia
- Ohanavan
- Orgov
- Oshakan
- Otevan
- Parpi
- Partizak
- Saghmosavan
- Sasunik
  - Karin
- Shamiram
- Shgharshik
- Sorik
- Suser
- Tatul
- Tegher
- Tlik
- Tsaghkahovit
  - Berkarat
  - Geghadir
  - Geghadzor
  - Gegharot
  - Hnaberd
  - Lernapar
  - Norashen
  - Sadunts
  - Tsilkar
  - Vardablur
- Tsaghkasar
- Tsamakasar
- Ujan
- Ushi
- Verin Bazmaberd
- Verin Sasunik
- Verin Sasnashen
- Voskehat
- Vosketas
- Voskevaz
- Yeghnik
- Zarinja
- Zovasar

== Ararat Province ==
Ararat Province is currently divided into 95 municipal communities, of which 4 are urban and 91 are rural:

Municipality	Type	Area (km^{2})	Population (2017 est.)	Centre	Included villages
Ararat Municipality	Urban	6	20,300	Ararat	
Artashat Municipality	Urban	12	20,700	Artashat	
Masis Municipality	Urban	6	20,500	Masis	
Vedi Municipality	Urban	5.5	11,600	Vedi	

Rural communities and included settlements:

- Abovyan
- Araksavan
- Aralez
- Ararat
- Arbat
- Arevabuyr
- Argavand
- Arevshat
- Armash
- Avshar
- Aygepat
- Aygestan
- Aygavan
- Aygezard
- Ayntap
- Azatashen
- Azatavan
- Baghramyan
- Bardzrashen
- Berdik
- Berkanush
- Burastan
- Byuravan
- Dalar
- Darakert
- Darbnik
- Dashtakar
- Dashtavan
- Deghdzut
- Dimitrov
- Ditak
- Dvin
- Geghanist
- Getapnya
- Getazat
- Ghukasavan
- Ginevet
- Goravan
- Hayanist
- Hnaberd
- Hovtashat
- Hovtashen
- Jrahovit
- Jrashen
- Kaghtsrashen
- Kanachut
- Khachpar
- Lanjar
- Lanjazat
- Lusarat
- Lusashogh
- Marmarashen
- Masis
- Mkhchyan
- Mrganush
- Mrgavan
- Mrgavet
- Narek
- Nizami
- Nor Kharberd
- Nor Kyank
- Nor Kyurin
- Nor Ughi
- Norabats
- Noramarg
- Norashen
- Noyakert
- Nshavan
- Paruyr Sevak
  - Tigranashen
- Pokr Vedi
- Ranchpar
- Sayat-Nova
- Shahumyan
- Sipanik
- Sis
- Sisavan
- Surenavan
- Taperakan
- Urtsadzor
  - Lanjanist
  - Shaghap
- Urtsalanj
- Vanashen
- Vardashat
- Vardashen
- Verin Artashat
- Verin Dvin
- Vosketap
- Vostan
- Yeghegnavan
- Yeraskh
- Zangakatun
- Zorak

== Armavir Province ==
Armavir Province is currently divided into 97 municipal communities, of which 3 are urban and 94 are rural:

Municipality	Type	Area (km^{2})	Population (2017 est.)	Centre	Included villages
Armavir Municipality	Urban	6	28,900	Armavir	
Metsamor Municipality	Urban	9	9,000	Metsamor	
Vagharshapat Municipality	Urban	13	46,700	Vagharshapat	

Rural communities and included settlements:

- Aghavnatun
- Aknalich
- Aknashen
- Alashkert
- Amasia
- Amberd
- Apaga
- Aragats
- Araks (Armavir)
- Araks (Vagharshapat)
- Aratashen
- Arazap
- Arevadasht
- Arevashat
- Arevik
- Argavand
- Argina
- Armavir
- Arshaluys
- Artamet
- Artashar
- Artimet
- Aygek
- Aygeshat (Armavir)
- Aygeshat (Vagharshapat)
- Aygevan
- Bagaran
- Baghramyan (Armavir)
- Baghramyan (Vagharshapat)
- Bambakashat
- Berkashat
- Dalarik
- Dasht
- Doghs
- Ferik
- Gai
- Geghakert
- Getashen
- Griboyedov
- Hatsik
- Haykashen
- Haykavan
- Haytagh
- Hovtamej
- Hushakert
- Janfida
- Jrarat
- Jrarbi
- Jrashen
- Karakert
- Khanjyan
- Khoronk
- Koghbavan
- Lenughi
- Lernagog
- Lernamerdz
- Lukashin
- Lusagyugh
- Margara
- Mayisyan
- Merdzavan
- Metsamor
- Mrgastan
- Mrgashat
- Musaler
- Myasnikyan
- Nalbandyan
- Norakert
- Nor Armavir
- Nor Artagers
- Nor Kesaria
- Norapat
- Noravan
- Parakar
  - Tairov
- Pshatavan
- Ptghunk
- Sardarapat
- Shahumyan
- Shahumyani trchnafabrika
- Shenavan
- Shenik
- Talvorik
- Tandzut
- Taronik
- Tsaghkalanj
- Tsaghkunk
- Tsiatsan
- Vanand
- Vardanashen
- Voskehat
- Yeghegnut
- Yeraskhahun
- Yervandashat
- Zartonk

== Gegharkunik Province ==
Gegharkunik Province is currently divided into 57 municipal communities (hamaynkner), of which 5 are urban and 52 are rural.

Municipality	Type	Area (km^{2})	Population (2017 est.)	Centre	Included villages
Chambarak Municipality	Urban			Chambarak	Antaramej, Artsvashen, Aygut, Barepat, Dprabak, Dzoravank, Getik, Kalavan, Martuni, Ttujur, Vahan
Gavar Municipality	Urban	16	19,500	Gavar	
Martuni Municipality	Urban	10	12,200	Martuni	
Sevan Municipality	Urban		20,500	Sevan	Gagarin
Vardenis Municipality	Urban			Vardenis	Ayrk, Azat, Geghamabak, Jaghatsadzor, Kut, Nerkin Shorzha, Norabak, Shatjrek, Shatvan Verin Shorzha

Rural communities and included settlements:

- Akhpradzor
- Akunk
- Artsvanist
- Astghadzor
- Berdkunk
- Chkalovka
- Ddmashen
- Dzoragyugh
- Gandzak
- Geghakar
- Geghamasar Municipality, centre: Sotk
  - Areguni
  - Arpunk
  - Avazan
  - Azat
  - Daranak
  - Geghamabak
  - Geghamasar
  - Jaghatsadzor
  - Kakhakn
  - Kut
  - Kutakan
  - Norabak
  - Pambak
  - Pokr Masrik
  - Shatjrek
  - Shatvan
  - Tretuk
- Geghamavan
- Gegharkunik
- Geghhovit
  - Lernahovit
- Hayravank
- Karchaghbyur
- Karmirgyugh
- Khachaghbyur
- Lanjaghbyur
- Lchap
- Lchashen
- Lchavan
- Lichk
- Lusakunk
- Madina
- Makenis
- Mets Masrik
- Nerkin Getashen
- Norakert
- Norashen
- Noratus
- Sarukhan
- Semyonovka
- Shoghakat
  - Aghberk
  - Artanish
  - Drakhtik
  - Jil
  - Tsapatagh
- Torfavan
- Tsaghkashen
- Tsaghkunk
- Tsakkar
- Tsovagyugh
- Tsovasar
- Tsovazard
- Tsovak
- Tsovinar
- Vaghashen
- Vanevan
- Vardadzor
- Vardenik
- Varser
- Verin Getashen
- Yeranos
- Zolakar
- Zovaber

== Kotayk Province ==
Kotayk Province is currently divided into 42 municipal communities, of which 7 are urban and 35 are rural:

Municipality	Type	Area (km^{2})	Population (2017 est.)	Centre	Included villages
Abovyan Municipality	Urban	11	58,828	Abovyan	
Byureghavan Municipality	Urban	36	12,957	Byureghavan	Jraber, Nurnus
Charentsavan Municipality	Urban	245	39,403	Charentsavan	Alapars, Aghveran, Arzakan, Bjni, Fantan, Karenis
Hrazdan Municipality	Urban	15	58,406	Hrazdan	
Nor Hachn Municipality	Urban	1	11,748	Nor Hachn	
Tsaghkadzor Municipality	Urban	4	1,491	Tsaghkadzor	
Yeghvard Municipality	Urban	206	25,667	Yeghvard	Aragyugh, Buzhakan, Saralanj, Zoravan, Zovuni
Akunk Municipality	Rural			Akunk	Hatis, Kaputan, Kotayk, Nor Gyugh, Sevaberd, Zar, Zovashen
Aramus Municipality	Rural			Aramus	
Arinj Municipality	Rural			Arinj	
Arzni Municipality	Rural			Arzni	
Argel Municipality	Rural			Argel	
Balahovit Municipality	Rural			Balahovit	
Garni Municipality	Rural			Garni	
Geghadir Municipality	Rural			Geghadir	
Geghard Municipality	Rural			Geghard	
Geghashen Municipality	Rural			Geghashen	
Goght Municipality	Rural			Goght	
Getamej Municipality	Rural			Getamej	
Getargel Municipality	Rural			Getargel	
Hatsavan Municipality	Rural			Hatsavan	
Jrarat Municipality	Rural			Jrarat	
Jrvezh Municipality	Rural			Jrvezh	Dzoraghbyur, Zovk
Kaghsi Municipality	Rural			Kaghsi	
Kamaris Municipality	Rural			Kamaris	
Kanakeravan Municipality	Rural			Kanakeravan	
Karashamb Municipality	Rural			Karashamb	
Kasagh Municipality	Rural			Kasagh	
Katnaghbyur Municipality	Rural			Katnaghbyur	
Lernanist Municipality	Rural			Lernanist	
Mayakovski Municipality	Rural			Mayakovski	
Meghradzor Municipality	Rural			Meghradzor	Aghavnadzor, Artavaz, Gorgoch, Hankavan, Marmarik, Pyunik
Mrgashen Municipality	Rural			Mrgashen	
Nor Artamet Municipality	Rural			Nor Artamet	
Nor Geghi Municipality	Rural			Nor Geghi	
Nor Yerznka Municipality	Rural			Nor Yerznka	
Proshyan Municipality	Rural			Proshyan	
Ptghni Municipality	Rural			Ptghni	
Solak Municipality	Rural			Solak	
Teghenik Municipality	Rural			Teghenik	
Verin Ptghni Municipality	Rural			Verin Ptghni	
Voghjaberd Municipality	Rural			Voghjaberd	

== Lori Province ==
Lori Province is currently divided into 57 municipal communities, of which 7 are urban and 50 are rural:

Municipality	Type	Area (km^{2})	Population (2017 est.)	Centre	Included villages
Akhtala Municipality	Urban			Akhtala	Akhtala aroghjaranin kits, Bendik, Chochkan, Mets Ayrum, Neghots, Pokr Ayrum, Shamlugh, Verin Akhtala
Alaverdi Municipality	Urban			Alaverdi	Akner, Akori, Jiliza, Kachachkut, Haghpat, Tsaghkashat
Spitak Municipality	Urban	5.5	13,000	Spitak	
Stepanavan Municipality	Urban	14	12,800	Stepanavan	Armanis, Katnaghbyur, Urasar
Tashir Municipality	Urban			Tashir	Blagodarnoye, Dashtadem, Getavan, Katnarat, Kruglaya Shishka, Lernahovit, Medovka, Meghvahovit, Noramut, Novoseltsovo, Saratovka
Tumanyan Municipality	Urban			Tumanyan	Kober kayaran, Shamut, Lorut, Ahnidzor, Atan, Marts, Karinj
Vanadzor Municipality	Urban	32	82,200	Vanadzor	
Antaramut Municipality	Rural			Antaramut	
Antarashen Municipality	Rural			Antarashen	
Arevashogh Municipality	Rural			Arevashogh	
Arjut Municipality	Rural			Arjut	Arjut kayaranin kits
Aznvadzor Municipality	Rural			Aznvadzor	
Bazum Municipality	Rural			Bazum	
Chkalov Municipality	Rural			Chkalov	
Darpas Municipality	Rural			Darpas	
Debet Municipality	Rural			Debet	
Dsegh Municipality	Rural			Dsegh	
Dzoraget Municipality	Rural			Dzoraget	
Dzoragyugh Municipality	Rural			Dzoragyugh	
Fioletovo Municipality	Rural			Fioletovo	
Geghasar Municipality	Rural			Geghasar	
Ghursali Municipality	Rural			Ghursali	
Gogaran Municipality	Rural			Gogaran	
Gugark Municipality	Rural			Gugark	
Gyulagarak Municipality	Rural			Gyulagarak	Amrakits, Gargar, Hobardzi, Kurtan, Pushkino, Vardablur
Halavar Municipality	Rural			Halavar	Haydarli, Kilisa
Hartagyugh Municipality	Rural			Hartagyugh	
Jrashen Municipality	Rural			Jrashen	
Karaberd Municipality	Rural			Karaberd	
Karadzor Municipality	Rural			Karadzor	
Katnajur Municipality	Rural			Katnajur	
Khnkoyan Municipality	Rural			Khnkoyan	
Lermontovo Municipality	Rural			Lermontovo	
Lernantsk Municipality	Rural			Lernantsk	
Lernapat Municipality	Rural			Lernapat	
Lernavan Municipality	Rural			Lernavan	
Lori Berd Municipality	Rural			Lori Berd	Agarak, Bovadzor, Hovnanadzor, Koghes, Lejan, Sverdlov, Urut, Yaghdan
Lusaghbyur Municipality	Rural			Lusaghbyur	
Margahovit Municipality	Rural			Margahovit	
Mets Parni Municipality	Rural			Mets Parni	
Metsavan Municipality	Rural			Metsavan	Dzyunashogh, Mikhayelovka, Paghaghbyur
Nor Khachakap Municipality	Rural			Nor Khachakap	
Norashen Municipality	Rural			Norashen	
Odzun Municipality	Rural			Odzun	Amoj, Ardvi, Arevatsag, Aygehat, Hagvi, Karmir Aghek, Mghart, Tsater
Pambak Municipality	Rural			Pambak	Pambak kayaranin kits
Sarahart Municipality	Rural			Sarahart	
Saralanj Municipality	Rural			Saralanj	
Saramej Municipality	Rural			Saramej	
Sarchapet Municipality	Rural			Sarchapet	Apaven, Artsni, Dzoramut, Gogavan, Petrovka, Privolnoye
Shahumyan Municipality	Rural			Shahumyan	
Shenavan Municipality	Rural			Shenavan	
Shirakamut Municipality	Rural			Shirakamut	
Shnogh Municipality	Rural			Shnogh	Karkop, Teghut
Tsaghkaber Municipality	Rural			Tsaghkaber	
Vahagnadzor Municipality	Rural			Vahagnadzor	
Vahagni Municipality	Rural			Vahagni	
Yeghegnut Municipality	Rural			Yeghegnut	

== Shirak Province ==
Shirak Province is currently divided into 42 municipal communities, of which 3 are urban and 39 are rural:

Municipality	Type	Area (km^{2})	Population (2017 est.)	Centre	Included villages
Artik Municipality	Urban			Artik	
Gyumri Municipality	Urban			Gyumri	
Ani Municipality	Urban			Maralik	Aniavan, Aghin, Aghin kayaran, Anipemza, Bagravan, Bardzrashen, Dzithankov, Dzorakap, Gusanagyugh, Haykadzor, Isahakyan, Jrapi, Karaberd, Norshen, Lanjik, Lusaghbyur, Sarakap, Sarnaghbyur, Shirakavan
Akhurik Municipality	Rural			Akhurik	
Akhuryan Municipality	Rural			Akhuryan	Arevik, Aygebats, Basen, Hovit, Jrarat, Kamo, Karnut
Amasia Municipality	Rural			Amasia	Aregnadem, Bandivan, Byurakn, Gtashen, Hovtun, Jradzor, Kamkhut, Meghrashat, Voghji
Anushavan Municipality	Rural			Anushavan	
Arevshat Municipality	Rural			Arevshat	
Arapi Municipality	Rural			Arapi	
Arpi Municipality	Rural	218	1,831	Berdashen	Alvar, Aghvorik, Ardenis, Darik, Garnarich, Paghakn, Shaghik, Tsaghkut, Yeghnajur, Zarishat, Zorakert
Ashotsk Municipality	Rural			Ashotsk	Bavra, Ghazanchi, Karmravan, Krasar, Mets Sepasar, Pokr Sepasar, Saragyugh, Sizavet, Tavshut, Zuygaghbyur
Azatan Municipality	Rural			Azatan	
Bayandur Municipality	Rural			Bayandur	
Beniamin Municipality	Rural			Beniamin	
Geghanist Municipality	Rural			Geghanist	
Getk Municipality	Rural			Getk	
Getap Municipality	Rural			Getap	
Gharibjanyan Municipality	Rural			Gharibjanyan	
Harich Municipality	Rural			Harich	Hatsikavan
Haykasar Municipality	Rural			Haykasar	
Haykavan Municipality	Rural			Haykavan	
Hayrenyats Municipality	Rural			Hayrenyats	
Horom Municipality	Rural			Horom	
Hovtashen Municipality	Rural			Hovtashen	
Lernakert Municipality	Rural			Lernakert	
Lusakert Municipality	Rural			Lusakert	
Marmashen Municipality	Rural			Mayisyan	Hatsik, Hovuni, Jajur, Jajuravan, Kaps, Karmrakar, Keti, Krashen, Lernut, Marmashen, Mets Sariar, Pokrashen, Shirak, Vahramaberd
Meghrashen Municipality	Rural			Meghrashen	
Mets Mantash Municipality	Rural			Mets Mantash	
Nahapetavan Municipality	Rural			Nahapetavan	
Nor Kyank Municipality	Rural			Nor Kyank	
Panik Municipality	Rural			Panik	
Pemzashen Municipality	Rural			Pemzashen	
Pokr Mantash Municipality	Rural			Pokr Mantash	
Saralanj Municipality	Rural			Saralanj	
Saratak Municipality	Rural			Saratak	
Spandaryan Municipality	Rural			Spandaryan	
Sarapat Municipality	Rural			Torosgyugh	Arpeni, Bashgyugh, Dzorashen, Goghovit, Hartashen, Hoghmik, Kakavasar, Lernagyugh, Musayelyan, Pokr Sariar, Salut, Sarapat, Tsoghamarg, Vardaghbyur
Tufashen Municipality	Rural			Tufashen	
Vardakar Municipality	Rural			Vardakar	
Voskehask Municipality	Rural			Voskehask	
Yerazgavors Municipality	Rural			Yerazgavors	

== Syunik Province ==
Syunik Province is currently divided into 8 municipal communities, of which 5 are urban, and 3 are rural:

Municipality	Type	Area (km^{2})	Population (2011 census)	Centre	Included villages
Goris Municipality	Urban		29,173	Goris	Akner, Bardzravan, Hartashen, Karahunj, Khndzoresk, Nerkin Khndzoresk, Shurnukh, Verishen, Vorotan. (Abandoned: Aghbulagh, Dzorak, Vanand).
Kajaran Municipality	Urban		9,134	Kajaran	Ajabaj, Andokavan, Babikavan, Dzagikavan, Geghi, Getishen, Kajarants, Katnarat, Kavchut, Lernadzor, Nor Astghaberd, Pkhrut. (Abandoned: Geghavank, Kard, Karut, Kitsk, Nerkin Giratagh, Verin Giratagh, Verin Geghavank, Vocheti).
Kapan Municipality	Urban		49,788	Kapan	Agarak, Atchanan, Aghvani, Antarashat, Arajadzor, Artsvanik, Bargushat, Chakaten, Chapni, Davit Bek, Ditsmayri, Dzorastan, Geghanush, Gomaran, Kaghnut, Khdrants, Khordzor, Nerkin Hand, Nerkin Khotanan, Norashenik, Okhtar, Sevakar, Shikahogh, Shishkert, Shrvenants, Srashen, Syunik, Sznak, Tandzaver, Tavrus, Tsav, Uzhanis, Vanek, Vardavank, Verin Khotanan, Yegheg, Yeghvard.
Meghri Municipality	Urban		11,377	Meghri	Agarak, Alvank, Aygedzor, Gudemnis, Karchevan, Kuris, Lehvaz, Lichk, Nrnadzor, Shvanidzor, Tashtun, Tkhkut, Vahravar, Vardanidzor.
Sisian Municipality	Urban		28,563	Sisian	Aghitu, Akhlatyan, Angeghakot, Arevis, Ashotavan, Balak, Bnunis, Brnakot, Darbas, Dastakert, Getatagh, Hatsavan, Ishkhanasar, Ltsen, Lor, Mutsk, Noravan, Nzhdeh, Shaki, Salvard, Shaghat, Shamb, Shenatagh, Tanahat, Tasik, Tolors, Torunik, Tsghuni, Uyts, Vaghatin, Vorotnavan.
Gorayk Municipality	Rural		1,702	Gorayk	Sarnakunk, Spandaryan, Tsghuk.
Tatev Municipality	Rural		6,260	Shinuhayr	Halidzor, Harzhis, Kashuni, Khot, Svarants, Tandzatap, Tatev.
Tegh Municipality	Rural		5,994	Tegh	Aravus, Karashen, Khnatsakh, Khoznavar, Kornidzor, Vaghatur.

== Tavush Province ==
Tavush Province is currently divided into 24 municipal communities, of which 5 are urban, and 19 are rural:

Municipality	Type	Area (km^{2})	Population (2017 est.)	Centre	Included villages
Ayrum Municipality	Urban	77	11,097	Ayrum	Archis, Bagratashen, Debetavan, Deghdzavan, Haghtanak, Lchkadzor, Ptghavan
Berd Municipality	Urban			Berd	Aygedzor, Aygepar, Artsvaberd, Chinari, Chinchin, Choratan, Itsakar, Movses, Navur, Nerkin Karmiraghbyur, Norashen, Paravakar, Tavush, Varagavan, Verin Karmiraghbyur, Verin Tsaghkavan
Dilijan Municipality	Urban			Dilijan	Aghavnavank, Gosh, Haghartsin, Hovk, Teghut, Khachardzan
Ijevan Municipality	Urban	43	18,960	Ijevan	
Noyemberyan Municipality	Urban	154.5	16,782	Noyemberyan	Baghanis, Barekamavan, Berdavan, Dovegh, Jujevan, Koti, Voskepar, Voskevan
Achajur Municipality	Rural	30	4,463	Achajur	
Acharkut Municipality	Rural	0.2	177	Acharkut	
Aknaghbyur Municipality	Rural	6	521	Aknaghbyur	
Aygehovit Municipality	Rural	21	3,591	Aygehovit	Kayan
Azatamut Municipality	Rural	0.5	3182	Azatamut	
Berkaber Municipality	Rural	12	552	Berkaber	
Ditavan Municipality	Rural	8	391	Ditavan	
Gandzakar Municipality	Rural	34	3,639	Gandzakar	
Getahovit Municipality	Rural	8.5	2,265	Getahovit	
Khashtarak Municipality	Rural	18.5	1869	Khashtarak	
Kirants Municipality	Rural	6	392	Kirants	
Koghb Municipality	Rural	67	5,970	Koghb	Zorakan
Lusadzor Municipality	Rural	6.5	686	Lusadzor	
Lusahovit Municipality	Rural	5	333	Lusahovit	
Nerkin Tsaghkavan Municipality	Rural	9	618	Nerkin Tsaghkavan	
Sarigyugh Municipality	Rural	14	1,359	Sarigyugh	
Sevkar Municipality	Rural	47	2,307	Sevkar	
Vazashen Municipality	Rural	17	887	Vazashen	
Yenokavan Municipality	Rural	15.5	537	Yenokavan	

== Vayots Dzor Province ==
Vayots Dzor Province is currently divided into 8 municipal communities (hamaynkner), of which 3 are urban, and 5 are rural:

Municipality	Type	Area (km^{2})	Population (2011 census)	Centre	Included villages
Jermuk Municipality	Urban	497	7,359	Jermuk	Gndevaz, Herher, Karmrashen.
Vayk Municipality	Urban	184	7,064	Vayk	Arin, Azatek, Por, Zedea.
Yeghegnadzor Municipality	Urban	27	7,944	Yeghegnadzor	
Areni Municipality	Rural	438	10,410	Areni	Agarakadzor, Aghavnadzor, Arpi, Chiva, Gnishik, Khachik, Mozrov, Rind, Yelpin. (Abandoned: Amaghu).
Gladzor Municipality	Rural	131	5,220	Gladzor	Getap, Vernashen.
Malishka Municipality	Rural	86	4,460	Malishka	
Yeghegis Municipality	Rural	477	5,961	Shatin	Aghnjadzor, Artabuynk, Goghtanik, Hermon, Horbategh, Hors, Karaglukh, Salli, Sevazhayr, Taratumb, Vardahovit, Yeghegis. (Abandoned: Arates, Getikvank, Kalasar)
Zaritap Municipality	Rural	468	3,906	Zaritap	Artavan, Bardzruni, Gomk, Kapuyt, Khndzorut, Martiros, Nor Aznaberd, Saravan, Sers, Ughedzor. (Abandoned: Akhta, Horadis).

== Yerevan ==
The capital Yerevan holds the status of a single municipal community divided into 12 administrative districts:

Municipality	Type	Area (km^{2})	Population (2017 est.)	Centre	Included villages
Yerevan Municipality	Urban	223	1,060,138	Yerevan	—N/a

Sources: Armenia 2011 census
