= Sariar =

Sariar may refer to:

- Apaven, Armenia
- Mets Sariar, Armenia
- Pokr Sariar, Armenia
