= Makhta =

Makhta may refer to:

- Lernarot, Armenia
- Maxta, Azerbaijan
