= Kolageran =

Kolageran may refer to:

- Antarramut, Armenia
- Dzoraget, Armenia
