= Haykavan =

Haykavan or Haikavan or Aykavan may refer to:

- Haykavan, Armavir, Armenia
- Haykavan, Shirak, Armenia
