= Isahakyan =

Village in Shirak, Armenia

Isahakyan Իսահակյան
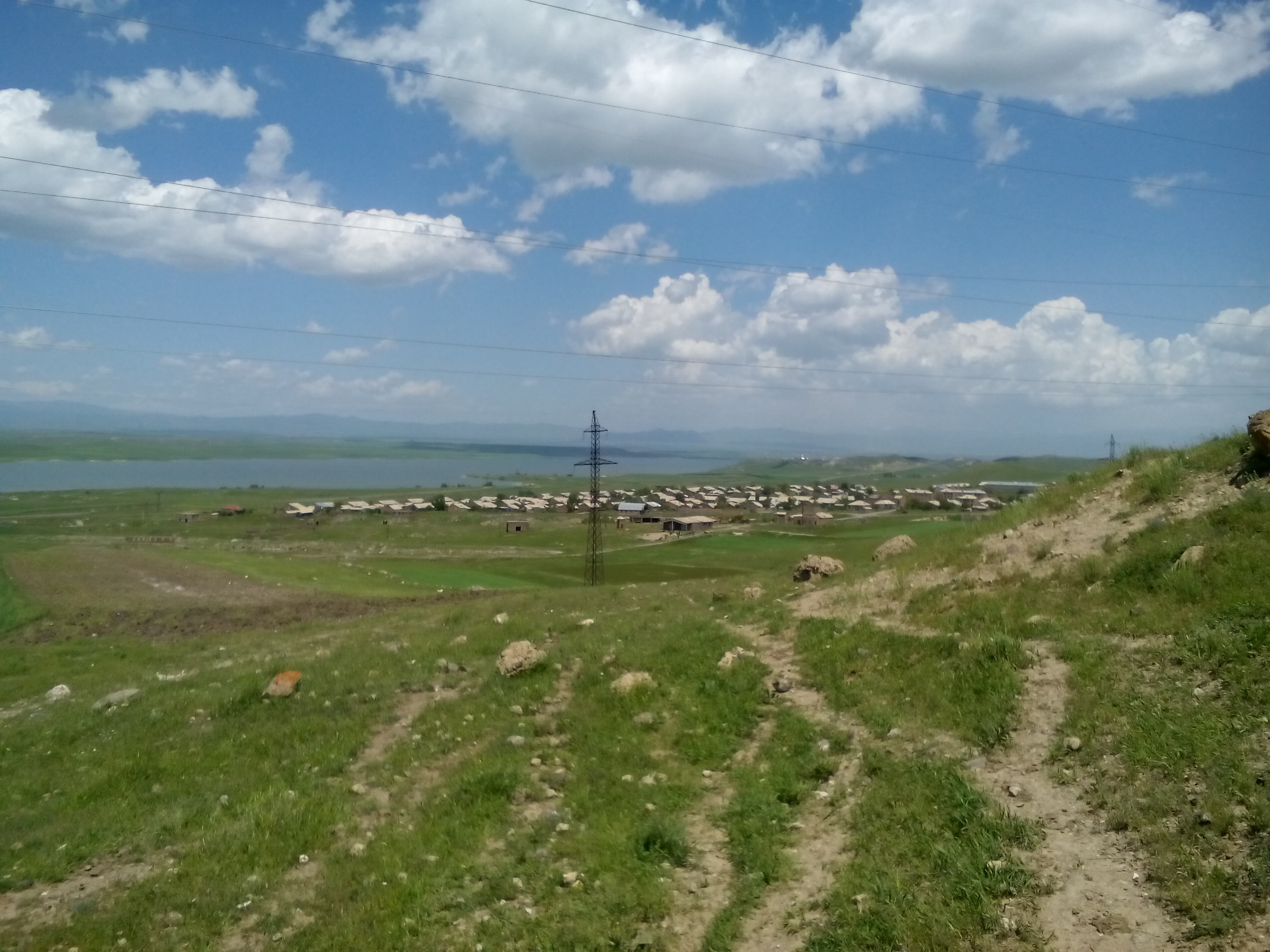

- Location within Armenia Location within Shirak
- Coordinates: 40°37′00″N 43°43′31″E
- Country: Armenia
- Province: Shirak
- Municipality: Ani

Population (2011)
  - Total: 824
- Time zone: UTC+4

Isahakyan (Armenian: Իսահակյան) is a village in the Ani Municipality of the Shirak Province of Armenia. It was formerly named after Ghazar Agha who organized the defense of the town against the Persians in 1826–1828; later named after poet Avetik Isahakyan, who lived there.

== Demographics ==
Historical population
Year	Pop.	±% p.a.
1831	325	—
1897	596	+0.92%
1926	451	−0.96%
1939	596	+2.17%
1959	588	−0.07%
1970	502	−1.43%
1979	532	+0.65%
2001	960	+2.72%
2011	824	−1.52%
