= Aghvani =

Aghvani Աղվանի
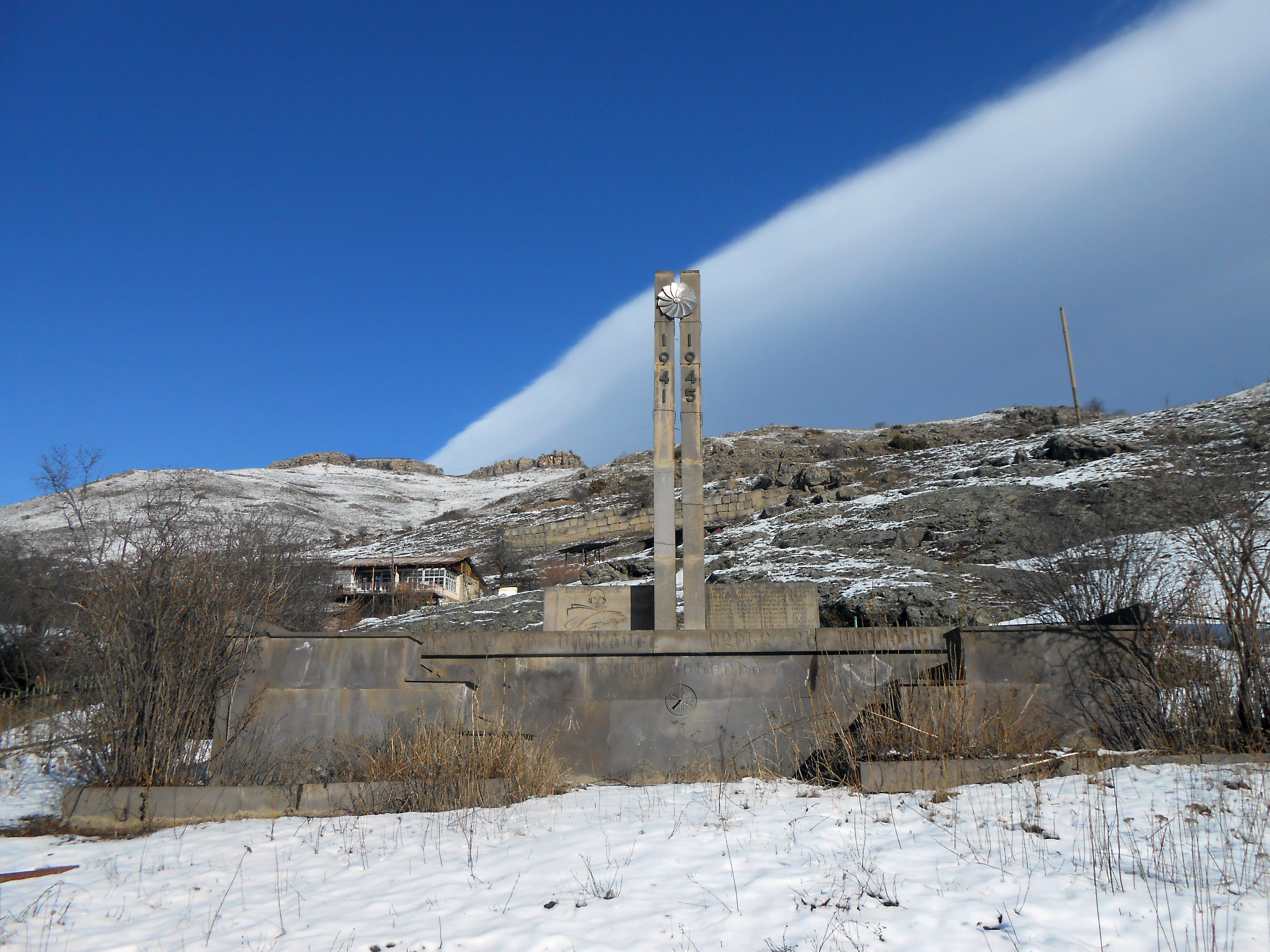
- WWII monument in Aghavni

- Location within Armenia Location within Syunik Province
- Coordinates: 39°21′18″N 46°18′11″E
- Country: Armenia
- Province: Syunik
- Municipality: Kapan

Area
  - Total: 9.92 km^{2} (3.83 sq mi)

Population (2011)
  - Total: 98
  - Density: 9.9/km^{2} (26/sq mi)
- Time zone: UTC+4 (AMT)

Aghvani (Armenian: Աղվանի) is a village in the Kapan Municipality of the Syunik Province in Armenia.

== Etymology ==
The village was previously known as Khoghvani.

== Demographics ==
The Statistical Committee of Armenia reported Agarak's population as 88 in 2010, down from 138 at the 2001 census.
