= Gladzor Community =

Gladzor Գլաձոր
- Rural Community
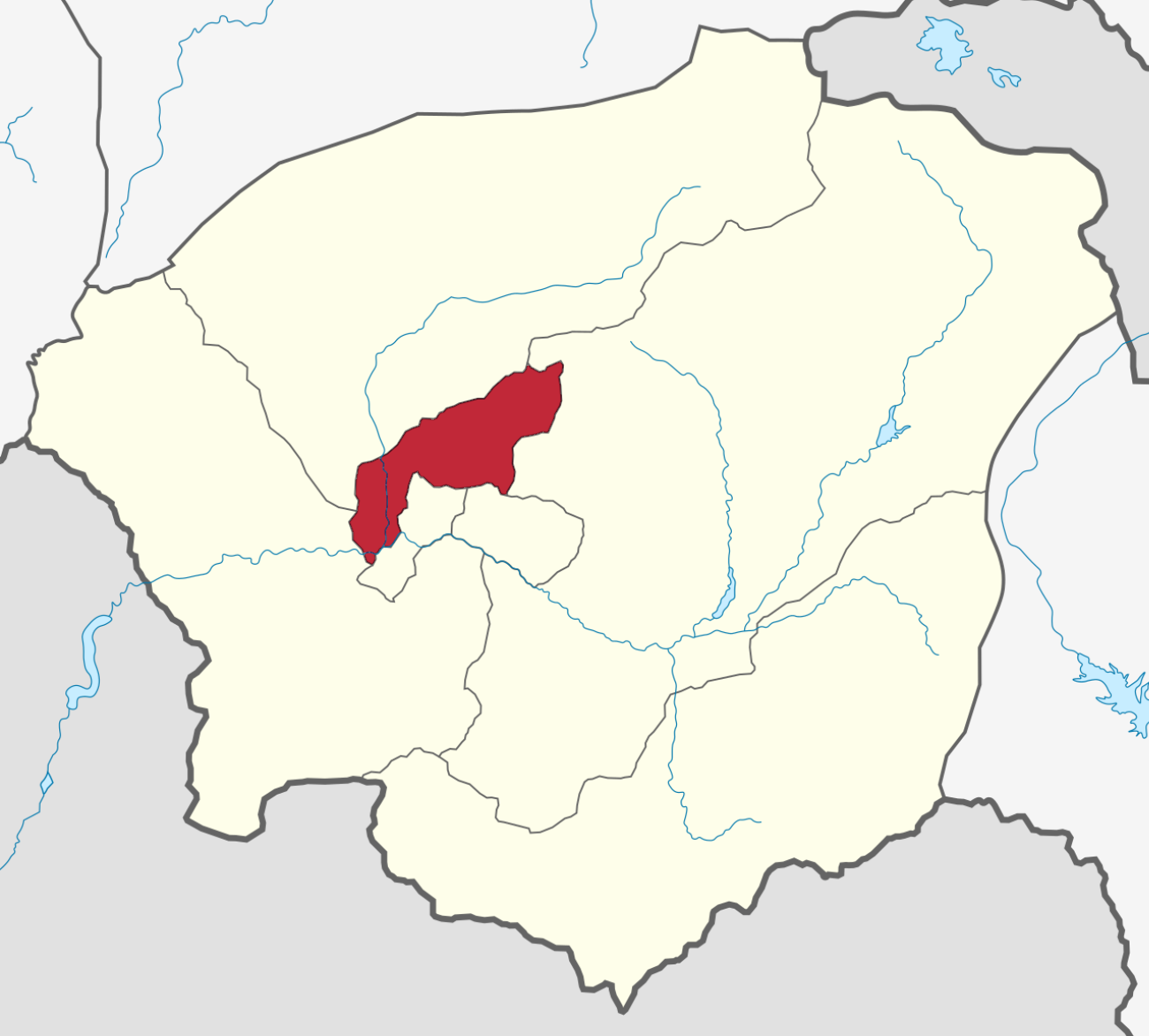
- Coordinates: 39°47′N 45°21′E
- Country: Armenia
- Province: Vayots Dzor
- Formed: 2017-2022
- Administrative centre: Gladzor

Government
  - Mayor: Armen Movsisyan

Area
  - Total: 131 km^{2} (51 sq mi)

Population (2011 census)
  - Total: 5,220
  - Density: 39.8/km^{2} (103/sq mi)
- Time zone: AMT (UTC+04)
- Postal code: 3601–3810
- ISO 3166 code: AM-VD
- FIPS 10-4: AM10

Gladzor Municipality, referred to as Gladzor Community (Armenian: Գլաձոր Համայնք Gladzor Hamaynk), was a rural community and administrative subdivision of Vayots Dzor Province of Armenia, at the southeast of the country. Consisted of a group of settlements, its administrative centre was the village of Gladzor. Since 2022 it has been incorporated into Yeghegnadzor Municipality.

== Included settlements ==
Settlement	Type	Population (2011 census)
Gladzor	Village, administrative centre	2,126
Getap	Village	1,981
Vernashen	Village	1,113

== See also ==
- Vayots Dzor Province
