= Vardakar =

Village in Shirak, Armenia

Vardakar Վարդաքար
- Location within Armenia Location within Shirak
- Coordinates: 40°40′N 43°55′E
- Country: Armenia
- Province: Shirak
- Municipality: Artik

Population (2011)
  - Total: 709
- Time zone: UTC+4
  - Summer (DST): UTC+5

Vardakar (Armenian: Վարդաքար) is a village in the Artik Municipality of the Shirak Province of Armenia.

== Demographics ==
The population of the village since 1831 is as follows:

Historical population
Year	Pop.	±% p.a.
1831	201	—
1897	723	+1.96%
1926	829	+0.47%
1939	789	−0.38%
1959	673	−0.79%
1979	768	+0.66%
1979	612	−100.00%
1989	831	+3.11%
2001	646	−2.08%
2011	709	+0.93%

== Development programs ==
Vardakar village became part of COAF-supported villages (Children of Armenia Fund) in 2016. Children of Armenia Fund also renovated village facilities such as Cafeteria and Brushodrome.

The programs implemented include: Debate Clubs, Health and Lifestyle Education, School Nutrition & Brushodromes, Women Health Screenings, Support for Reproductive Health.

== See also ==
- Shirak province
- Children of Armenia Fund
