= Zovaber, Gegharkunik =

Zovaber Զովաբեր
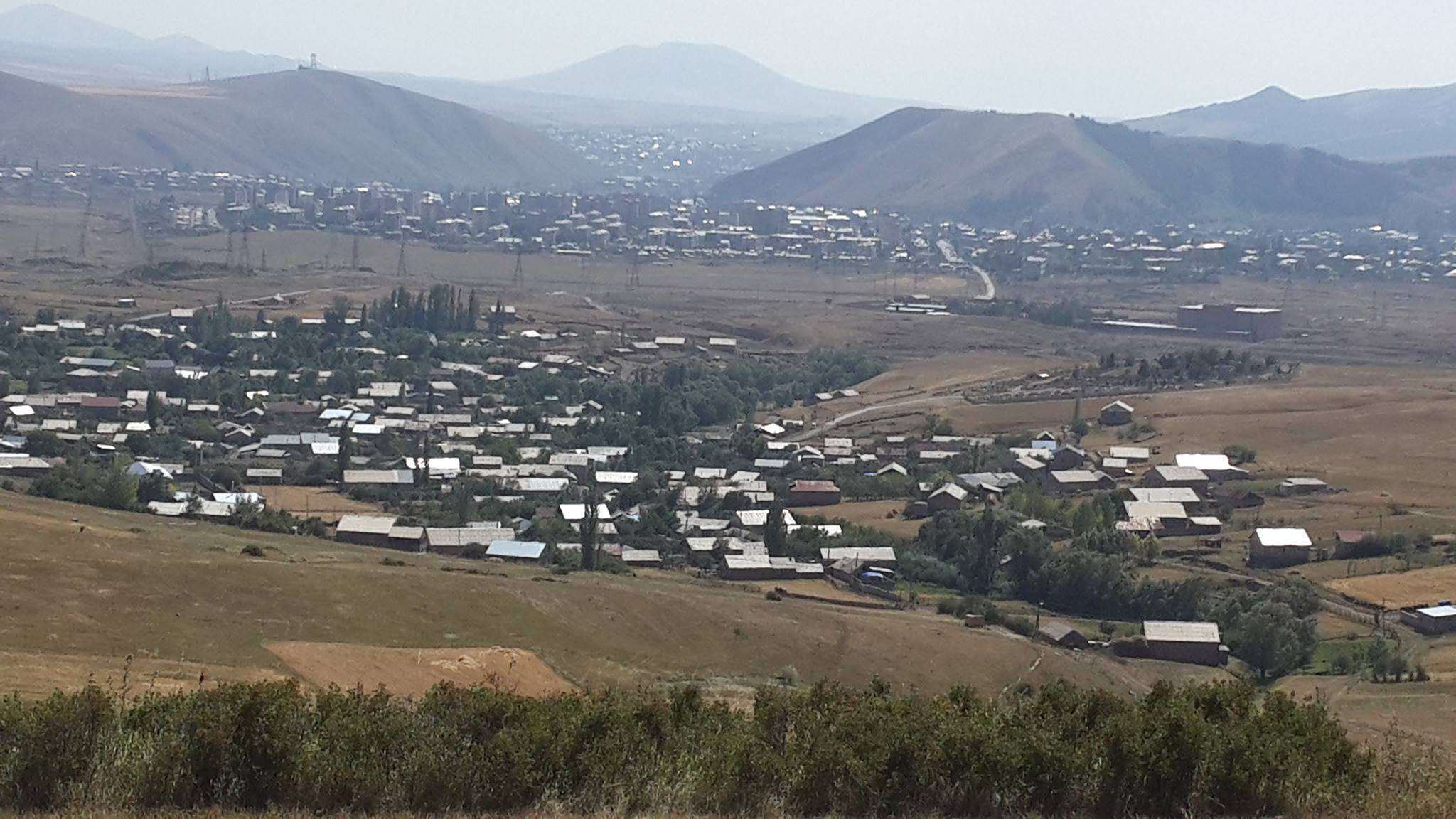
- A view of Zovaber

- Location within Armenia Location within Gegharkunik
- Coordinates: 40°34′02″N 44°47′22″E
- Country: Armenia
- Province: Gegharkunik
- Municipality: Sevan
- Founded: 1830

Area
  - Total: 1.20 km^{2} (0.46 sq mi)
- Elevation: 1,773 m (5,817 ft)

Population (2011)
  - Total: 1,683
  - Density: 1,400/km^{2} (3,630/sq mi)
- Time zone: UTC+4 (AMT)
- Postal code: 1509

Zovaber (Armenian: Զովաբեր), formerly Yaydzhi or Yayji, is a village in the Sevan Municipality of the Gegharkunik Province of Armenia.

== History ==
The village was founded in 1830 by emigrants from Maku. The village has a church of St. Stepanos, built in 1860.

== Gallery ==
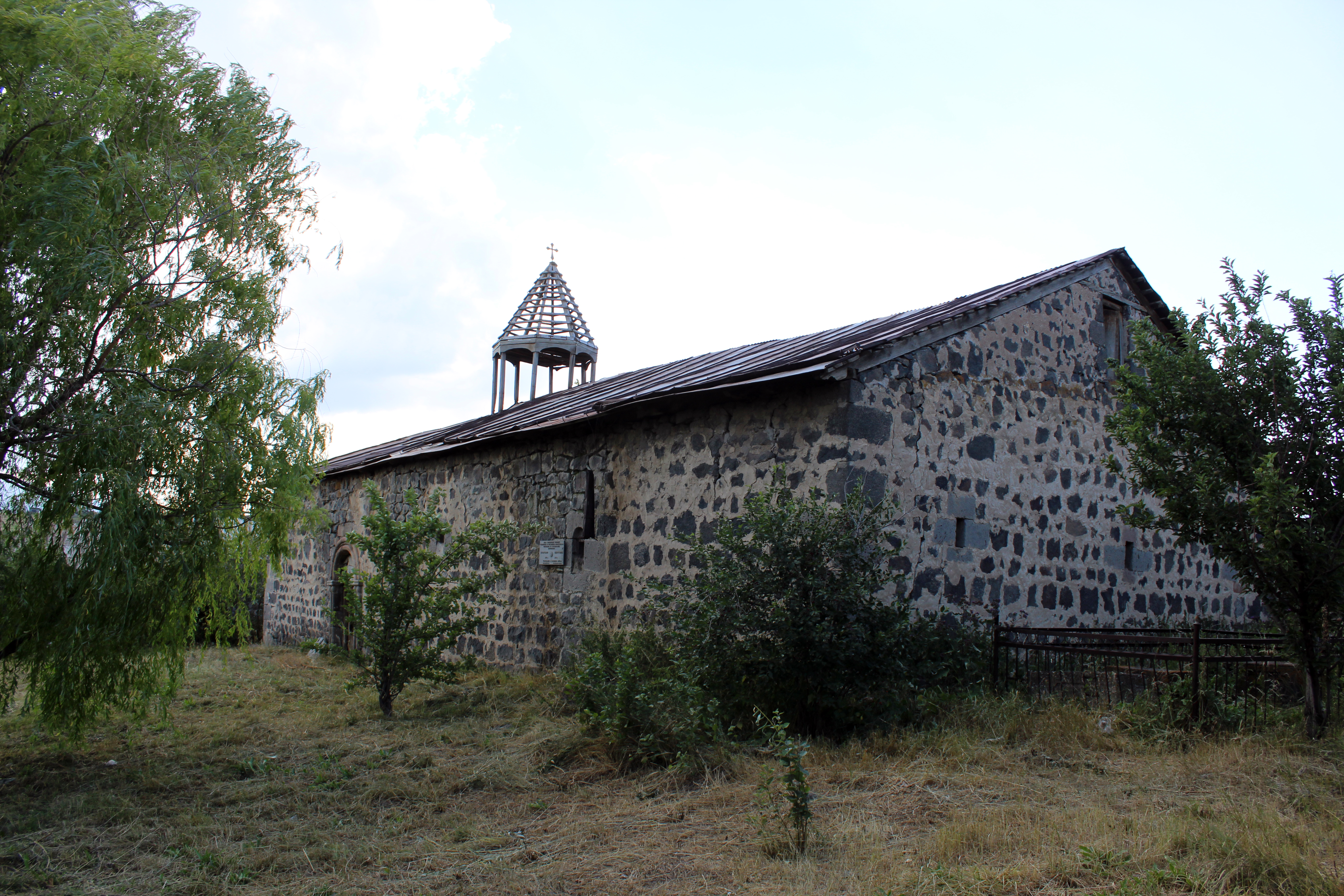
St. Stepanos Church

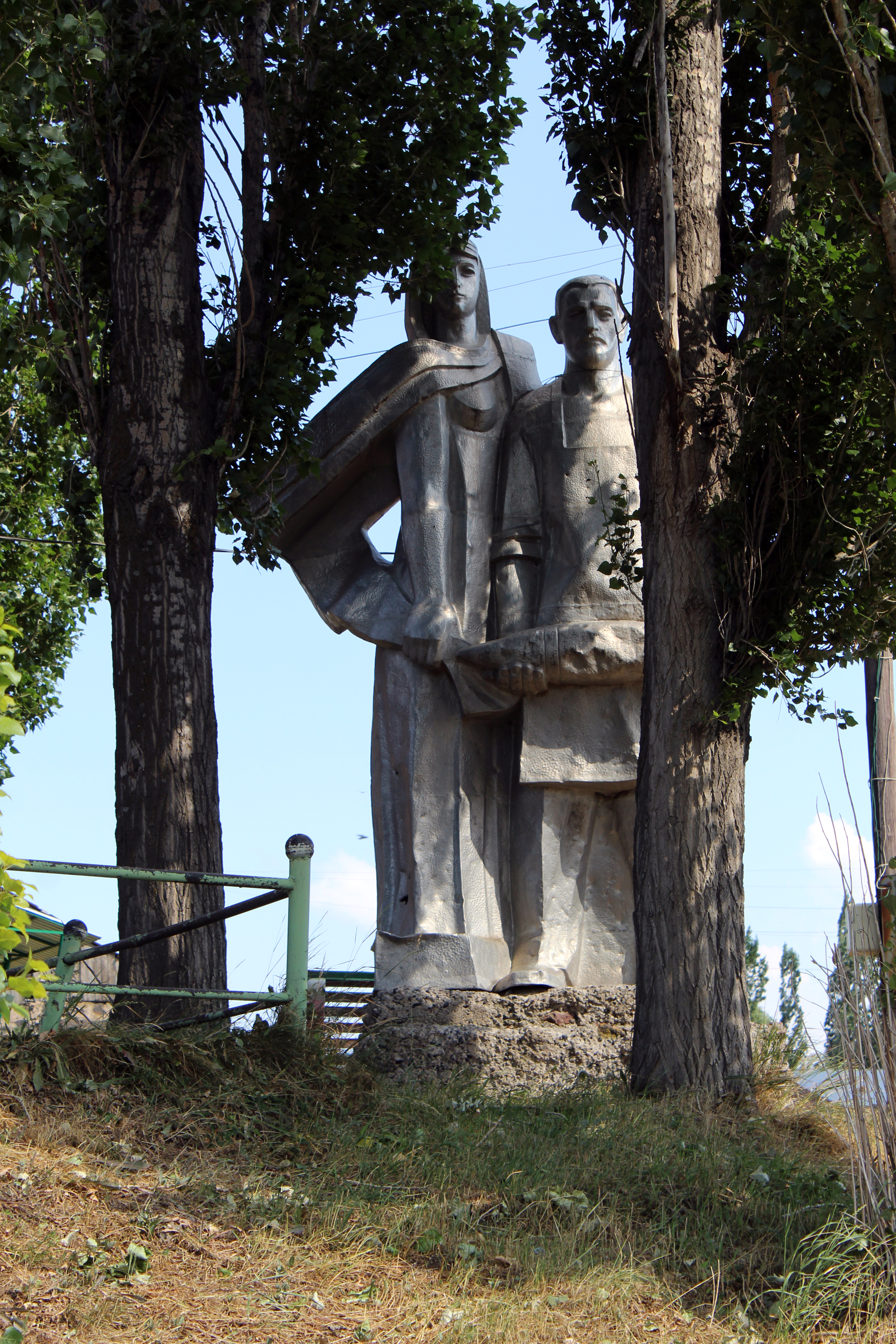
Monument in Zovaber

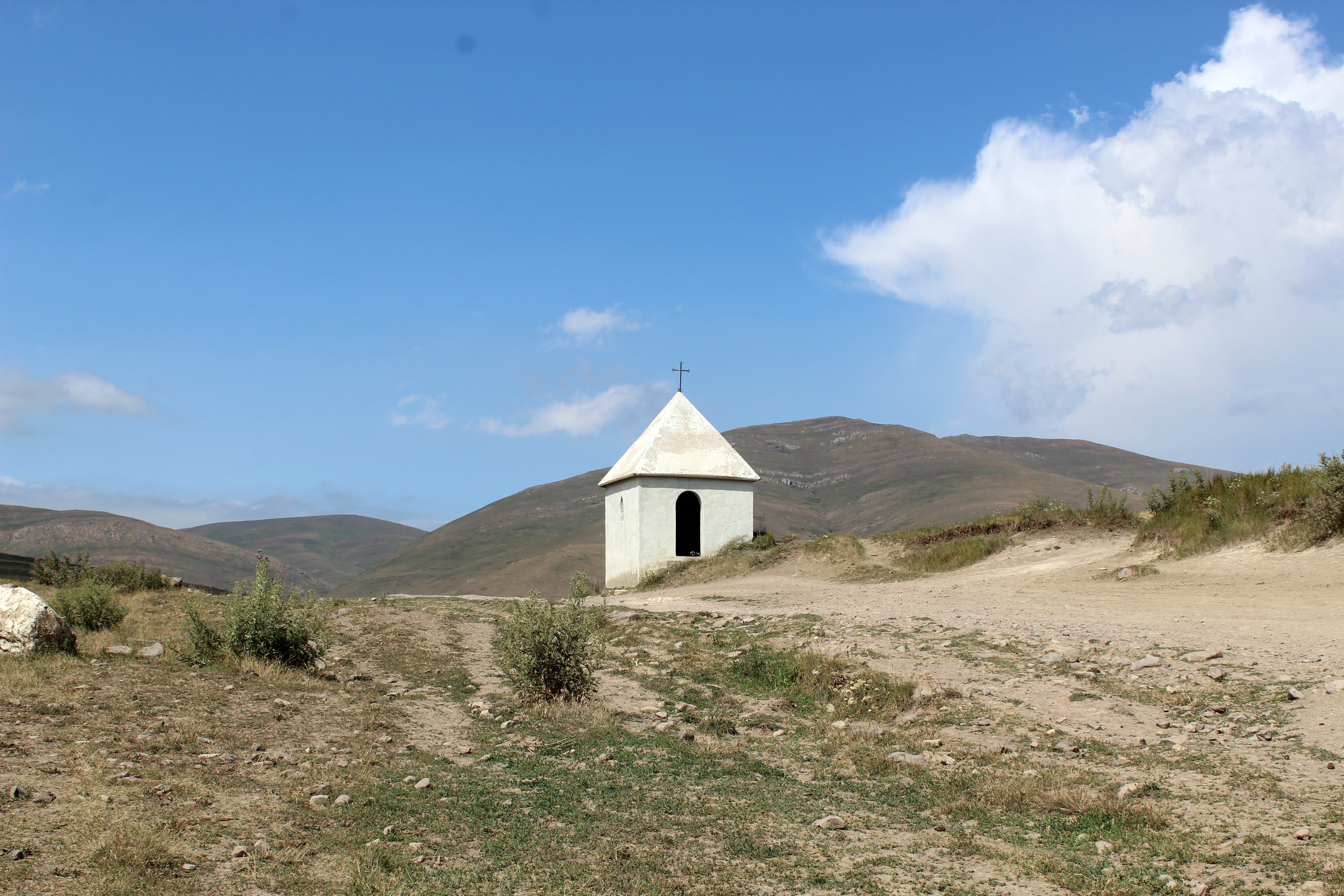
Chapel in Zovaber

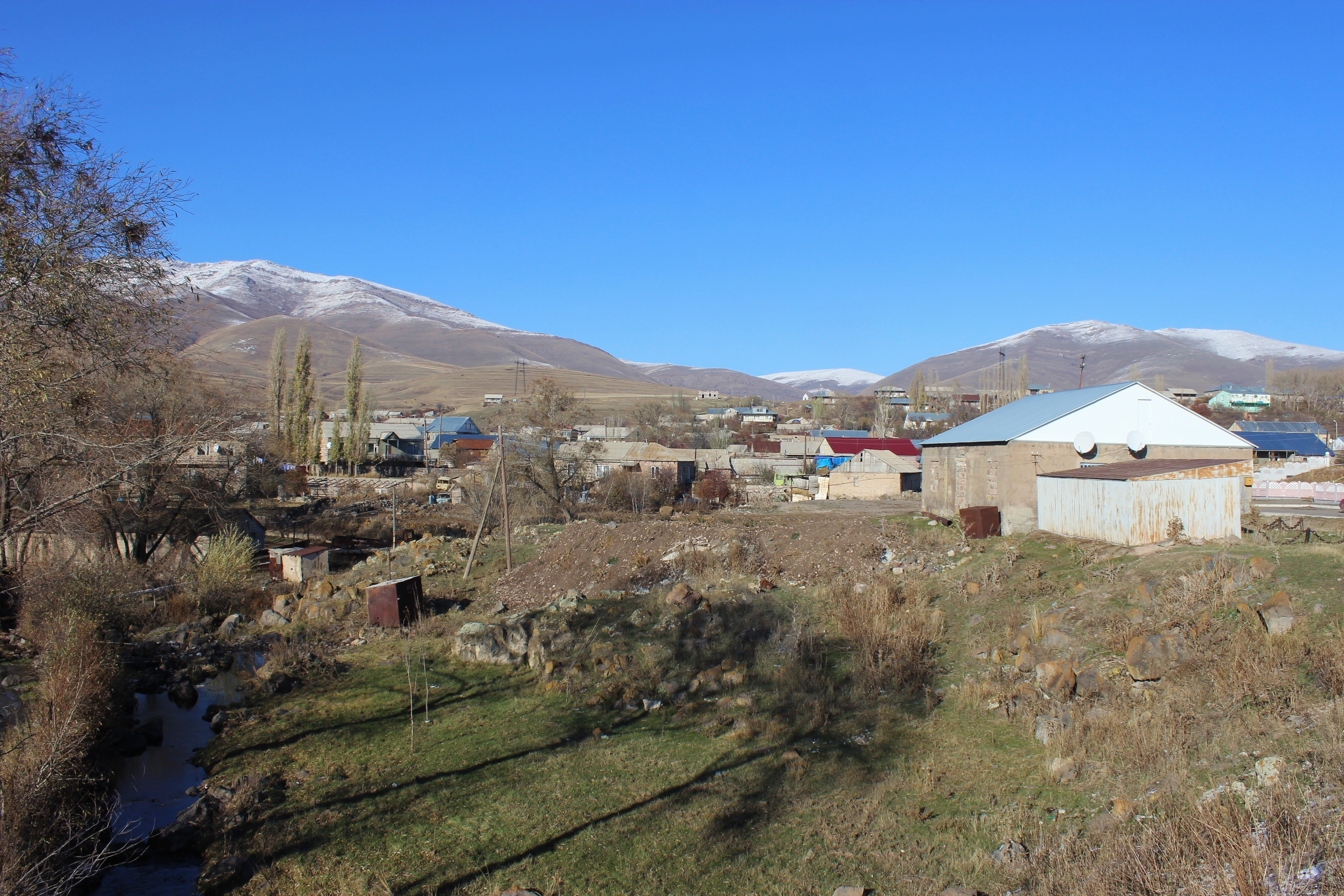
A view of Zovaber, November 2014

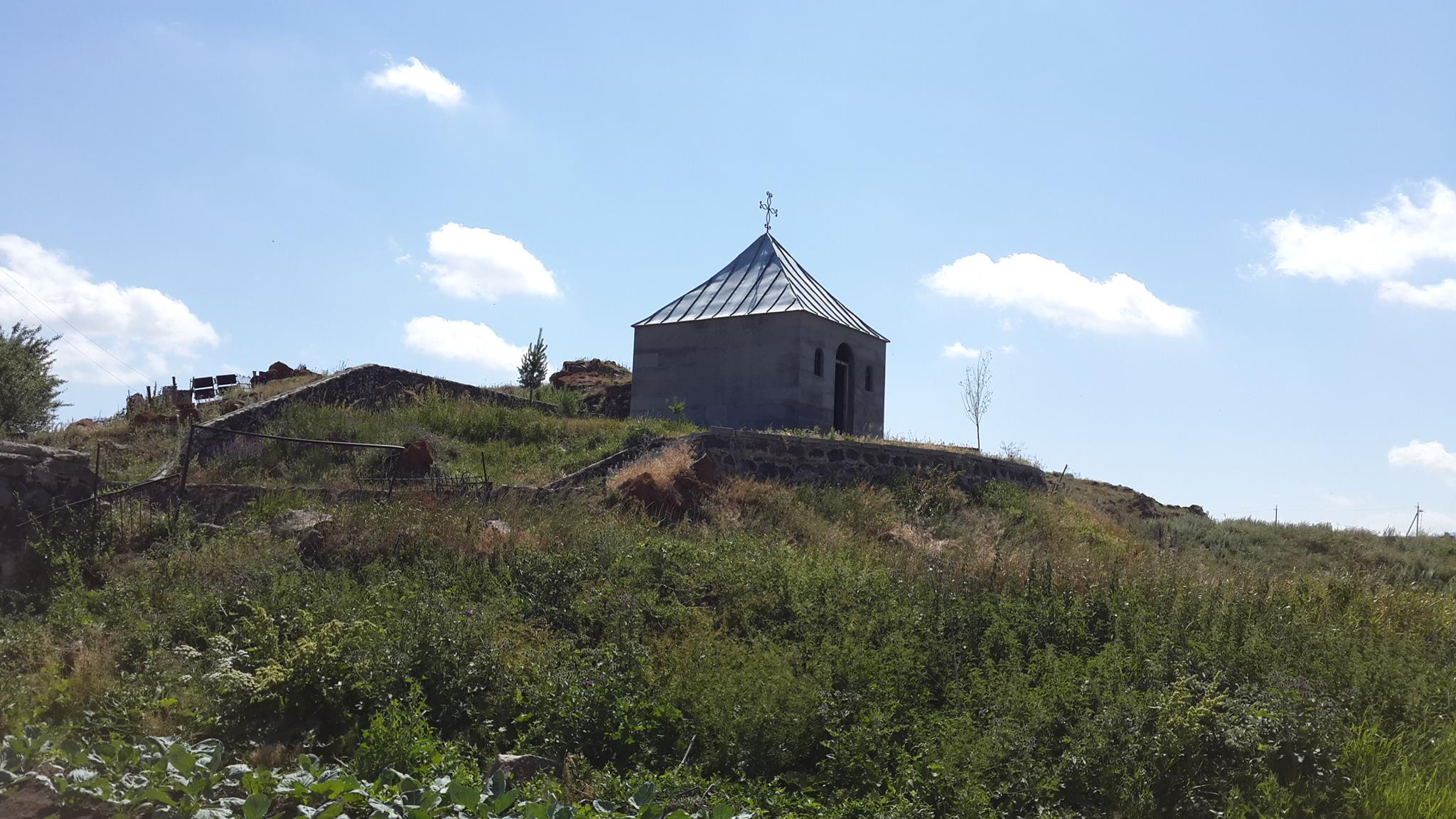
Tukh Manuk in Zovaber
