= Mayisyan, Shirak =

Mayisyan Մայիսյան
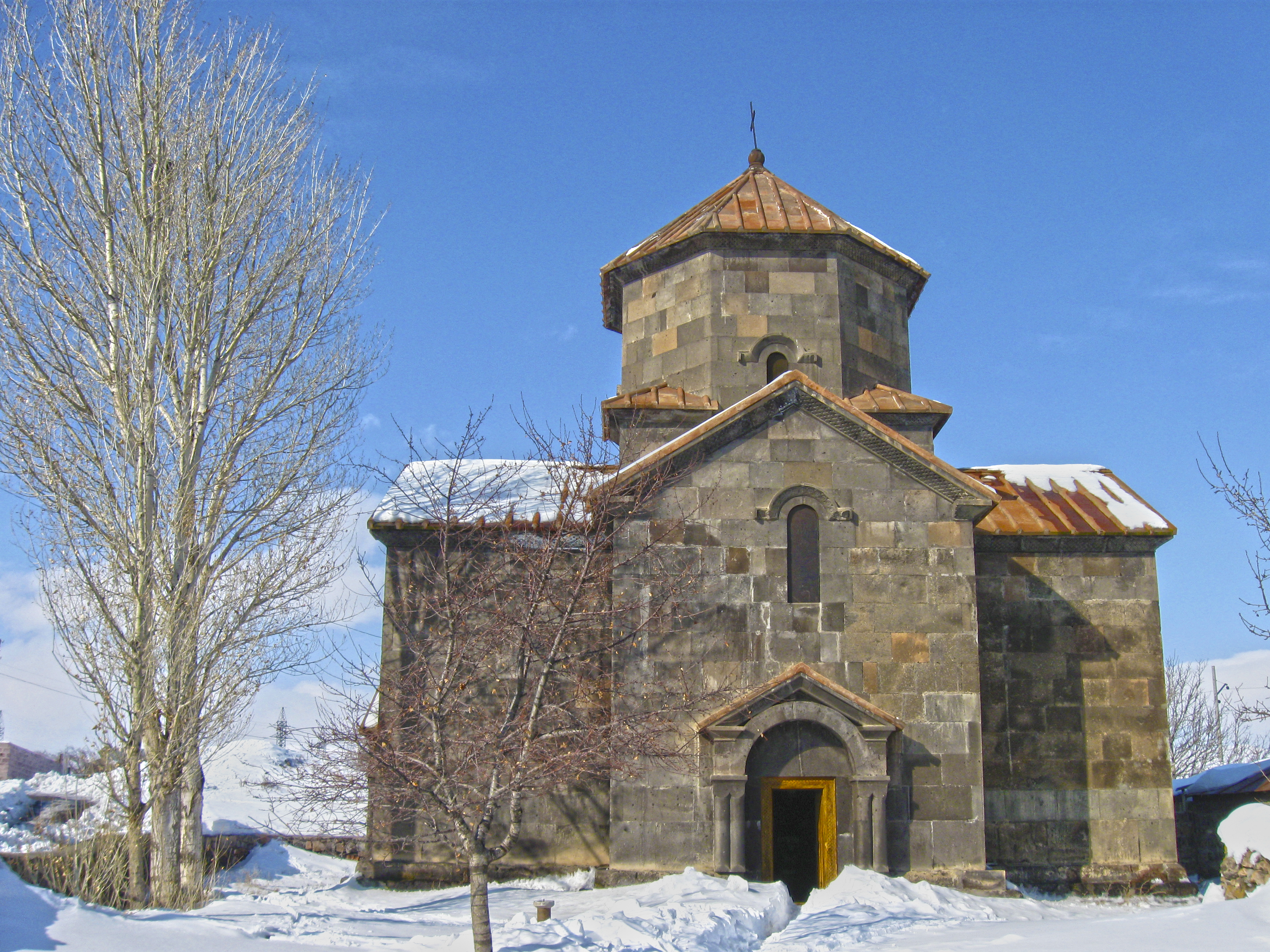

- Location within Armenia Location within Shirak
- Coordinates: 40°51′11″N 43°49′46″E
- Country: Armenia
- Province: Shirak
- Municipality: Akhuryan

Population (2011)
  - Total: 1,682
- Time zone: UTC+4

Mayisyan (Armenian: Մայիսյան) is a village in the Akhuryan Municipality of the Shirak Province of Armenia.

== Demographics ==
Historical population
Year	Pop.	±% p.a.
1831	231	—
1897	677	+1.64%
1926	774	+0.46%
1939	967	+1.73%
1959	1,004	+0.19%
1970	1,065	+0.54%
1979	1,210	+1.43%
1989	1,412	+1.56%
2001	1,653	+1.32%
2011	1,682	+0.17%
