= Verin Sasunik =

Verin Sasunik Վերին Սասունիկ
- Location within Armenia Location within Aragatsotn
- Coordinates: 40°20′N 44°10′E
- Country: Armenia
- Province: Aragatsotn
- Municipality: Ashtarak
- Elevation: 1,625 m (5,331 ft)

Population (2011)
  - Total: 58
- Time zone: UTC+4
  - Summer (DST): UTC+5

Verin Sasunik (Armenian: Վերին Սասունիկ) is a village in the Ashtarak Municipality of the Aragatsotn Province of Armenia. It was depopulated in 1960 and resettled in 1989.
