= Torosgyugh =

Village in Shirak, Armenia

Torosgyugh Թորոսգյուղ
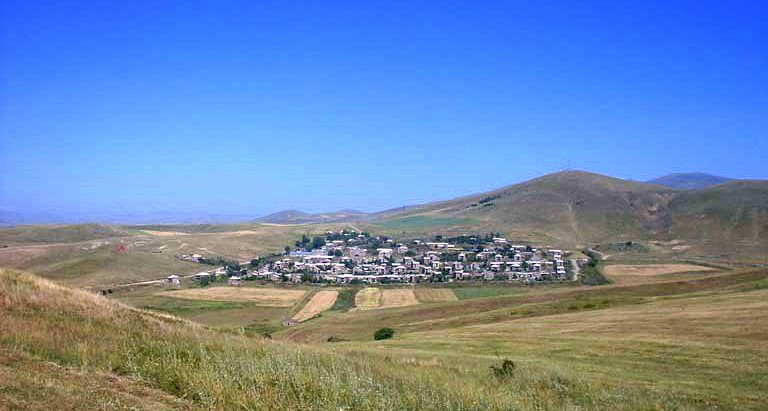
- The village of Torosgyugh.

- Location within Armenia Location within Shirak
- Coordinates: 40°56′06″N 43°52′39″E
- Country: Armenia
- Province: Shirak
- Municipality: Ashotsk

Population (2011)
  - Total: 334
- Time zone: UTC+4
  - Summer (DST): UTC+5

Torosgyugh (Armenian: Թորոսգյուղ) is a village in the Ashotsk Municipality of the Shirak Province of Armenia.

== Demographics ==
Historical population
Year	Pop.	±% p.a.
1831	180	—
1873	435	+2.12%
1897	589	+1.27%
1919	977	+2.33%
1926	461	−10.17%
1931	511	+2.08%
1939	648	+3.01%
1959	321	−3.45%
1979	287	−0.56%
1989	316	+0.97%
2001	325	+0.23%
2011	334	+0.27%
