= Aygut =

Village in Gegharkunik, Armenia

Aygut Այգուտ
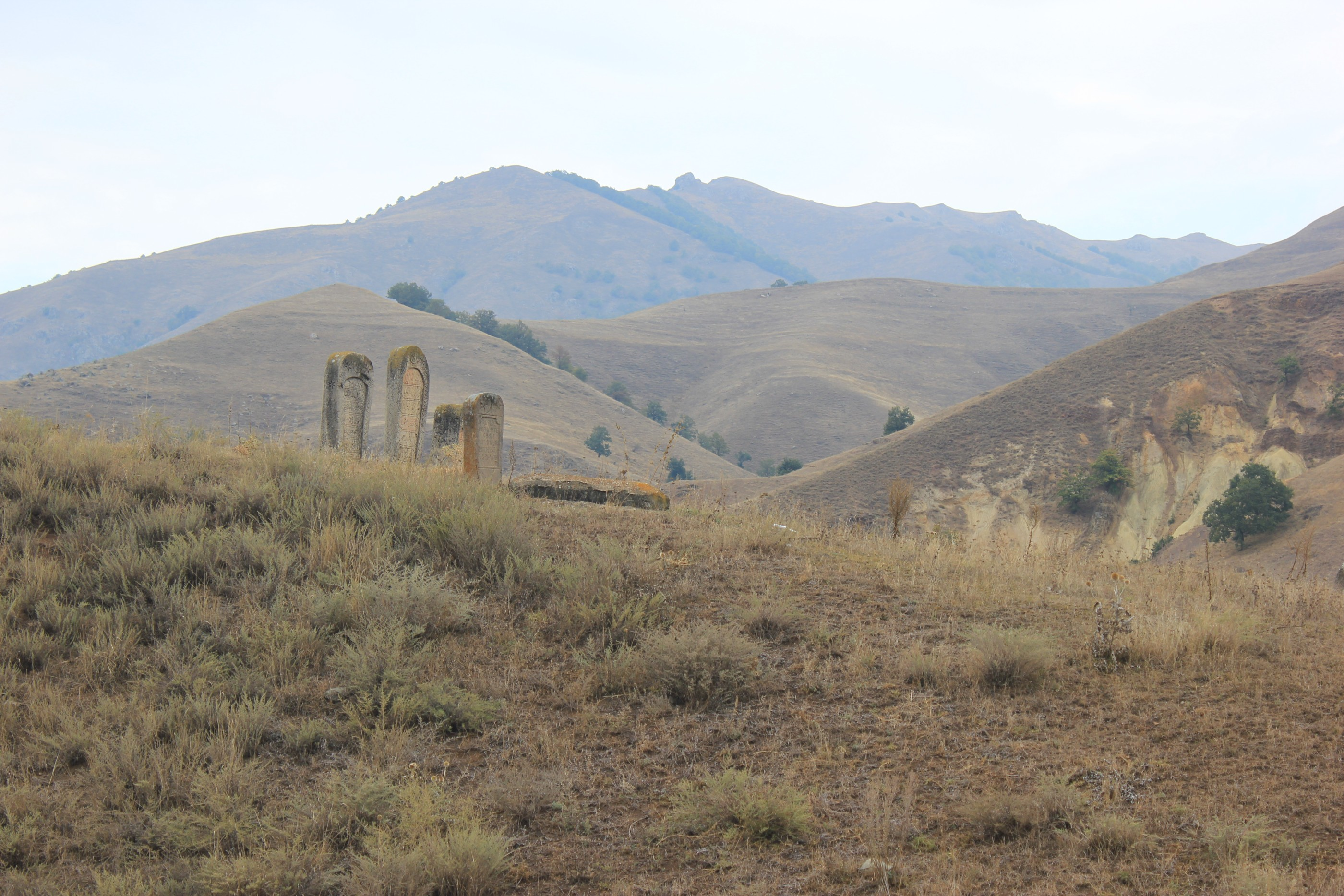
- Scenery around Aygut

- Location within Armenia Location within Gegharkunik
- Coordinates: 40°41′04″N 45°10′25″E
- Country: Armenia
- Province: Gegharkunik
- Municipality: Chambarak
- Elevation: 1,416 m (4,646 ft)

Population (2011)
  - Total: 911
- Time zone: UTC+4 (AMT)
- Postal code: 1306

Aygut (Armenian: Այգուտ; Azerbaijani: Gölkənd, lit. 'Lake village') is a village in the Chambarak Municipality of the Gegharkunik Province of Armenia, located to the north of Lake Sevan. The nearby village of Chapkut also belongs to the community of Aygut. The village was populated by Azerbaijanis before the exodus of Azerbaijanis from Armenia after the outbreak of the Nagorno-Karabakh conflict. In 1988-1989 Armenian refugees from Azerbaijan settled in the village.
