= Artsvaberd =

Village in Berd, Tavush, Armenia

Artsvaberd Արծվաբերդ
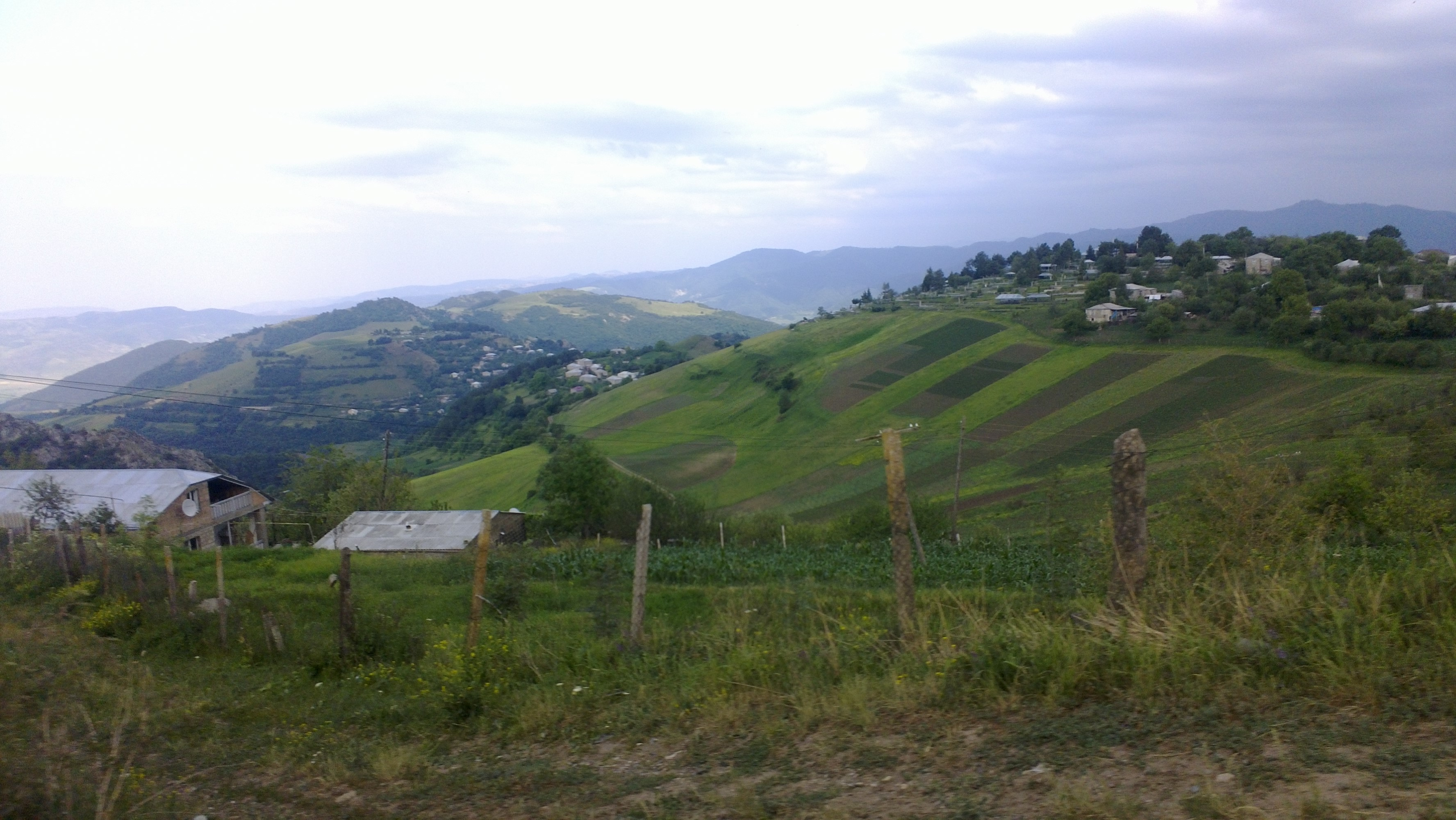
- A view of Artsvaberd

- Location within Armenia Location within Tavush
- Coordinates: 40°50′01″N 45°28′16″E
- Country: Armenia
- Province: Tavush
- Municipality: Berd
- Elevation: 1,290 m (4,230 ft)

Population (2011)
  - Total: 2,847
- Time zone: UTC+4 (AMT)

Artsvaberd (Armenian: Արծվաբերդ) is a village in the Berd Municipality of the Tavush Province of Armenia.

== Gallery ==
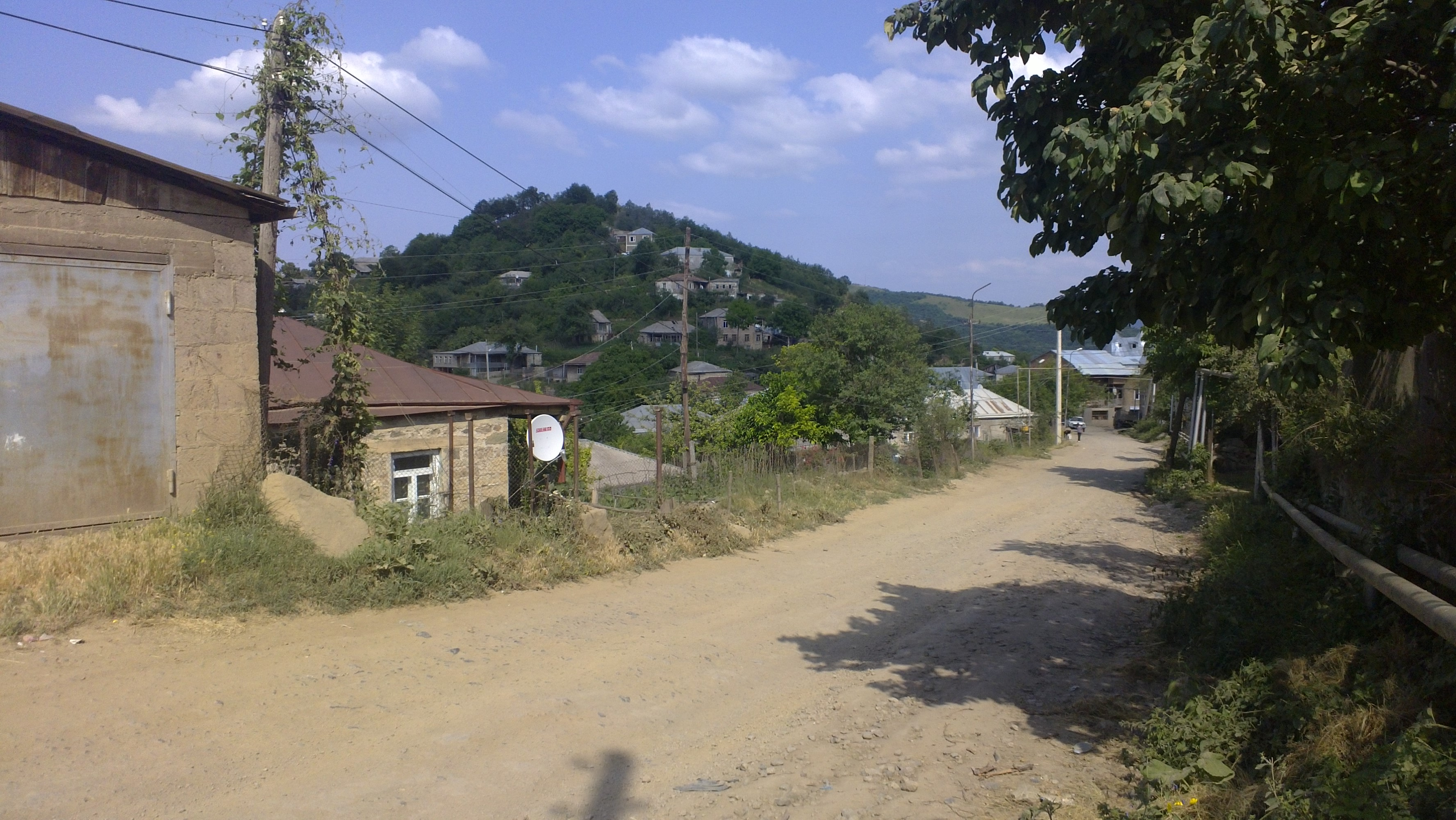

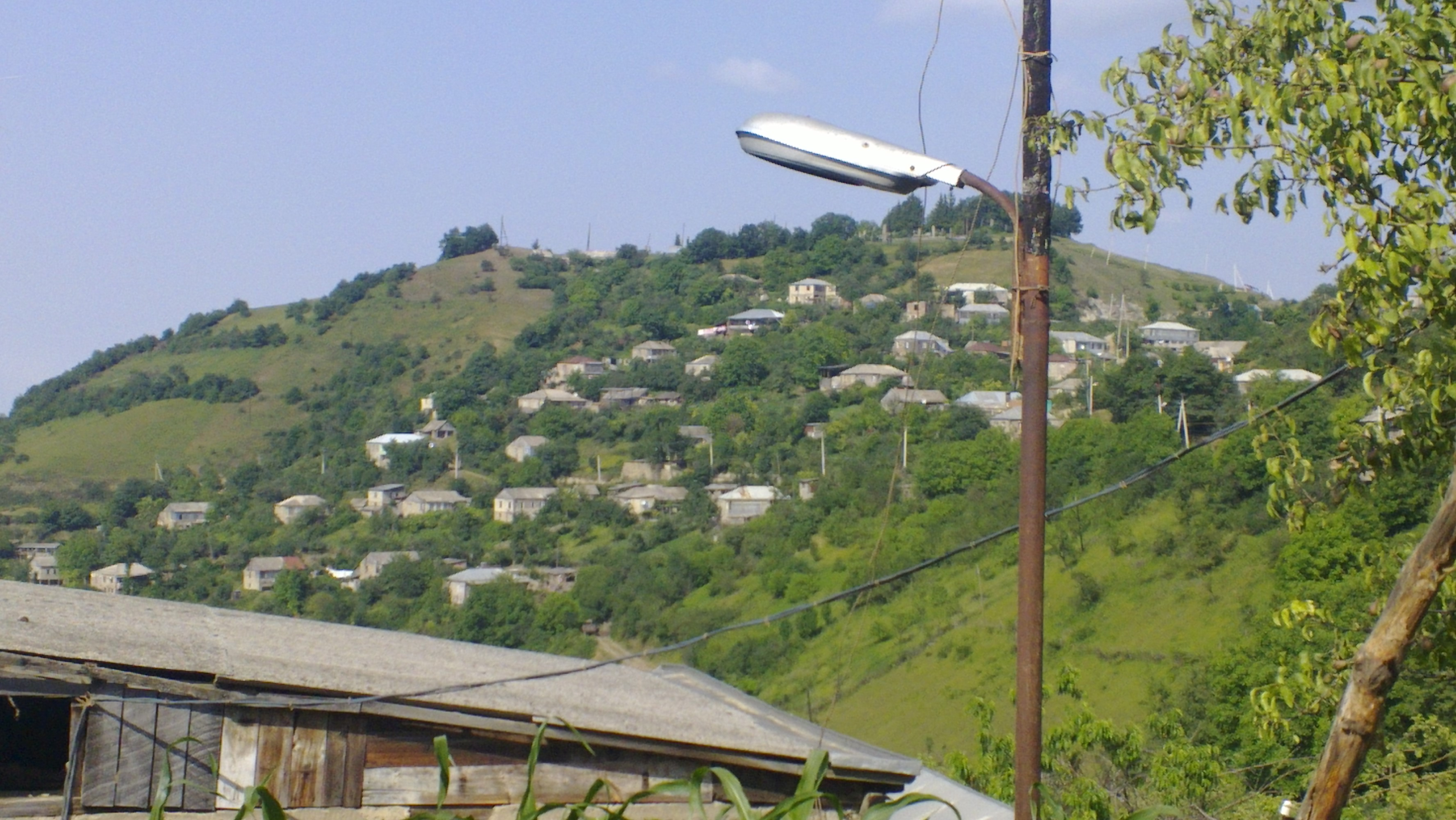

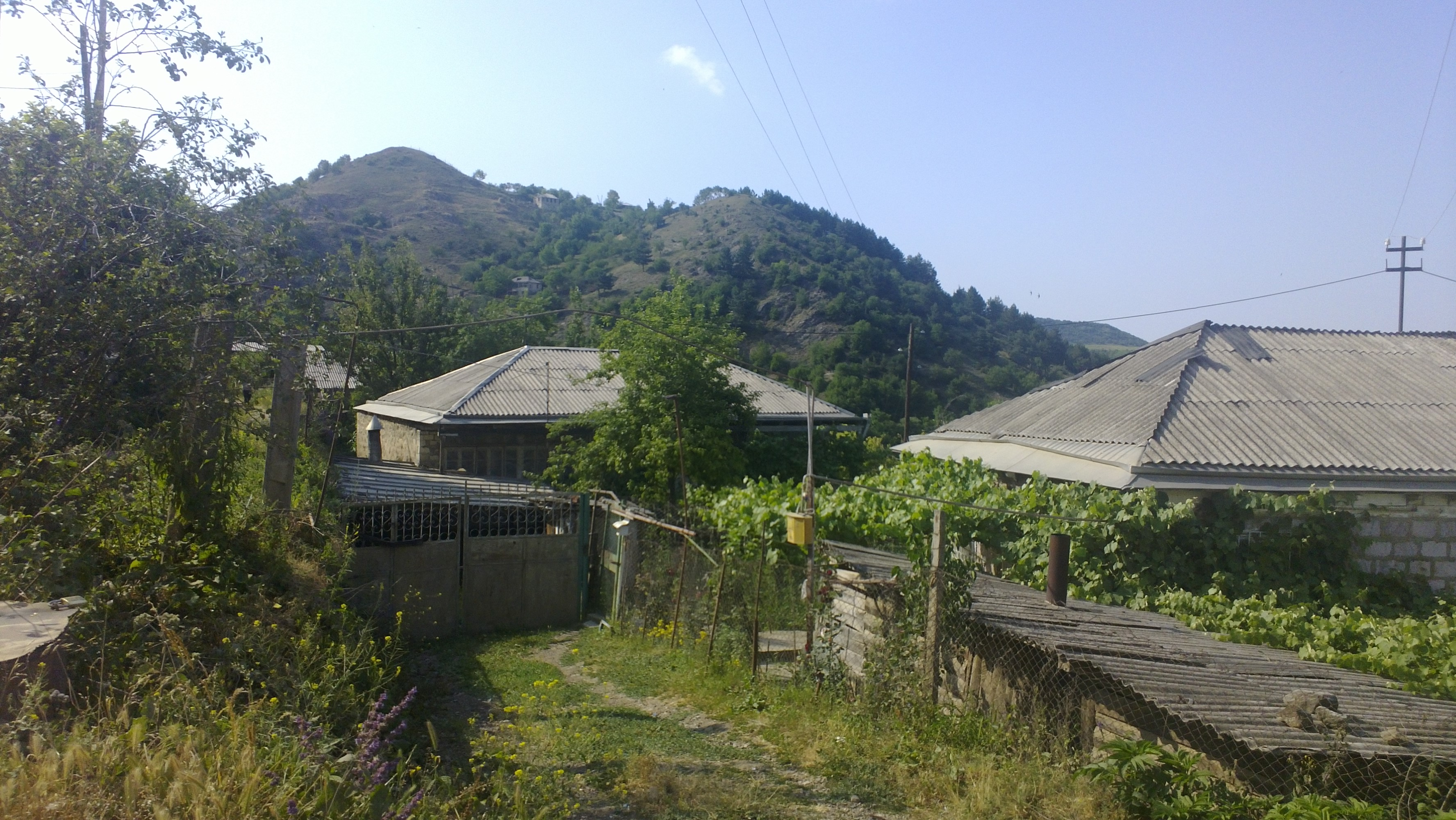

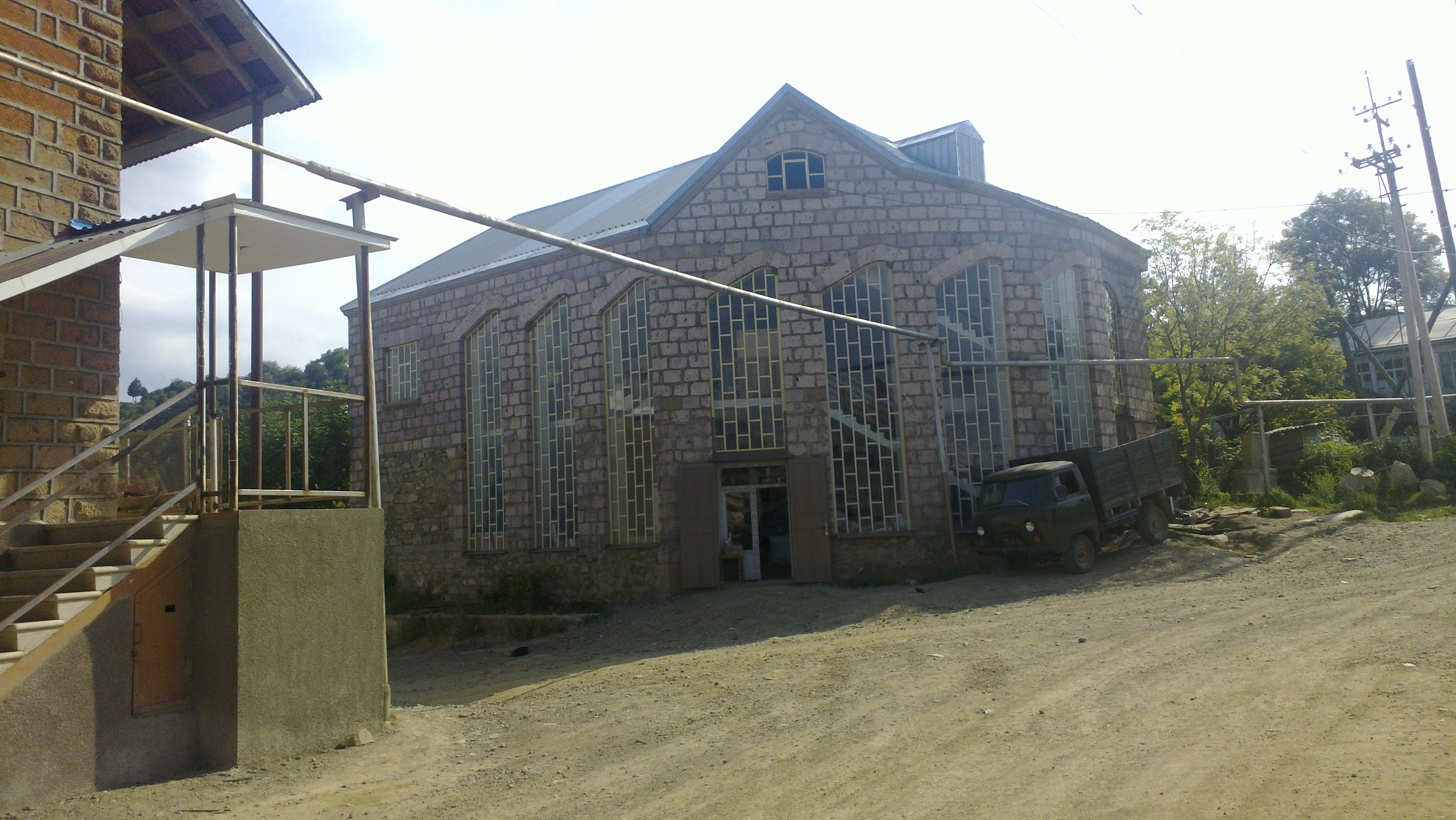
