= Norabak =

Village in Gegharkunik, Armenia

Norabak Նորաբակ
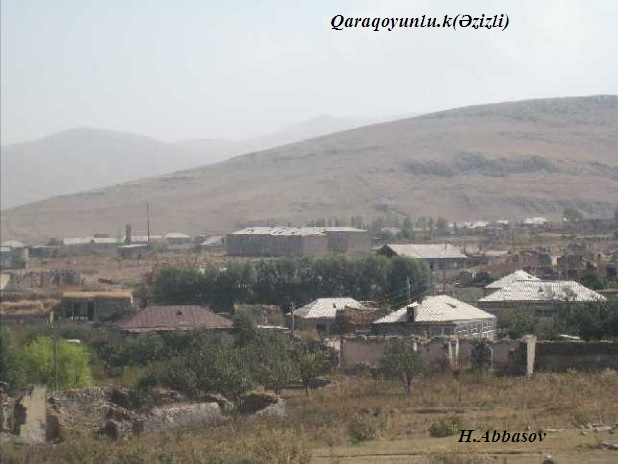
- A view of Norabak

- Location within Armenia Location within Gegharkunik
- Coordinates: 40°09′N 45°52′E
- Country: Armenia
- Province: Gegharkunik
- Municipality: Vardenis

Population (2011)
  - Total: 246
- Time zone: UTC+4 (AMT)

Norabak (Armenian: Նորաբակ) is a village in the Vardenis Municipality of the Gegharkunik Province of Armenia. The village was populated by Azerbaijanis before the exodus of Azerbaijanis from Armenia after the outbreak of the Nagorno-Karabakh conflict. In 1988-1989 Armenian refugees from Azerbaijan settled in the village.

== Etymology ==
The village was also previously known as Azizli. The village was renamed Norabak following Armenia's independence.
