= Tavshut =

Village in Shirak, Armenia

Tavshut Թավշուտ
- Location within Armenia Location within Shirak
- Coordinates: 41°05′N 43°48′E
- Country: Armenia
- Province: Shirak
- Municipality: Ashotsk

Population (2011)
  - Total: 370
- Time zone: UTC+4
  - Summer (DST): UTC+5

Tavshut (Armenian: Թավշուտ) is a village in the Ashotsk Municipality of the Shirak Province of Armenia.

== Demographics ==
The population of the village since 1886 is as follows:

Historical population
Year	Pop.	±% p.a.
1886	125	—
1897	166	+2.61%
1926	224	+1.04%
1939	406	+4.68%
1959	387	−0.24%
1970	352	−0.86%
1979	356	+0.13%
2001	370	+0.18%
2011	370	+0.00%
