= Khashtarak =

Khashtarak Խաշթառակ
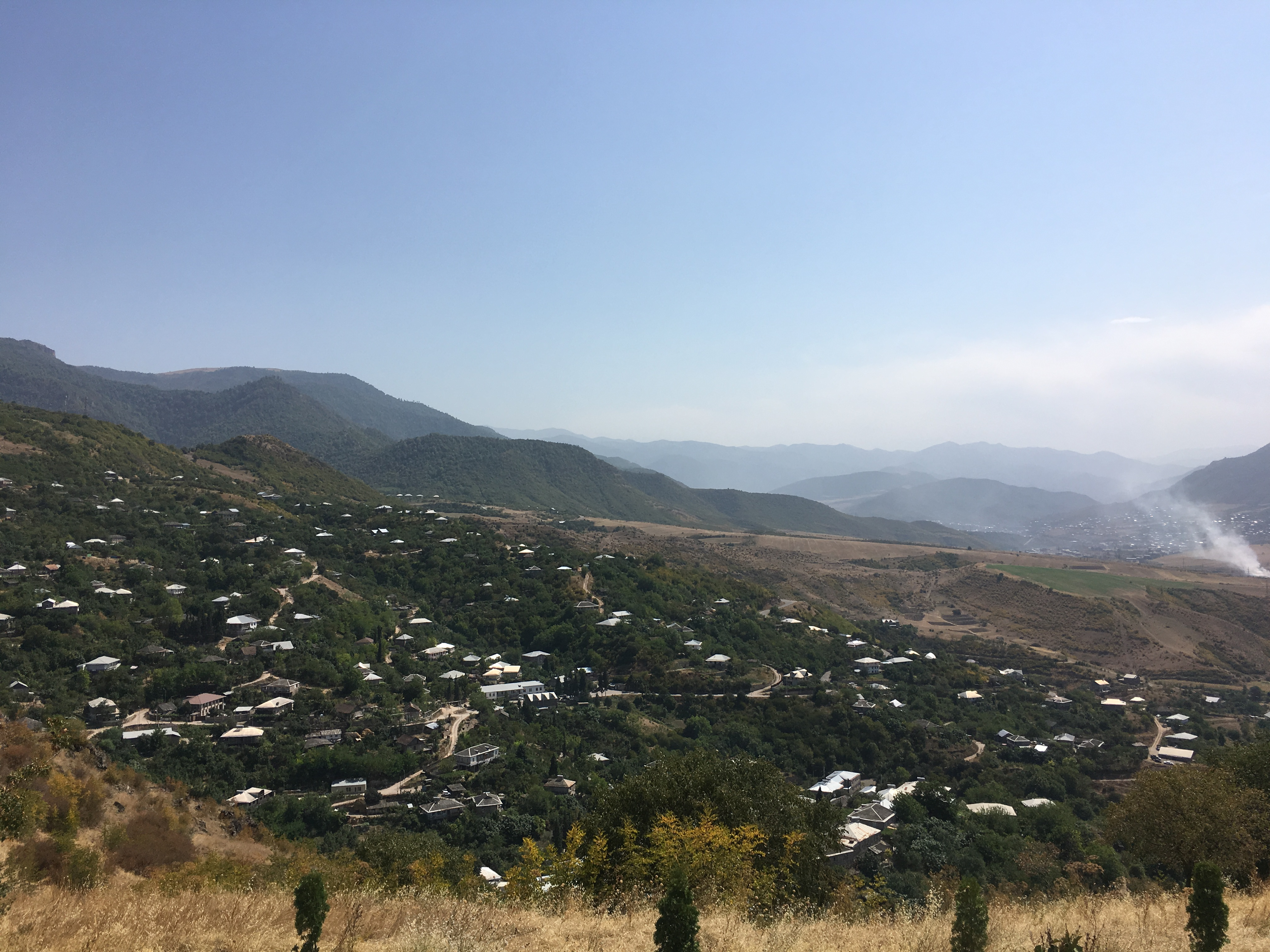
- A view of Khashtarak and surrounding nature

- Location within Armenia Location within Tavush
- Coordinates: 40°56′19″N 45°10′47″E
- Country: Armenia
- Province: Tavush
- Municipality: Ijevan

Population (2011)
  - Total: 1,771
- Time zone: UTC+4 (AMT)

Khashtarak (Armenian: Խաշթառակ) is a village in the Ijevan Municipality of the Tavush Province of Armenia. Within the village is a recently built church, and close by, to the west and the southeast of the village are some abandoned medieval settlements with khachkars.

== Education and health care ==
There have been several charitable activities organized by the Armenia Fund in Khashtarak in recent times. The medical center of the village, the kindergarten and the public school were all renovated by the efforts of diaspora Armenians.

== Gallery ==
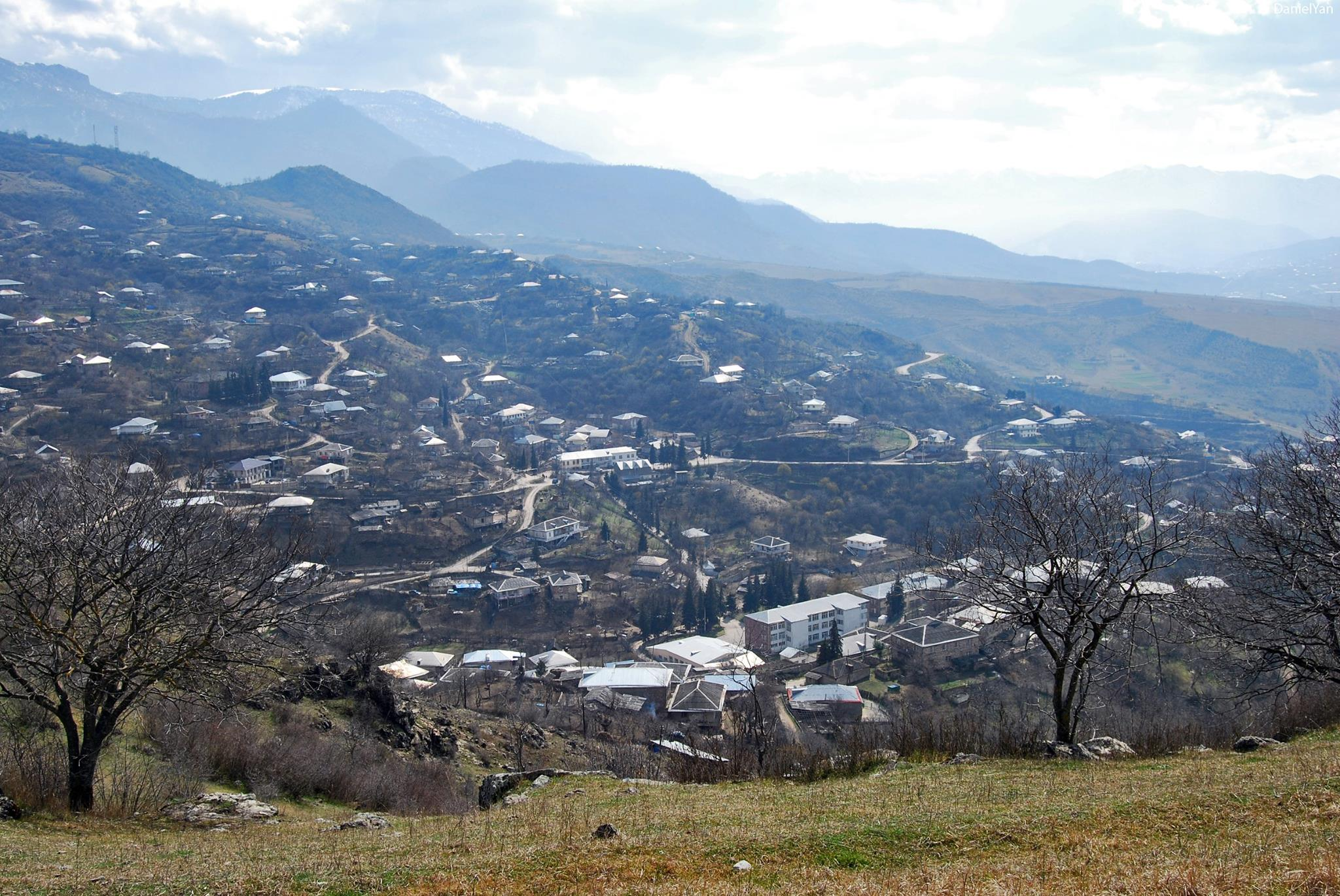
A view of Khashtarak

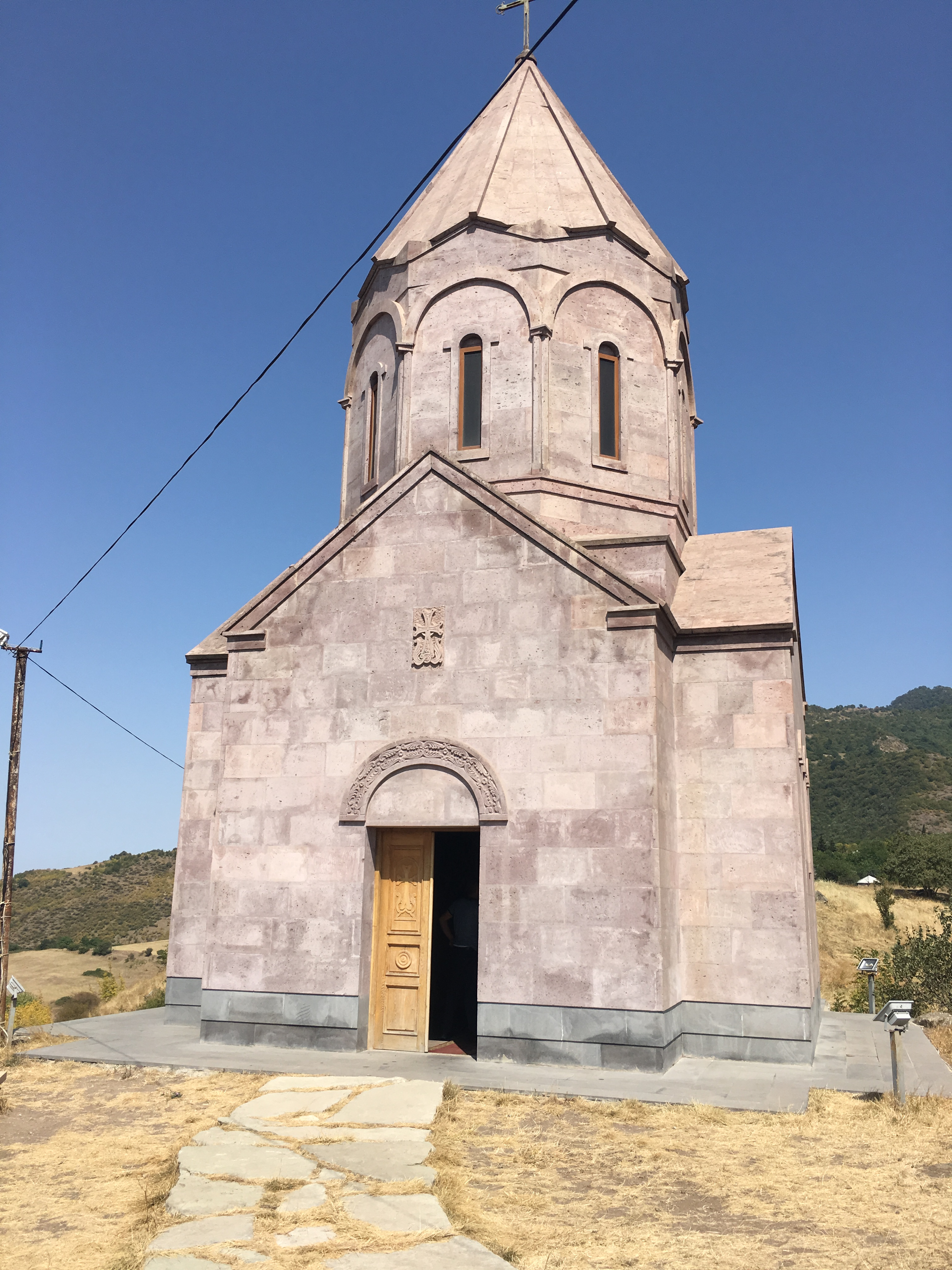
St. David Church in Khashtarak

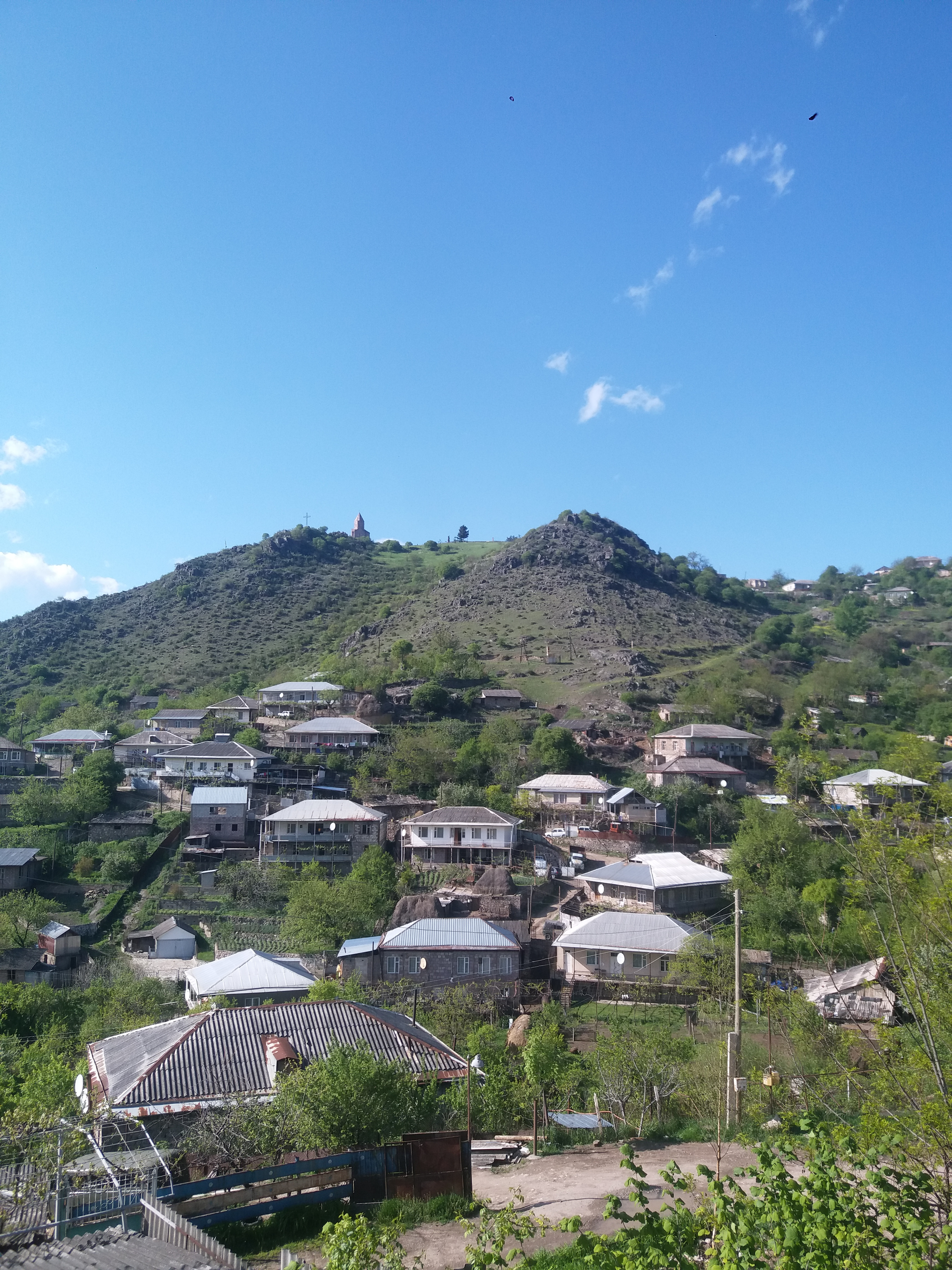
Houses in Khashtarak

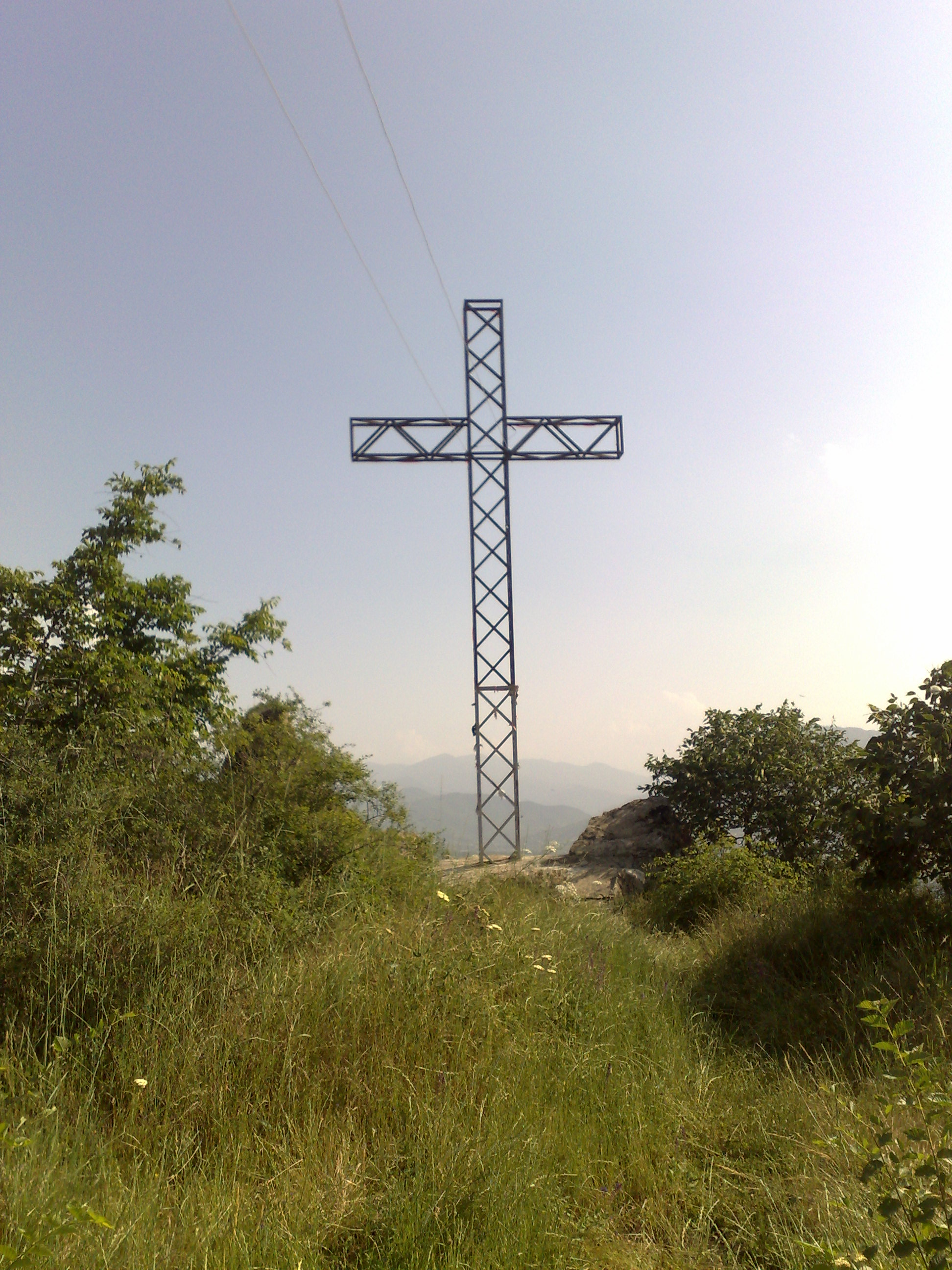
One of the three cross-symbols of Khashtarak

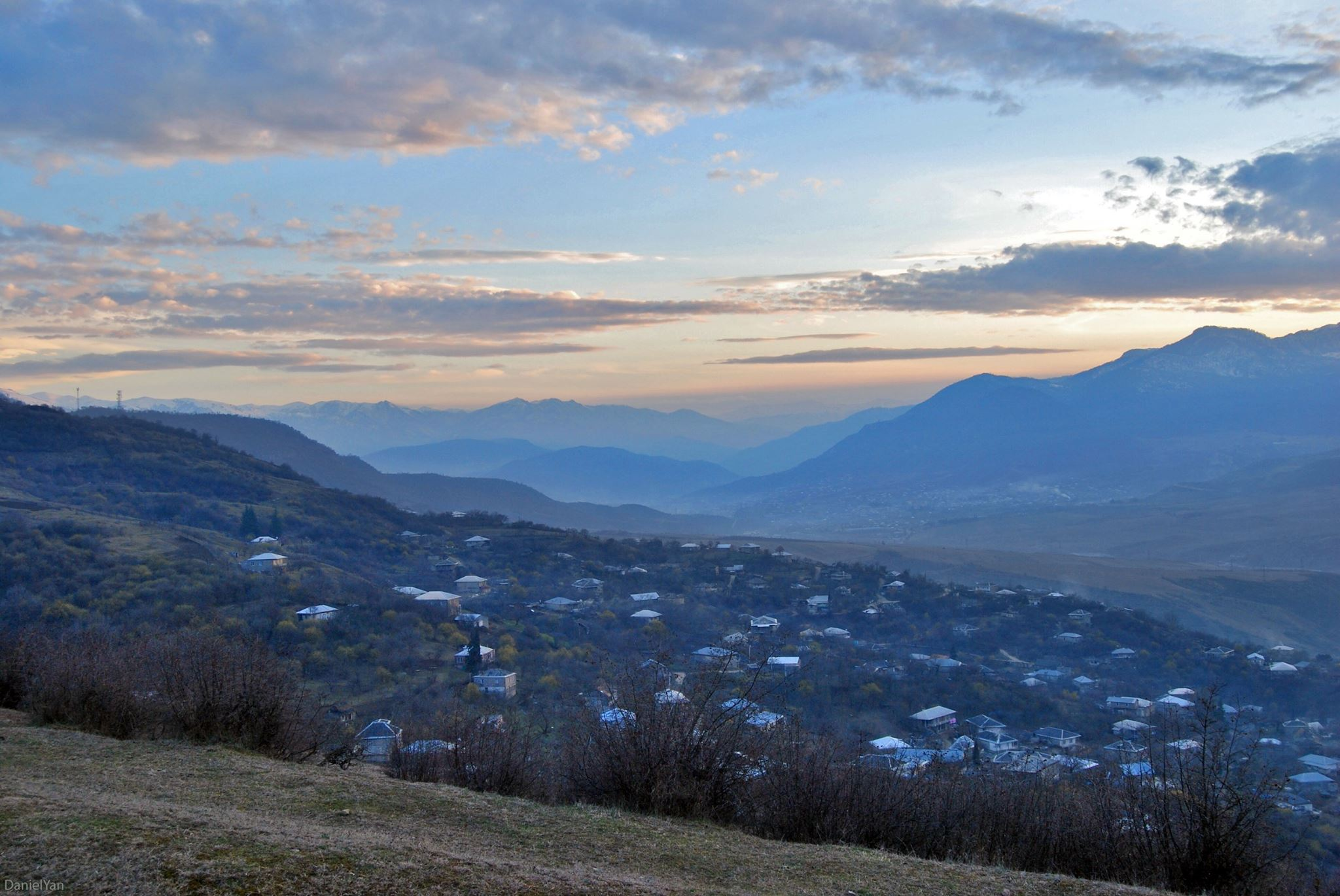
A view of Khashtarak and surrounding nature

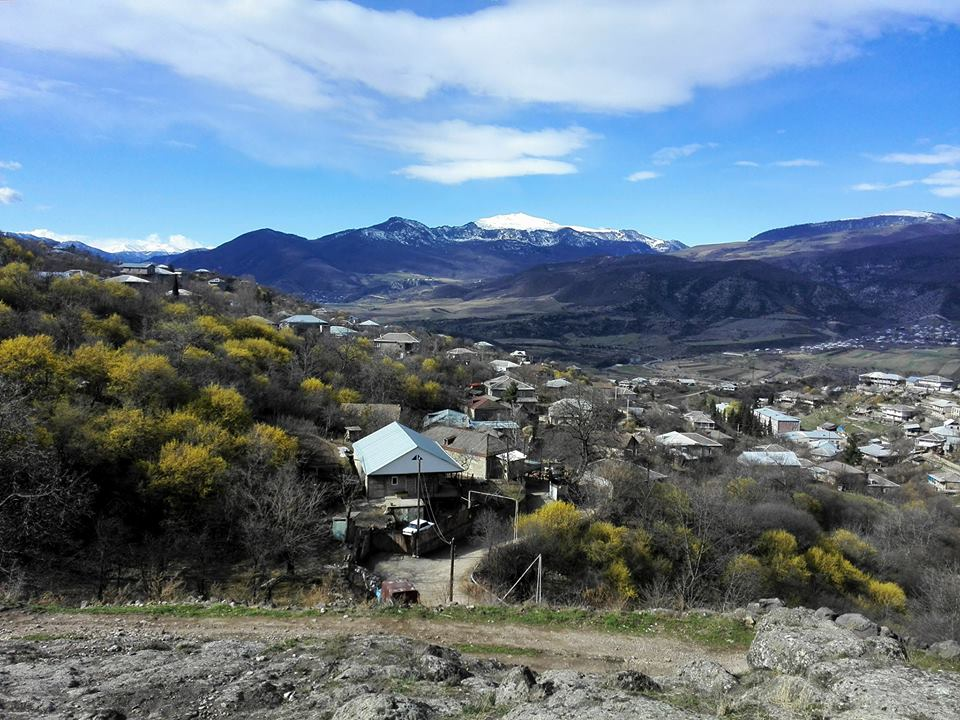
A view of Khashtarak

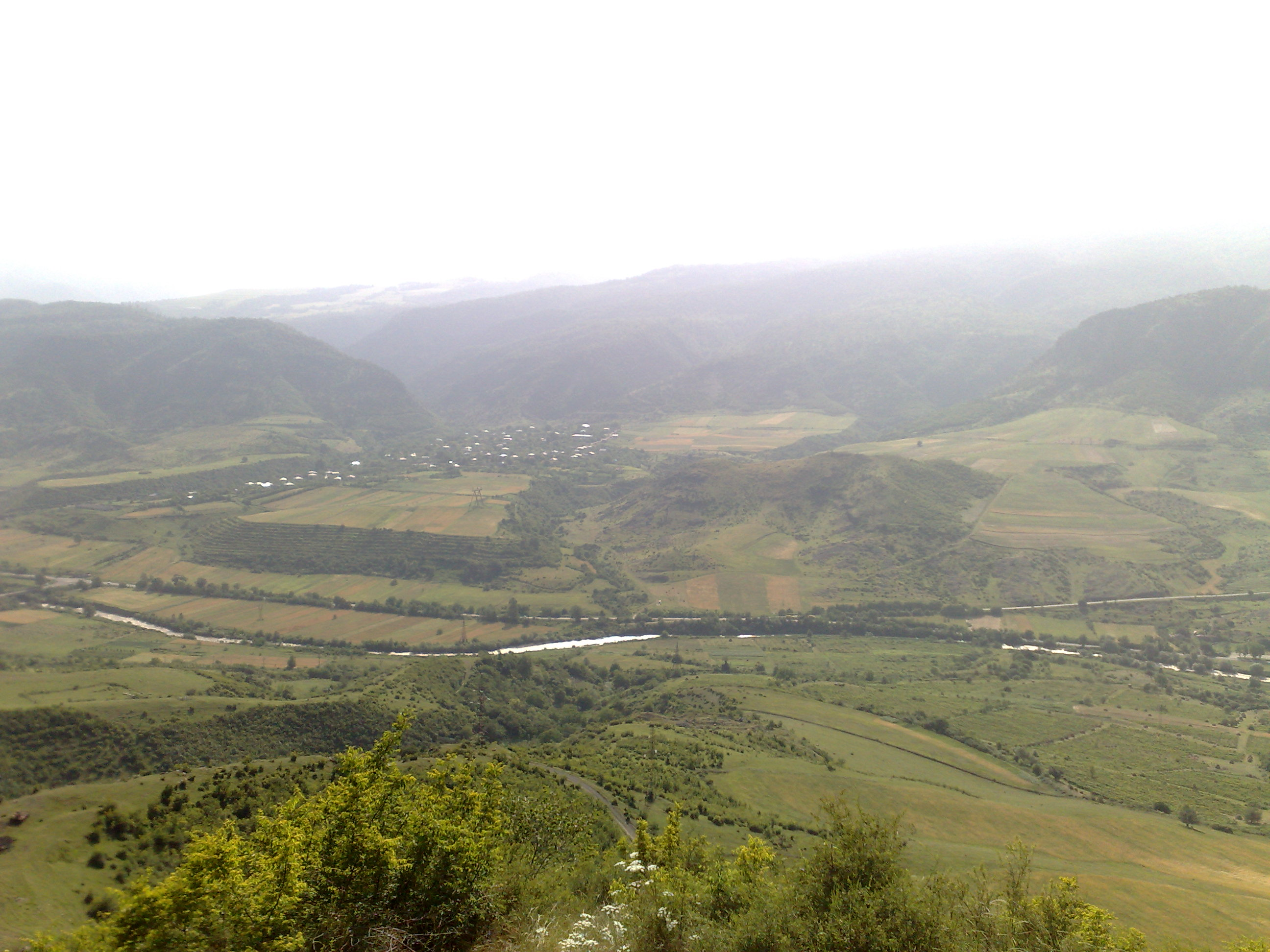
Landscape around Khashtarak

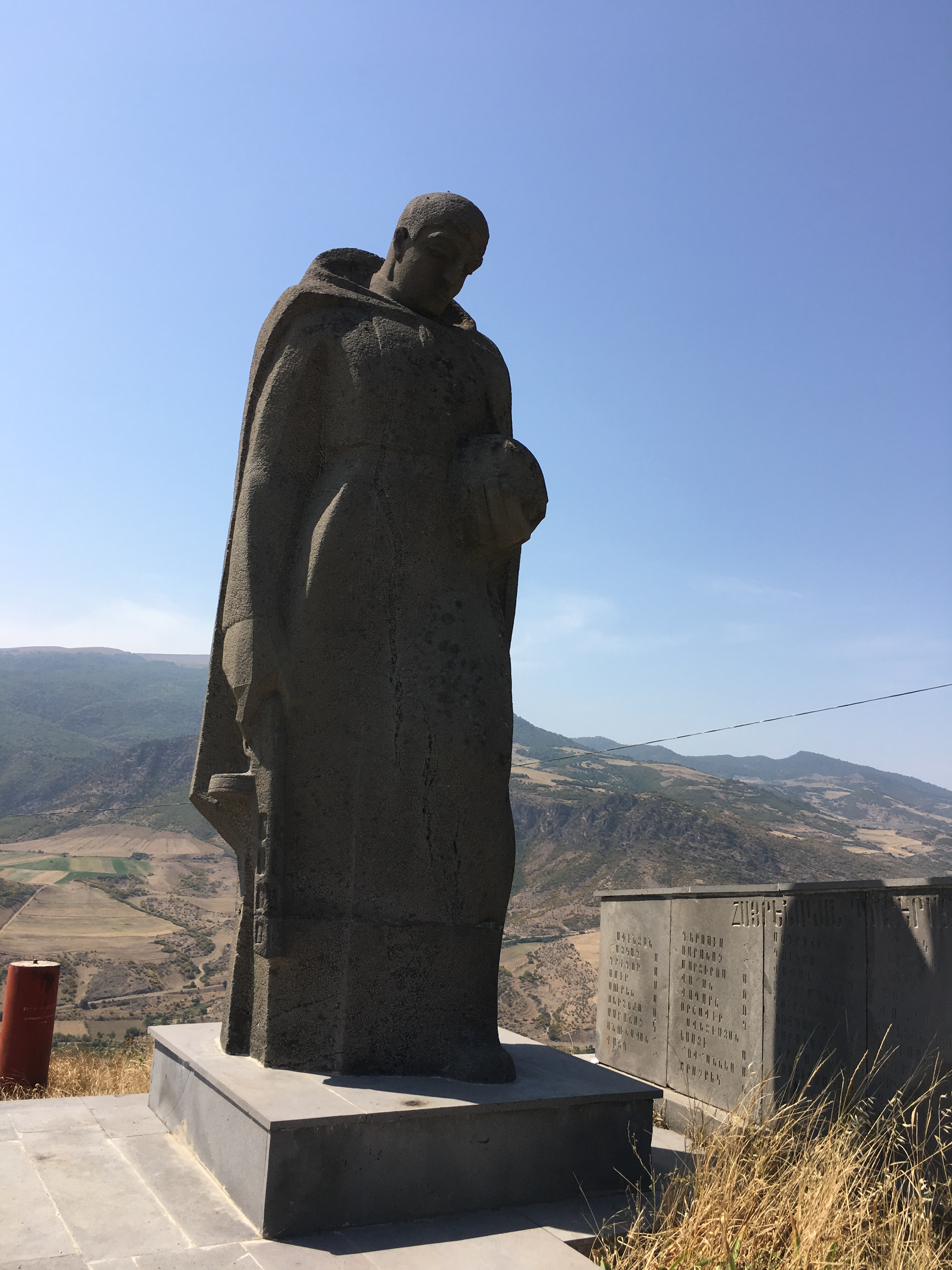
WWII monument in Khashtarak
