= Verin Sasnashen =

Verin Sasnashen Վերին Սասնաշեն
- Location within Armenia Location within Aragatsotn
- Coordinates: 40°22′N 43°59′E
- Country: Armenia
- Province: Aragatsotn
- Municipality: Talin
- Elevation: 1,900 m (6,200 ft)

Population (2011)
  - Total: 328
- Time zone: UTC+4
  - Summer (DST): UTC+5

Verin Sasnashen (Armenian: Վերին Սասնաշեն) is a village in the Talin Municipality of the Aragatsotn Province of Armenia.
