= Saralanj, Lori =

Saralanj Սարալանջ
- Location within Armenia
- Coordinates: 40°52′32″N 44°05′50″E
- Country: Armenia
- Marz (Province): Lori
- Elevation: 1,800 m (5,900 ft)

Population (2011)
  - Total: 188
- Time zone: UTC+4 ( )
  - Summer (DST): UTC+5 ( )

Saralanj (Armenian: Սարալանջ, also Romanized as Saralandzh and Saralandj; formerly, Gey Yekhush) is a town in the Lori Province of Armenia.
