= Yervandashat, Armenia =

Village in Armavir, Armenia

Yervandashat Երվանդաշատ
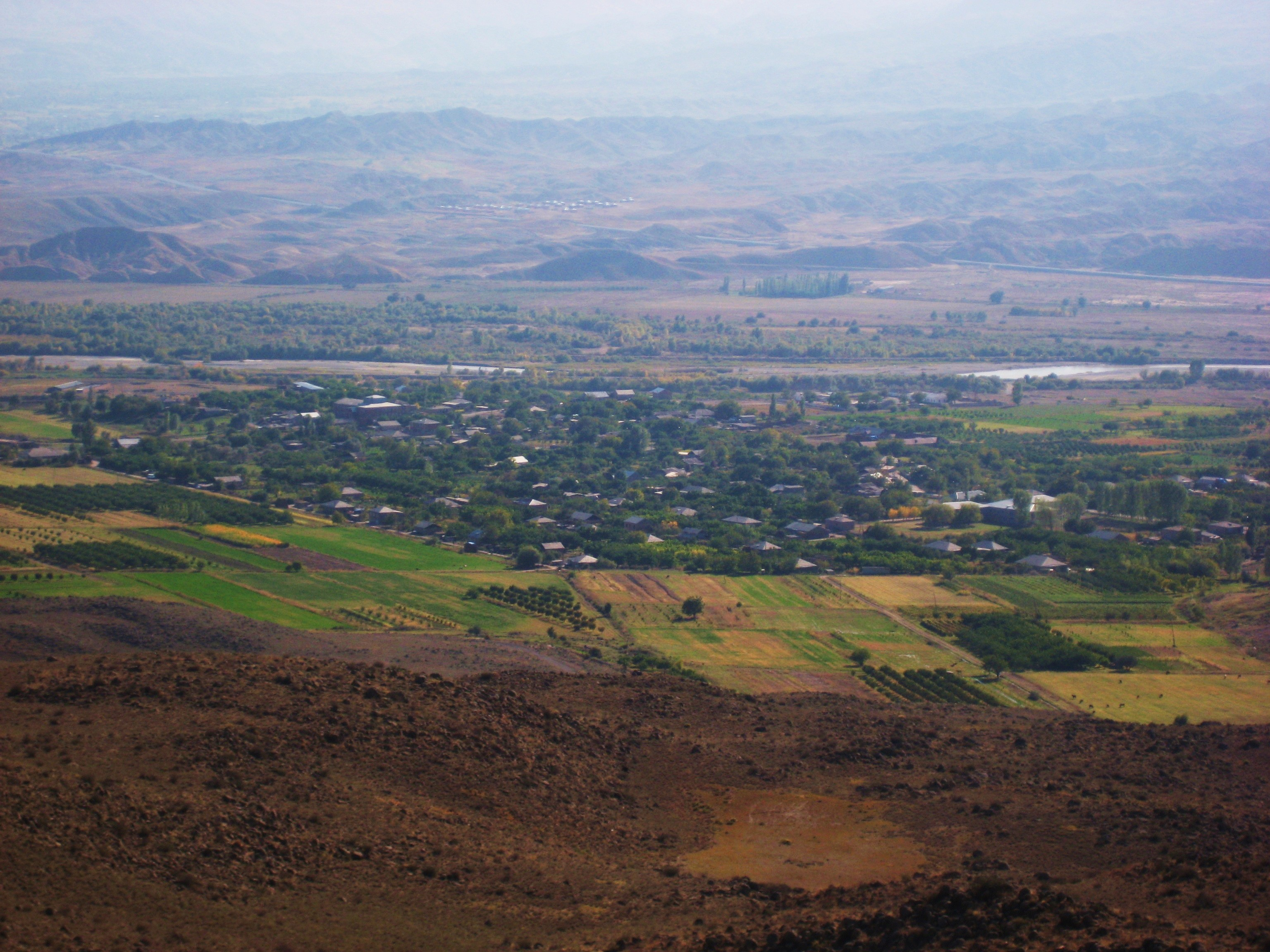
- Overlooking the village of Yervandashat

- Location within Armenia
- Coordinates: 40°06′53″N 43°40′15″E
- Country: Armenia
- Marz (Province): Armavir
- Founded: 3rd century BCE

Population (2011)
  - Total: 654
- Time zone: UTC+4 ( )
  - Summer (DST): UTC+5 ( )

Yervandashat (Armenian: Երվանդաշատ) is a village in the Armavir Province of Armenia. The village has a ruined basilica dated to the 4th or 5th century and the Saint Shushanik church of the 10th to 17th century. Along the main highway leading to and from the area are khachkars (artistically carved stone crosses). It is named after the nearby Armenian historic city of Yervandashat.

== See also ==
- Armavir Province
