= Aygek =

Village in Armavir, Armenia

Aygek Այգեկ
- Location within Armenia
- Coordinates: 40°11′19″N 44°23′00″E
- Country: Armenia
- Marz (Province): Armavir
- Founded: 1946

Area
  - Total: 4.26 km^{2} (1.64 sq mi)
- Elevation: 870 m (2,850 ft)

Population (2011)
  - Total: 1,443
- Time zone: UTC+4 ( )
  - Summer (DST): UTC+5 ( )

Aygek (Armenian: Այգեկ) is a village and a rural community in the Armavir Province of Armenia. It is located 8 km west of the capital Yerevan and 36 km east of the provincial centre Armavir. It has an elevation of 870 metres above sea level. The majority of the village are Armenian migrants from Iran.

The village is only 16 km away from the Armenian-Turkish border line.

== See also ==
- Armavir Province
