= Lernarot =

Lernarot Լեռնարոտ
- Location within Armenia Location within Aragatsotn
- Coordinates: 40°21′N 44°07′E
- Country: Armenia
- Province: Aragatsotn
- Municipality: Ashtarak

Population (2011)
  - Total: 308
- Time zone: UTC+4
  - Summer (DST): UTC+5

Lernarot (Armenian: Լեռնարոտ) is a village in the Ashtarak Municipality of the Aragatsotn Province of Armenia. It had a population of 308 according to the 2011 census.
