= Mrgashen =

Mrgashen Մրգաշեն
- Location within Armenia
- Coordinates: 40°17′06″N 44°32′32″E
- Country: Armenia
- Marz (Province): Kotayk
- Founded: 1950/March 1960

Area
  - Total: 10.97 km^{2} (4.24 sq mi)
- Elevation: 1,280 m (4,200 ft)

Population (2011)
  - Total: 1,933
  - Density: 176.2/km^{2} (456.4/sq mi)
- Time zone: UTC+4 ( )

Mrgashen (Armenian: Մրգաշեն; until 1964, "the village attached to Sovkhoz No. 36") is a village in the Kotayk Province of Armenia. It is located along the left bank of the Arzni-Shamiram aqueduct. Mrgashen was officially founded in March 1960 around the state-owned collective farm, or Sovkhoz No. 6. The local economy is highly dependent on agriculture, based primarily on orchard cultivation and pig or cattle breeding. The community currently has a school, kindergarten, house of culture (seating for 300), medical station (with six employees), and a library. Sixty percent of households receive natural gas, and drinking water for the village comes from the Arzakan-Yerevan network, while water for irrigation comes from the Arzni-Shamiram aqueduct.

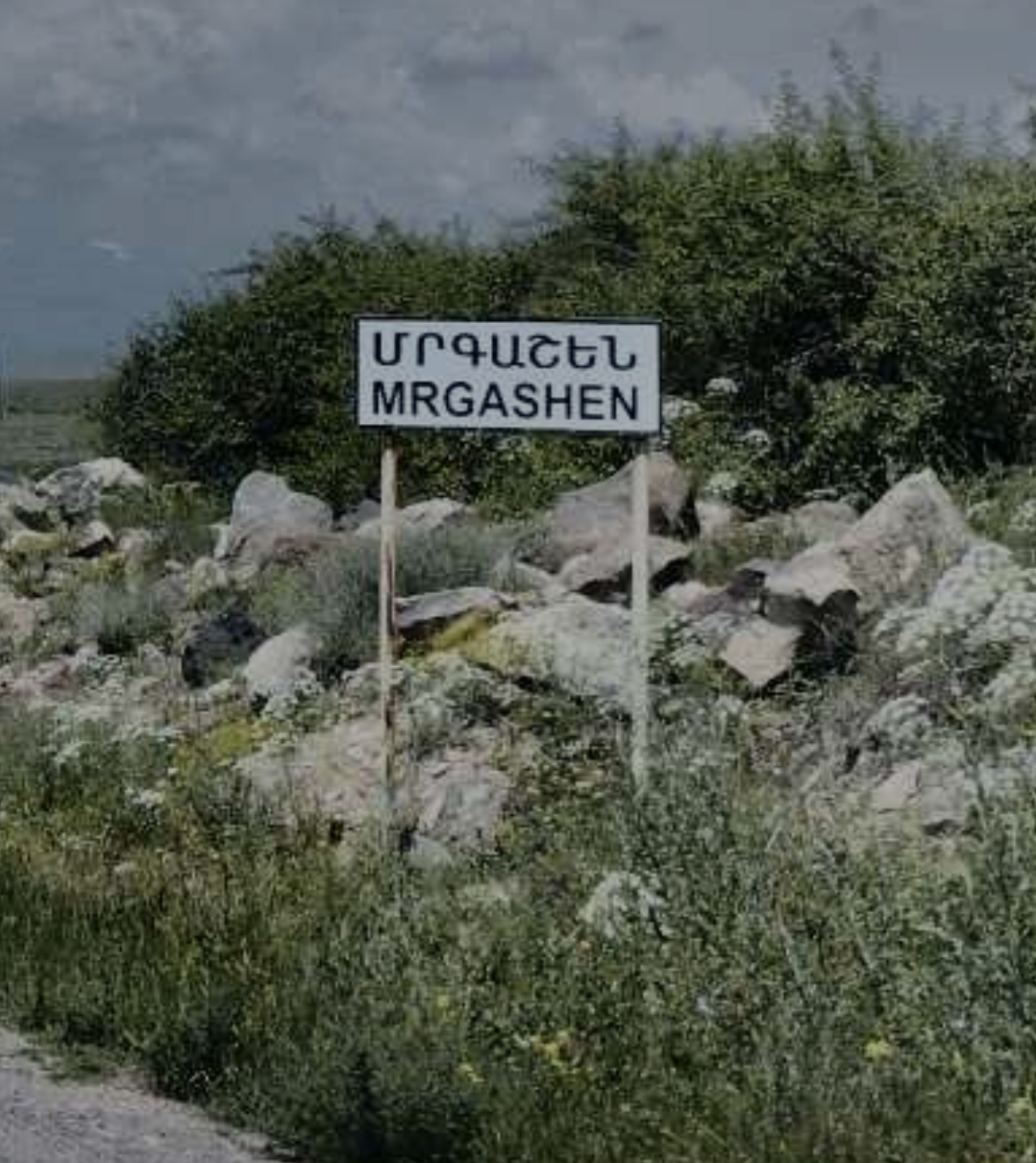

== See also ==
- Kotayk Province
