= Mets Sariar =

Village in Shirak, Armenia

Mets Sariar Մեծ Սարիար
- Location within Armenia Location within Shirak
- Coordinates: 40°53′36″N 43°57′09″E
- Country: Armenia
- Province: Shirak
- Municipality: Akhuryan

Population (2011)
  - Total: 335
- Time zone: UTC+4
  - Summer (DST): UTC+5

Mets Sariar (Armenian: Մեծ Սարիար) is a village in the Akhuryan Municipality of the Shirak Province of Armenia.

== Demographics ==
Historical population
Year	Pop.	±% p.a.
1831	217	—
1873	476	+1.89%
1897	609	+1.03%
1926	527	−0.50%
1931	570	+1.58%
1939	598	+0.60%
1959	633	+0.28%
1970	424	−3.58%
1979	395	−0.78%
1989	180	−7.56%
2001	379	+6.40%
2011	335	−1.23%
