= Shenavan, Lori =

Shenavan Շենավան
- Location within Armenia
- Coordinates: 40°52′N 44°14′E
- Country: Armenia
- Marz (Province): Lori
- Elevation: 1,700 m (5,600 ft)

Population (2011)
  - Total: 402
- Time zone: UTC+4 ( )
  - Summer (DST): UTC+5 ( )

Shenavan (Armenian: Շենավան) is a town in the Lori Province of Armenia.
