= Haykavan, Shirak =

Haykavan Հայկավան
- Location within Armenia Location within Shirak
- Coordinates: 40°45′21″N 43°46′12″E
- Country: Armenia
- Province: Shirak
- Municipality: Akhuryan

Population (2011)
  - Total: 1,107
- Time zone: UTC+4

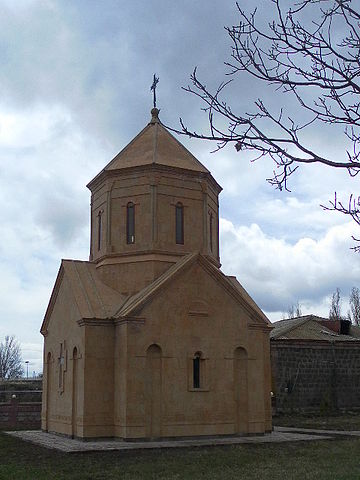
Holy Cross Gospel Church of Haykavan

Haykavan (Armenian: Հայկավան) is a village in the Akhuryan Municipality of the Shirak Province of Armenia.

== Demographics ==
Historical population
Year	Pop.	±% p.a.
1886	391	—
1897	543	+3.03%
1926	1,042	+2.27%
1939	1,353	+2.03%
1959	1,398	+0.16%
1970	1,410	+0.08%
1979	1,348	−0.50%
1989	1,482	+0.95%
2001	1,419	−0.36%
2011	1,107	−2.45%
