= Aghin kayaran =

Aghin kayaran Աղին կայարան
- Location within Armenia Location within Shirak
- Coordinates: 40°36′24″N 43°42′54″E
- Country: Armenia
- Province: Shirak

Population (2011)
  - Total: 72
- Time zone: UTC+4

Aghin kayaran (Armenian: Աղին կայարան) is a village in the Shirak Province of Armenia. It is located on left bank of the Akhurian River, 1 km (0.62 mi) south-west from the village of Aghin.

== Demographics ==
The population of the village since 1926 is as follows:

Year	Population
1926	60
1939	108
1959	184
1970	185
1979	140
2001	73
2011	72
