= Pokr Sariar =

Pokr Sariar Փոքր Սարիար
- Location within Armenia Location within Shirak
- Coordinates: 40°55′33″N 44°01′07″E
- Country: Armenia
- Province: Shirak
- Municipality: Ashotsk

Population (2011)
  - Total: 241
- Time zone: UTC+4
  - Summer (DST): UTC+5

Pokr Sariar (Armenian: Փոքր Սարիար) is a village in the Ashotsk Municipality of the Shirak Province of Armenia. The village was populated by Armenians and Azerbaijanis before the exodus of Azerbaijanis from Armenia after the outbreak of the Nagorno-Karabakh conflict.

== Demographics ==
Historical population
Year	Pop.	±% p.a.
1831	280	—
1897	384	+0.48%
1926	255	−1.40%
1931	384	+8.53%
1939	510	+3.61%
1959	387	−1.37%
1970	377	−0.24%
1979	283	−3.14%
1989	169	−5.02%
2001	266	+3.85%
2011	241	−0.98%
