= Medovka =

Medovka Մեդովկա
- Location within Armenia
- Coordinates: 41°07′22″N 44°20′44″E
- Country: Armenia
- Marz (Province): Lori
- Elevation: 1,550 m (5,090 ft)

Population (2011)
  - Total: 350
- Time zone: UTC+4 ( )
  - Summer (DST): UTC+5

Medovka (Armenian: Մեդովկա), is a village in the Lori Province of Armenia. It belongs to the municipality of Tumanyan.
