= Antaramut =

Village in Lori, Armenia

Antaramut Անտառամուտ
- Location within Armenia
- Coordinates: 40°56′19″N 44°33′33″E
- Country: Armenia
- Province: Lori

Area
  - Total: 5.49 km^{2} (2.12 sq mi)
- Elevation: 1,300 m (4,300 ft)

Population (2011)
  - Total: 306
- Time zone: UTC+4 (AMT)

Antaramut (Armenian: Անտառամուտ) is a village in the Lori Province of Armenia.

== Toponymy ==
The village was previously known as Kolagiran (Armenian: Քոլագիրան).
