= Khotanan =

Khotanan may refer to:

- Nerkin Khotanan, Armenia
- Verin Khotanan, Armenia
