= Bekdash =

Bekdash may refer to:

- Garabogaz, Turkmenistan - formerly Bekdash
- Khordzor, Armenia - formerly Bekdash
