= Vardavank =

Vardavank Վարդավանք
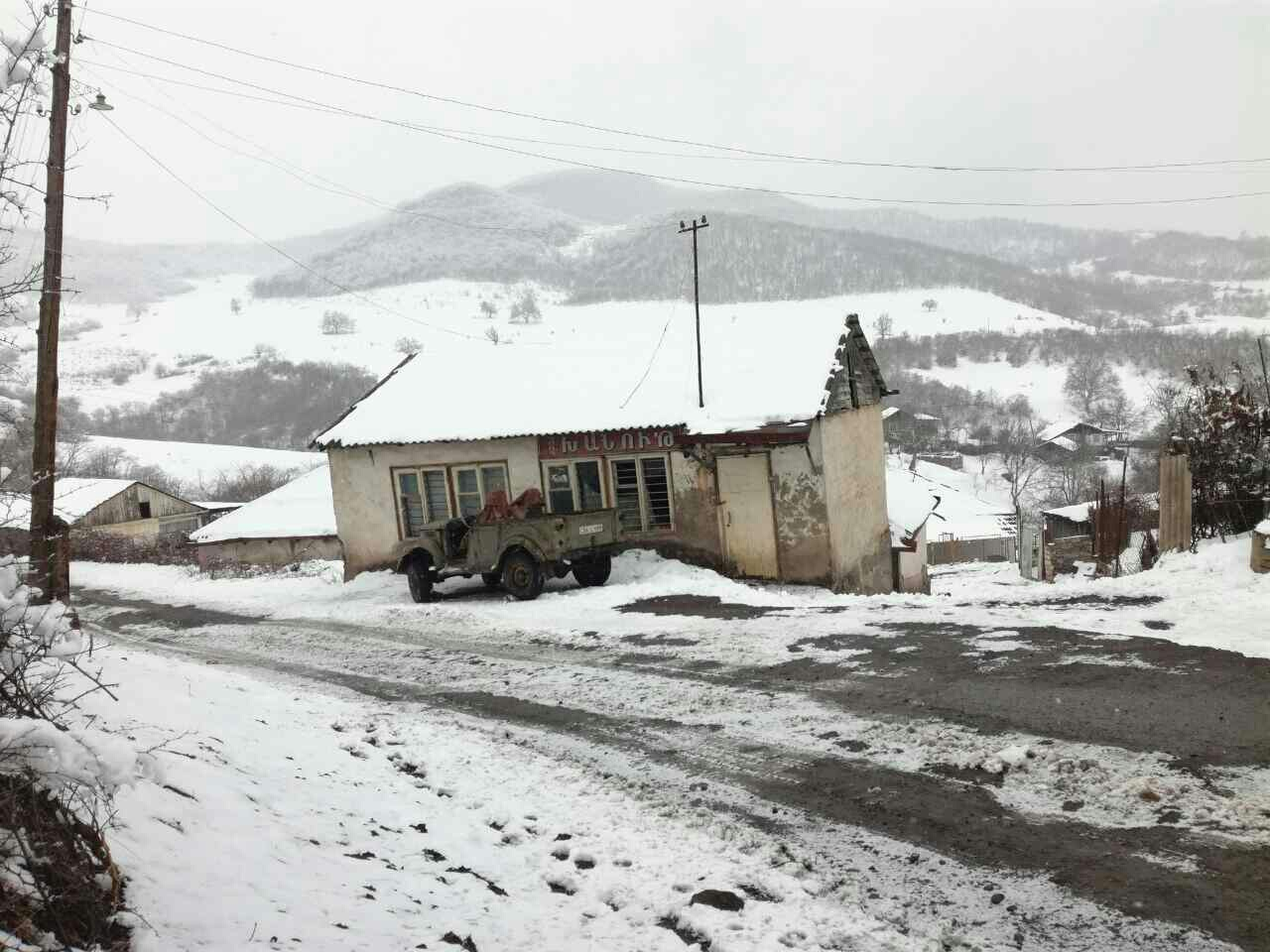

- Location within Armenia Location within Syunik Province
- Coordinates: 39°14′N 46°30′E
- Country: Armenia
- Province: Syunik
- Municipality: Kapan

Area
  - Total: 6.76 km^{2} (2.61 sq mi)

Population (2011)
  - Total: 100
  - Density: 15/km^{2} (38/sq mi)
- Time zone: UTC+4 (AMT)

Vardavank (Armenian: Վարդավանք) is a village in the Kapan Municipality of the Syunik Province in Armenia.

== Demographics ==
The Statistical Committee of Armenia reported its population was 91 in 2010, down from 120 at the 2001 census.
