= Khdrants =

Khdrants Խդրանց
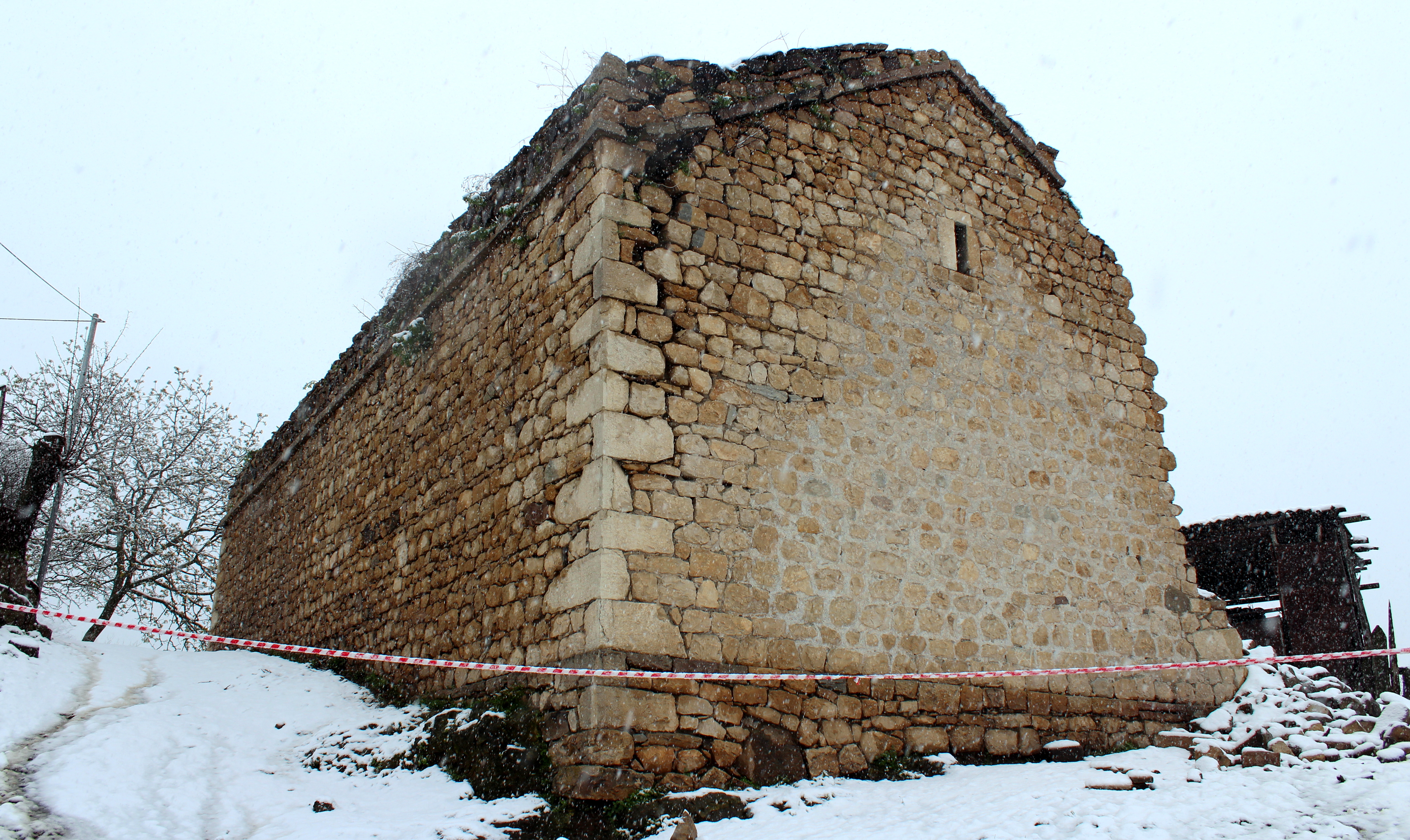
- A church in Khdrants

- Location within Armenia Location within Syunik Province
- Coordinates: 39°13′26″N 46°31′44″E
- Country: Armenia
- Province: Syunik
- Municipality: Kapan

Area
  - Total: 6.58 km^{2} (2.54 sq mi)

Population (2011)
  - Total: 48
  - Density: 7.3/km^{2} (19/sq mi)
- Time zone: UTC+4 (AMT)

Khdrants (Armenian: Խդրանց) is a village in the Kapan Municipality of the Syunik Province in Armenia.

== Etymology ==
The village is also known as Khdran, Khndrats’i and Khotorants’ and has previously been known as Sirkatag, Sirbat’as, Surbyadag, Sirkat’as, and Tsakghadzor.

== Demographics ==
The Statistical Committee of Armenia reported its population as 55 in 2010, down from 68 at the 2001 census.
