= Norashenik =

Norashenik Նորաշենիկ
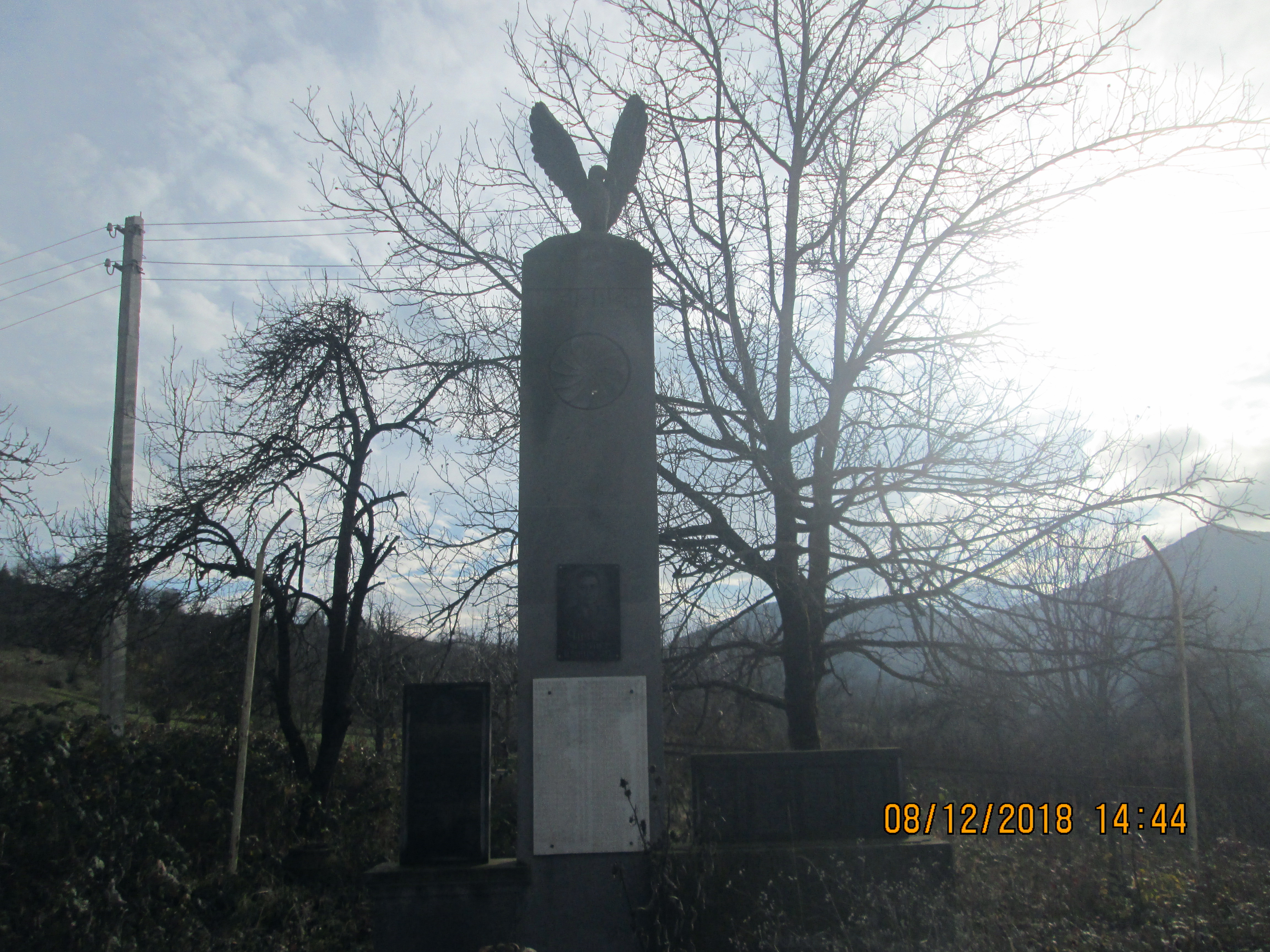
- WWII monument in Norashenik

- Location within Armenia Location within Syunik Province
- Coordinates: 39°16′03″N 46°23′27″E
- Country: Armenia
- Province: Syunik
- Municipality: Kapan

Area
  - Total: 9.16 km^{2} (3.54 sq mi)

Population (2011)
  - Total: 128
  - Density: 14.0/km^{2} (36.2/sq mi)
- Time zone: UTC+4 (AMT)

Norashenik (Armenian: Նորաշենիկ) is a village in the Kapan Municipality of the Syunik Province in Armenia.

== Demographics ==
The Statistical Committee of Armenia reported its population was 118 in 2010, down from 158 at the 2001 census.
