= Shrvenants =

Shrvenants Շրվենանց
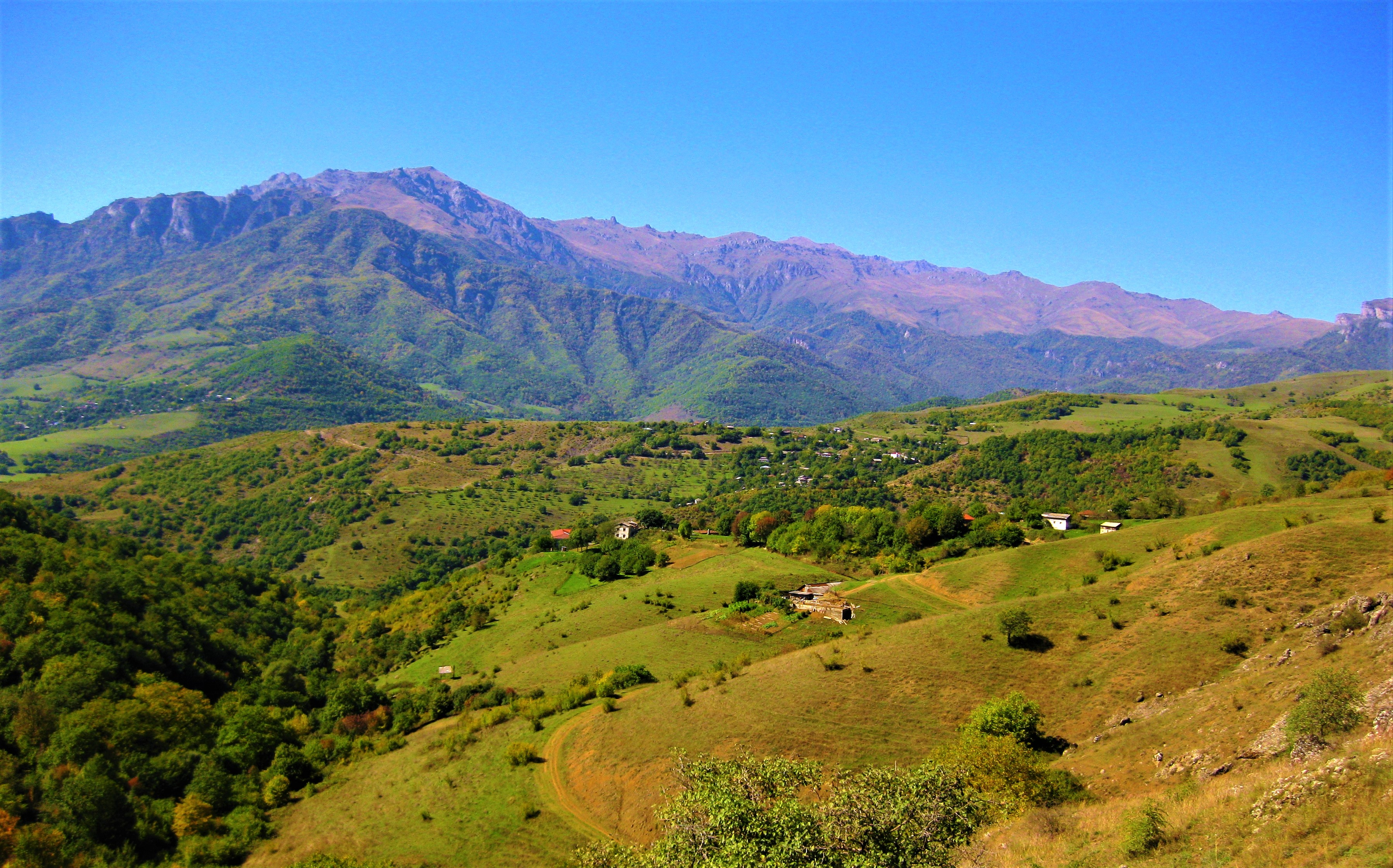

- Location within Armenia Location within Syunik Province
- Coordinates: 39°17′00″N 46°23′29″E
- Country: Armenia
- Province: Syunik
- Municipality: Kapan

Area
  - Total: 5.83 km^{2} (2.25 sq mi)

Population (2011)
  - Total: 76
  - Density: 13/km^{2} (34/sq mi)
- Time zone: UTC+4 (AMT)

Shrvenants (Armenian: Շրվենանց) is a village in the Kapan Municipality of the Syunik Province in Armenia.

== Etymology ==
The village was previously known as Daymadaglu.

== Demographics ==
The Statistical Committee of Armenia reported its population was 76 in 2010, up from 72 at the 2001 census.

== Gallery ==
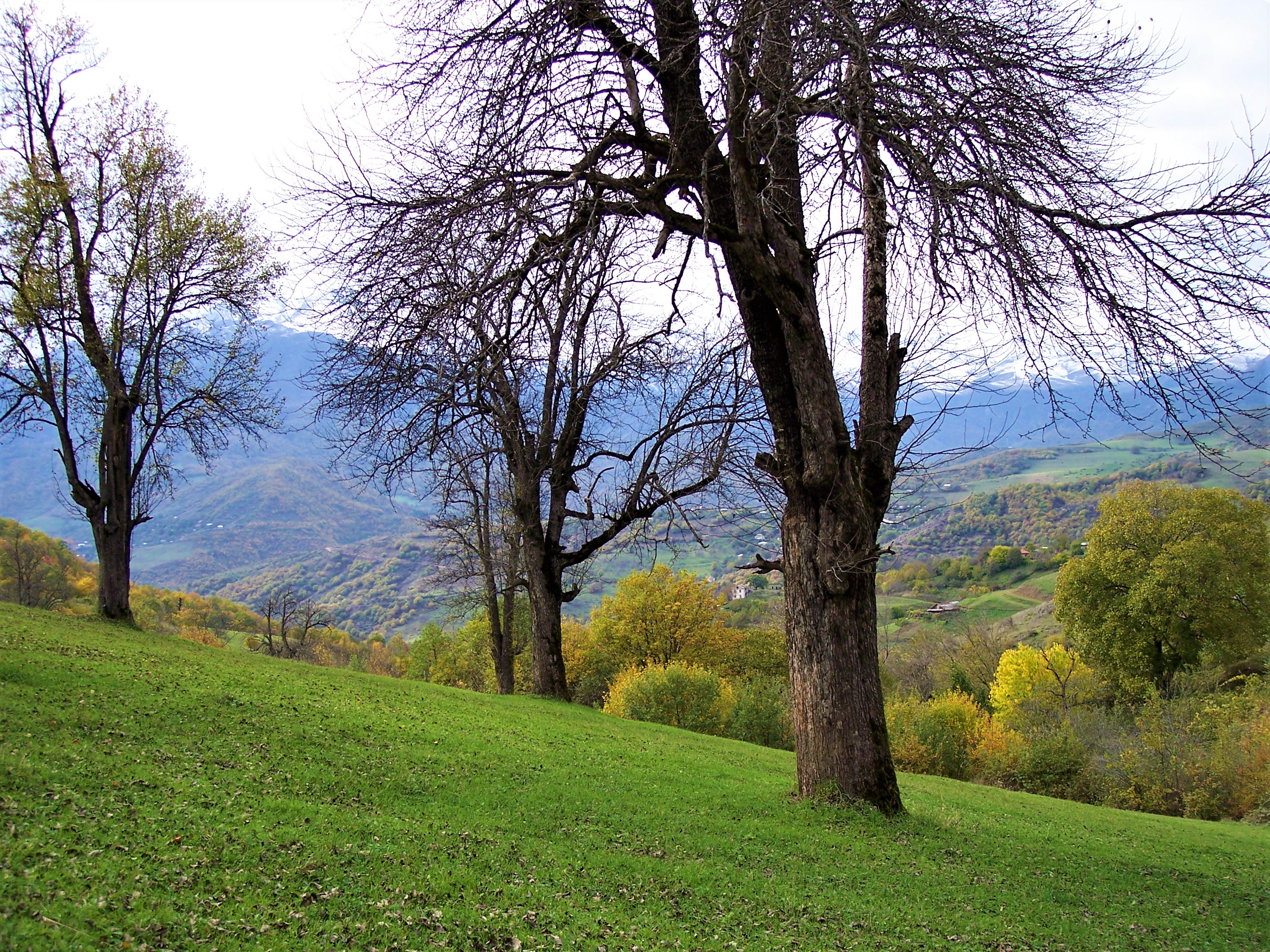

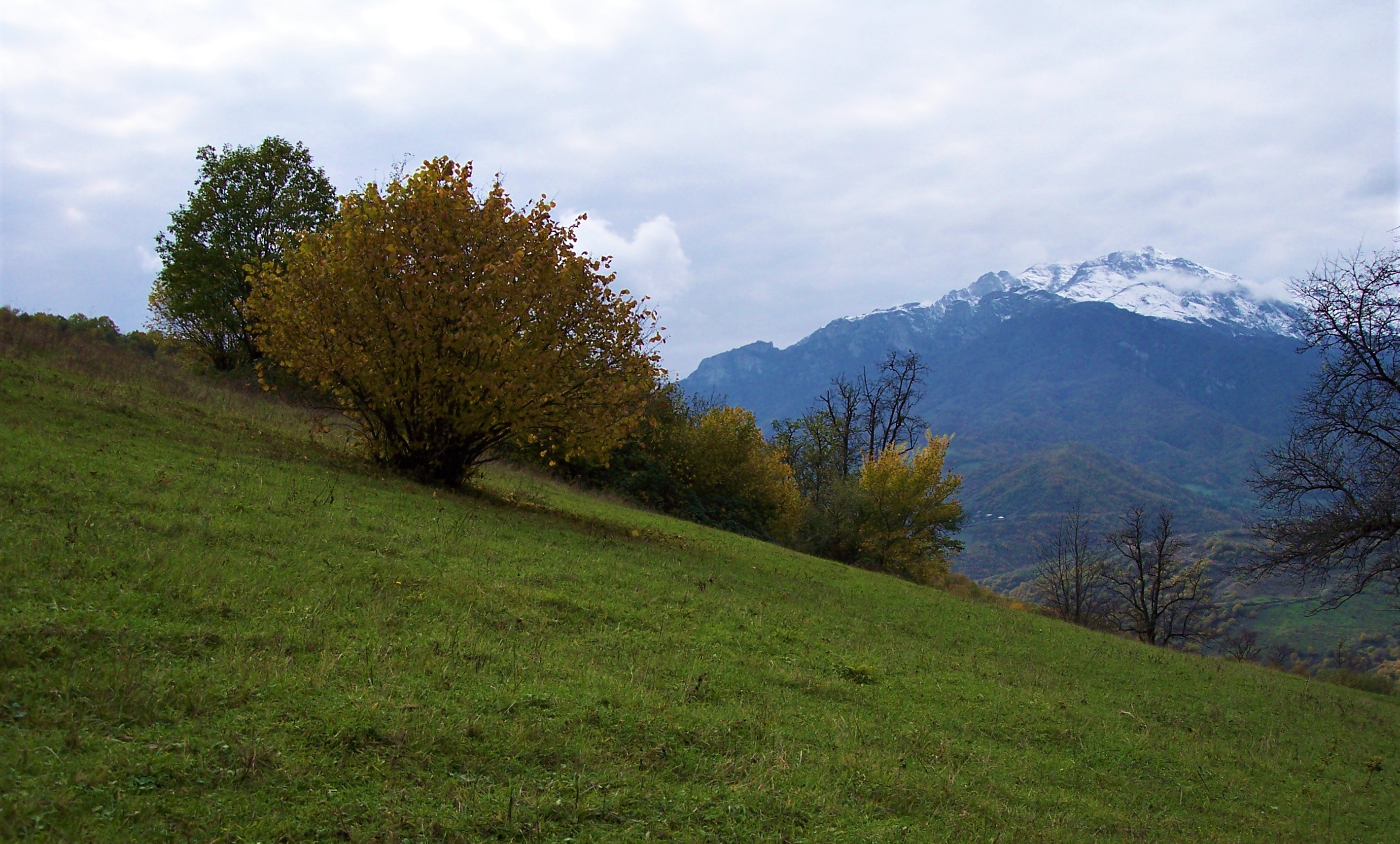

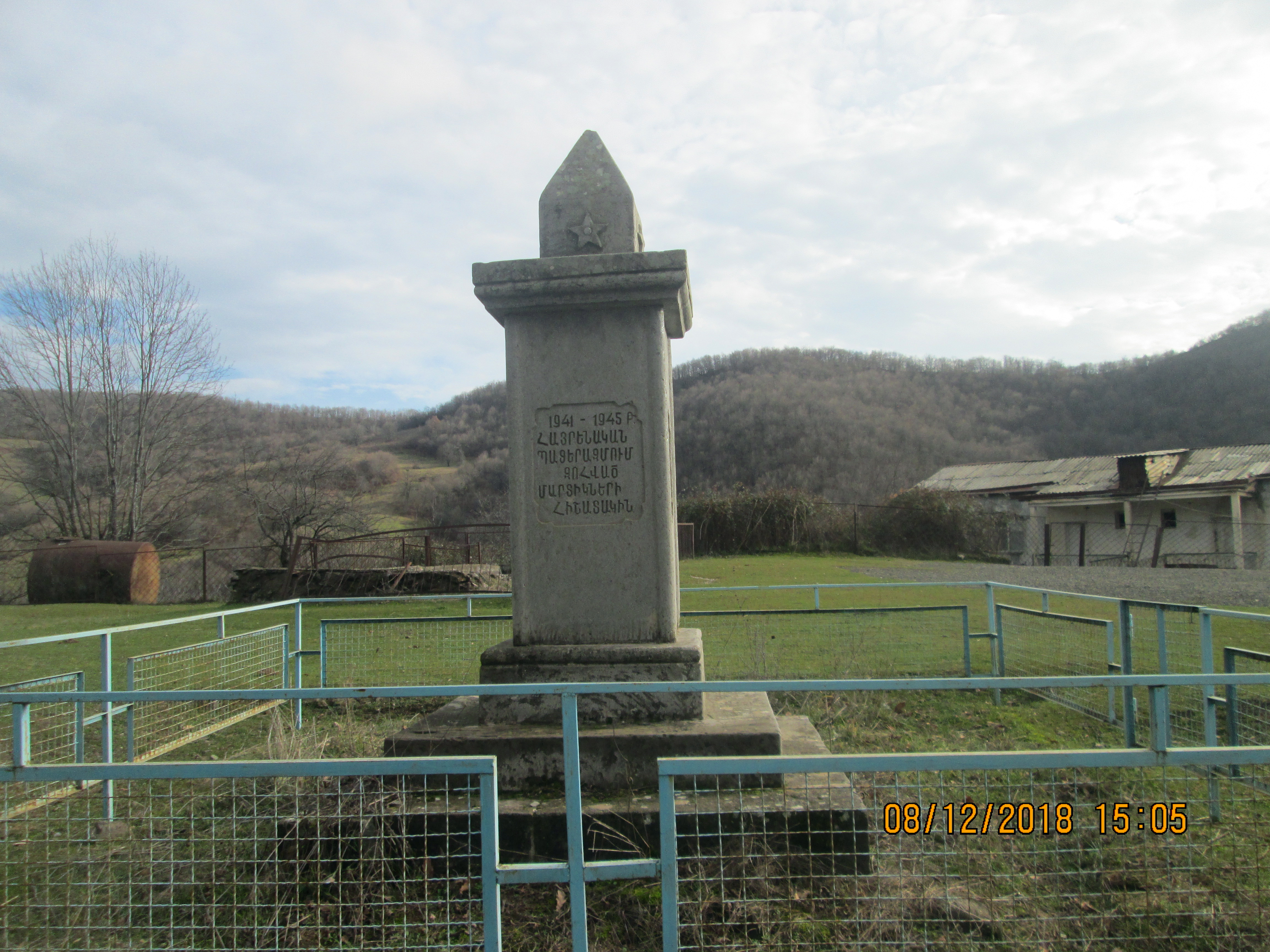
WWII memorial

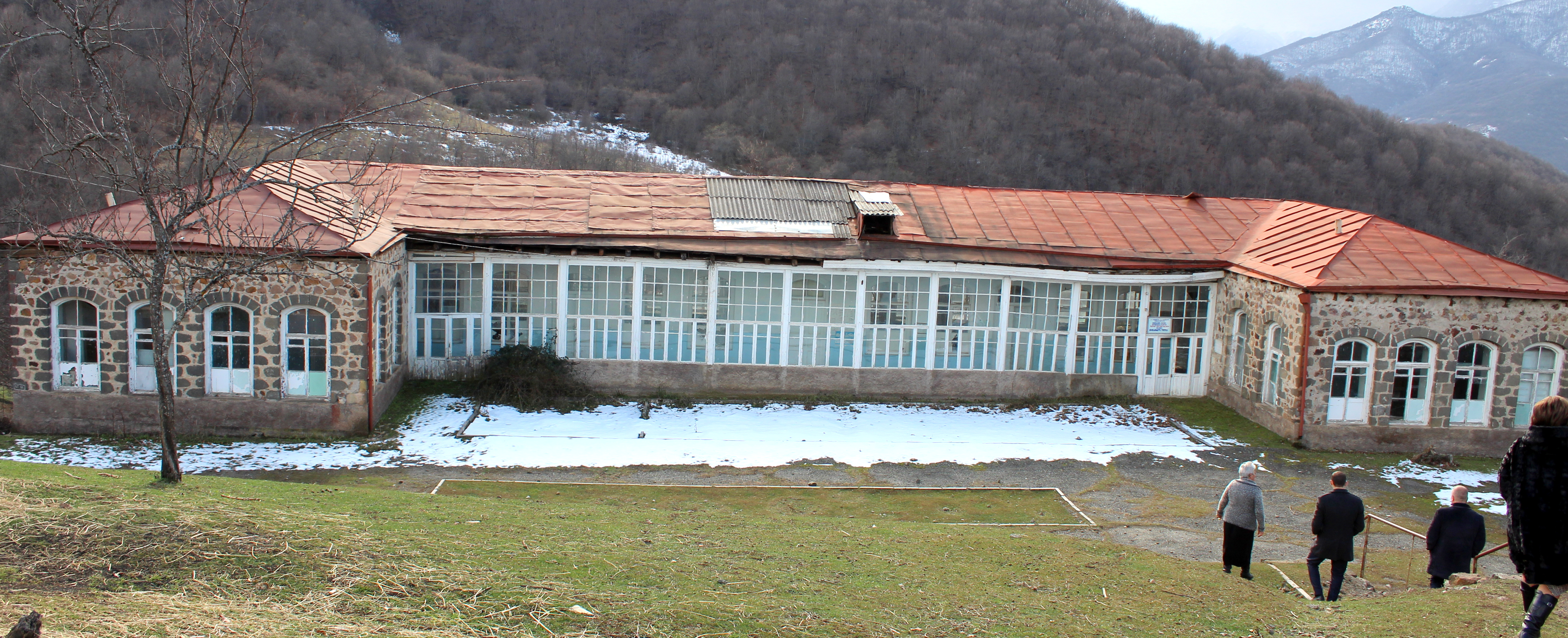
Village school

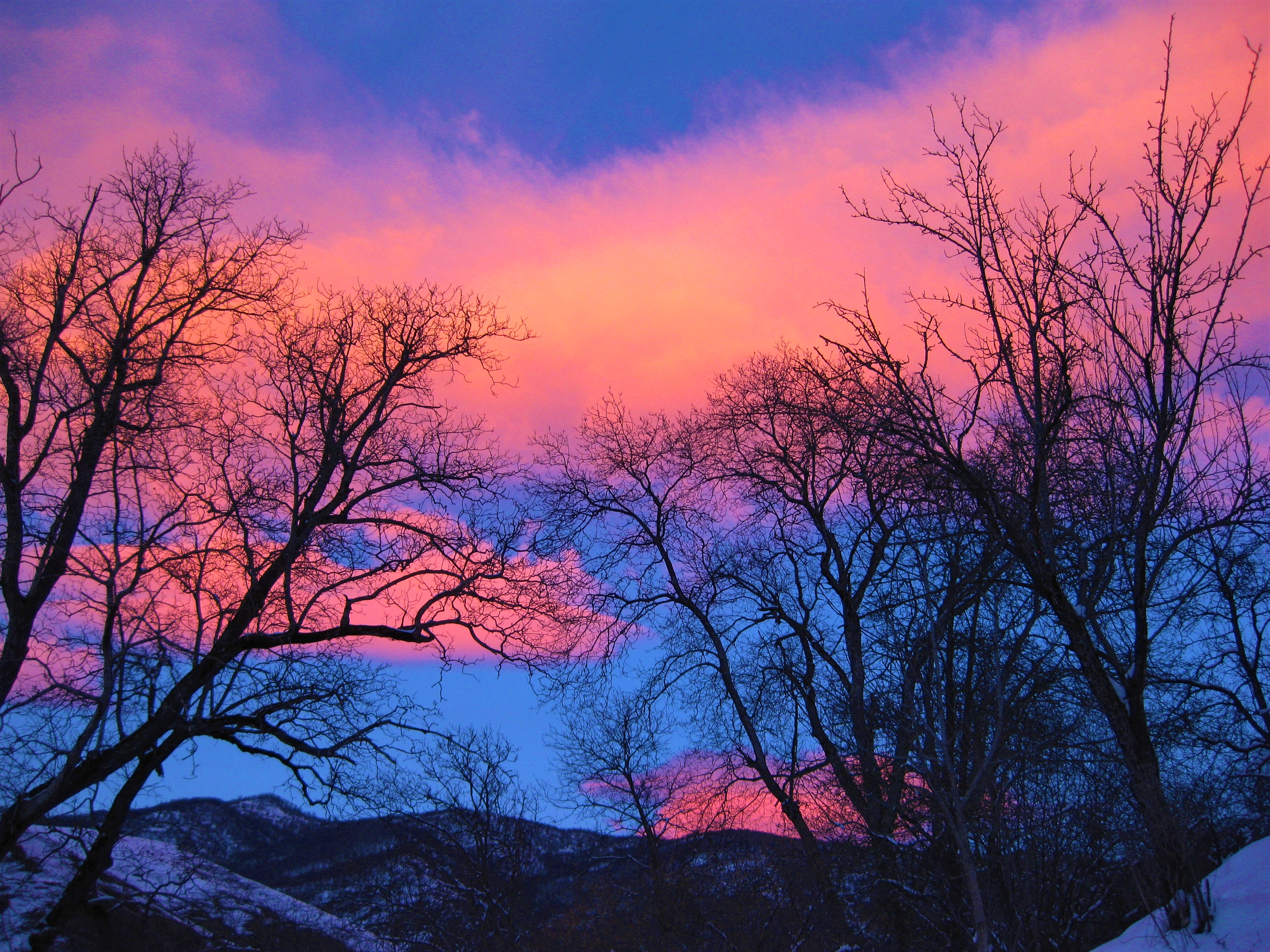
