= Uzhanis =

Uzhanis Ուժանիս
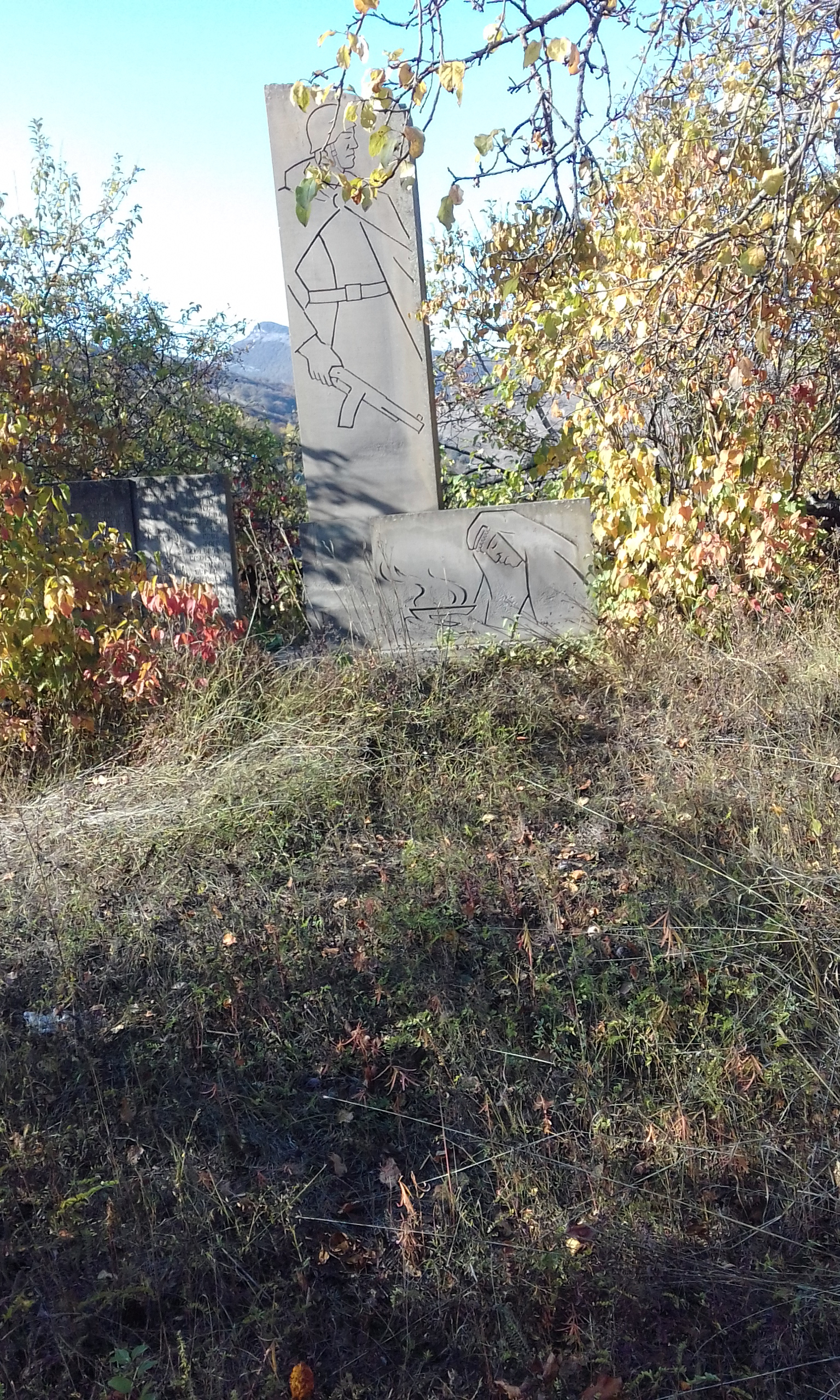
- WWII monument in Uzhanis

- Location within Armenia Location within Syunik Province
- Coordinates: 39°14′08″N 46°32′31″E
- Country: Armenia
- Province: Syunik
- Municipality: Kapan

Area
  - Total: 10.46 km^{2} (4.04 sq mi)

Population (2011)
  - Total: 59
  - Density: 5.6/km^{2} (15/sq mi)
- Time zone: UTC+4 (AMT)

Uzhanis (Armenian: Ուժանիս) is a village in the Kapan Municipality of the Syunik Province in Armenia, near the border of Azerbaijan.

== Demographics ==
The Statistical Committee of Armenia reported its population was 87 in 2010, down from 136 at the 2001 census.
