= Vanek, Armenia =

Vanek Վանեք
- Location within Armenia Location within Syunik Province
- Coordinates: 39°17′N 46°21′E
- Country: Armenia
- Province: Syunik
- Municipality: Kapan

Area
  - Total: 2.06 km^{2} (0.80 sq mi)

Population (2011)
  - Total: 61
  - Density: 30/km^{2} (77/sq mi)
- Time zone: UTC+4 (AMT)

Vanek (Armenian: Վանեք) is a village in the Kapan Municipality of the Syunik Province in Armenia.

== Demographics ==
The Statistical Committee of Armenia reported its population was 71 in 2010, down from 83 at the 2001 census.
