= Chapni =

Chapni Չափնի
- Location within Armenia Location within Syunik Province
- Coordinates: 39°16′01″N 46°27′29″E
- Country: Armenia
- Province: Syunik
- Municipality: Kapan

Area
  - Total: 2.69 km^{2} (1.04 sq mi)

Population (2011)
  - Total: 112
  - Density: 41.6/km^{2} (108/sq mi)
- Time zone: UTC+4 (AMT)

Chapni (Armenian: Չափնի) is a village in the Kapan Municipality of the Syunik Province in Armenia.

== Demographics ==
The Statistical Committee of Armenia reported its population was 56 in 2010, down from 126 at the 2001 census.
