= Gomaran =

Gomaran Գոմարան
- Location within Armenia Location within Syunik Province
- Coordinates: 39°10′55″N 46°24′50″E
- Country: Armenia
- Province: Syunik
- Municipality: Kapan

Population (2011)
  - Total: 71
- Time zone: UTC+4 (AMT)

Gomaran (Armenian: Գոմարան) is a village in the Kapan Municipality of the Syunik Province in Armenia.

== Demographics ==
The Statistical Committee of Armenia reported its population as 76 at the 2001 census.
