= Achanan =

Achanan Աճանան
- Location within Armenia Location within Syunik Province
- Coordinates: 39°14′05″N 46°25′53″E
- Country: Armenia
- Province: Syunik
- Municipality: Kapan

Area
  - Total: 7.64 km^{2} (2.95 sq mi)

Population (2011)
  - Total: 164
  - Density: 21.5/km^{2} (55.6/sq mi)
- Time zone: UTC+4 (AMT)

Achanan (Armenian: Աճանան) is a village in the Kapan Municipality of the Syunik Province in Armenia. In 1988-1989 Armenian refugees from Azerbaijan settled in the village.

There is a building inside the village constructed in 695 AD, with an inscription in Persian testifying to the year of construction and incorporating parts of the Koran. The inclusion of the Koran indicates the building's prior use as an Islamic holy place, but in modern history both Azerbaijani and Armenian residents of the village used it only as a warehouse. The building continues to be maintained and repaired today by the local villagers.

== Demographics ==
The Statistical Committee of Armenia reported its population as 154 in 2010, down from 161 at the 2001 census.

Year	1831	1873	1897	1926	1939	1959	1979	2001	2011
Population	23	34	374	94	131	269	331	161	164
