= Chakaten =

Chakaten Ճակատեն
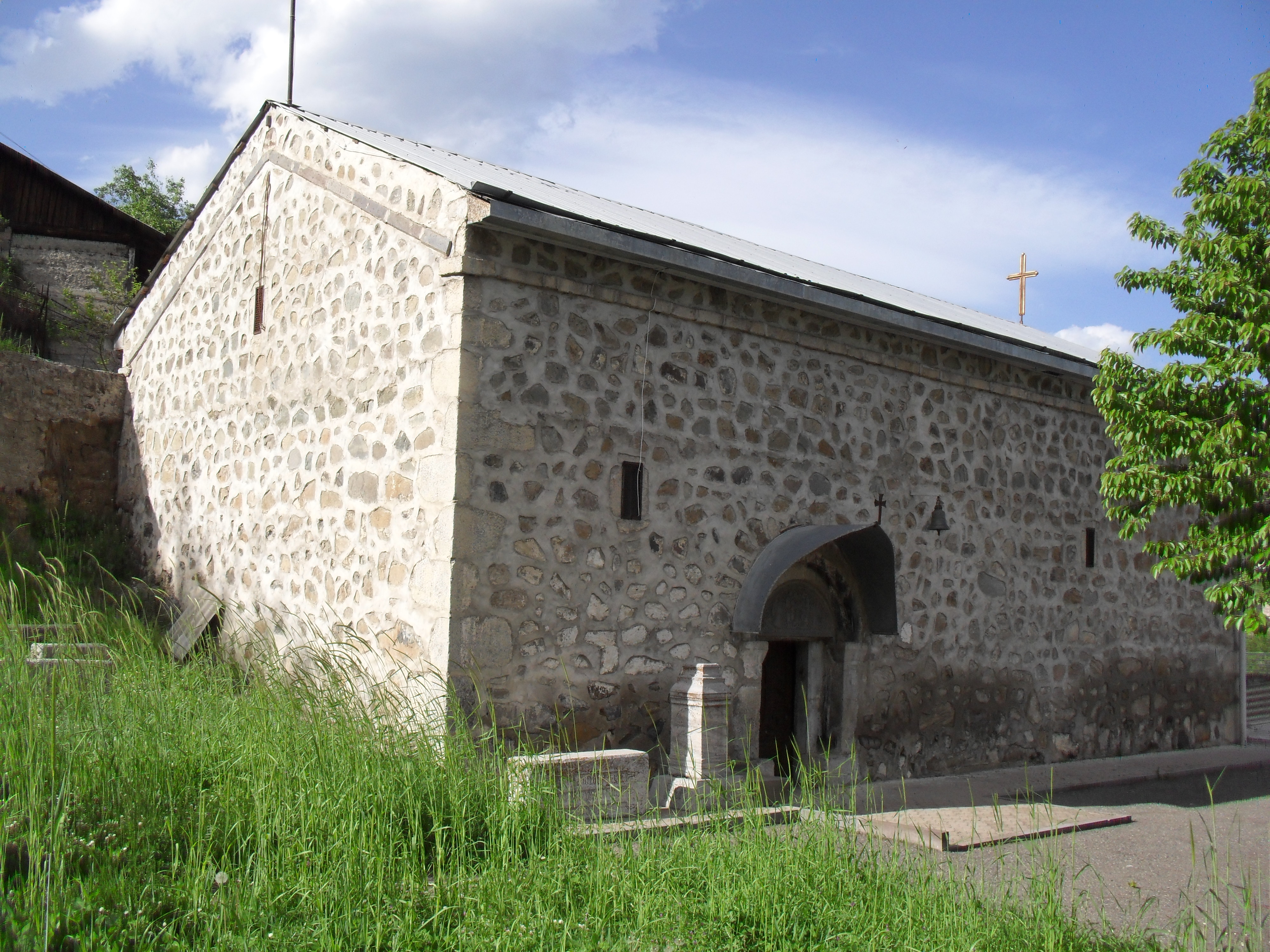
- Church in Chakaten

- Location within Armenia Location within Syunik Province
- Coordinates: 39°08′40″N 46°26′25″E
- Country: Armenia
- Province: Syunik
- Municipality: Kapan

Area
  - Total: 14.25 km^{2} (5.50 sq mi)

Population (2011)
  - Total: 131
  - Density: 9.19/km^{2} (23.8/sq mi)
- Time zone: UTC+4 (AMT)

Chakaten (Armenian: Ճակատեն) is a village in the Kapan Municipality of the Syunik Province in Armenia.

== Demographics ==
The Statistical Committee of Armenia reported its population as 137 in 2010, down from 190 at the 2001 census.

== Gallery ==
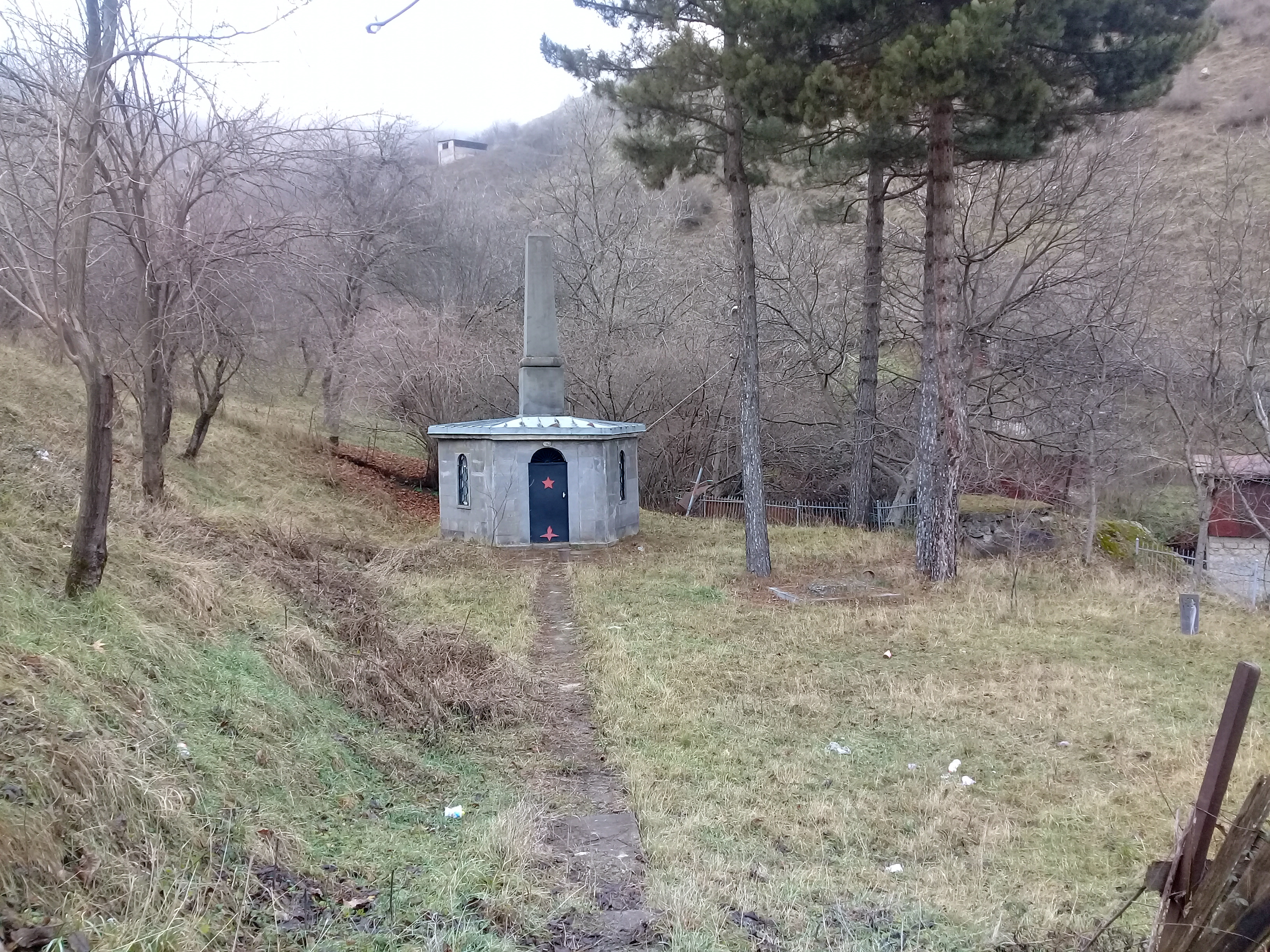
Monument

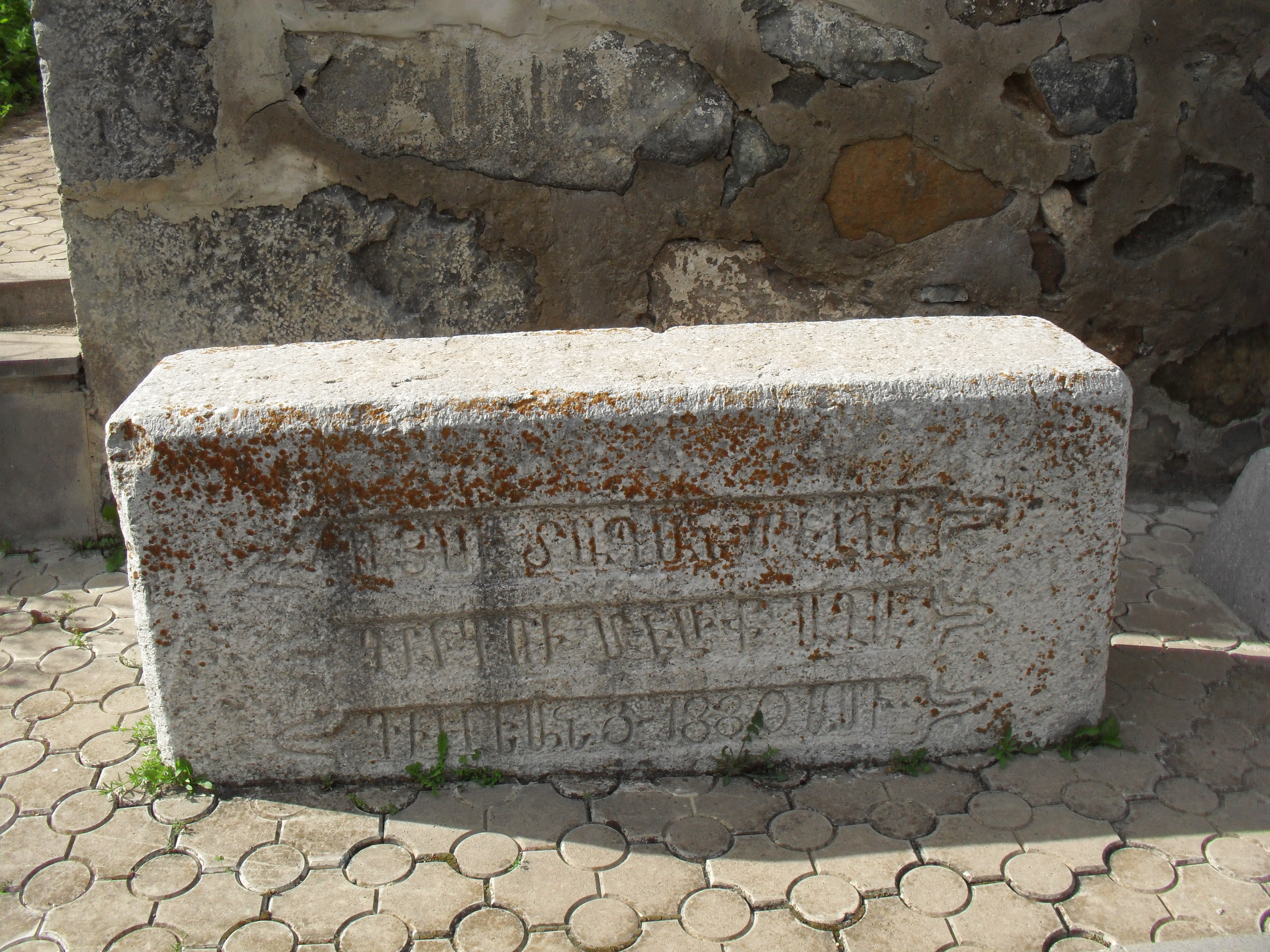
Khachkar

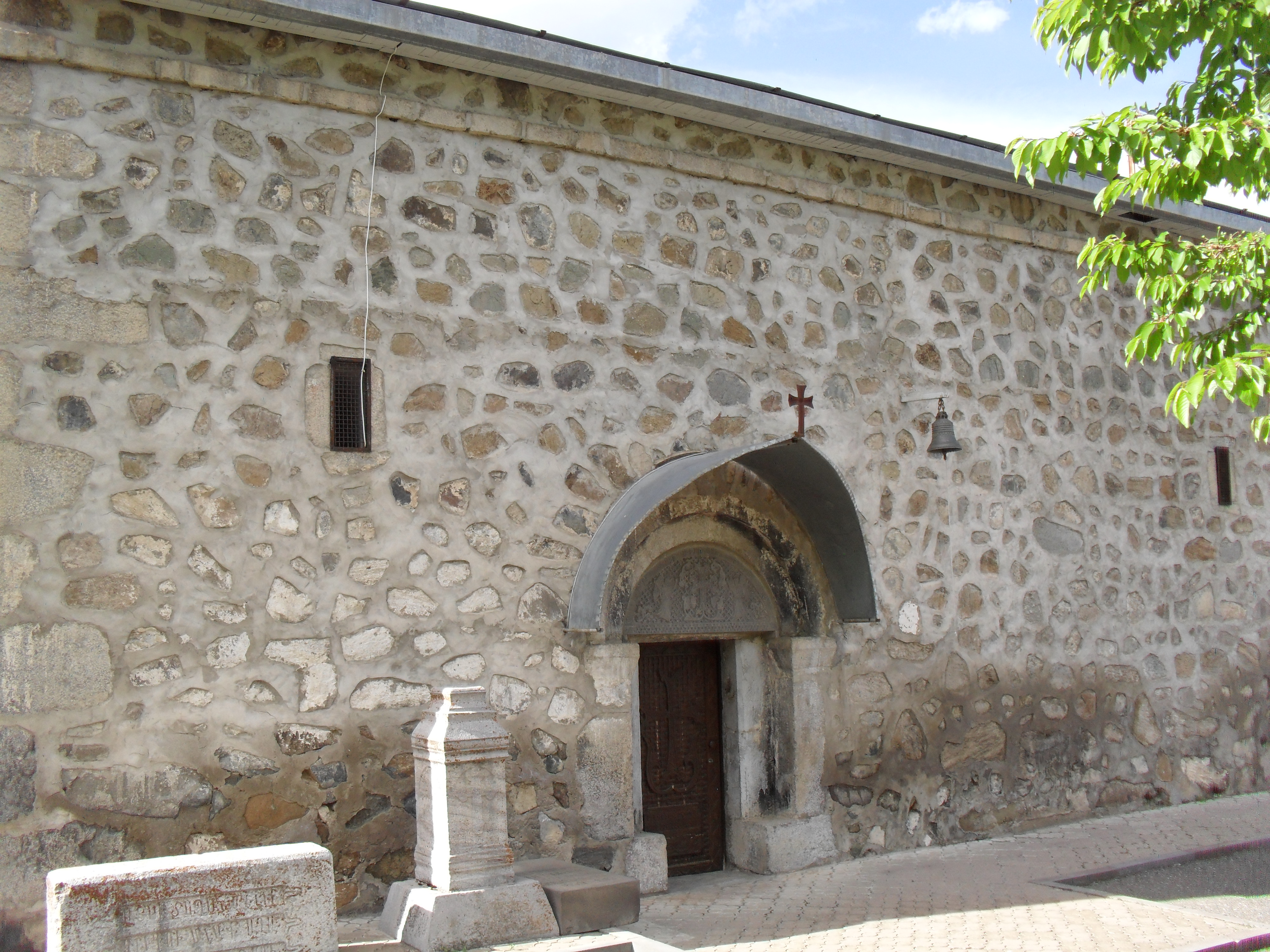
Church
