= Shishkert =

Shishkert Շիշկերտ
- Location within Armenia Location within Syunik Province
- Coordinates: 39°04′15″N 46°21′03″E
- Country: Armenia
- Province: Syunik
- Municipality: Kapan

Population (2011)
  - Total: 264
- Time zone: UTC+4 (AMT)

Shishkert (Armenian: Շիշկերտ) is a village in the Kapan Municipality of the Syunik Province in Armenia.

== Demographics ==
The Statistical Committee of Armenia reported its population as 342 at the 2001 census.
