= Srashen =

Srashen Սրաշեն
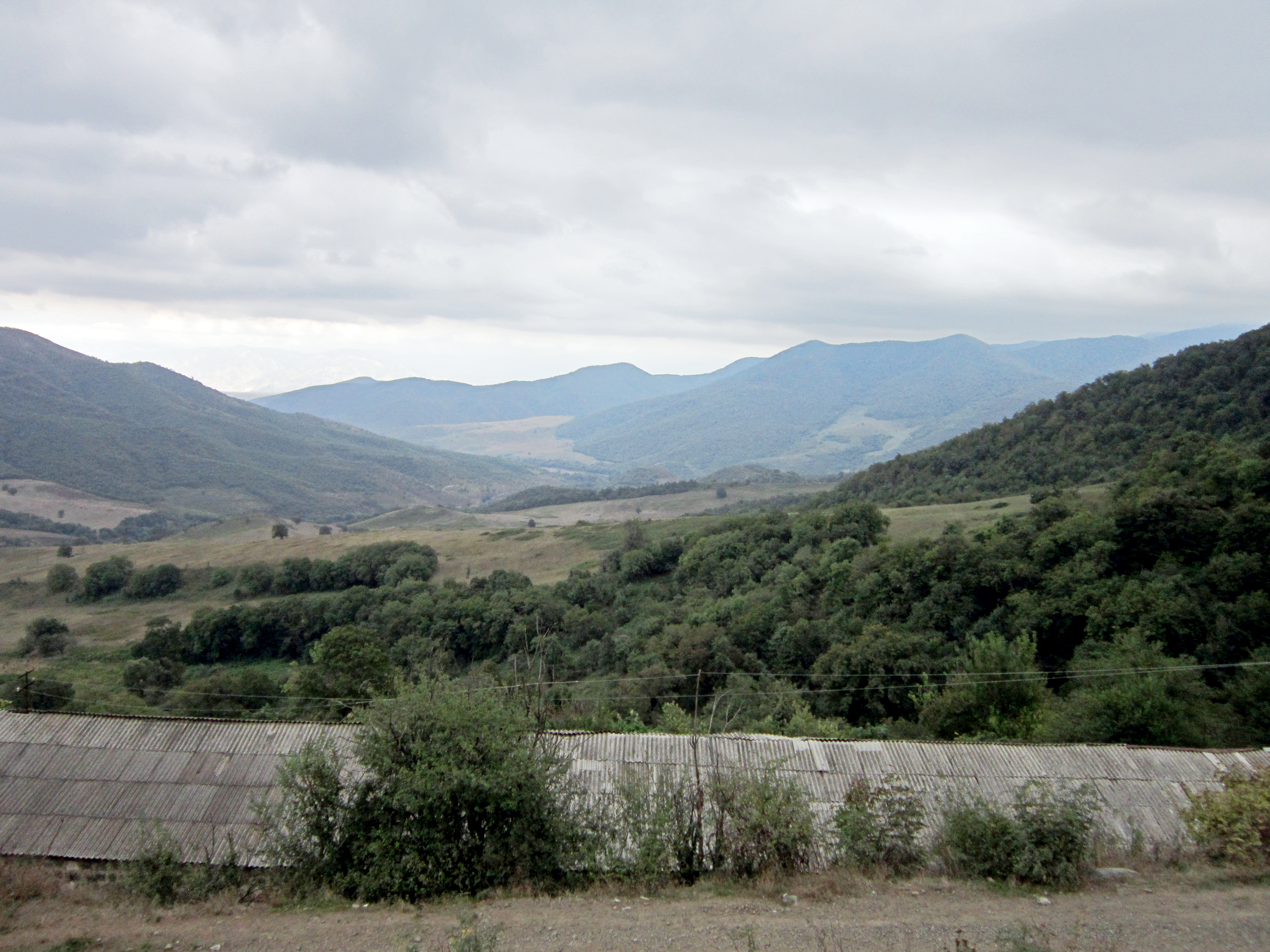

- Location within Armenia Location within Syunik Province
- Coordinates: 39°04′44″N 46°29′37″E
- Country: Armenia
- Province: Syunik
- Municipality: Kapan

Area
  - Total: 8.88 km^{2} (3.43 sq mi)

Population (2011)
  - Total: 90
  - Density: 10/km^{2} (26/sq mi)
- Time zone: UTC+4 (AMT)

Srashen (Armenian: Սրաշեն) is a village in the Kapan Municipality of the Syunik Province in Armenia.

== Etymology ==
The village was previously known as Kilisakend.

== Demographics ==
The Statistical Committee of Armenia reported its population was 91 in 2010, down from 105 at the 2001 census.

== Gallery ==
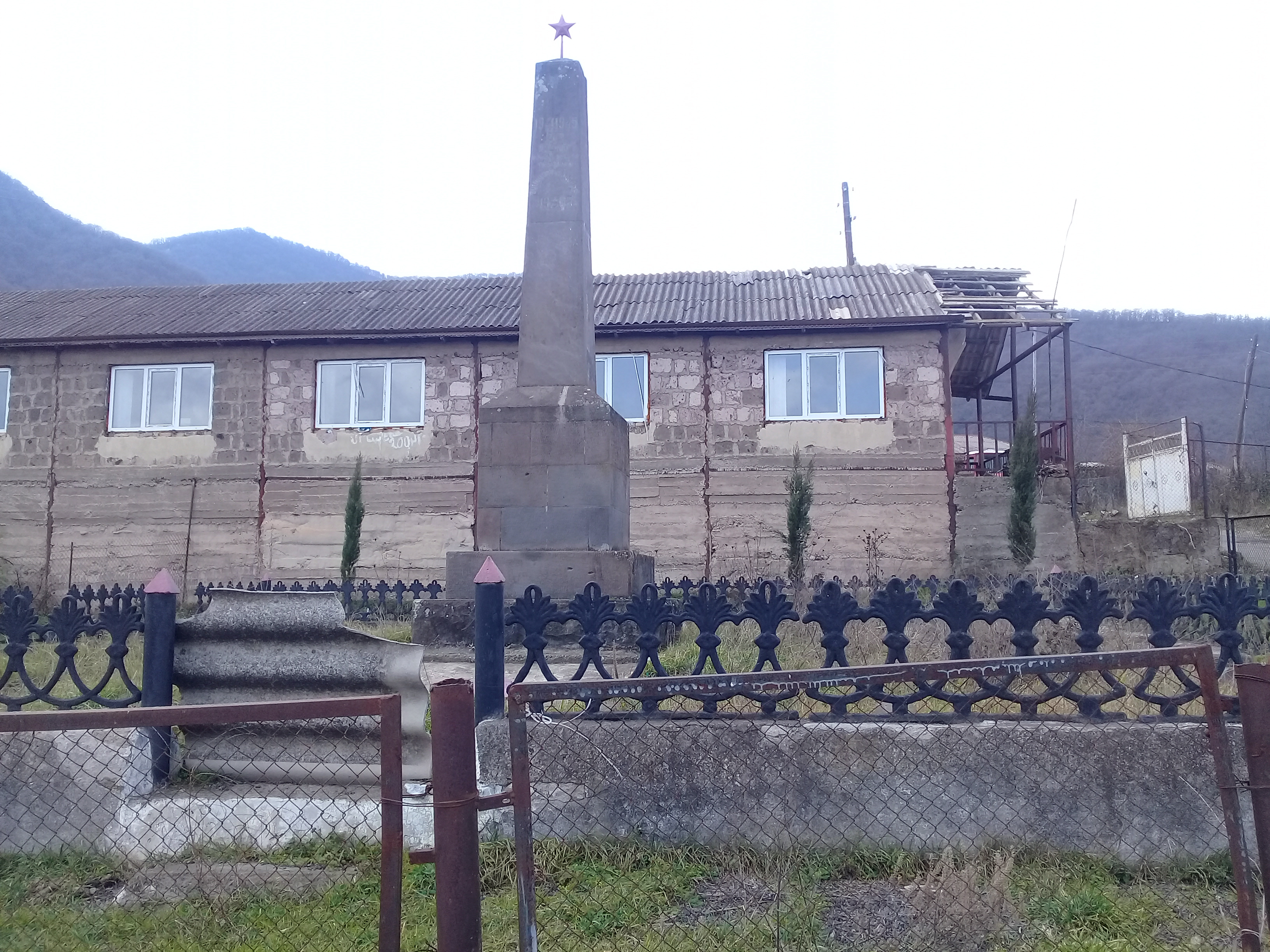
WWII monument

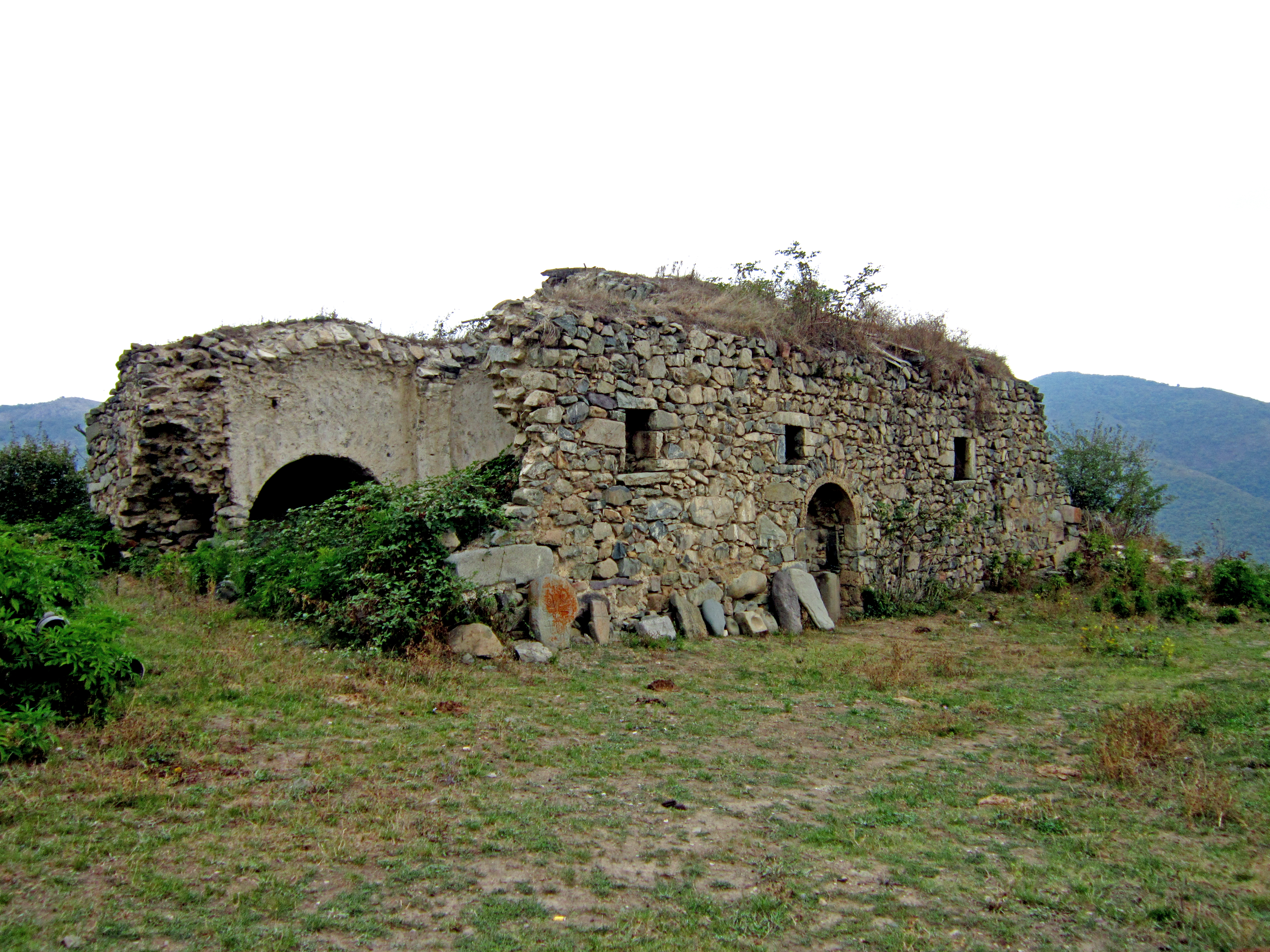
Surb Hripsime Church
