= Tandzaver =

Tandzaver Տանձավեր
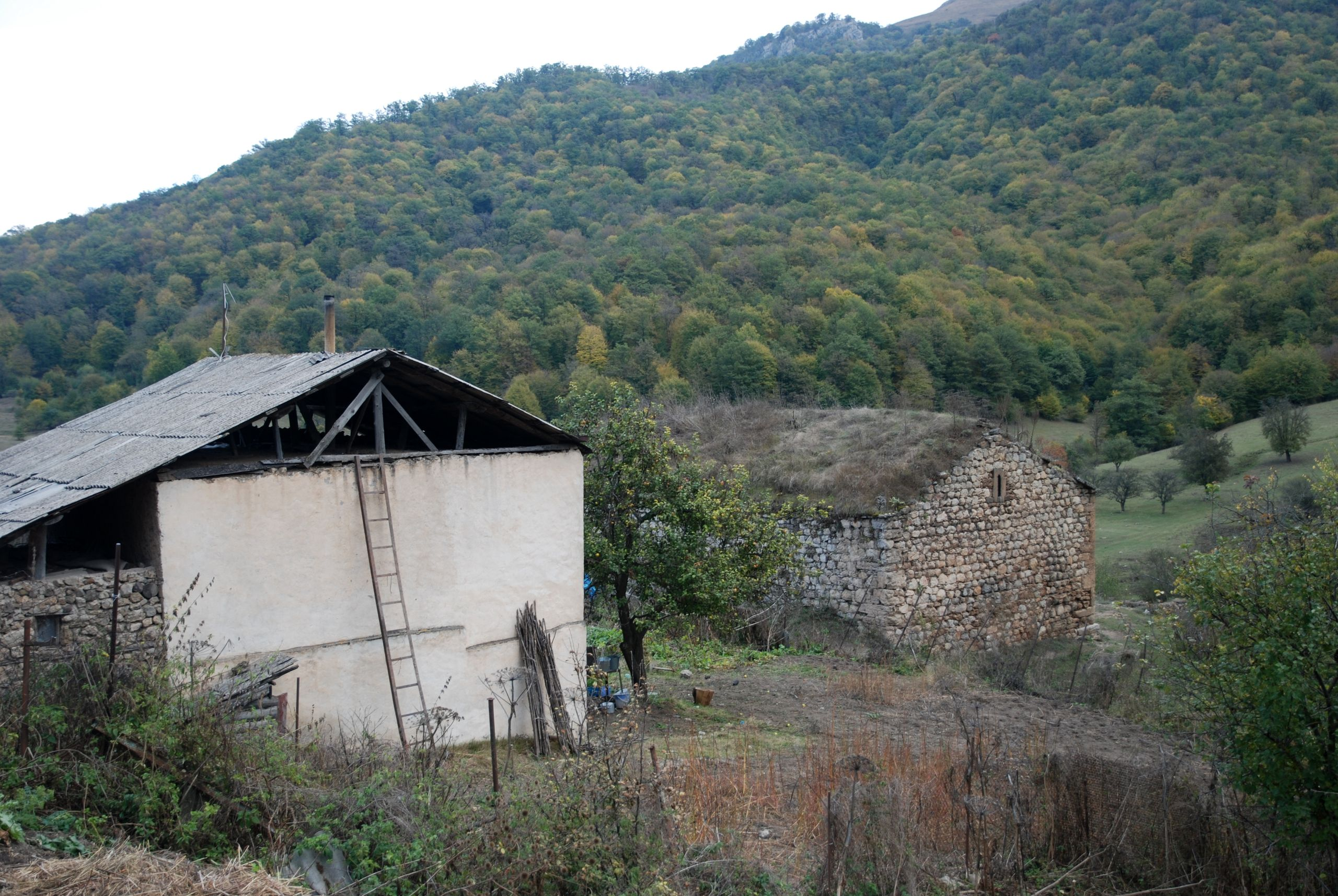
- Saint Hripsime Church in Tandzaver

- Location within Armenia Location within Syunik Province
- Coordinates: 39°21′01″N 46°19′42″E
- Country: Armenia
- Province: Syunik
- Municipality: Kapan

Area
  - Total: 3.72 km^{2} (1.44 sq mi)

Population (2011)
  - Total: 211
  - Density: 56.7/km^{2} (147/sq mi)
- Time zone: UTC+4 (AMT)

Tandzaver (Armenian: Տանձավեր) is a village in the Kapan Municipality of the Syunik Province in Armenia.

== Demographics ==
The Statistical Committee of Armenia reported its population was 212 in 2010, down from 263 at the 2001 census.

== Gallery ==
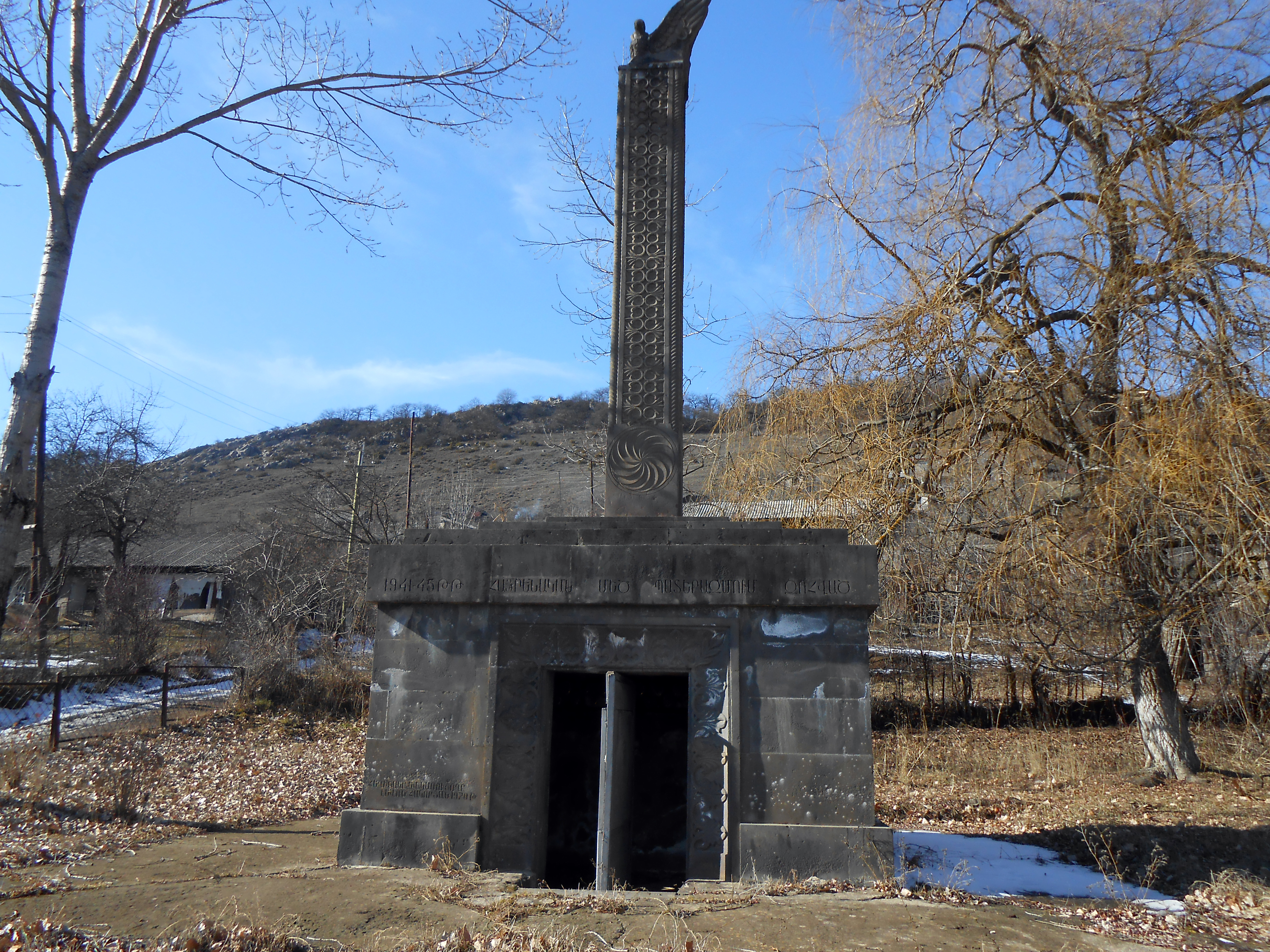
WWII memorial

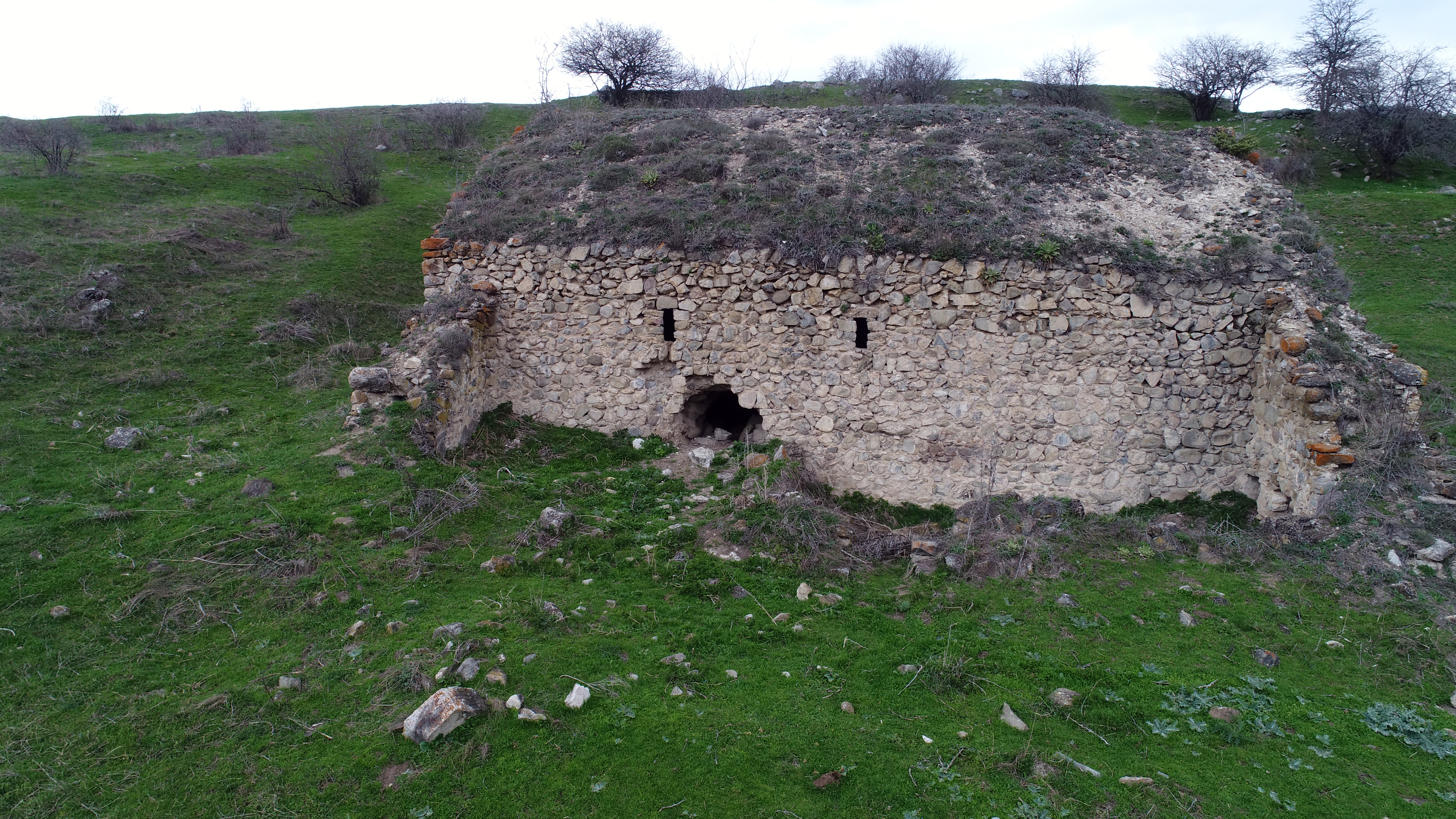
Church
