= Sevakar =

Sevakar Սևաքար
- Location within Armenia Location within Syunik Province
- Coordinates: 39°16′12″N 46°26′44″E
- Country: Armenia
- Province: Syunik
- Municipality: Kapan

Area
  - Total: 13.70 km^{2} (5.29 sq mi)

Population (2011)
  - Total: 104
  - Density: 7.59/km^{2} (19.7/sq mi)
- Time zone: UTC+4 (AMT)

Sevakar (Armenian: Սևաքար) is a village in the Kapan Municipality of the Syunik Province in Armenia.

== Demographics ==
The Statistical Committee of Armenia reported its population was 102 in 2010, down from 122 at the 2001 census.
