= Okhtar =

Okhtar Օխտար
- Location within Armenia Location within Syunik Province
- Coordinates: 39°16′49″N 46°21′45″E
- Country: Armenia
- Province: Syunik
- Municipality: Kapan

Area
  - Total: 3.30 km^{2} (1.27 sq mi)

Population (2011)
  - Total: 93
  - Density: 28/km^{2} (73/sq mi)
- Time zone: UTC+4 (AMT)

Okhtar (Armenian: Օխտար) is a village in the Kapan Municipality of the Syunik Province in Armenia.

== Demographics ==
The Statistical Committee of Armenia reported its population was 87 in 2010, down from 124 at the 2001 census.
