= Antarashat =

Antarashat Անտառաշատ
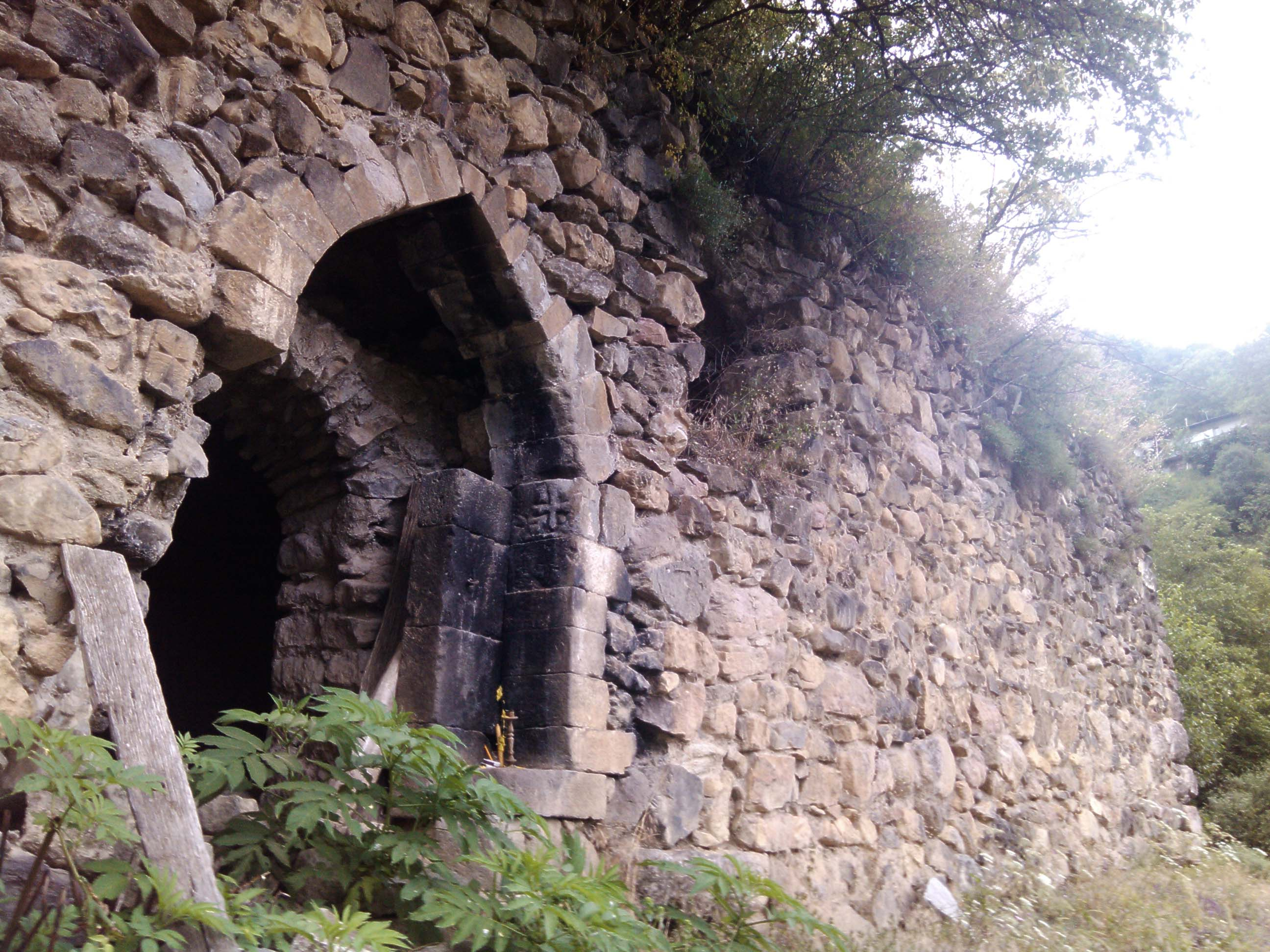

- Location within Armenia Location within Syunik Province
- Coordinates: 39°18′01″N 46°19′45″E
- Country: Armenia
- Province: Syunik
- Municipality: Kapan

Area
  - Total: 16.48 km^{2} (6.36 sq mi)

Population (2011)
  - Total: 163
  - Density: 9.89/km^{2} (25.6/sq mi)
- Time zone: UTC+4 (AMT)

Antarashat (Armenian: Անտառաշատ) is a village in the Kapan Municipality of the Syunik Province in Armenia.

== Etymology ==
The village was previously known as Tort’in, Tort’n, Tortni, Dort’ni and Torini.

== Demographics ==
The Statistical Committee of Armenia reported its population as 120 in 2010, down from 131 at the 2001 census.

== Gallery ==
Saint Hripsime Church in Antarashat

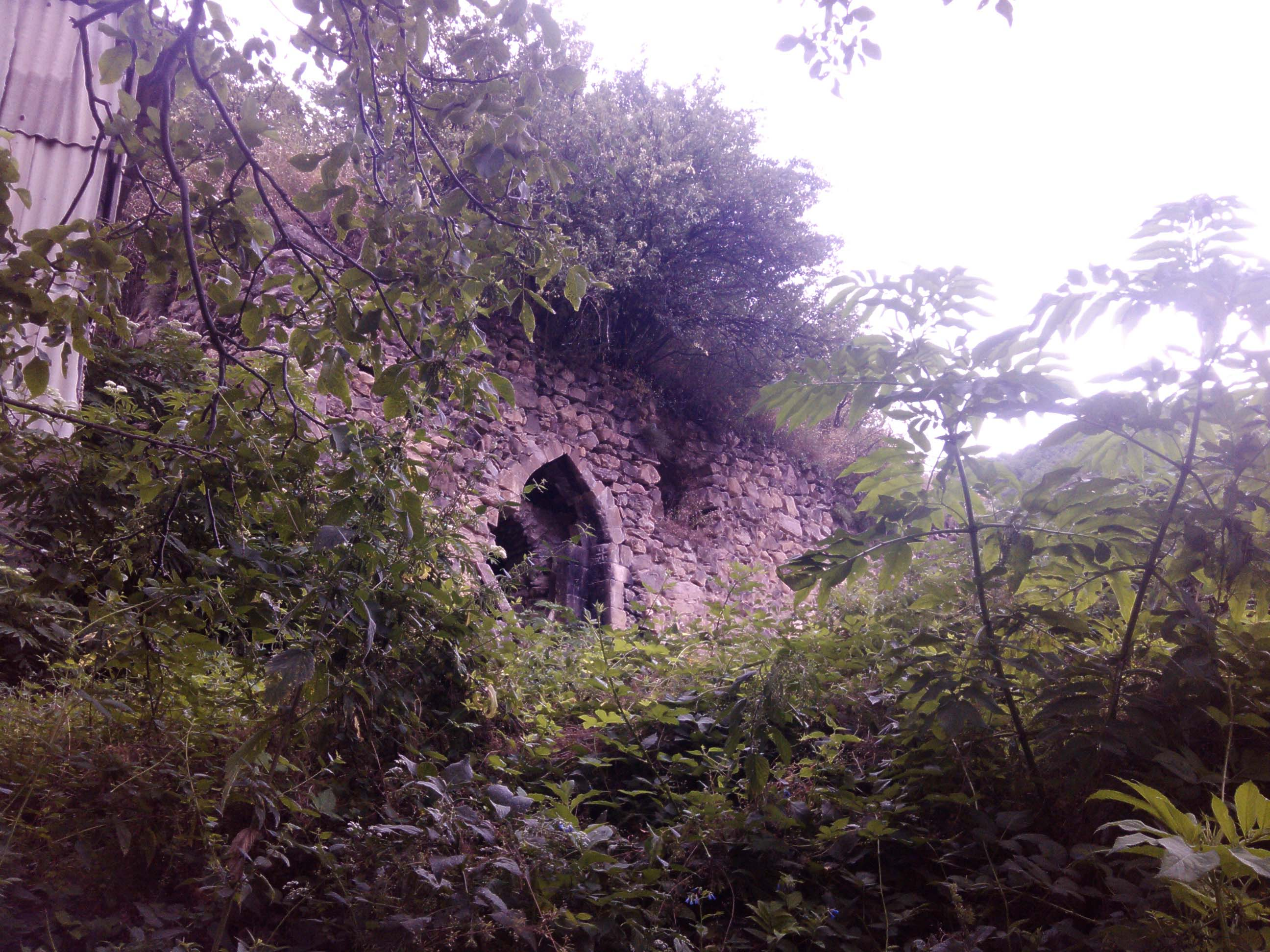

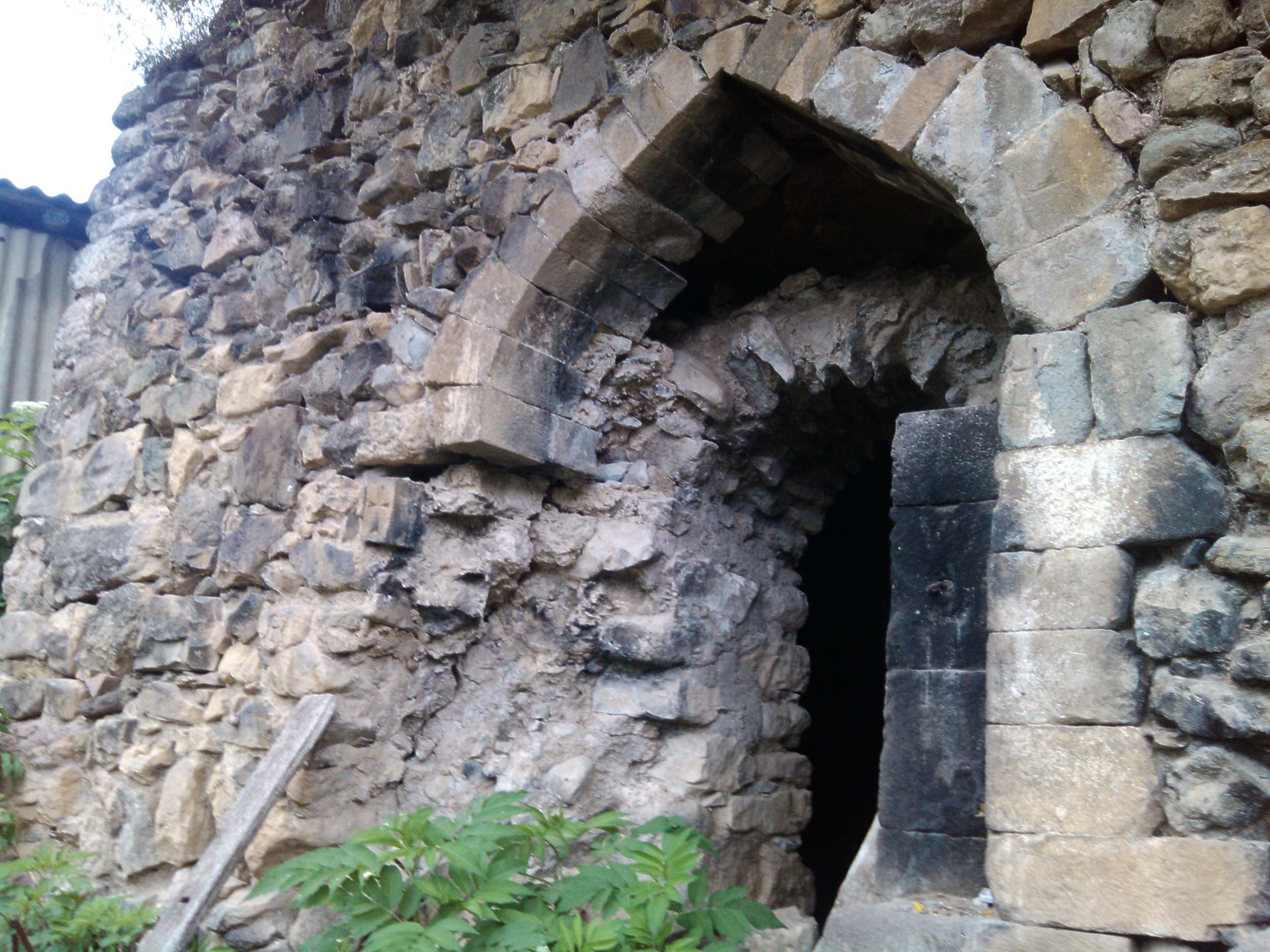

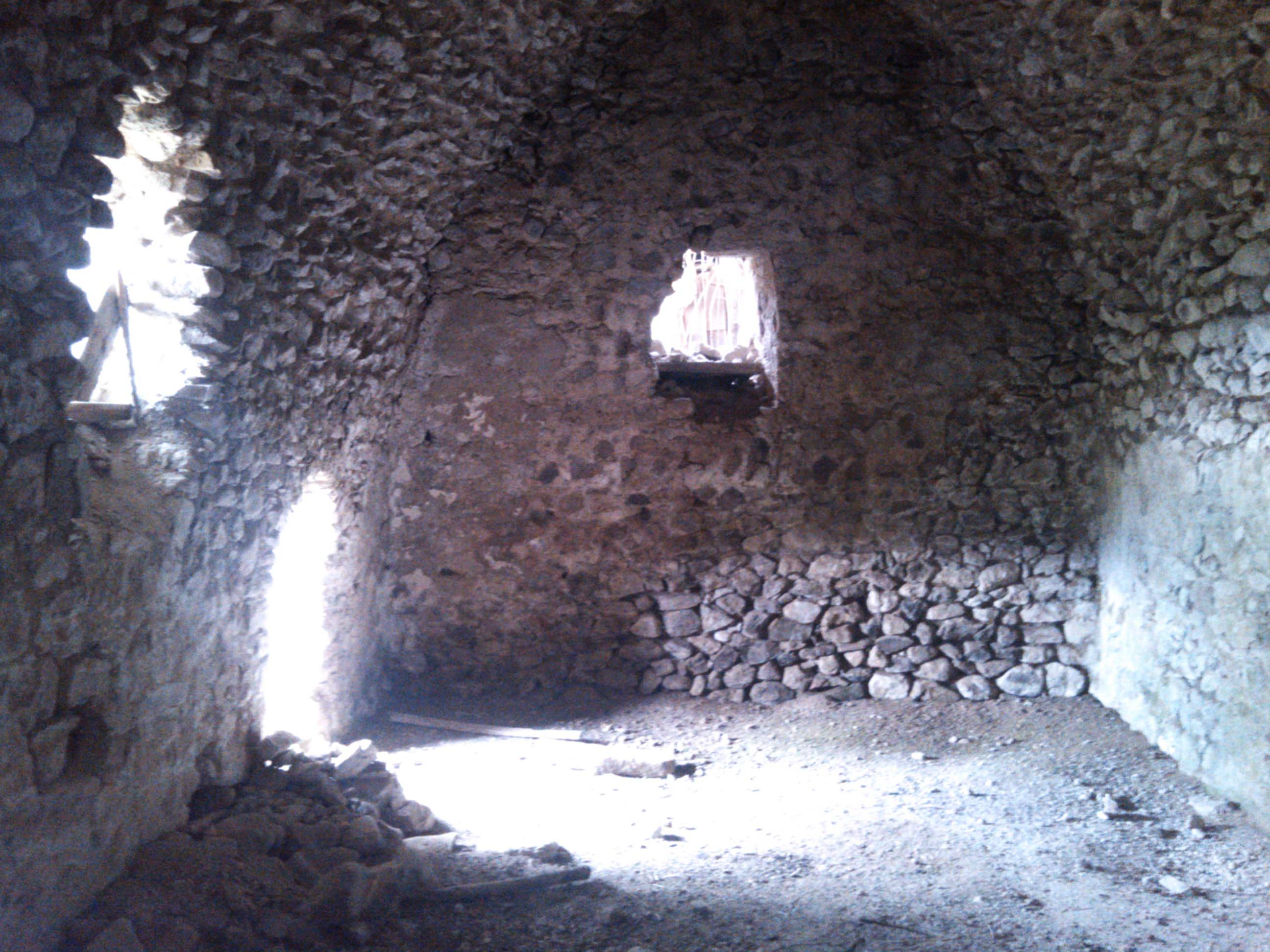
