= Tavrus =

Tavrus Տավրուս
- Location within Armenia Location within Syunik Province
- Coordinates: 39°17′44″N 46°21′35″E
- Country: Armenia
- Province: Syunik
- Municipality: Kapan

Area
  - Total: 3.76 km^{2} (1.45 sq mi)

Population (2011)
  - Total: 92
  - Density: 24/km^{2} (63/sq mi)
- Time zone: UTC+4 (AMT)

Tavrus (Armenian: Տավրուս) is a village in the Kapan Municipality of the Syunik Province in Armenia.

== Etymology ==
The village was previously known as Dovrus (Դովրուս).

== Demographics ==
The Statistical Committee of Armenia reported its population was 96 in 2010, down from 105 at the 2001 census.
