= Agarak, Kapan =

Agarak Ագարակ
- Location within Armenia Location within Syunik Province
- Coordinates: 39°12′14″N 46°32′50″E
- Country: Armenia
- Province: Syunik
- Municipality: Kapan

Area
  - Total: 16.60 km^{2} (6.41 sq mi)

Population (2011)
  - Total: 177
  - Density: 10.7/km^{2} (27.6/sq mi)
- Time zone: UTC+4 (AMT)

Agarak (Armenian: Ագարակ) is a village in the Kapan Municipality of the Syunik Province in Armenia.

== Demographics ==
The Statistical Committee of Armenia reported Agarak's population as 183 in 2010, down from 190 at the 2001 census.
