= Yegheg =

Yegheg Եղեգ
- Location within Armenia Location within Syunik Province
- Coordinates: 39°17′57″N 46°25′15″E
- Country: Armenia
- Province: Syunik
- Municipality: Kapan

Area
  - Total: 10.12 km^{2} (3.91 sq mi)

Population (2011)
  - Total: 121
  - Density: 12.0/km^{2} (31.0/sq mi)
- Time zone: UTC+4 (AMT)

Yegheg (Armenian: Եղեգ) is a village in the Kapan Municipality of the Syunik Province in Armenia.

== Etymology ==
The village was previously known as Shabadin (Շաբադին).

== Demographics ==
The National Statistical Service of the Republic of Armenia (ARMSTAT) reported its population as 113 in 2010, down from 166 at the 2001 census.
