= Verin Khotanan =

Verin Khotanan Վերին Խոտանան
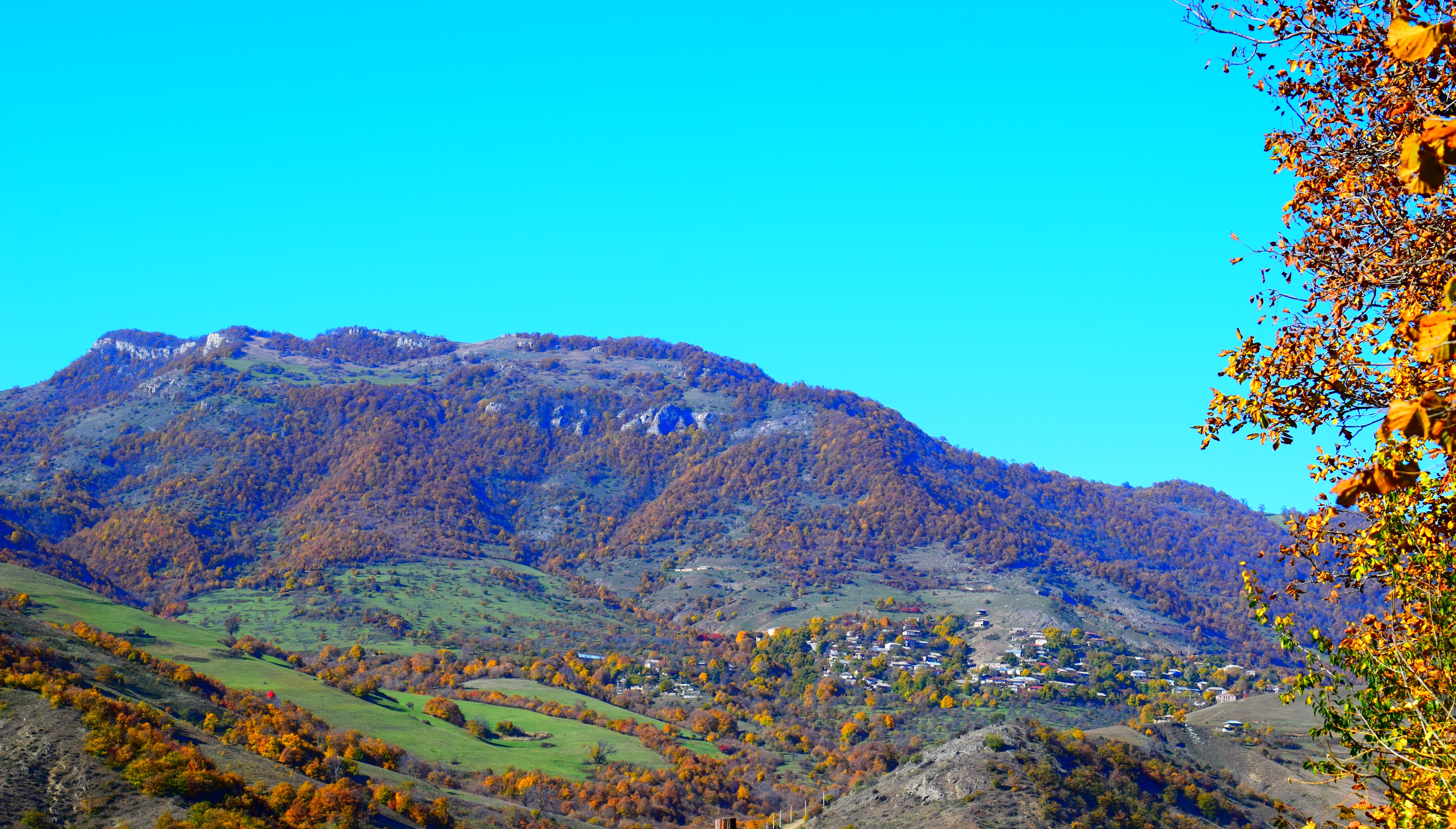

- Location within Armenia Location within Syunik Province
- Coordinates: 39°18′38″N 46°22′39″E
- Country: Armenia
- Province: Syunik
- Municipality: Kapan

Area
  - Total: 14.67 km^{2} (5.66 sq mi)

Population (2011)
  - Total: 203
  - Density: 13.8/km^{2} (35.8/sq mi)
- Time zone: UTC+4 (AMT)

Verin Khotanan (Armenian: Վերին Խոտանան) is a village in the Kapan Municipality of the Syunik Province in Armenia.

== Etymology ==
The village is also known as Verkhniy Khotanan and Verev Khotanan.

== Demographics ==
The Statistical Committee of Armenia reported its population was 199 in 2010, down from 295 at the 2001 census.

== Gallery ==
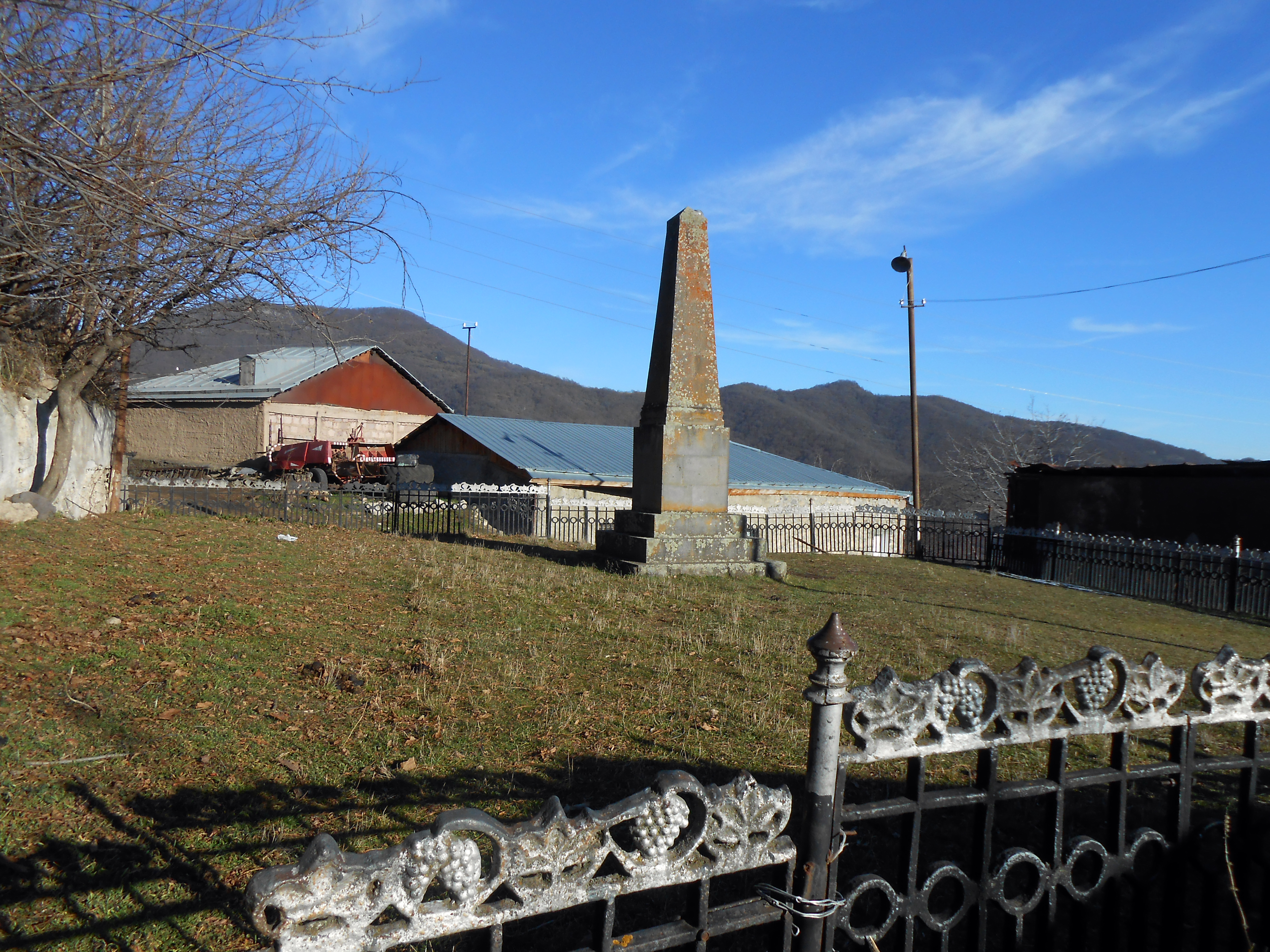
WWII memorial

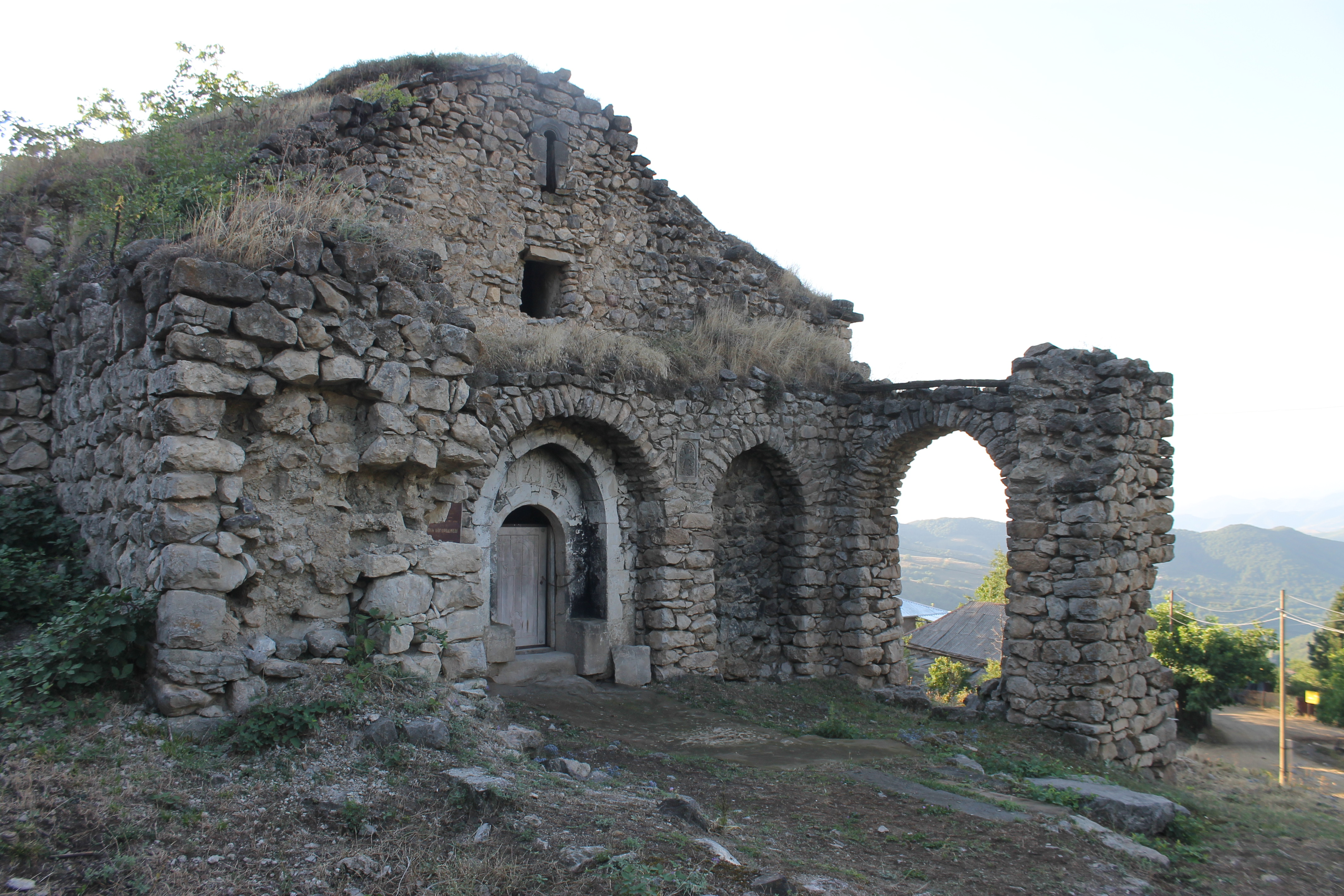
Surb Astvatsatsin Church
