= Kapan Municipality =

Kapan Կապան
- Urban Community
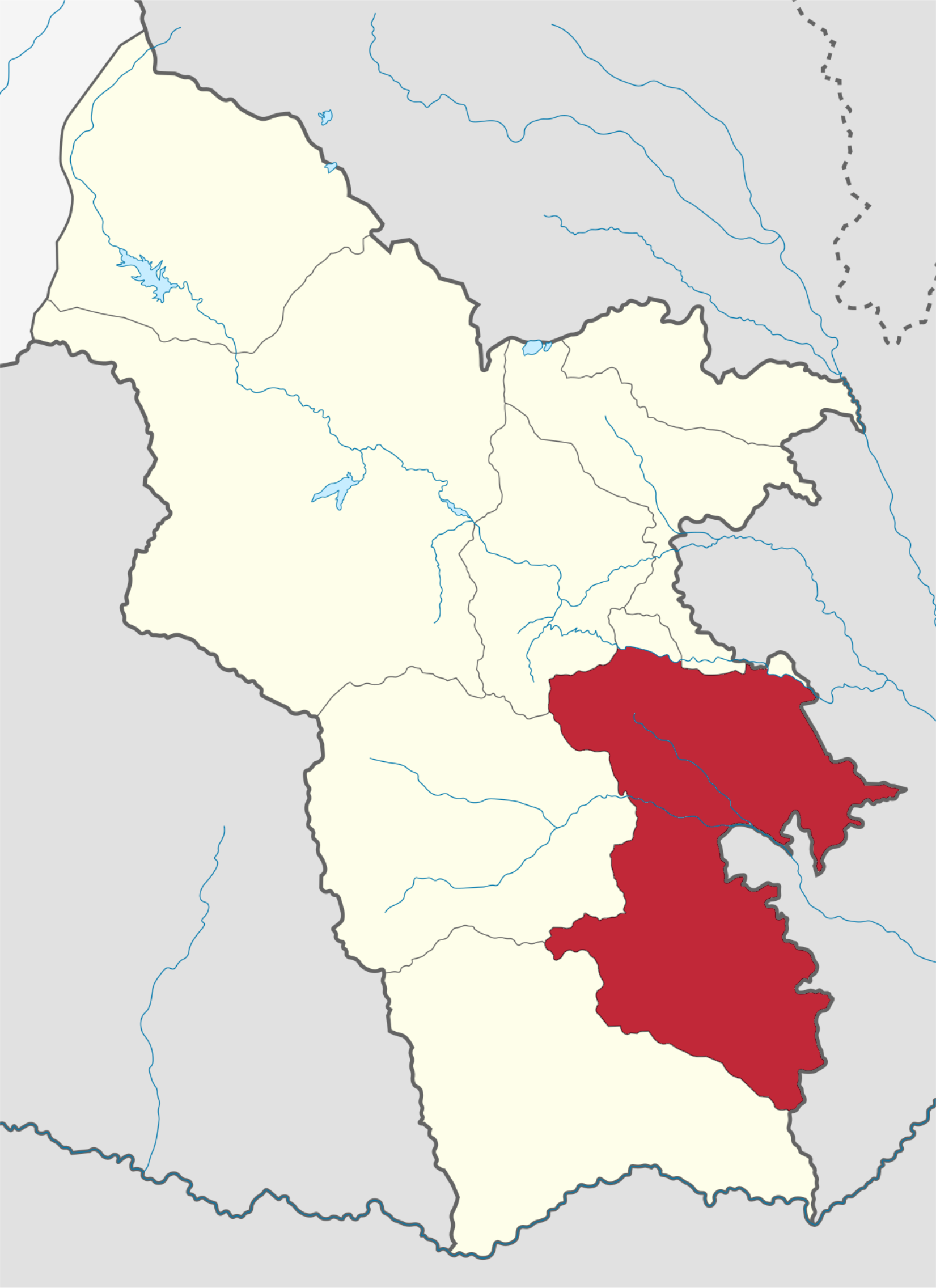
- Coordinates: 39°14′N 46°24′E
- Country: Armenia
- Province: Syunik
- Formed: 9 June 2017
- Administrative centre: Kapan

Government
  - Mayor: Gevorg Parsyan

Population (2011 census)
  - Total: 49,788
- Time zone: AMT (UTC+04)
- Postal code: 3201–3519
- ISO 3166 code: AM-SU
- FIPS 10-4: AM08

Kapan Municipality, referred to as Kapan Community (Armenian: Կապան Համայնք Kapan Hamaynk), is an urban community and administrative subdivision of Syunik Province of Armenia, at the south of the country. Consisted of a group of settlements, its administrative centre is the town of Kapan.

== Included settlements ==
Settlement	Type	Population (2011 census)
Kapan	Town, administrative centre	43,190
Agarak	Village	177
Atchanan	Village	164
Aghavni	Village	98
Antarashat	Village	163
Arajadzor	Village	184
Artsvanik	Village	625
Bargushat	Village	98
Chakaten	Village	131
Chapni	Village	112
Davit Bek	Village	796
Ditsmayri	Village	165
Dzorastan	Village	65
Geghanush	Village	253
Gomaran	Village	71
Kaghnut	Village	105
Khdrants	Village	48
Khordzor	Village	18
Nerkin Hand	Village	97
Nerkin Khotanan	Village	65
Norashenik	Village	128
Okhtar	Village	93
Sevakar	Village	104
Shikahogh	Village	229
Shishkert	Village	264
Shrvenants	Village	76
Srashen	Village	90
Syunik	Village	791
Sznak	Village	194
Tandzaver	Village	211
Tavrus	Village	92
Tsav	Village	74
Uzhanis	Village	59
Vanek	Village	61
Vardavank	Village	100
Verin Khotanan	Village	203
Yegheg	Village	121
Yeghvard	Village	273

== Politics ==
Kapan Municipal Assembly (Armenian: Կապանի համայնքապետարան, Kapani hamaynqapetaran) is the representative body in Kapan Municipality, consisting of 27 members which are elected every five years. The last election was held in November 2021. Gevorg Parsyan of Shant Alliance Nationalist Party was elected mayor.

Party	2021	Current Municipal Assembly
**Shant Alliance Nationalist Party**	**19**	
Civil Contract	**8**	
Total	27	

Ruling coalition or party marked in bold.

== See also ==
- Syunik Province
