= Nerkin Khotanan =

Nerkin Khotanan Ներքին Խոտանան
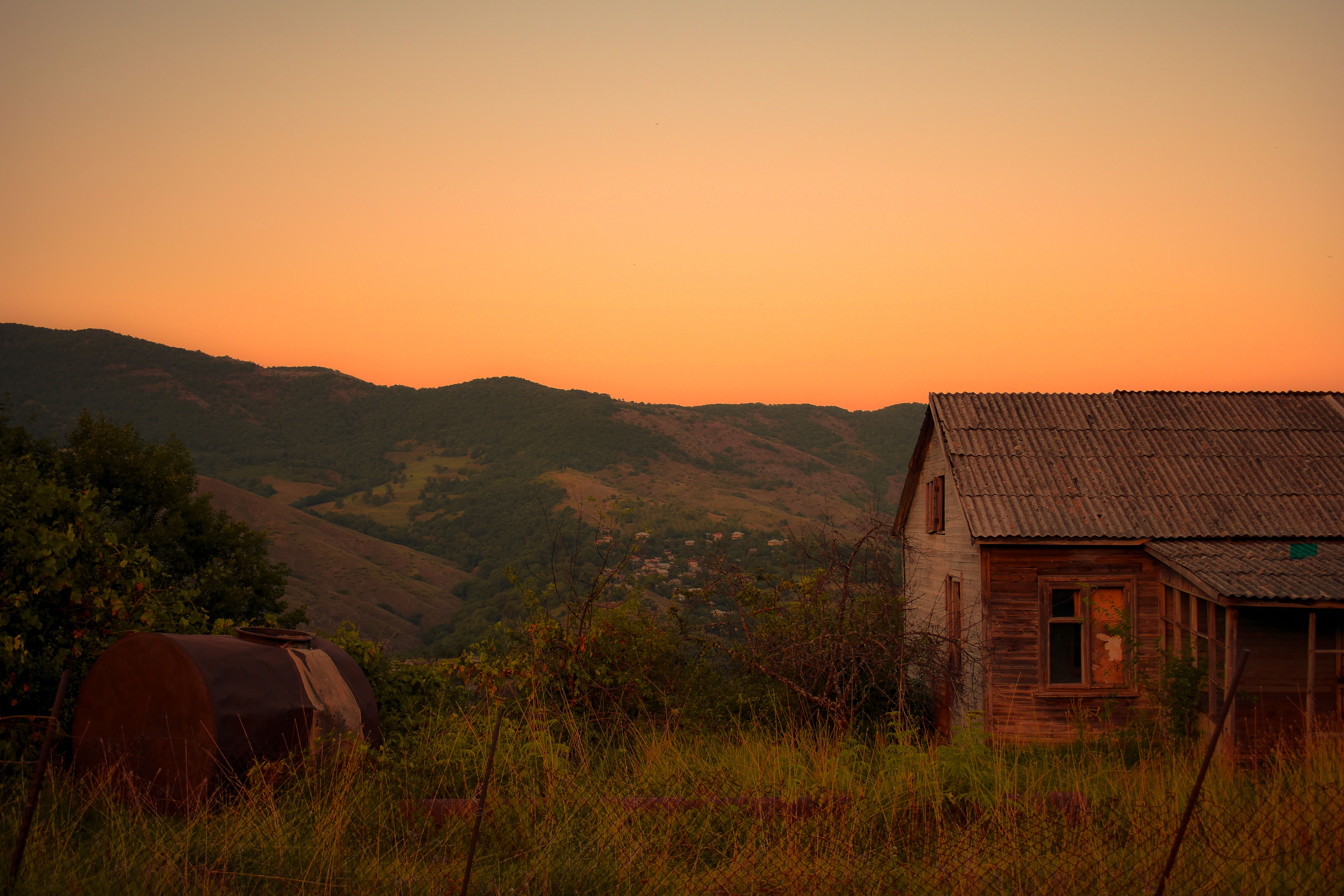

- Location within Armenia Location within Syunik Province
- Coordinates: 39°17′01″N 46°22′40″E
- Country: Armenia
- Province: Syunik
- Municipality: Kapan

Area
  - Total: 4.36 km^{2} (1.68 sq mi)

Population (2011)
  - Total: 65
  - Density: 15/km^{2} (39/sq mi)
- Time zone: UTC+4 (AMT)

Nerkin Khotanan (Armenian: Ներքին Խոտանան) is a village in the Kapan Municipality of the Syunik Province in Armenia.

== Demographics ==
The Statistical Committee of Armenia reported its population was 70 in 2010, down from 101 at the 2001 census.

== Gallery ==
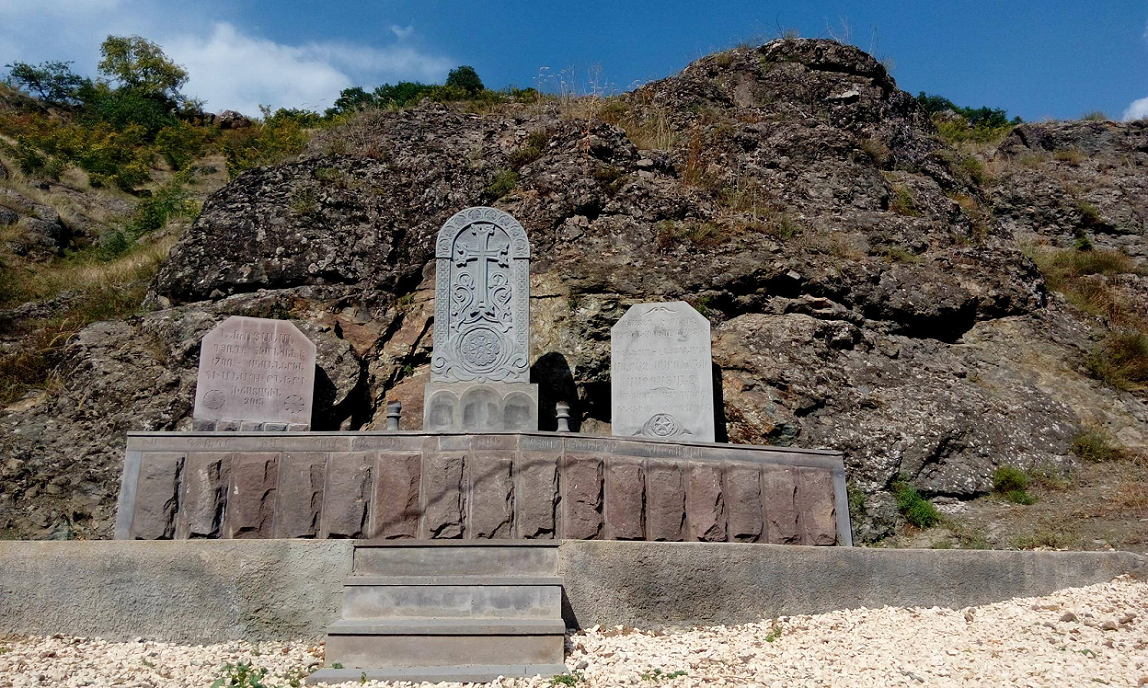
Memorial dedicated to the founders of the village

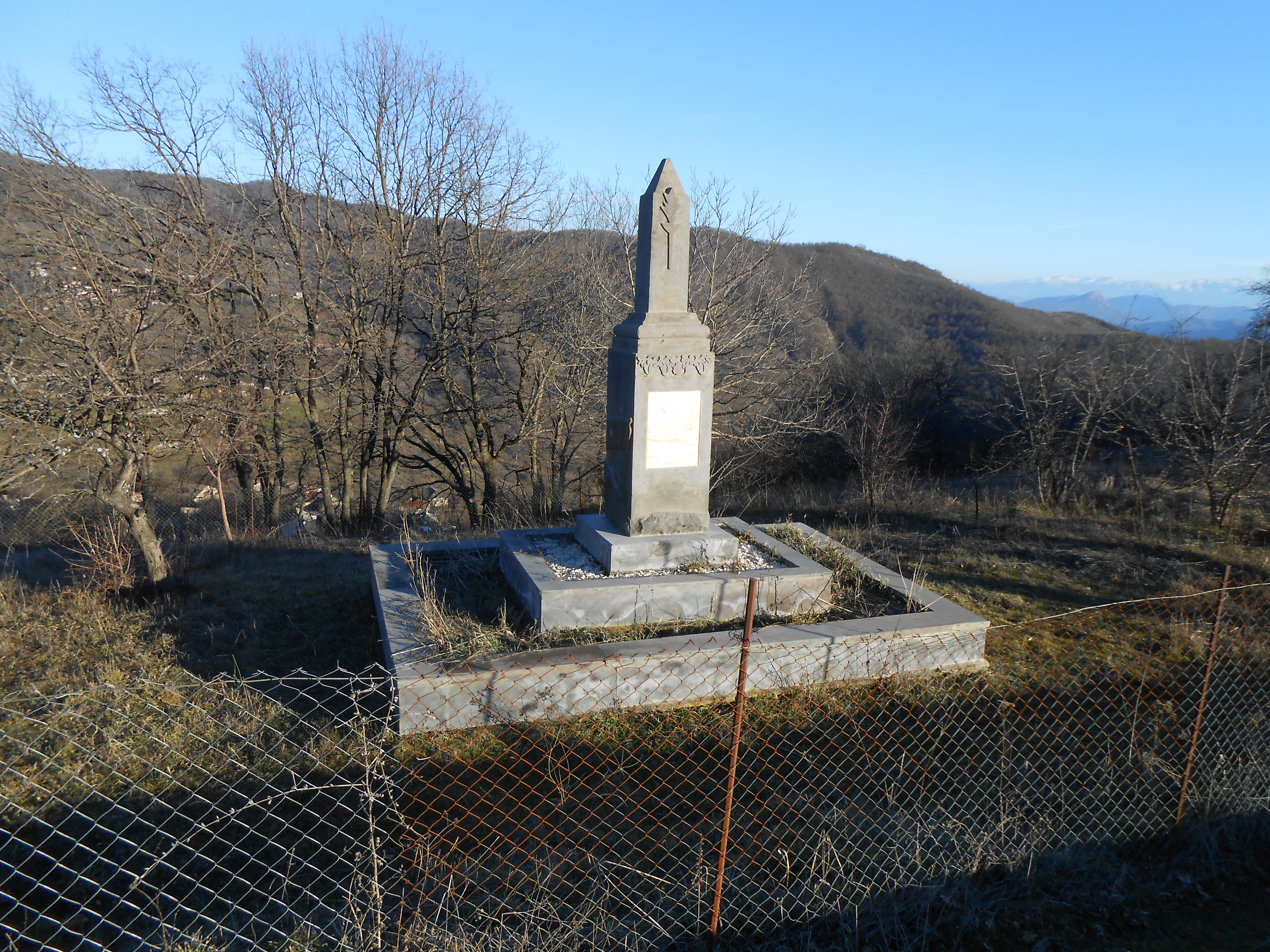
WWII monument
