= Ditsmayri =

Ditsmayri Դիցմայրի
- Location within Armenia Location within Syunik Province
- Coordinates: 39°12′17″N 46°28′53″E
- Country: Armenia
- Province: Syunik
- Municipality: Kapan

Population (2011)
  - Total: 165
- Time zone: UTC+4 (AMT)

Ditsmayri (Armenian: Դիցմայրի) is a village in the Kapan Municipality of the Syunik Province in Armenia.
