= Sznak =

Sznak Սզնակ
- Location within Armenia Location within Syunik Province
- Coordinates: 39°13′N 46°28′E
- Country: Armenia
- Province: Syunik
- Municipality: Kapan

Population (2011)
  - Total: 194
- Time zone: UTC+4 (AMT)

Sznak (Armenian: Սզնակ) is a village in the Kapan Municipality of the Syunik Province in Armenia.
