= Geghanush =

Geghanush Գեղանուշ
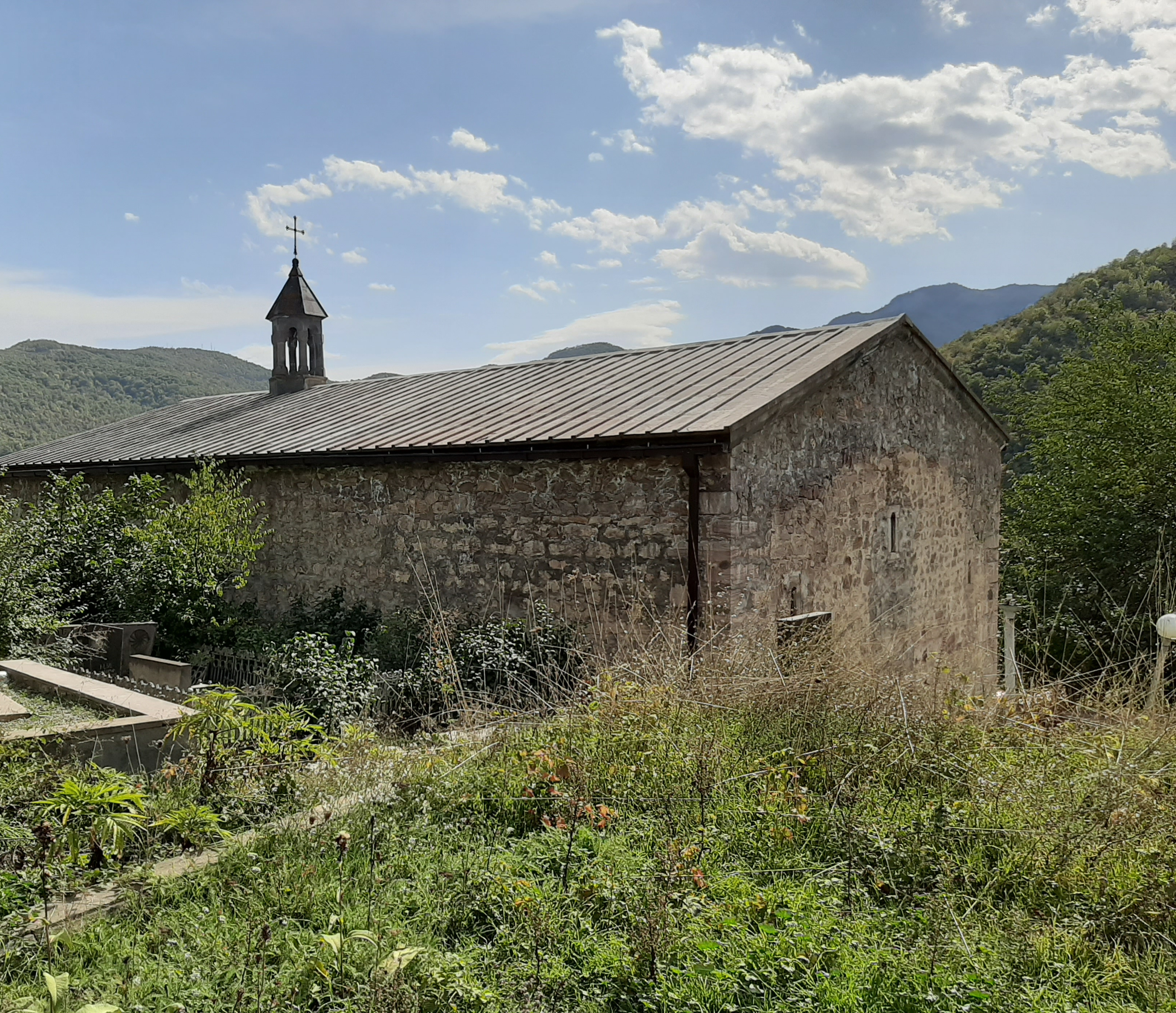
- Church of Surb Hripsime in Geghanush

- Location within Armenia Location within Syunik Province
- Coordinates: 39°10′08″N 46°25′01″E
- Country: Armenia
- Province: Syunik
- Municipality: Kapan

Area
  - Total: 21.93 km^{2} (8.47 sq mi)

Population (2011)
  - Total: 253
  - Density: 11.5/km^{2} (29.9/sq mi)
- Time zone: UTC+4 (AMT)

Geghanush (Armenian: Գեղանուշ) is a village in the Kapan Municipality of the Syunik Province in Armenia.

== Demographics ==
The village had a population of 280 in 2001 (with the community of Geghanush having a population of 356), 293 in 2009, 286 in 2010, and 253 in 2011 (with the community of Geghanush having a population of 324).

== Gallery ==
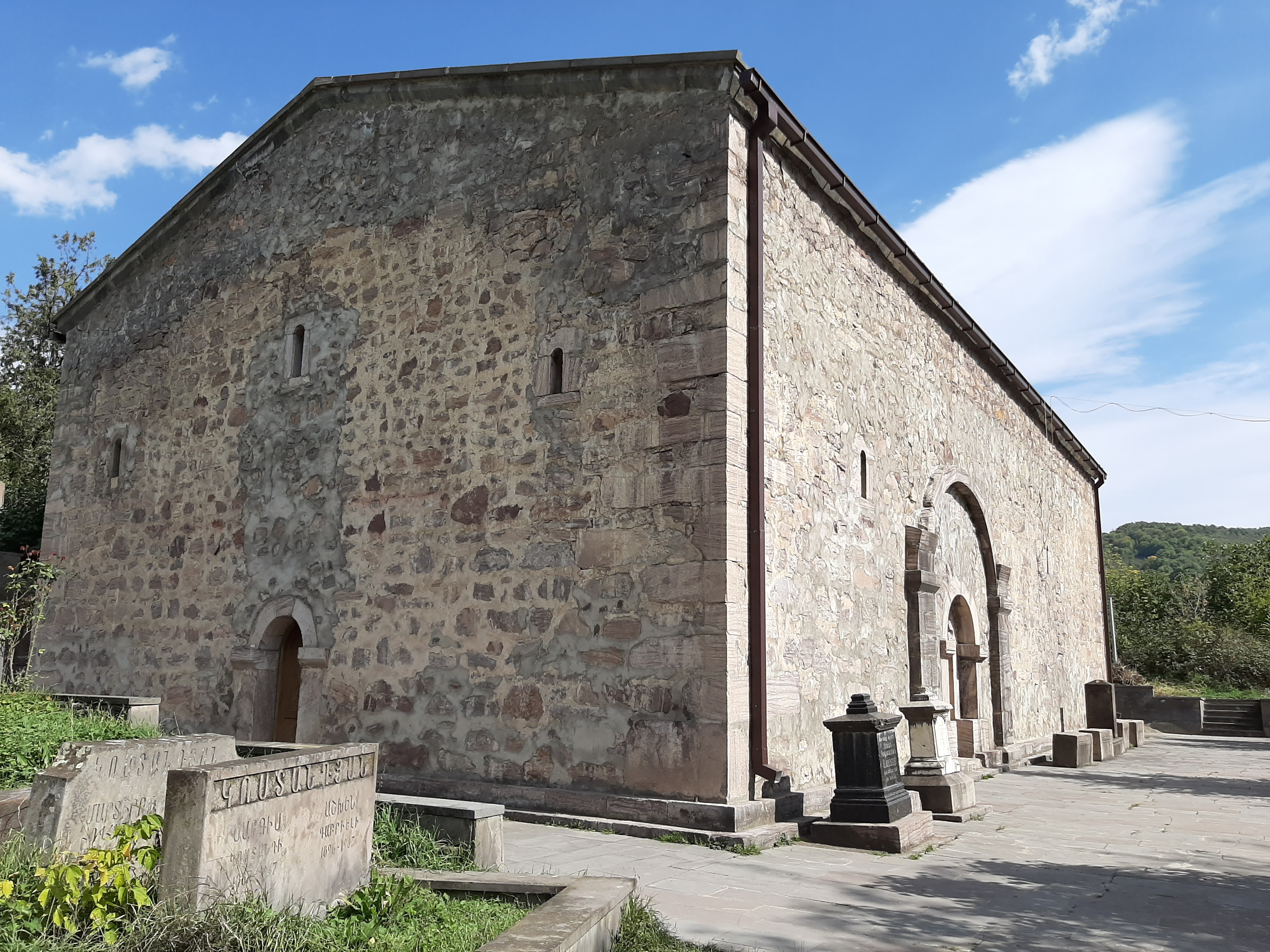
Surb Hripsime Church

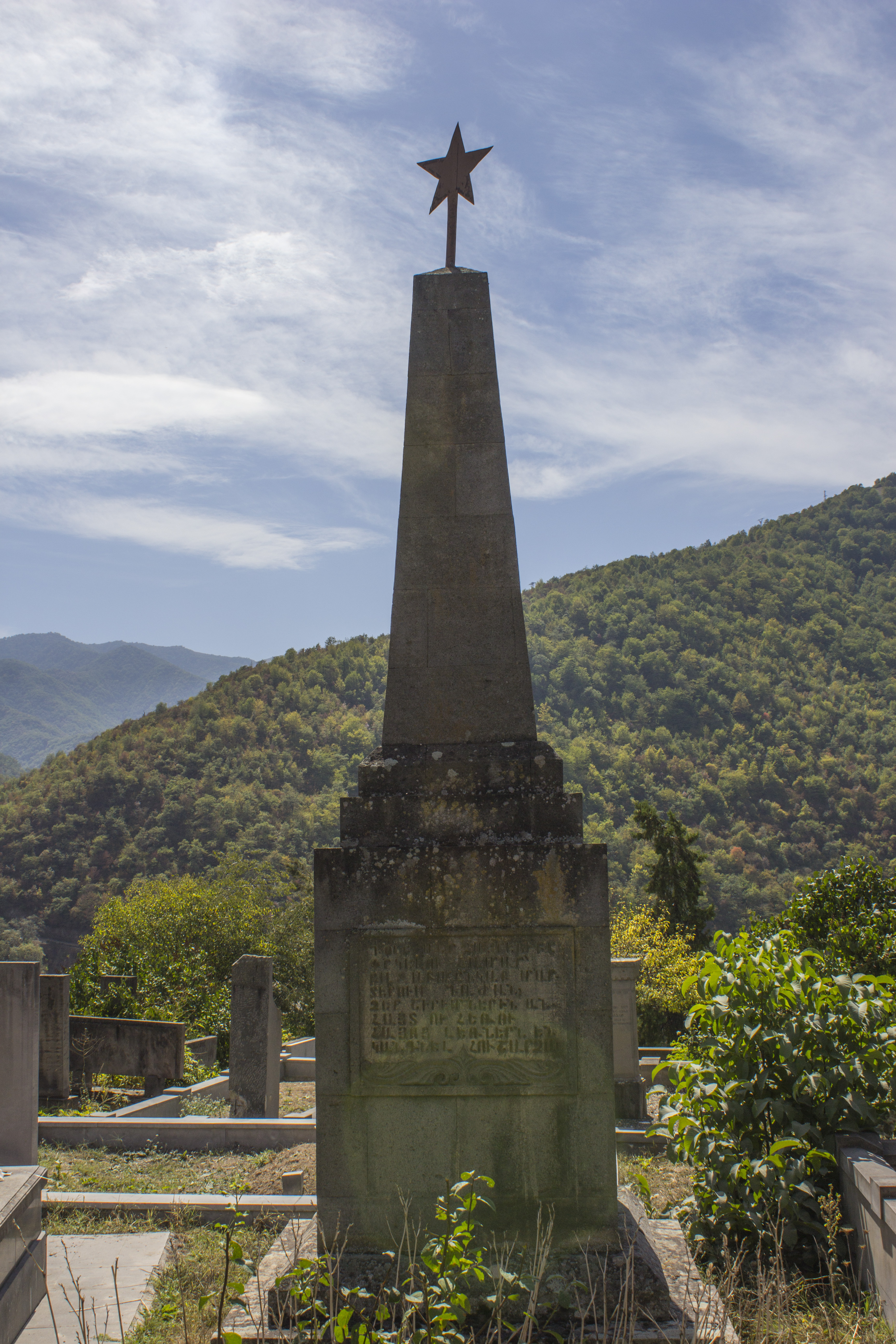
WWII memorial

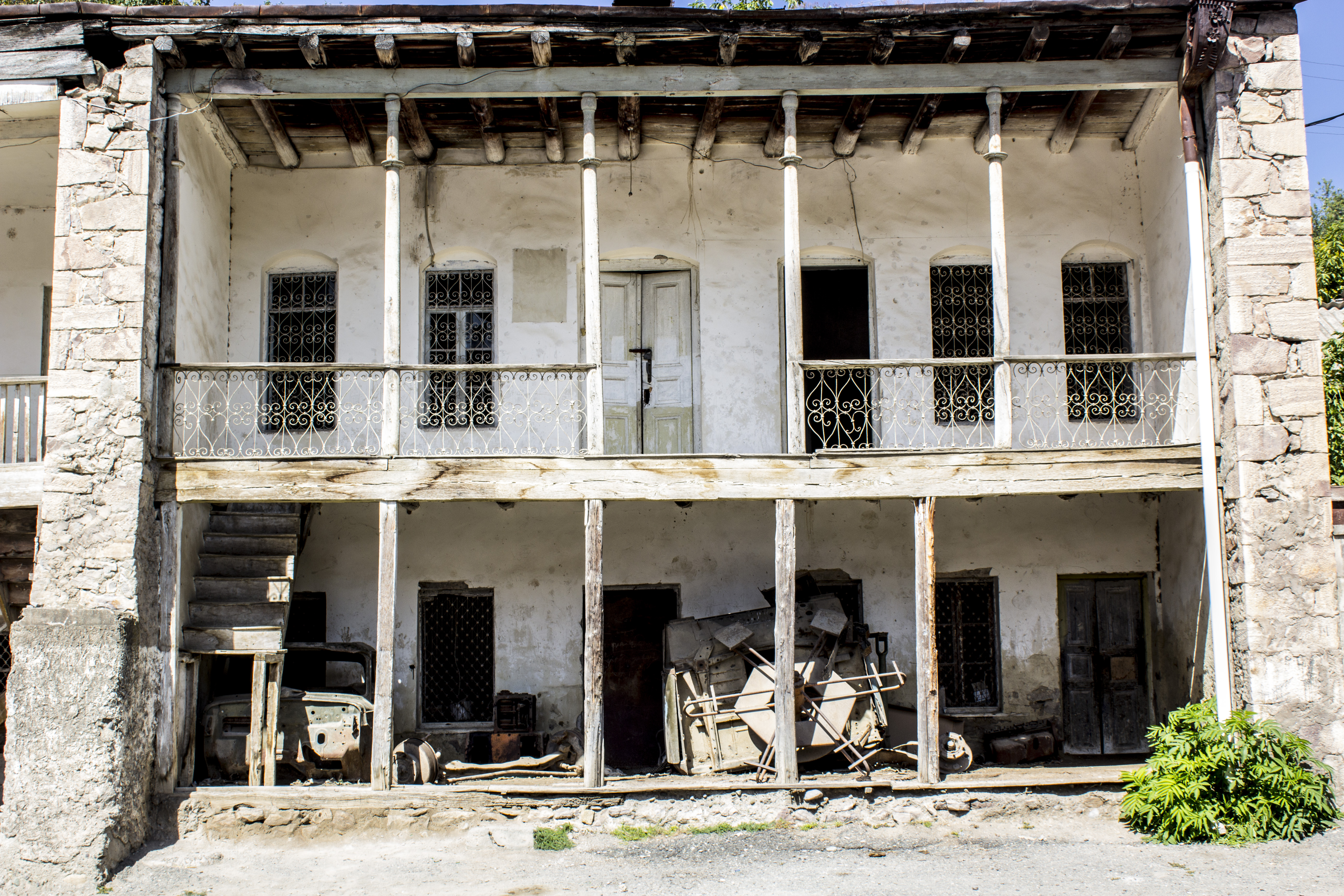
Avagyan house

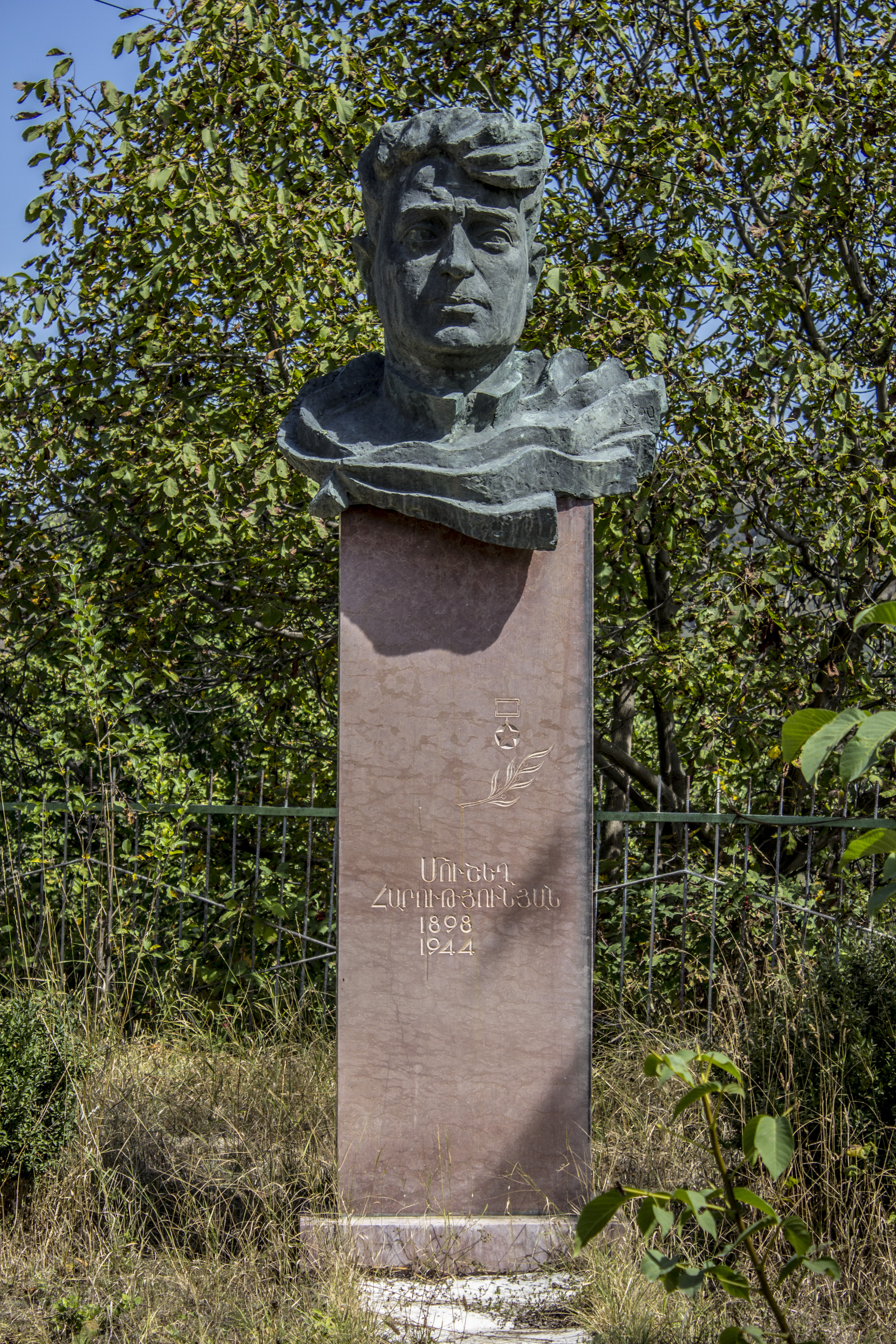
Mushegh Harutyunyan monument
