= Khordzor =

Khordzor Խորձոր
- Location within Armenia Location within Syunik Province
- Coordinates: 39°12′02″N 46°22′16″E
- Country: Armenia
- Province: Syunik
- Municipality: Kapan

Population (2011)
  - Total: 18
- Time zone: UTC+4 (AMT)

Khordzor (Armenian: Խորձոր) is a village in the Kapan Municipality of the Syunik Province in Armenia.
