= Statistical Committee of Armenia =

National statistical agency of Armenia

- Հայաստանի վիճակագրական կոմիտե

Agency overview
- Website: armstat.am/en/

The Statistical Committee of Armenia (Armenian: Հայաստանի վիճակագրական կոմիտե), or ArmStat in short, is the national statistical agency of Armenia.

== History ==
The statistical institution started its main activities on 7 January 1922 and was previously known as the Statistical Department of Soviet Socialist Republic of Armenia. It was also previously known as:

- National Statistical Service of the Republic of Armenia (May 2000- April 2018)
- Ministry of Statistics, State Register and Analysis of the Republic of Armenia (April 1998-May 2000),
- State Department of Statistics, State Register and Analysis of the Republic of Armenia (1992-1998),
- State Statistical Committee of the Soviet Socialist Republic of Armenia (1987-1992).

== International cooperation ==
Armenia joined the International Monetary Fund's Special Data Dissemination Standard on 7 November 2003, being the third member of the Commonwealth of Independent States to join. From 1 January 2009, Armenia was a member of the United Nations Statistical Commission until the end of 2012.

== See also ==
- Census in Armenia
- Government of Armenia
- List of national and international statistical services
