= Geghi =

Geghi Գեղի
- Location within Armenia Location within Syunik Province
- Coordinates: 39°13′12″N 46°09′20″E
- Country: Armenia
- Province: Syunik
- Municipality: Kajaran

Area
  - Total: 68.67 km^{2} (26.51 sq mi)

Population (2011)
  - Total: 172
  - Density: 2.50/km^{2} (6.49/sq mi)
- Time zone: UTC+4 (AMT)

Geghi (Armenian: Գեղի) is a village in the Kajaran Municipality of the Syunik Province in Armenia.

== History ==
The village had 570 inhabitants in 1959, 932 in 1970 and 1,115 inhabitants in 1979.

== Population ==
The Statistical Committee of Armenia reported the community's population as 172 at the 2011 Armenian census, up from 138 in 2010, but down from 227 at the 2001 census.

== Municipal administration ==
Geghi was previously a community which included the villages of Geghi, Geghavank, Kard, Kitsk, Verin Geghavank and Karut, until the June 2017 administrative and territorial reforms, when the village became a part of the Kajaran Municipality.
