= Kuchuma =

- Location in Armenia Kuchuma (Syunik Province)
- Coordinates: 39°12′N 46°16′E
- Country: Armenia
- Province: Syunik
- Elevation: 1,725 m (5,659 ft)

Kuchuma is a town in south-eastern Armenia. It is located in Syunik Province. It is located about 4 km north of Adzhilu.

Other nearby towns and villages include Kavchut (1.3 miles), Nerkin Giratagh (1.2 miles), Musallam (0.9 miles) and Ajylu (2.5 miles)

== See also ==
- Lernadzor
- Syunik Province
