= Giratagh =

Giratagh or Girat’agh or Giratag may refer to:

- Nerkin Giratagh, Armenia
- Verin Giratagh, Armenia
