= Baghaberd =

Armenian fortress

Baghaberd Fortress
- Բաղաբերդ
- Syunik Province, Armenia
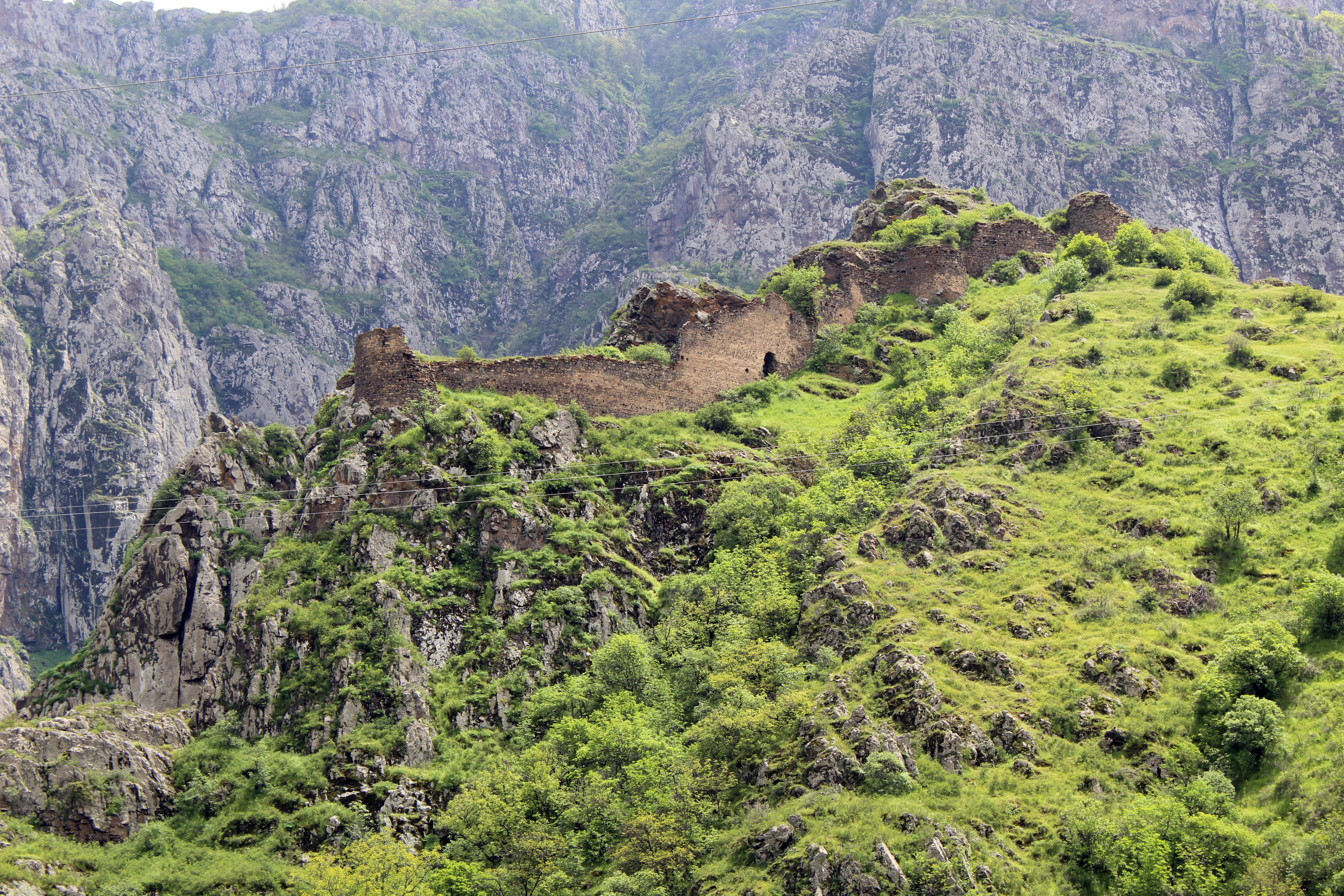
- Fortification walls of Baghaberd.

Site information
- Type: Fortress
- Open to the public: Yes
- Condition: Ramparts and several towers are still mostly intact.

Location
- Shown within Armenia
- Location within Armenia Location within Syunik Province
- Coordinates: 39.214849°N 46.277611°E

Site history
- Built: 4th century
- Built by: Baghak of Sisak Nahapet
- Materials: Stone
- Demolished: Partially
- Battles/wars: Prince Andovk of Syunik's victory over the Persian King Shapur II in the 4th century. Captured in 1170 by the Seljuq Turks
- Events: Became the last capital of the Syunik kingdom in the 12th century.

Airfield information
- Identifiers

Baghaberd (Armenian: Բաղաբերդ;) a fortress in the Dzork province of the historical Syunik province of Greater Armenia. It was one of the impregnable fortresses of the Syunik province, which, starting from the 4th century (until its capture in 1170), served as an important military stronghold, and during the period of the Kingdom of Syunik (970 – 1170), it was the main link in the military-strategic defense system of the capital city of Kapan. The fortress is currently located in the territory of Andokavan village of the Syunik region.

Baghaberd is mentioned in history under the names Baghats Fortress, Baghberd and Paghabert. References to the fortress are made by Shapuh Bagratuni (9th century), Hovhannes Draskhanakerttsi (10th century), Vardan Areveltsi (13th century), Mkhitar Ayrivanetsi (13th century), and Stepanos Orbelian (13th-14th centuries).

== Location ==
It is one of the ancient fortresses of Armenia, which, thanks to its strong position, was famed since early times as an inaccessible fortress. In case of external dangers, Baghaberd frequently becomes a shelter for the inhabitants of the surrounding area. The significance of Baghaberd increases even more during the times of the Kingdom of Syunik, when, due to unfavorable political conditions, the immense riches and many thousands of manuscripts of the Tatev Monastery and other monasteries in the country were concentrated here. It is clearly visible from the ruins that Baghaberd had double walls with their towers. According to popular legends, a rather copious spring, which now emerges right on the bank of the Voghji River, was once channeled inside the fortress. Baghaberd (Fortress of Kapan) is a fortress located in the Dzork province of the Syunik province of historical Armenia. It is located to the west of the city of Kapan, on the highway leading to Kajaran, not far from the confluence of the Voghji and Geghi rivers. It sits on one of the mountain spurs precipitously descending from the Barkushat mountain range toward the left bank of the Voghjaget River, whose tongue-forming triangular plateau's vertical, inaccessible rocky cliffs are washed at the foot of the spur by the fast-flowing waters of the Voghjaget and its left-bank tributary, the Giratagh. The inaccessible rocky walls and the system of natural obstacles make the entire western section of the fortress site impregnable. Conditioned by the terrain, the fortress had predominantly one-sided construction. It is one of the major defensive structures of Armenia.

== History ==
For the location and orientation of the fortress, a plateau on the summit of a rocky spur surrounded by the bottomless gorges of the Voghjaget River was chosen, which, with its dominant position, had the opportunity to oversee the historical city of Kapan. According to the tradition reported by the historian Stepanos Orbelian (13th–14th centuries), Patriarch Baghak, one of the descendants of Sisak, receives the Dzork (Kapan) province as an inheritance, builds the Baghak’s Stone fortress, and fortifies the stronghold, naming it Baghaberd. As an impregnable fortress, it has been known since the 4th-5th centuries. The significance of Baghaberd increases especially during the 10th-12th centuries, in the period of the Kingdom of Syunik or Baghk.

Kapan becomes the capital of the Kingdom of Syunik when King Gagik I (989 - 1020)* campaigns against Syunik and captures the Vayots Dzor province, as a result of which the Kingdom of Syunik is confined within the borders of its southeastern provinces. Kapan was built in the section of the Voghjaget valley, with steep, forested gorges from the north, and the Arevik mountain range from the south (currently in the place called Tandzulendzh). The east-west axis of Kapan, along which stretched the Artsakh-Tatev-Meghri-Ortuat road passing through the river valley, was the only sparsely fortified direction of the city. The military strongholds built back in the early Middle Ages—Baghabegh in the west, Baghaku Kar (Baghak's Stone) in the southwest, Halidzor Fortress (17th century) in the east, and Kkots Kar in the northeast—made the eastern and western approaches of the city secure. The more extensive defense system consisted of fortresses and strongholds placed at certain distances from each other along all the roads of military significance leading to Kapan, which created a dense network of military strongholds around the city and formed an enclosed ring with a radius of approximately 10 km, in the center of which the administrative center was located.

Two roads passed through the north of Baghaberd. One of them came from the direction of Barkushat and Achen and stretched toward Arevik and Goghtn. The other originated right from Baghaberd and stretched toward Tatev. Two other roads—one from the west, the other from the southwest—were also part of Kapan's defense system. Along the Tatev-Baghaberd road, the fortresses of Tsur, Berd-Aveladasht, Tandzavayr, Gandzaberd, Achaghva, Kkots Kar, and Baghaberd were located; the western road was guarded by the Geghi and Zeva fortresses; the southwestern one by Shlorut; and the southeastern one by the Gohar, Krnas, Berdaqar, and Halidzor fortresses. The strongholds of military significance placed along the road leading from Kapan to Baghaberd formed the capital's monocentric defense system. It consisted of a main militarized center, around which units of various defensive purposes spread out as additional, completing elements. When the defense system of the capital city of Kapan was being created, all favorable physiographic conditions were taken into account. The river valleys, mountain ranges, plateaus, and gorges, together with the military construction structures, created a dense, impregnable protected zone, which, in its turn, was connected with other defense systems formed in the provinces of Goghtn, Arevik, and Kovsakan from the south, and Chahuk, Tsghukk, and Haband from the north. Before being established as the main center of the monocentric defense system of the city of Kapan, Baghaberd had been the inaccessible fortress of the world of Syunik and served as a military stronghold—a place for temporary shelter and refuge during various political clashes.

"Shapur, the son of Hormizd, again conducted a mobilization of the entire multitude of the army of Persia, the land of the Aryans, that is, Khorasan, and went to wage war against Baghaberd; but due to the strength of the place, he was unable to do anything, because by rolling stones downhill from the fortress, they were destroying everyone altogether".

"... in history it is often seen that when the inhabitants of the country wanted to flee, they would fortify themselves herein"

In the mid-4th century, Prince Andok of Syunik, by fortifying himself in Baghaberd—the safest place in Syunik—manages to successfully repel three assaults by the troops of the Persian King Shapur and subsequently depart from Baghaberd.

In the year 853, Bugha, after pillaging Dvin, campaigns against Syunik with the aim of capturing Prince Vasak (Vasak Ishkhanik) and his brother, Ashot, who fortify themselves in the impregnable fortresses of Baghk.

"But many of the lord-governors, having turned to and gathered in the impregnable fortress of Baghk, escaped from the hands of the oppressors."

In the 10th century, Bishop Hakob of Syunik "rebels" against the supremacy of Catholicos Anania Mokatsi and finds refuge in Baghaberd, where he lives for 10 years until his death. Subsequent information about Baghaberd refers to the period of the Kingdom of Syunik. During the reign of the kingdom, the fortress gains a more important significance and forms a part of the defense system of the capital city of Kapan. In 1103, the Seljuk Turks, under the leadership of Emir Chortman, capture Kapan through treachery, while the attempts to capture Baghaberd end in failure.

"... in the year 552 (1103), when suddenly, while the citizens were in carelessness, the Lord delivered up Kapan city, which was impregnable by men; and the accursed Chortman, because of his malice, at an unexpected hour poured down upon the city..."

"... but against the fortress they were able to undertake nothing; instead, they departed."

After the destruction of Kapan, Baghaberd becomes the capital of the Kingdom of Syunik. If prior to the Kingdom of Syunik, Baghaberd had served as an impregnable shelter where large military units could reliably take refuge from the enemy, then during the period of the kingdom, the fortress becomes the royal seat and, through the defense system of around a dozen surrounding fortresses, becomes the most impregnable stronghold of Syunik. After the destruction of Kapan, the immense riches and manuscripts of the Tatev Monastery and the kingdom are concentrated here.

"... and because of its impregnable strength, they had accumulated there the holy relics, books, and church vessels from all the monasteries; and even more so, the countless and peerless holy relics and vessels of the church of Tatev—the wealthy and rich see—crosses and reliquaries of gold and silver, and adorned with precious stones and infinite pearls, and many testaments [manuscripts] which in number were more than 10,000, which they had stored there."

The historian Vardan has accounts attributed to the 10th century regarding Baghaberd, who, on the occasion of the founding of Vahanavank by Vahan, the son of Prince Jevansher of Syunik, writes:

"... Lord Vahan of Baghk, son of Prince Juansher, who built the most splendid sanctuary, the monastery of Hovhannes, at the foot of the inaccessible fortress of Baghk."

On the occasion of the construction of Vahanavank, Kirakos Gandzaketsi also mentions Baghaberd.

During the reign of Hasan, in the year 1126, Emir Haron attacks the Kingdom of Baghk, capturing Kakavaberd and Baghakakar. As St. Orbelian notes, with the capture of Kapan (the year 1103), the Kingdom of Baghk weakens, and gradually the territory of the principality shrinks. One year after the destruction of Kapan, in 1104, the enemy captures Vorotan; in 1105, Shlorut; in 1157, Meghri; and in 1166-1169, Grham, Geghi, and Kakavaberd. Only 67 years after the capture of the capital city of Kapan, in 1170, the troops of Atabeg Eldiguz manage to infiltrate the fortress by deceit and capture Baghaberd, which had remained impregnable throughout the centuries. Regarding the capture of the fortress, the historian of the House of Syunik writes:

"And he delivered the refuge of all and the place of shelter, the impregnable fortress of Baghaberd, into the hands of the cursed and night-prowling Ishmaelite man, who had come with a great army and was able to devise nothing. Then, with deceptive words, he tricked the simple-minded Christian men of Achaghva, and through them, he first took Kkots Kar, and then at night, by means of those men, he stole Baghaberd, and having taken it, he slaughtered [them] severely..."

The historians later remain silent about the fortress. In this regard, Alishan wrote: "... Kapan and Baghaberd are no longer mentioned... only the status [as a region] of being called Baghaberd remains, and remains until now"

Historians do not provide clear information about the location of Baghaberd; even Gh. Alishan, in the map attached to his work "Sisakan," does not precisely indicate the position of Baghaberd, the Baghaku Kar (Baghak's Stone) located not far from it, and the city of Kapan. According to St. Orbelian, Baghaberd was founded by a certain Baghak of Syunik: "... a certain one from the lineage of Sisak, named Baghak, having taken this province as a share of inheritance, builds the fortress of the Stone of Baghak, which is called Baghak's Stone, and fortifies the stronghold and names it Baghaberd, and the province was called Baghats province after his name"

The author places the fortress in the Baghats province. In a broad sense, the Baghk province was also called the "World of Baghats," which included the Dzork, Kapan, and Arevik provinces. In another reference by St. Orbelian, Baghaberd is placed in the Dzork province: "Tenth: Dzork province, which holds the inaccessible stronghold of Baghaberd, and is now called Kapan"

This report by the chronicler is explained by the fact that Baghaberd was located in the border area of the Baghk and Dzork provinces, and starting from the 10th century (during the time of the Kingdom of Baghk), the Dzork province entered into its borders, while Kapan was considered the capital of the kingdom. "He held in his portion the Baghats province and the city of Kapan"

== Culture ==
A few traditional legends and myths associated with Baghaberd have been preserved among the locals. The more famous among them is the "Spring of Pharandzem." According to tradition, the queen's youth was spent in Baghaberd. Near the western walls of the fortress, a spring used to flow, where the queen loved to stroll and enjoy the cold water of the spring. This served as a basis for the local inhabitants later on to form a tradition, according to which Armenian mothers bathed their children with the water of that spring and made them drink that water, believing that the girls would be beautiful and persistent like Pharantzem, and the boys would be strong and resilient. They say that Queen Pharantzem, even while being in captivity, carried herself so boldly and proudly that the Persian King Shapur was astonished, having never before encountered such a powerful queen. Currently, that spring no longer exists, but it has been preserved in the memory of the people. A few kilometers to the east of Baghaberd is located the former capital of the Kingdom of Syunik, Kapan, with its citadel. Several fortresses in the area were the ones ensuring the security of the capital. The novella "Baghaberd," authored by prose writer and translator Sergey Urumyan, is also about the 11th-century historical-political events of Syunik, presenting the prevailing political situation of that period and the battles fought during the days of Seljuk rule.

== Structure ==
Baghaberd is situated at the confluence of the Voghjaget and Giratagh rivers, at a height of 200 m from the riverbed. The construction of the promontory, corresponding to its foot, is carried out on 3 levels. The first row of fortress walls, which is located on the lowest elevation mark, is near the riverbed of the Giratagh River, at the foot of the immense western rocky slope, of which a vertical section about 60 m in length has been preserved. It concealed the lower, wide section of the natural watershed line existing between the inaccessible fortress rocks, through which it was possible to ascend and appear in the citadel of the fortress from the western side. The second zone of fortress walls is about 150 m higher than the latter. Here, on a vertical rock mass, is placed a semicircular, hollow watchtower, the northern corner of which is coupled with a section of the fortress wall forming a right angle. On the west-facing wall of the tower, a rectangular observation slit (loophole) with walls widening inward has been preserved. From the watchtower, it was possible to keep the vast area of the Voghji river valley under surveillance and monitor the enemy's troop movements.To the south of this group of fortress walls, traces of a winding fortress wall are noticeable, which also conceal the corridor widening upward along the watershed line—from the southeast. The eastern section of the fortress site is a forested hill, which rises with a smooth surface toward the rock-covered summit and couples with the neck of the promontory's mountain range. In this section, which is devoid of natural obstacles, stretch the towered fortress walls of the stronghold, which, extending from south to north, turn toward the northwest in the south, enclosing within themselves the only hollow tower built on the crest of the rock. The latter, due to its positioning, is barely noticeable from the main highway (currently Kapan-Kajaran), thanks to which the tower kept the accessible western direction approaching the fortress within its field of vision for surveillance. This extensive zone of fortress walls is built on the highest level from the riverbed. It is a broken line composed of vertical sections, in almost all corners of which five thick-stemmed, pyramidal buttress-towers, semicircular in plan, are placed. The latter are grouped in the northern section of the fortress wall and have various dimensions (7 m - 12 m). The southwestern section of the fortress wall, which is not fortified with towers and where the only, now half-ruined entrance of the fortress is located, is thicker. The solid tower placed on the northern side of the entrance is the largest in its dimension (12 m), since it was used as a control-combat tower protecting the entrance. The enemy, who could approach this side, would fall under a flanking blow from the right, while on the left side there was no place to retreat, because the bottomless gorge began here. Slightly below the tower is placed one of the two embrasures (firing ports), which is now half-ruined. The orientation of this embrasure is also connected with ensuring the security of the entrance's defense. Perhaps the application of these two techniques could have been sufficient to keep the entrance of the fortress unassailable, but entry blind alleys (dead ends), which found wide distribution in Armenian fortress-building, are also used here. The fortress wall of the entrance section of the stronghold is built in such a way that the enemy, when stepping inside from the entrance, would find themselves in front of the vertical rock mass opposite them. In the inner section, the fortress wall, forming an angle, narrows the possible passageway leading to the citadel, through which one could pass only in 1–2 rows. This narrow corridor created between the fortress wall and the rock, where the enemy could find themselves, was also protected by a guard-tower placed on the crest of the rock and an embrasure placed on the right side of the entrance. This embrasure has a rectangular outline in plan, which terminates outward with an exedra (apse). That small volume was covered with a vault, and in the exedra part, with a semi-spherical semi-dome (conch). The lateral, longitudinal walls of the embrasure continue perpendicularly inward from the surface of the fortress wall and lean on the rock. Such a composition of the embrasure made it possible to conduct combat operations in two directions, at an angle, and to block the advance of the enemy that had appeared inside from the entrance.

The inner space of the citadel, formed by the one-sided section of the fortress walls surrounding the summit of Saraost and by the western rock-wall, is currently concealed by a thick layer of soil. In this vast area ($150\text{ m} \times 50\text{ m}$), only the traces of insignificant structures have been preserved. In the western corner of the citadel, about 13 m inward from the fortress walls, the remains of the walls of a rectangular structure measuring $10\text{ m} \times 12\text{ m}$ with thick walls (2 m - 2.5 m) have been preserved. It is positioned on a small hill and served as a watchtower monitoring the approaches of the northern military road. The eastern wall of the structure has been preserved to a height of about 2.5 m - 3 m, inside the walls of which, in a horizontal direction, certain sockets of logs have been preserved. In the area surrounding the watchtower, rectangular brick stones have been discovered. It is possible that the structure underwent renovation, during which brick was used as a building material. Inside the eastern fortress wall of the stronghold, directly adjoined to it, the pits of the sockets of certain rooms have been preserved, which are positioned from north to south. It is possible that these structures served as arsenals, storehouses, and cells. Baghaberd undoubtedly also had an underground passage and a water supply system. According to popular folk tales, the abundant spring coming out on the bank of the Voghjaget was once located inside the fortress. The entire zone of the fortress walls, having a length of 270 m, which is currently preserved to a height of 8 m, was constructed in three construction phases. The walls and towers of the stronghold are three-layered, constructed of basalt, semi-processed, irregular stones, with a middle layer of lime mortar (thickness: 1.20-2.50 m). In the masonry of the walls, horizontal courses are predominantly preserved. During a subsequent renovation of the fortress, for the purpose of strengthening the walls, the surrounding crevices of the irregular stones were closed with mortar, so that the bulging parts of the stones remained out of the plastered surfaces. To preserve the horizontal courses of the wall's stone rows, before constructing each new stone row, the base of the next stone row was leveled with flat, small stones. During construction, a movable scaffolding was used, the log sockets of which have been preserved in different sections, on the same level. When constructing the walls and towers, thick (15 cm - 20 cm) logs forming a corbel (console) were placed perpendicularly to the walls at a certain distance from each other—80 cm - 90 cm—on which, parallel to the wall under construction, the scaffolding rested. After constructing the given section of the wall, the corbel sections of the logs were cut off, and the scaffolding was identically moved to the upper elevation mark onto the logs previously left in the wall. In some sockets, the transformed remnants of the logs that served as the supports of the scaffolding have been preserved to this day. In the lower part of the wall located in the middle section of the eastern fortress wall, the semicircular base section of the tower, to a height of about 1 m, is laid with bricks having a rectangular outline, which are secured with lime mortar. The section of the fortress wall built near the riverbed of the Voghjaget, now preserved in a straight section, is also attributed to the third construction phase. It is assumed that this zone of the advanced wall (outer wall) was constructed when the capital of the Kingdom of Syunik was moved to Baghaberd after the capture of Kapan․

== Modern Period ==
Archaeological studies and excavations were recently taking place on the territory of the fortress. These important scientific works are being carried out by the archaeological expedition of the "Service for the Protection of Historical-Cultural Reserve-Museums and Historical Environment" SNCO of the MoESCS of the Republic of Armenia, under the leadership of Avetis Grigoryan, PhD in History. In order to get acquainted with the ongoing works, during the final days of the excavations, I visited Baghaberd accompanied by restoring architect Levon Vasilyan and archaeologist Gagik Sargsyan. The history of the fortress, built almost upon a rocky hill, goes back into the depths of centuries. Needless to say, if it is Syunik, then we must first turn to the historian of Syunik—the chronicler, theologian, poet, religious and political figure, archbishop and Metropolitan of Syunik (1287-1303) Stepanos Orbelian (approx. 1250 – 1303). Since the spring of 2024, archaeological studies and excavations have begun in Baghaberd. At the end of August 2025, the works were temporarily completed. The head of the expedition, Avetis Grigoryan, informed that the works are mainly carried out in the citadel, which occupies an area of about 6 hectares. We have already mentioned that Baghaberd has a centuries-old history, but the materials found and the structures uncovered through the excavations so far belong to the last period of the fortress's existence. During the conversation, the head of the expedition said: "The purpose of the excavations is to uncover the monuments hidden in the soil layer for the purpose of restoration. This is already the third week that our expedition is working in Baghaberd. The excavations were being carried out in the citadel of the fortress, in the upper and lower sections. In the lower section, the northern tower is being excavated, where a very interesting structure located within the tower has been uncovered. It is probably a kitchen room that existed in the 12th-13th centuries. Meanwhile, in the upper section, excavations are being carried out on the territory of a monumental structure. What has been uncovered is a very interesting structure with finely hewn travertine foundations, lined internally with fired brick. It most likely dates back to the 11th-12th centuries and was the palace complex of the princes of Syunik. Currently, a large hall is being excavated, on the southern and eastern sides of which there are 2 small rooms at a higher level than the floor. The excavations are continuing, and there will still be interesting discoveries. The archaeological materials found are not abundant, but they indicate the time period—the 11th-14th centuries. A hearth, 3 tadhirs (clay ovens), and large storage jars (karases) have been discovered, one of which was broken, and half-burnt wheat grains were spilled out. A jug and pots, fragments of faience and glazed vessels, metallic finds, nails, a knife, etc., were also found. Fragments of glazed tiles were also discovered, which were probably used to outwardly pave the structure uncovered in the upper section. There are also fragments of sculpted stones, which likewise belonged to some monumental structure." From the uncovered palace complex, 2 walls have been preserved in a half-ruined state, along with the foundations. Since the structure was founded on a slope, the foundations on the western side have not been preserved. Many earthquakes have occurred in this area over the centuries and have left their black mark on the fortress as well. The last one, the epicenter of which was very close to Baghaberd, occurred in 1968 and caused significant damage to the ancient site. Nevertheless, Avetis Grigoryan noted, hundreds of meters of walls and 5-6 towers have been preserved. Mostly young people from Kapan and Kajaran work with the archaeologists. Aside from having a job, their presence is also important in the sense that they get to know their native region better and will now also become the guardians of the monument. Avetis Grigoryan also added that the excavations, carried out in parallel with the restoration works, will have a continuation in different phases․

In the meantime, I walked around the territory of the fortress, passing beneath the walls. From below, the walls, and especially the towers, appear more prominent. On the southeastern side of the mountain slope supporting the fortress, in a lower section, there are vertical and quite high rocks, one of which is altar-shaped (apse-shaped) with an opening in the upper part. On the northeastern side of the slope, a fortress wall descends from the stronghold toward the left bank of the Giratagh River. Speaking about the restoration works of the fortress, restoring architect Levon Vasilyan said that the development of the restoration project will be completed at the end of the year, after which a tender will be announced. In addition to archaeological studies and excavations, the development of a project for the restoration of the historical and cultural layers of the fortress must be carried out. The fortress must also become an important center of tourism; in this regard, Levon Vasilyan said: "We will slightly complete the towers and the walls so that it has a more presentable appearance and is also visible from the road. We will construct paths and stairs." Showing the fortress wall descending from the stronghold toward the river, Levon Vasilyan noted that a bridge will be built over the river and the stairs will ascend upward so that tourists can climb up. In parallel with Baghaberd, the expedition of the Institute of Archaeology and Ethnography of the NAS RA, under the leadership of archaeologist Gagik Sargsyan, is conducting excavations in the royal palace of historical Kapan, the former capital of Syunik. In the coming days, the same expedition will begin excavations at the famous Vanandaberd in the area.

== See also ==
- List of castles and fortresses in Syunik Province
- Kingdom of Syunik
- Dzork
- Kapan
- Shlorut

== Gallery ==
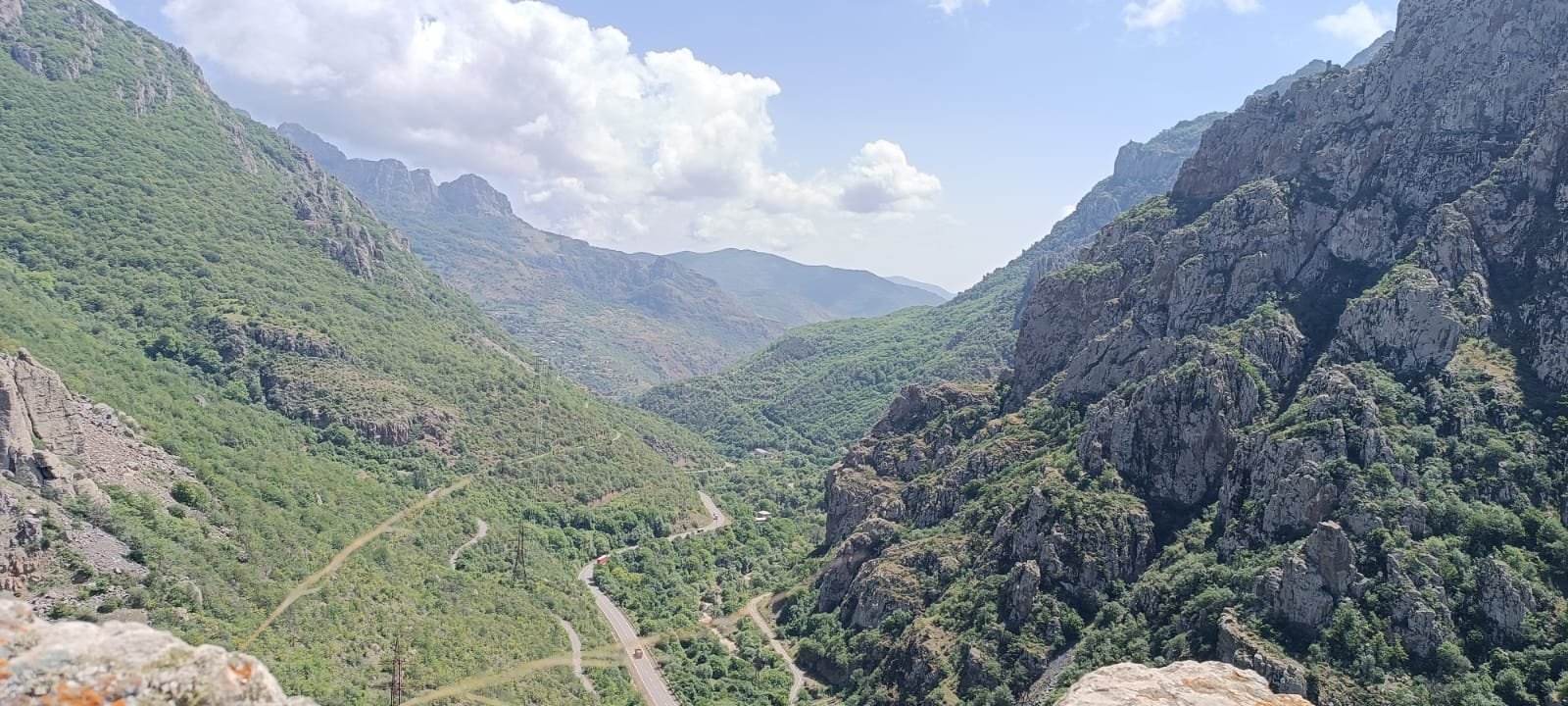

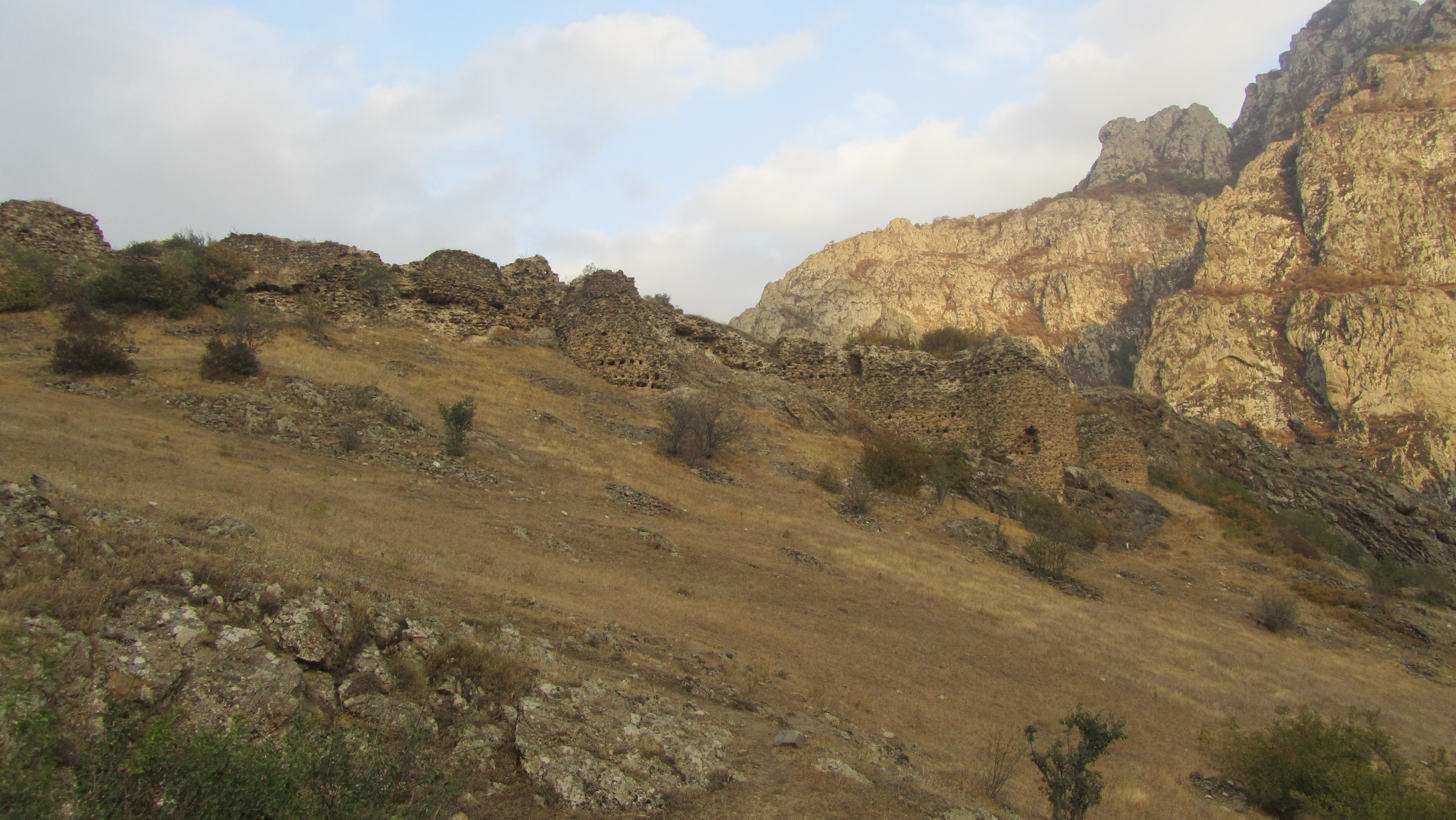

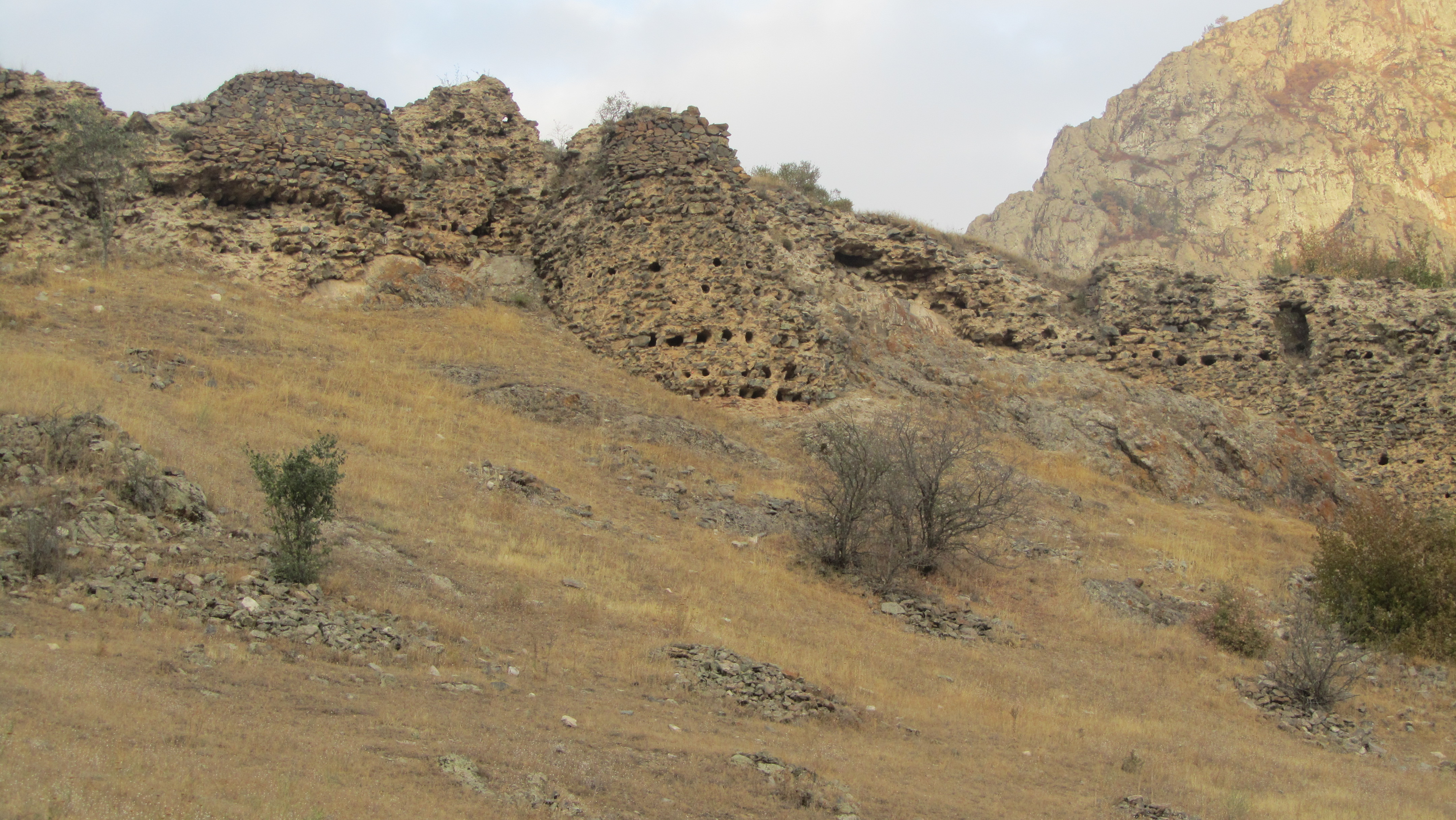

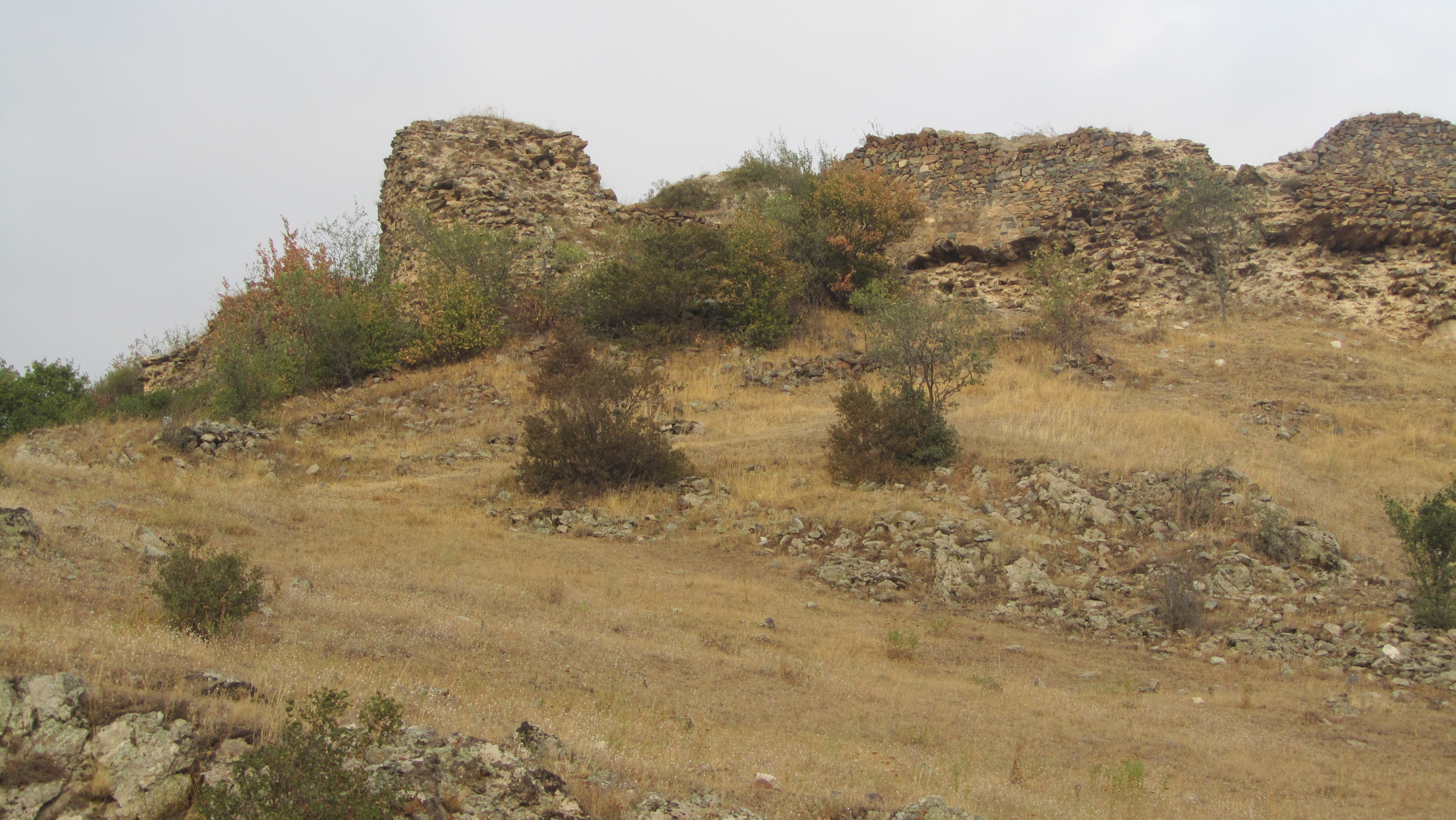

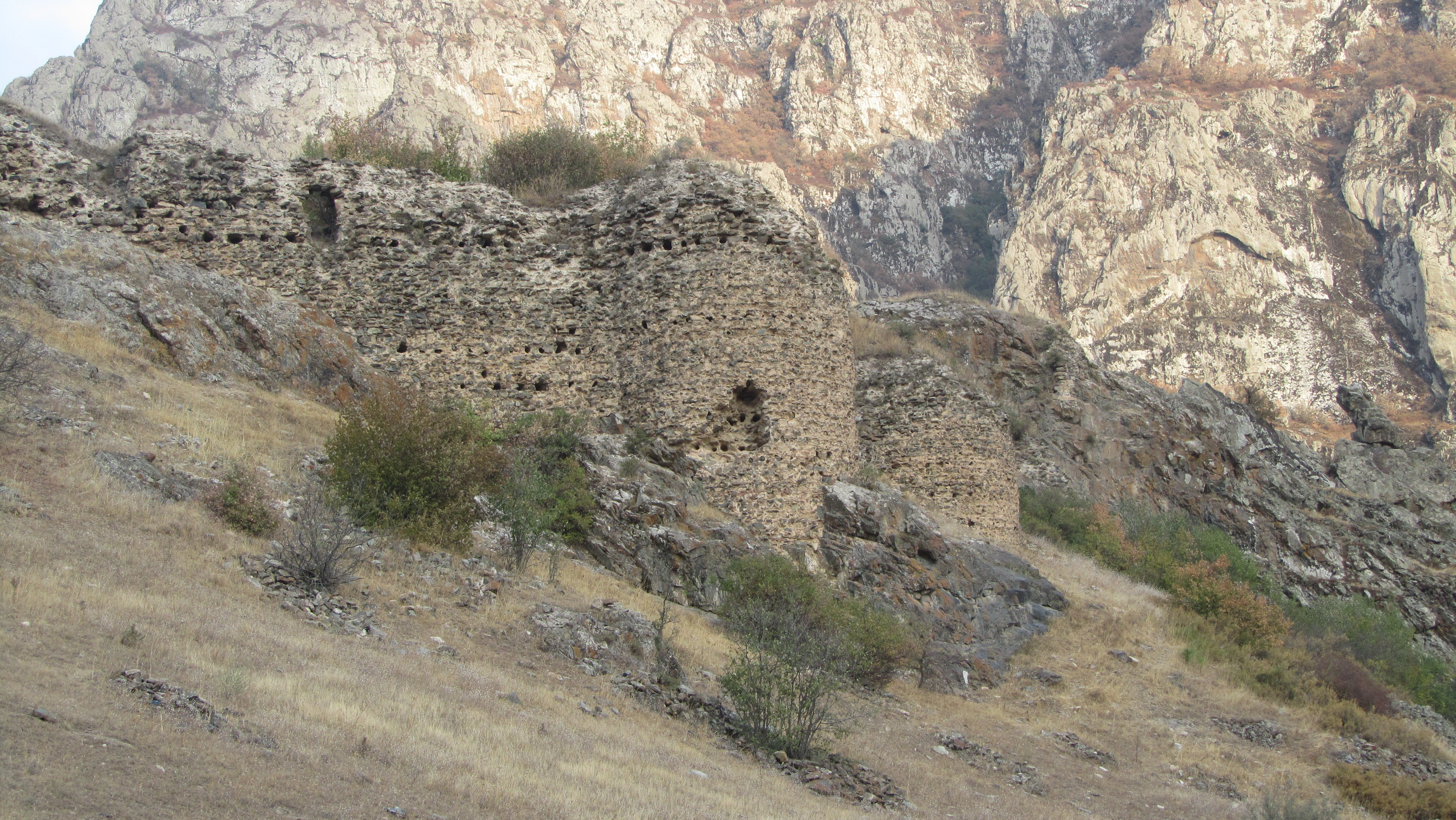

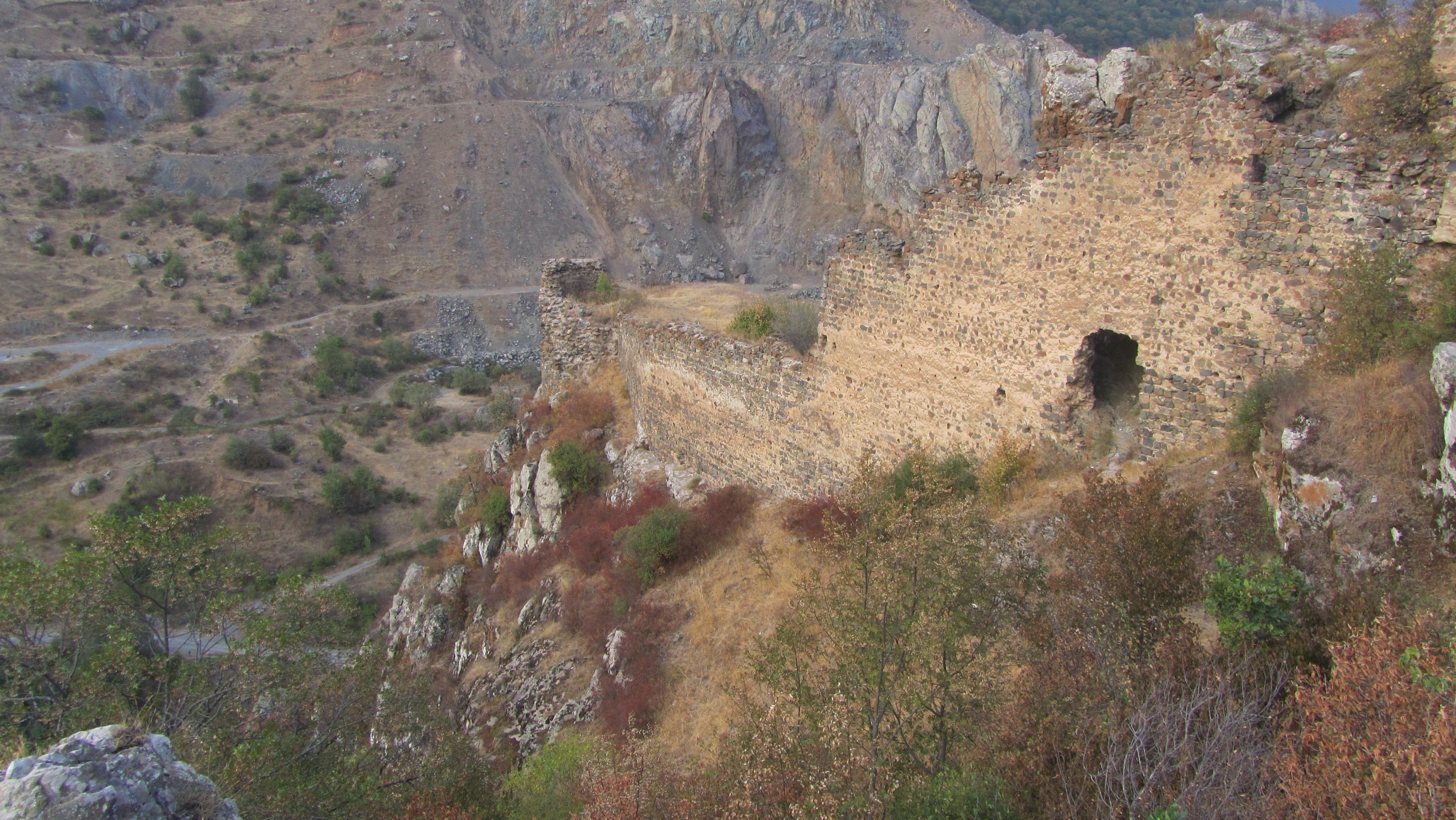

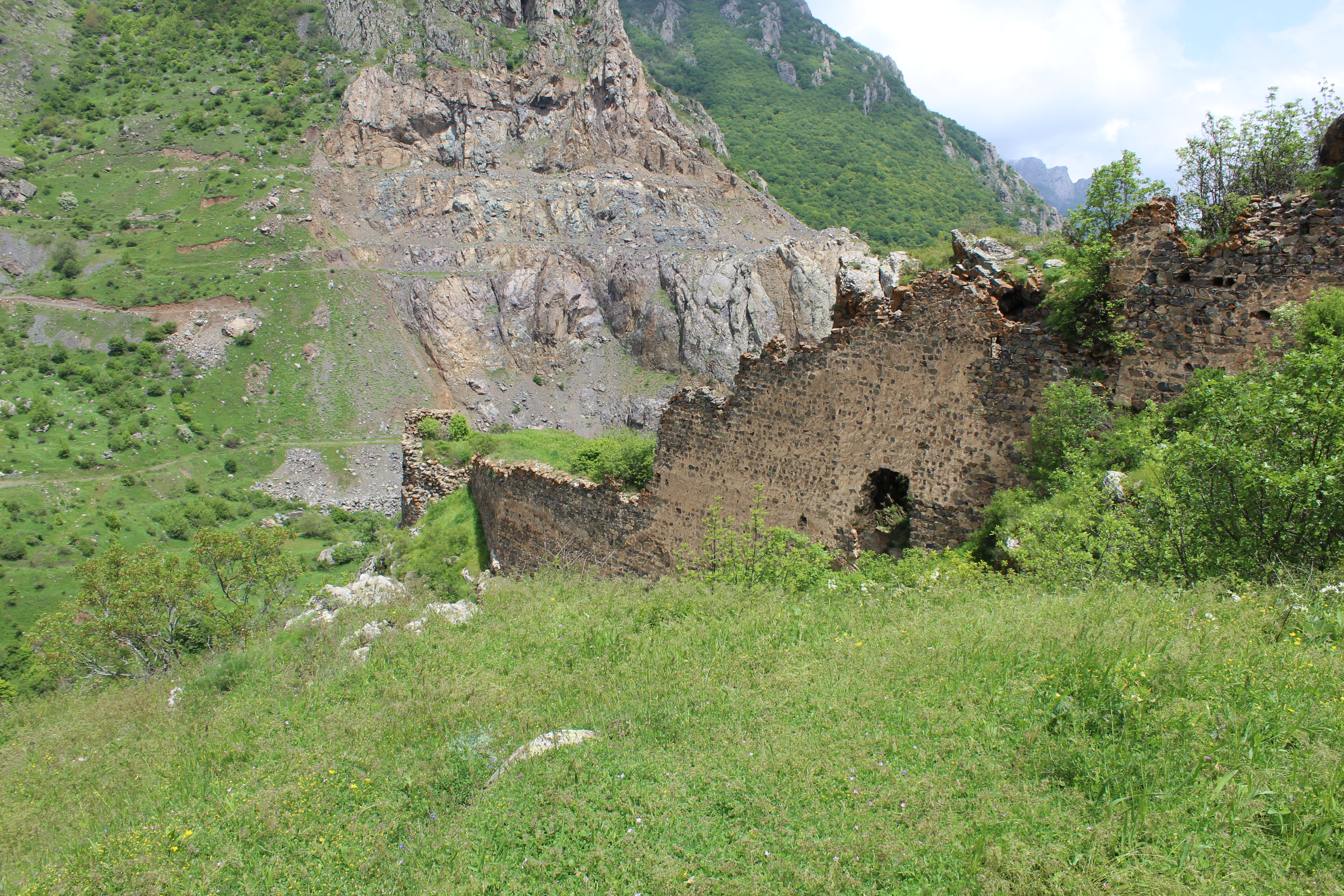

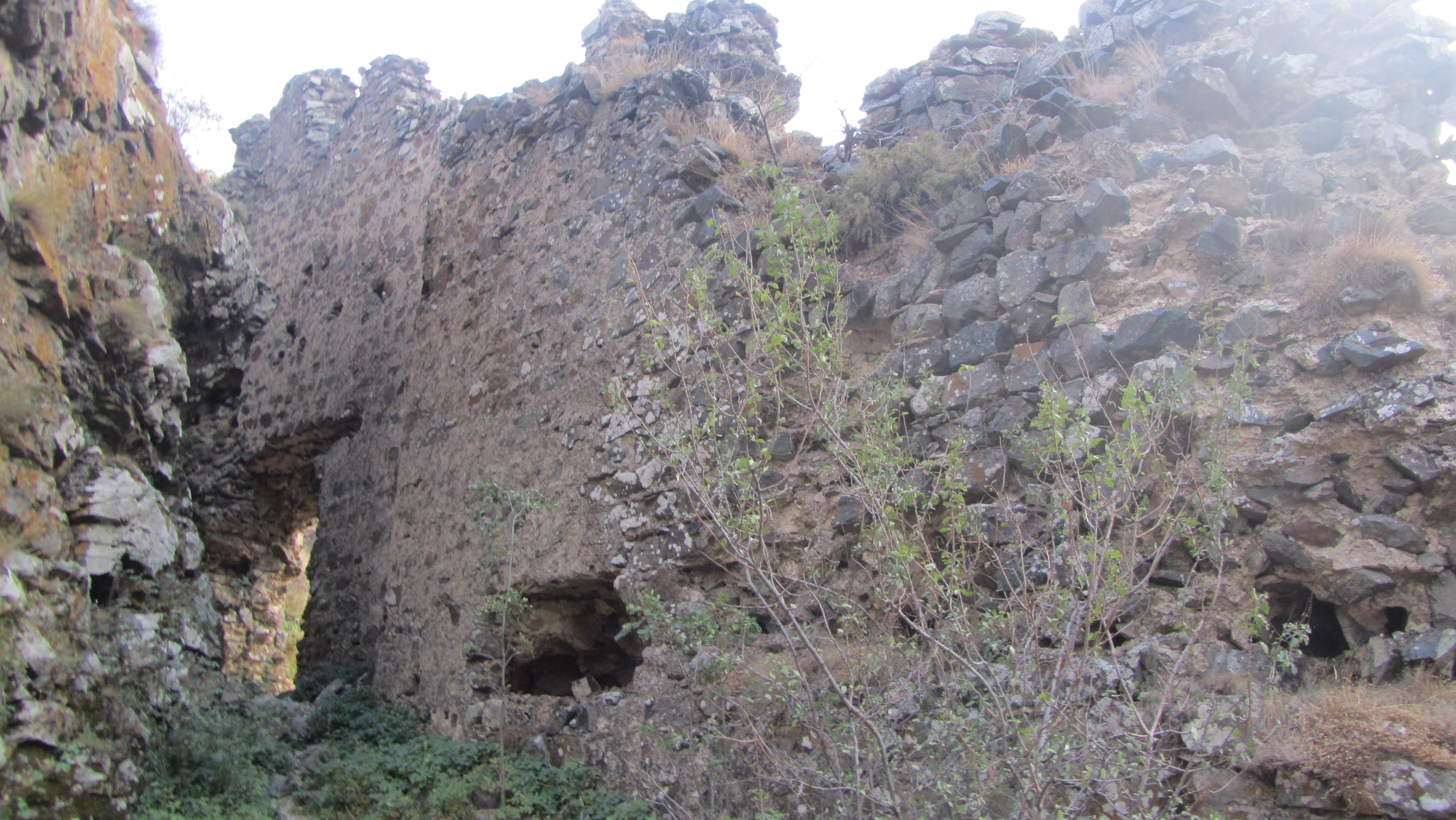

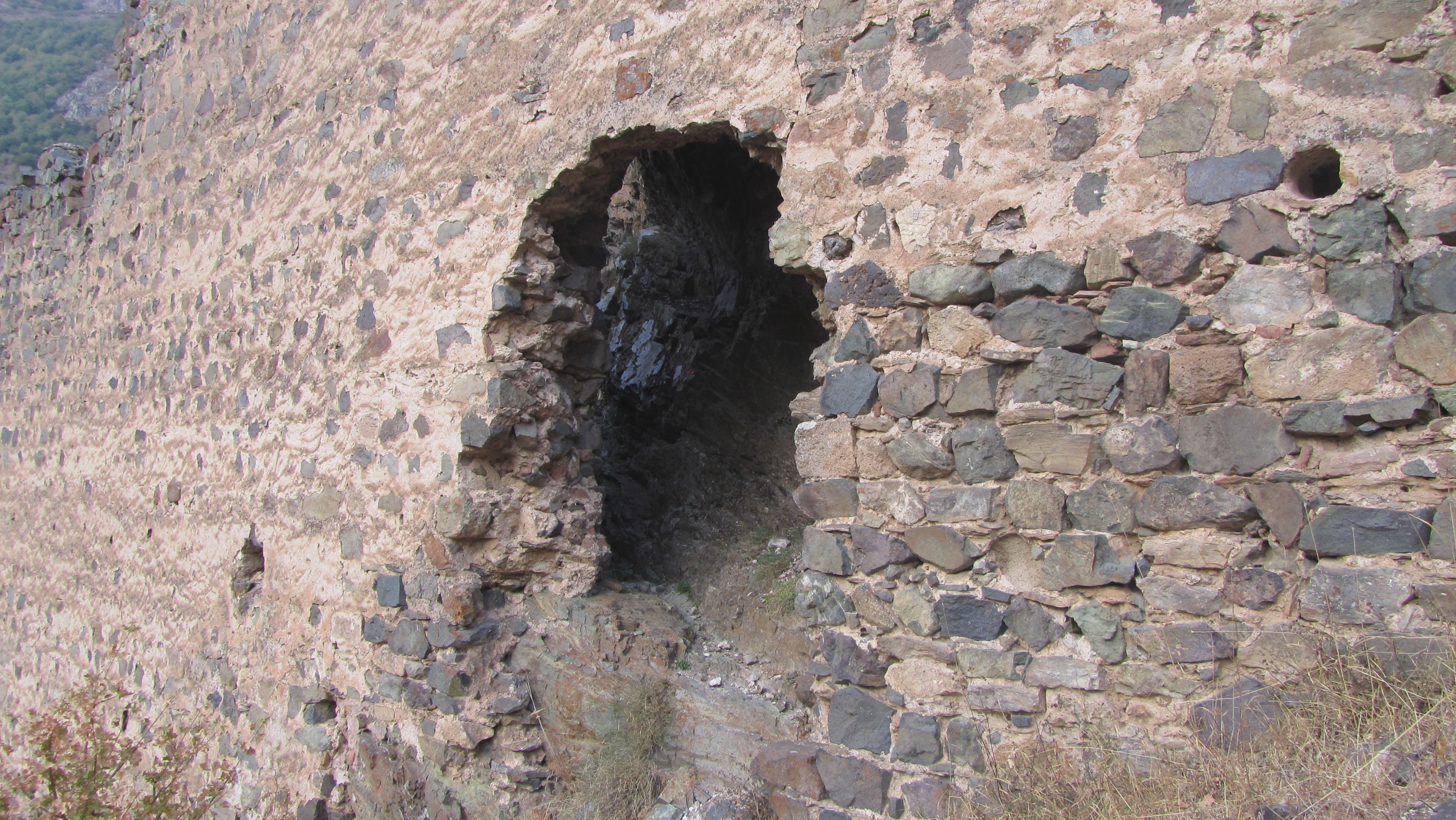

== Sources ==
Ալիշան, Ղևոնդ (1893). Sisakan: Teghagrutʻiwn Siwneatsʻ ashkharhi [Sisakan: geography of the province of Syunik] (in Armenian). Venice.

Yeghiazarian, H. (1955). Azizbekovi shrjani kulturayi hushardzannerě [The cultural monuments of Azizbekov district] (PDF) (in Armenian). Yerevan: Haypethrat. pp. 51–52.

Stone, Michael E.; Topchyan, Aram (2022). Jews in Ancient and Medieval Armenia: First Century BCE to Fourteenth Century CE. Oxford University Press. ISBN 9780197582077.

Kiesling, Brady (2005), Rediscovering Armenia: Guide, Yerevan, Armenia: Matit Graphic Design Studio

Kiesling, Brady (June 2000). Rediscovering Armenia: An Archaeological/Touristic Gazetteer and Map Set for the Historical Monuments of Armenia (PDF). Yerevan: Mattit. p. 103, 104. ISBN 9994101218. Archived from the original (PDF) on 6 November 2021.
