= Ajaran =

Ajaran may refer to:

- Ajaran, Armenia
- Ajaran people, an ethnographic subgroup of Georgians
