= Kuchumba =

Kuchumba may refer to:

- Kuchumba, alternate spelling of Kachumba, a creek and plain in South Australia

== See also ==
- Kuchuma
- Kombucha
