= Chirish =

- Location within Armenia
- Coordinates: 39°16′01″N 46°08′06″E
- Country: Armenia
- Marz (Province): Syunik
- Time zone: UTC+4 ( )

Chirish is an abandoned village in the Kajaran Municipality of Syunik Province of Armenia.

== See also ==
- Syunik Province
