= Pukhrut =

Pukhrut Փուխրուտ
- Location within Armenia Location within Syunik Province
- Coordinates: 39°07′37″N 46°13′30″E
- Country: Armenia
- Province: Syunik
- Municipality: Kajaran

Population (2017)
  - Total: 16
- Time zone: UTC+4 (AMT)

Pukhrut Village

Pukhrut (Armenian: Փուխրուտ) is a village in the Kajaran Municipality of the Syunik Province in Armenia.

== Demographics ==
Pukhrut was not listed in the 2011 Armenian census. However, following the 2017 reforms, Pukhrut appeared in the records with a total population of 16.

== Municipal administration ==
The village was part of the community of Lernadzor until the June 2017 administrative and territorial reforms, when the village became part of the Kajaran Municipality.
