= Tadevos Hakobyan =

Armenian historian and geographer (1917–1989)

- Թադևոս Հակոբյան
- Born: June 15, 1917; Lernadzor, Zangezur, Special Transcaucasian Committee, Russian Provisional Government
- Died: October 15, 1989 (aged 72); Yerevan, Armenian SSR, USSR
- Education: Doctor of Historical Sciences, Yerevan State University (1962)
- Occupation: Dean of the Faculty of Geography of YSU
- Employer: Yerevan State University
- Known for: History of Yerevan (1500-1800); Historical cities of Armenia
- Political party: Communist Party of Armenia

Tadevos Khachaturi Hakobyan (Armenian: Թադևոս Խաչատուրի Հակոբյան; 15 June 1917 – 15 October 1989) was a Soviet Armenian historian and geographer.

== Biography ==
Hakobyan was born in 1917 in the village of Lernadzor, now in Armenia's southern province of Syunik. In 1940, he graduated from the Faculty of Geography and Geology of Yerevan State University (YSU). In 1942–43, he fought in the Eastern Front of World War II. He was the dean of the YSU's Faculty of Geography in 1955–57 and 1963–65. He then served as the chair of that department from 1962 to 1986. Most of his work was focused on the historical geography of Armenia. Together with Stepan Melik-Bakhshyan and Hovhannes Barseghyan, he authored the monumental five-volume Dictionary of Toponomy of Armenia and Adjacent Territories (Հայաստանի և հարակից շրջանների տեղանունների բառարան). He also authored several textbooks.

== Selected works ==
- Syunikʻi tʻagavorut'yuně: Patma-ashkharhagrakan aṛumov Սյունիքի թագավորությունը․ Պատմա-աշխարհագրական առումով [The kingdom of Syunik: In historical-geographical context] (in Armenian). Yerevan: Mitkʻ. 1966.
- Hayastani patmakan ashkharhagrutʻyun Հայաստանի պատմական աշխարհագրություն [Historical geography of Armenia] (in Armenian). Yerevan: Mitkʻ. 1968.
- Erevani patmutʻyuně Երևանի պատմությունը [The history of Yerevan] (in Armenian). Yerevan University Press. 1959–1971. 4 vols.
- Ocherk istorii Erevana Очерк истории Еревана [Outline of the history of Yerevan] (in Russian). Yerevan University Press. 1977.
- Hay zhoghovrdi patmutʻyan hisharzhan vayrerě Հայ ժողովրդի պատմության հիշարժան վայրերը [Memorable locations of the history of the Armenian people] (in Armenian). Yerevan: Luys. 1978.
- Anii patmutʻyun Անիի պատմություն [History of Ani] (in Armenian). Yerevan University Press. 1980–1982. 2 vols.
- Ani - stolitsa srednevekovoĭ Armenii. Istoriia sudʹby gorodishcha Ани - столица средневековой Армении. История и судьба городища [Ani: The capital of medieval Armenia. The history and destiny of the settlement] (in Russian). Yerevan University Press. 1985.
- Hayastani ev harakitsʻ shrjanneri teghanunneri baṛaran Հայաստանի և հարակից շրջանների տեղանունների բառարան [Dictionary of Toponomy of Armenia and Adjacent Territories] (in Armenian). Co-authored with Stepan Melik-Bakhshyan and Hovhannes Barseghyan. Yerevan University Press. 1986–2001. 5 vols.
- Patmakan Hayastani kʻaghakʻnerě Պատմական Հայաստանի քաղաքները [Cities of historic Armenia] (in Armenian). Yerevan: Hayastan. 1987.
- Ani mayrakʻaghakʻ Անի մայրաքաղաք [Ani the capital] (in Armenian). Yerevan University Press. 1988.
