= Katnarat, Syunik =

Katnarat Կաթնառատ
- Location within Armenia Location within Syunik Province
- Coordinates: 39°08′07″N 46°12′24″E
- Country: Armenia
- Province: Syunik
- Municipality: Kajaran

Population (2017)
  - Total: 16
- Time zone: UTC+4 (AMT)

Katnarat (Armenian: Կաթնառատ) is a village in the Kajaran Municipality of the Syunik Province in Armenia.

== Demographics ==
Katnarat is not listed in the 2011 Armenian census, however, following the 2017 reforms, Katnarat village appeared in the records with a total population of 16.

== Municipal administration ==
The village was a part of the community of Lernadzor until the June 2017 administrative and territorial reforms, when the village became part of the Kajaran Municipality.
