= Andokavan =

Andokavan Անդոկավան
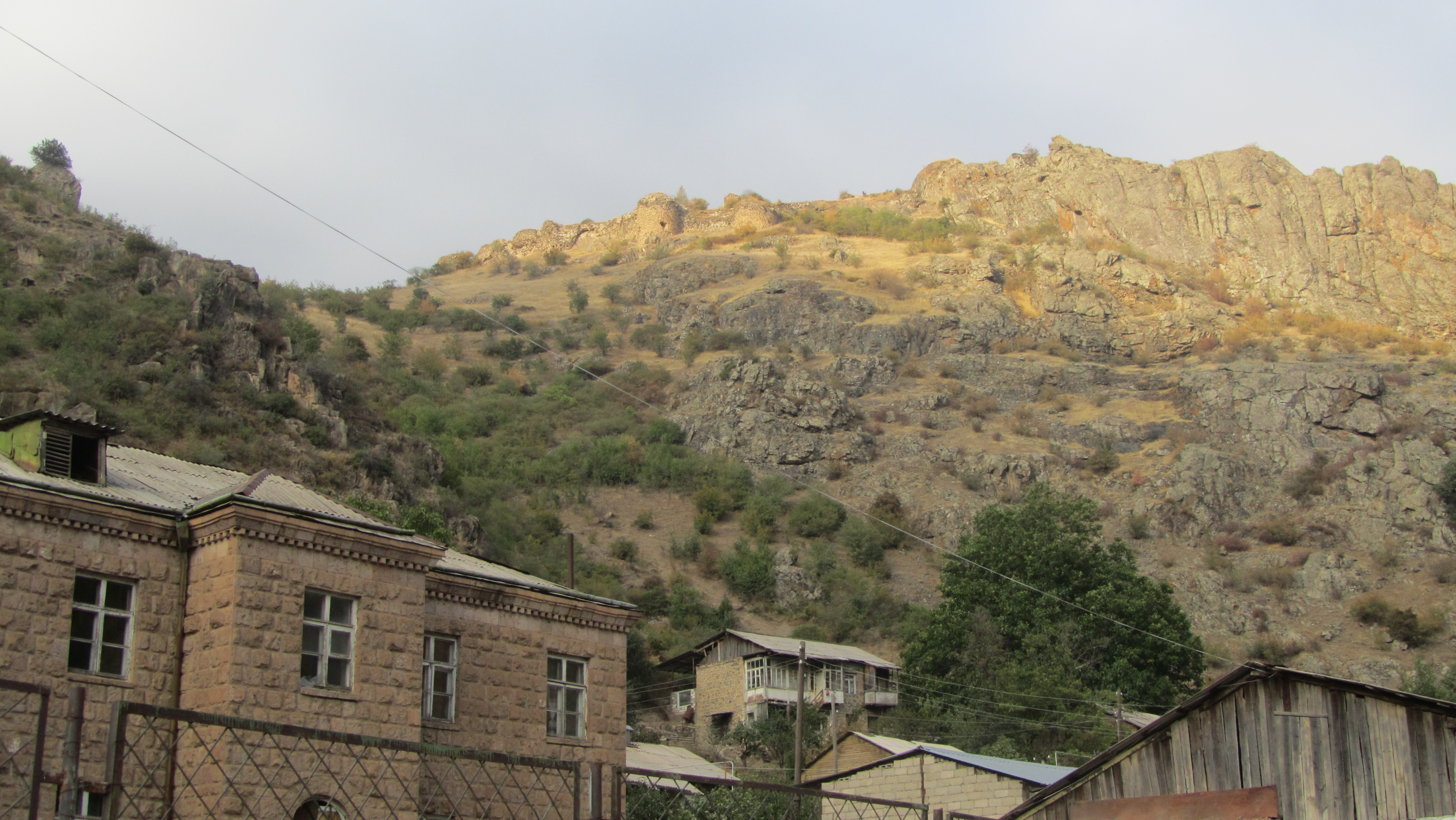

- Location within Armenia Location within Syunik Province
- Coordinates: 39°12′21″N 46°16′15″E
- Country: Armenia
- Province: Syunik
- Municipality: Kajaran

Population (2017)
  - Total: 118
- Time zone: UTC+4 (AMT)

Andokavan (Armenian: Անդոկավան) is a village in the Kajaran Municipality of the Syunik Province in Armenia. The 4th-century Baghaberd fortress is located close to Andokavan.

== Demographics ==
Andokavan was not listed in the 2011 Armenian census. However, following the 2017 reforms, Andokavan appeared in the records with a total population of 118.

== Municipal administration ==
The village was a part of the community of Lernadzor until the June 2017 administrative and territorial reforms, when the village became a part of the Kajaran Municipality.

== Gallery ==
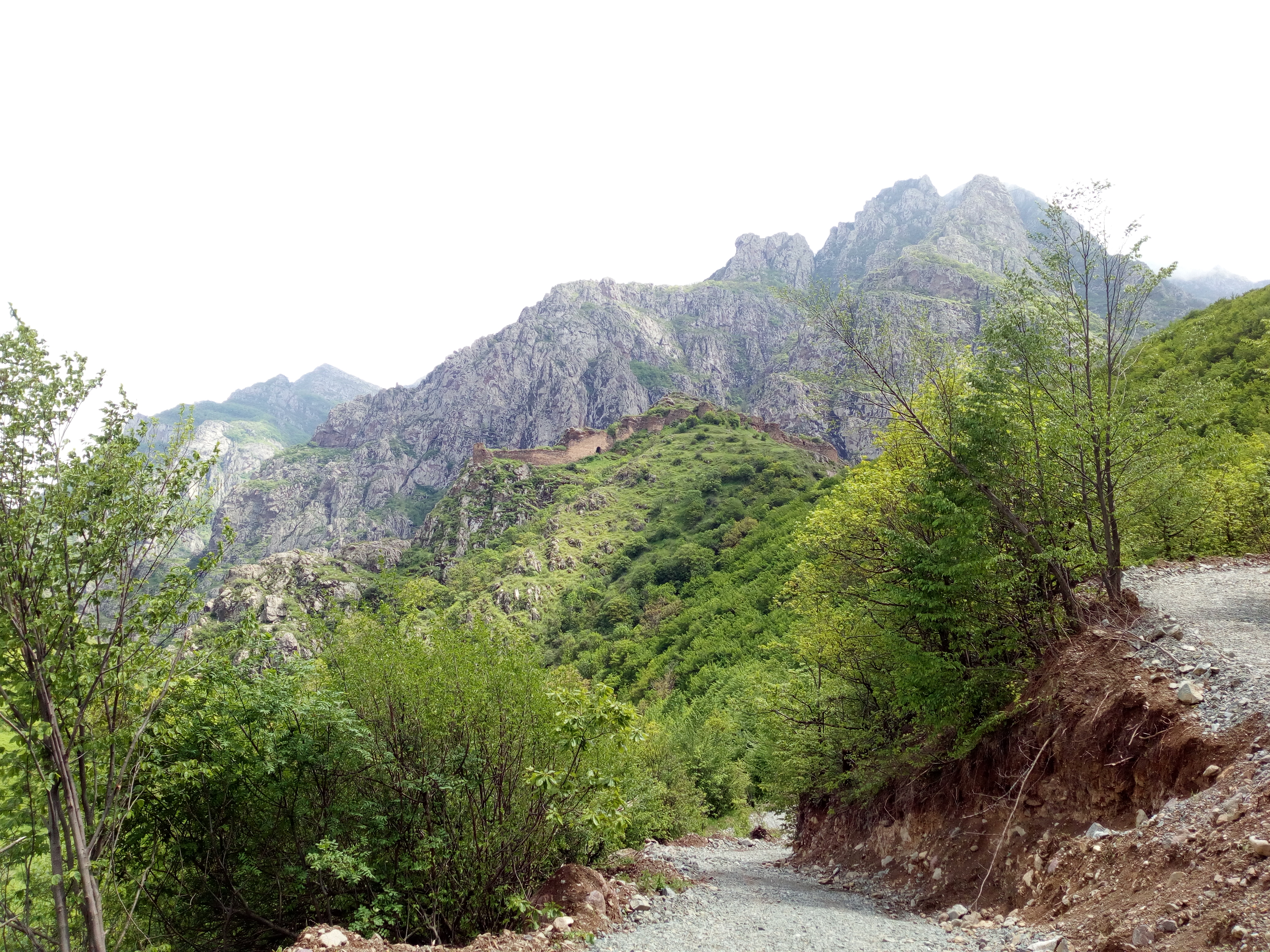

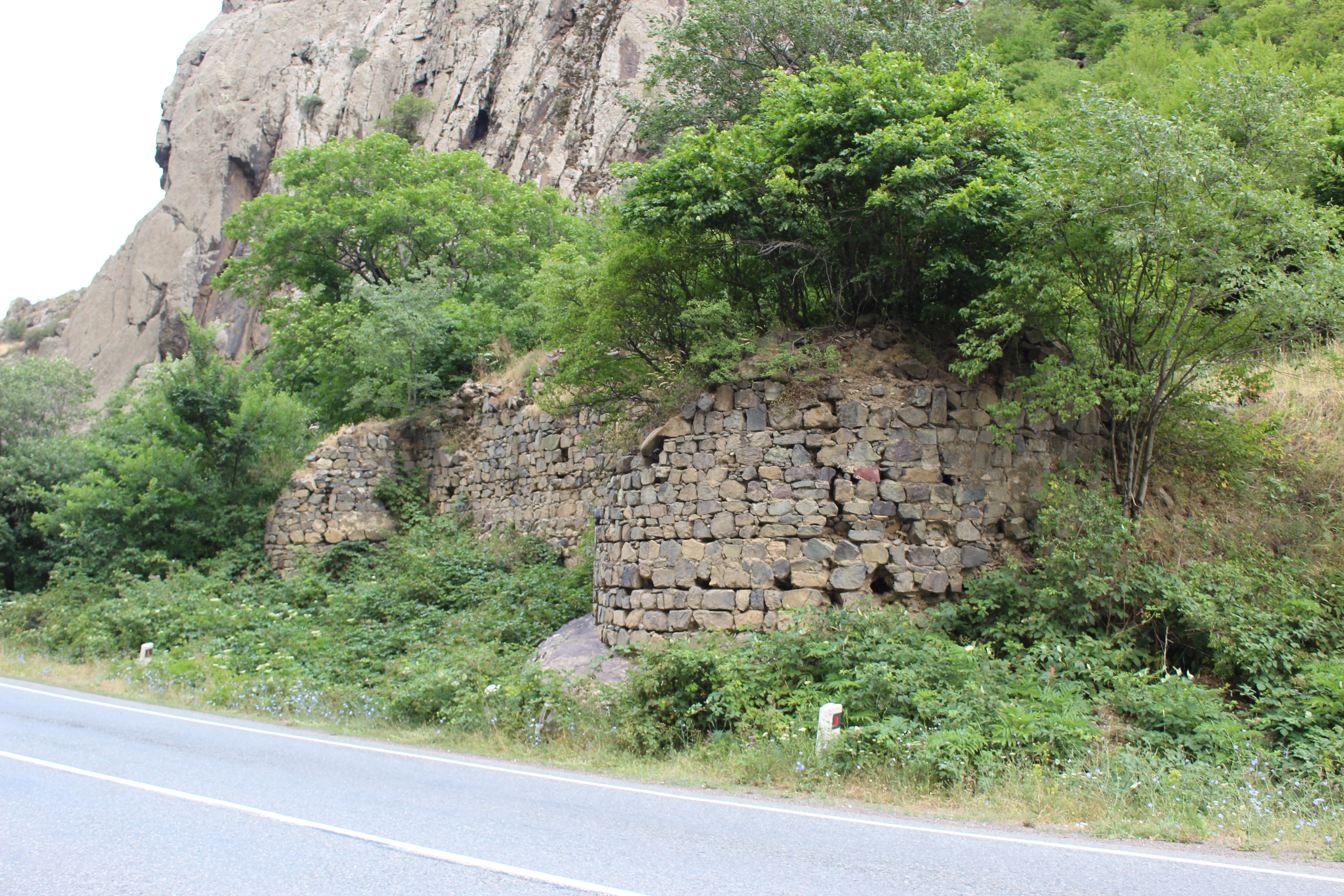

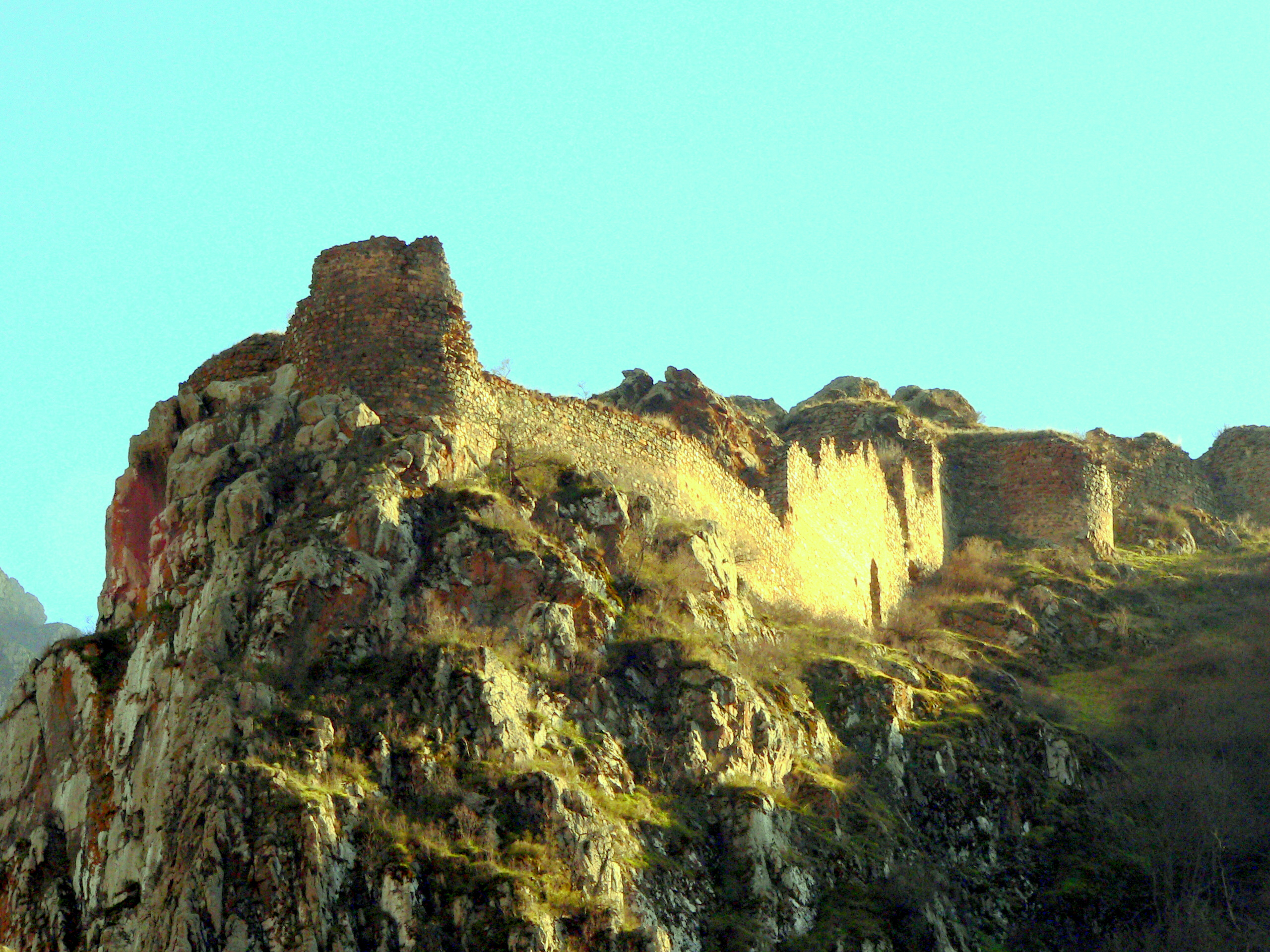
