= Babikavan =

Babikavan Բաբիկավան
- Location within Armenia Location within Syunik Province
- Coordinates: 39°09′07″N 46°11′27″E
- Country: Armenia
- Province: Syunik
- Municipality: Kajaran

Population (2017)
  - Total: 216
- Time zone: UTC+4 (AMT)

Babikavan (Armenian: Բաբիկավան) is a village in the Kajaran Municipality of the Syunik Province in Armenia.

== Demographics ==
Babikavan was not listed in the 2011 Armenian census. However, following the 2017 reforms, Babikavan appeared in the records with a total population of 216.

== Municipal administration ==
The village was a part of the community of Lernadzor until the June 2017 administrative and territorial reforms, when the village became a part of the Kajaran Municipality.
