= Ajylu =

Ajylu Açağu
- Location within Armenia Location within Syunik Province
- Coordinates: 39°09′39″N 46°17′15″E
- Country: Armenia
- Marz (Province): Syunik Province
- Time zone: UTC+4 ( )
  - Summer (DST): UTC+5 ( )

Ajylu (Azerbaijani: Açağu, anglicized: Achaghu) is a village in Syunik Province, Armenia. It is located about 4km south of Kuchuma. The village had an Azerbaijani-majority population before their exodus in 1968-69.
