= Nor Astghaberd =

Nor Astghaberd Նոր Աստղաբերդ
- Location within Armenia Location within Syunik Province
- Coordinates: 39°14′44″N 46°06′28″E
- Country: Armenia
- Province: Syunik
- Municipality: Kajaran

Population (2011)
  - Total: 57
- Time zone: UTC+4 (AMT)

Nor Astghaberd (Armenian: Նոր Աստղաբերդ) is a village in the Kajaran Municipality of the Syunik Province in Armenia.

== Toponymy ==
The village was previously known as Payahan (Armenian: Փայահան).

== Demographics ==
The population of the village of Nor Astghaberd was 53 in 2001, and 57 in 2011. The population of the community of Nor Astghaberd was 179 in 2001, 79 in 2009, 93 in 2010, and 172 in 2011.
