= Getishen =

Getishen Գետիշեն
- Location within Armenia Location within Syunik Province
- Coordinates: 39°13′41″N 46°07′45″E
- Country: Armenia
- Province: Syunik
- Municipality: Kajaran

Population (2011)
  - Total: 87
- Time zone: UTC+4 (AMT)

Getishen (Armenian: Գետիշեն) is a village in the Kajaran Municipality of the Syunik Province in Armenia.

== Toponymy ==
The village is also known as Getashen, and was also previously known as Chaykend (Armenian: Չայքենդ).

== Demographics ==
The village had a population of 96 at the 2001 census.
