= Kajaran (village) =

Kajaran Քաջարան
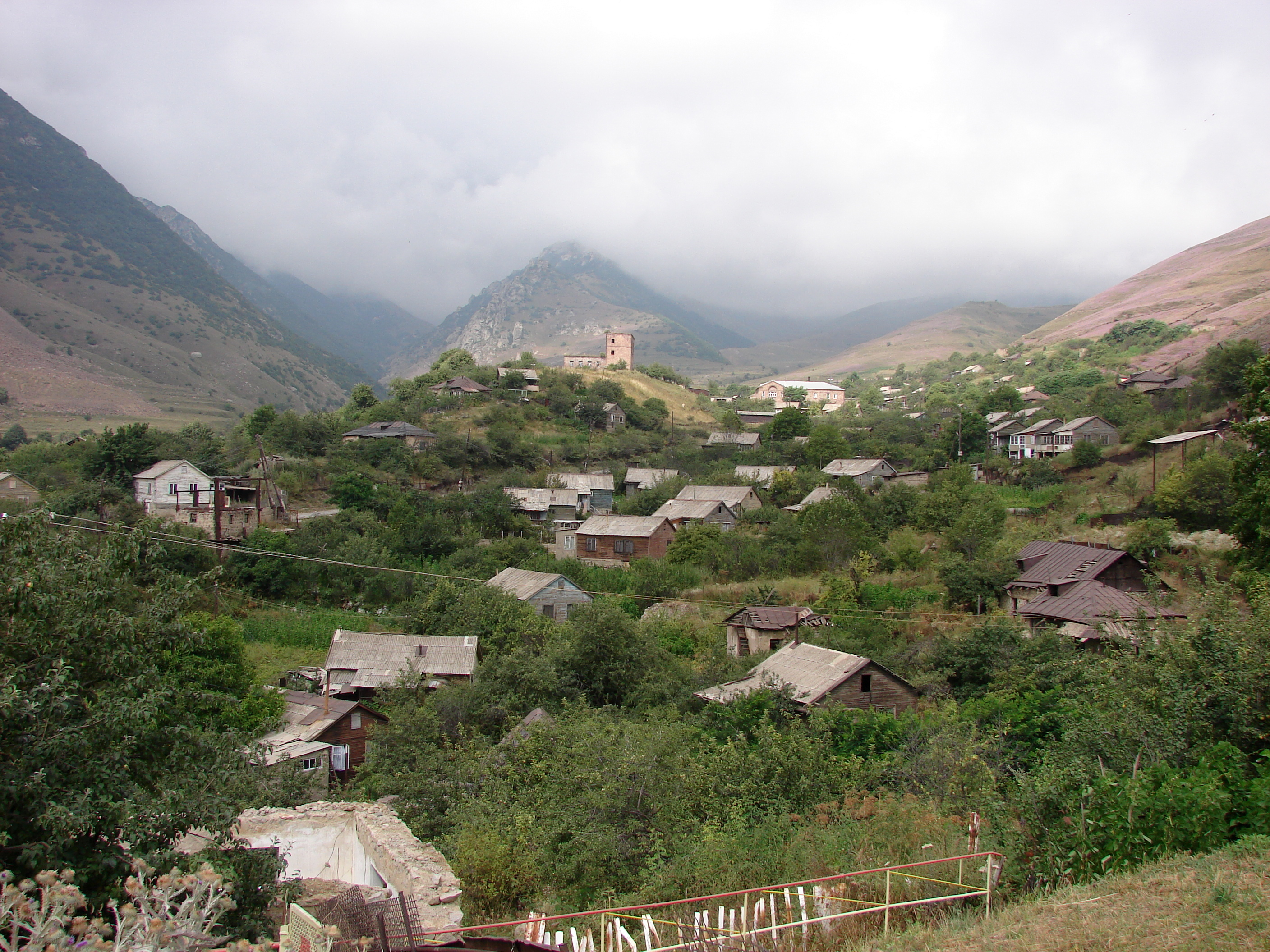

- Location within Armenia Location within Syunik Province
- Coordinates: 39°09′34″N 46°07′20″E
- Country: Armenia
- Province: Syunik
- Municipality: Kajaran

Area
  - Total: 12.30 km^{2} (4.75 sq mi)

Population (2011)
  - Total: 250
  - Density: 20/km^{2} (53/sq mi)
- Time zone: UTC+4 (AMT)

Kajaran (Armenian: Քաջարան) is a village in the Kajaran Municipality of the Syunik Province in Armenia. The village is home to the 17th-century Surb Hakob Church (Սուրբ Հակոբ Եկեղեցի).

== Toponymy ==
The village was historically known as Kajarants.

== Demographics ==
The Statistical Committee of Armenia reported its population was 212 in 2010. down from 223 at the 2001 census.

== Gallery ==
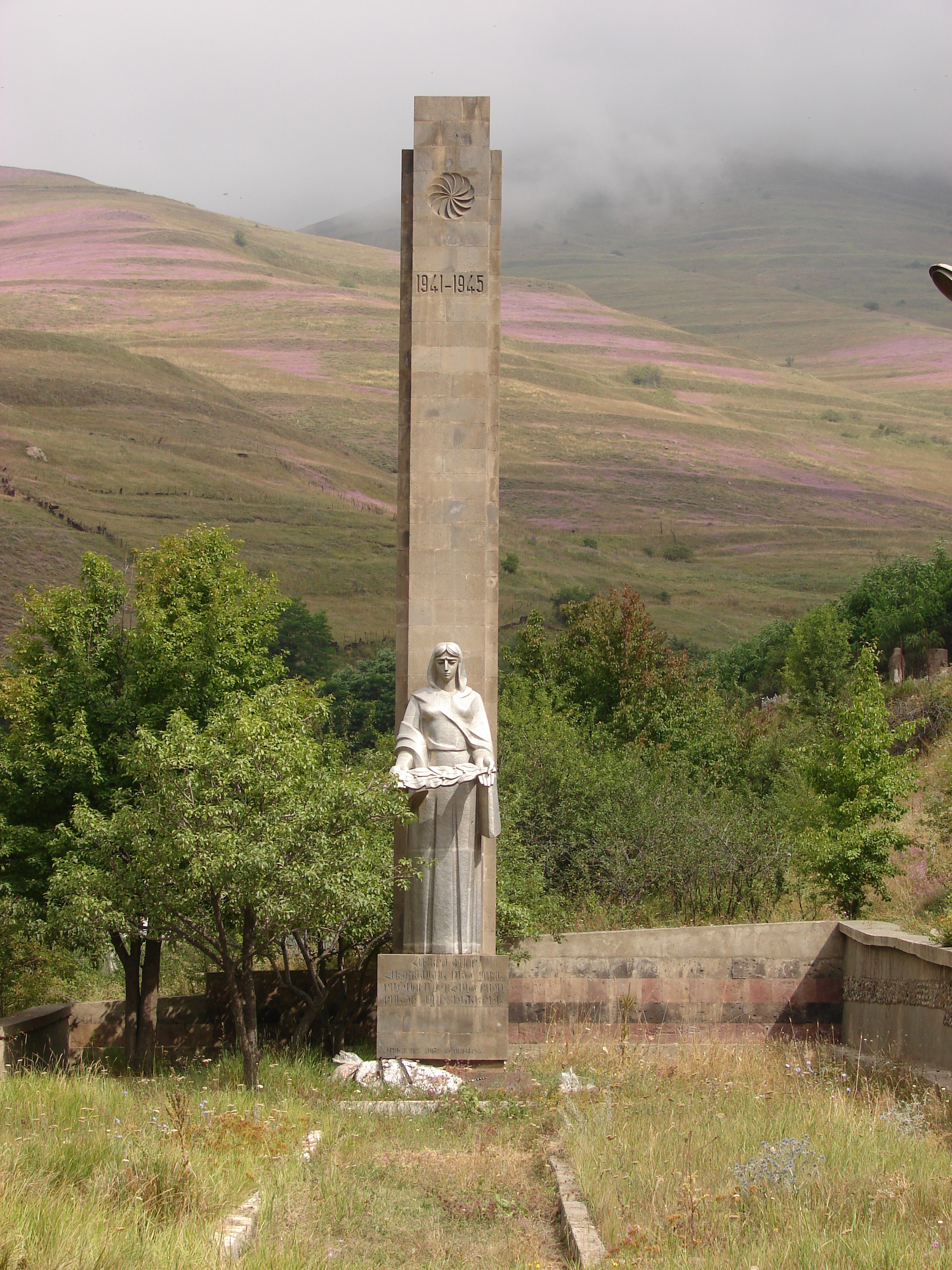
WWII monument

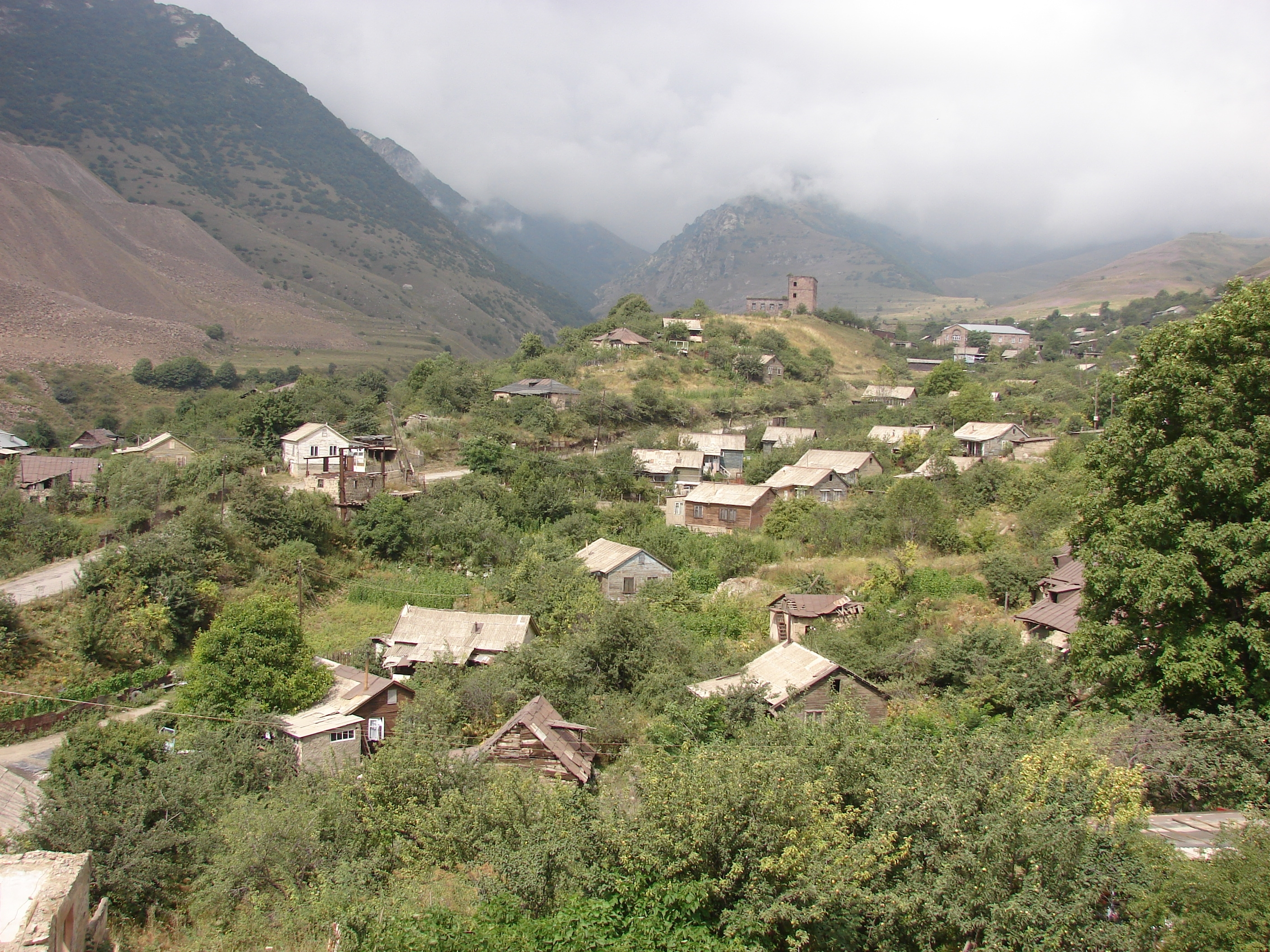
A view of the village
