= Kitsk =

Kitsk Կիցք
- Location within Armenia Location within Syunik Province
- Coordinates: 39°17′28″N 46°06′30″E
- Country: Armenia
- Province: Syunik
- Municipality: Kajaran

Population (2011)
  - Total: 0
- Time zone: UTC+4 (AMT)

Kitsk (Armenian: Կիցք) is an abandoned village in the Kajaran Municipality of Syunik Province of Armenia. At the 2001 census, Kitsk was part of the rural community of Karut.

== Demographics ==
The National Statistical Service of the Republic of Armenia (ARMSTAT) reported that the village was uninhabited at the 2001 and 2011 censuses.
