= Vocheti =

Vocheti Ոչեթի
- Location within Armenia Location within Syunik Province
- Coordinates: 39°12′14″N 46°08′19″E
- Country: Armenia
- Province: Syunik
- Municipality: Kajaran

Population (2011)
  - Total: 0
- Time zone: UTC+4 (AMT)

Vocheti (Armenian: Ոչեթի) is an abandoned village in the Kajaran Municipality in the Syunik Province of Armenia.
