= Dzagikavan =

Dzagikavan Ձագիկավան
- Location within Armenia Location within Syunik Province
- Coordinates: 39°11′18″N 46°15′14″E
- Country: Armenia
- Province: Syunik
- Municipality: Kajaran

Population (2011)
  - Total: 132
- Time zone: UTC+4 (AMT)

Dzagikavan (Armenian: Ձագիկավան) is a village in the Kajaran Municipality of the Syunik Province in Armenia. In 1988 Armenian refugees deported from Azerbaijan settled in the village.

== Municipal administration ==
The village was a part of the community of Lernadzor until the June 2017 administrative and territorial reforms, when the village appeared as Dzagikavan as part of the Kajaran Municipality.
