= Kajaran Municipality =

Kajaran Քաջարան
- Urban Community
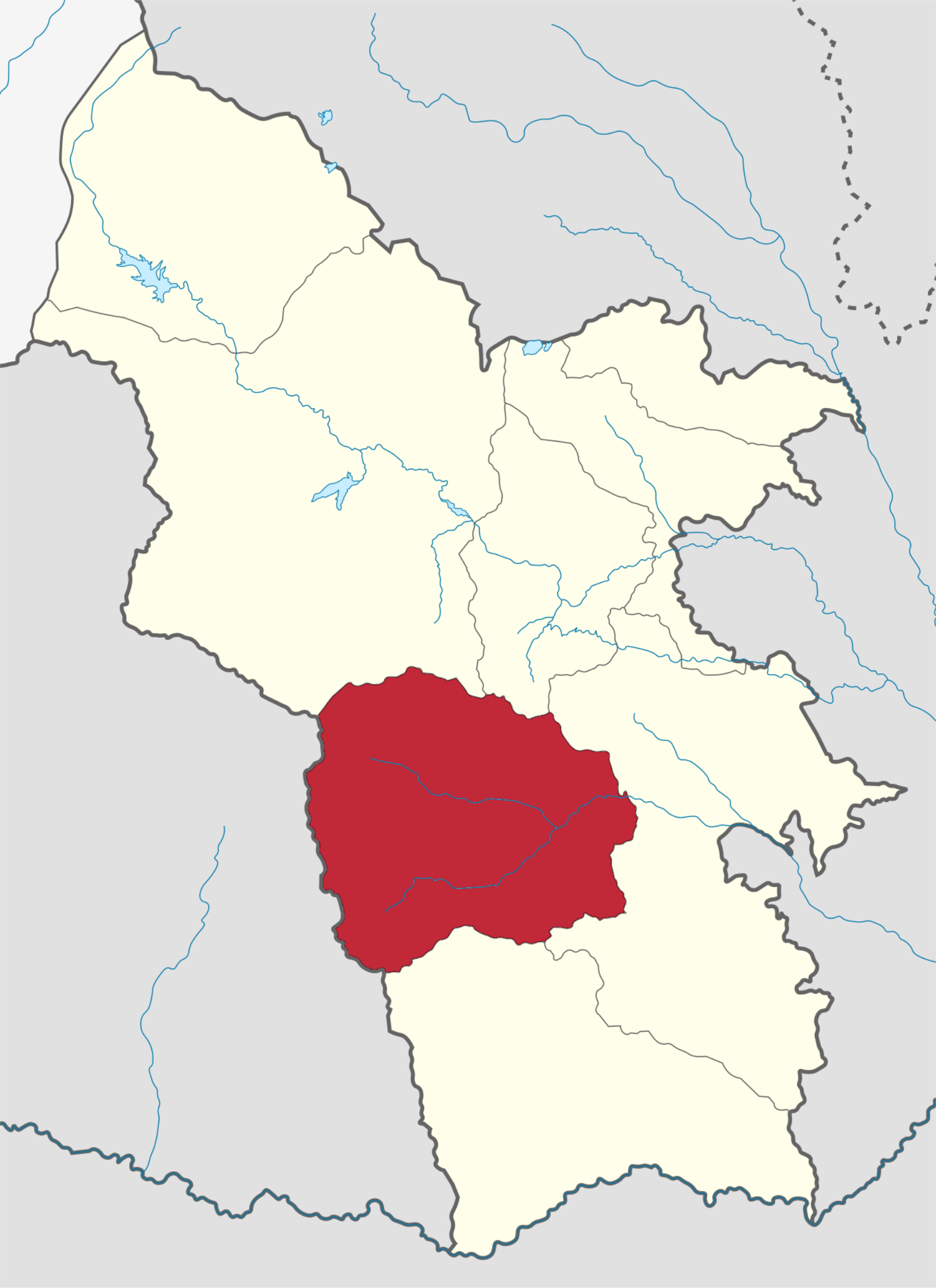
- Coordinates: 39°09′N 46°11′E
- Country: Armenia
- Province: Syunik
- Formed: 9 June 2017
- Administrative centre: Kajaran

Government
  - Mayor: Manvel Paramazyan

Population (2011 census)
  - Total: 9,134
- Time zone: AMT (UTC+04)
- Postal code: 3201–3519
- ISO 3166 code: AM-SU
- FIPS 10-4: AM08

Kajaran Municipality, referred to as Kajaran Community (Armenian: Քաջարան Համայնք Kajaran Hamaynk), is an urban community and administrative subdivision of Syunik Province of Armenia, at the south of the country. Composed of a group of settlements, its administrative centre is the town of Kajaran.

== Included settlements ==
| Settlement | Type | Population (2011 census) |
|---|---|---|
| Kajaran | Town, administrative centre | 7,163 |
| Ajabaj | Village | 28 |
| Andokavan | Village | 118 |
| Babikavan | Village | 216 |
| Dzagikavan | Village | 57 |
| Geghi | Village | 172 |
| Getishen | Village | 87 |
| Kajarants | Village | 250 |
| Katnarat | Village | 16 |
| Kavchut | Village | 88 |
| Lernadzor | Village | 866 |
| Nor Astghaberd | Village | 57 |
| Pkhrut | Village | 16 |
| Geghavank | Abandoned village | 0 |
| Kard | Abandoned village | 0 |
| Karut | Abandoned village | 0 |
| Kitsk | Abandoned village | 0 |
| Nerkin Giratagh | Abandoned village | 0 |
| Verin Giratagh | Abandoned village | 0 |
| Verin Geghavank | Abandoned village | 0 |
| Vocheti | Abandoned village | 0 |

== Politics ==
Kajaran Municipal Assembly (Armenian: Քաջարանի համայնքապետարան, Kajarani hamaynqapetaran) is the representative body in Kajaran Municipality, consisting of 15 members which are elected every five years. The last election was held in September 2022. Manvel Paramazyan of To Unity Alliance was elected mayor.

| Party | 2022 | Current Municipal Assembly |
|---|---|---|
| **To Unity Alliance** | **10** | |
| Civil Contract | **4** | |
| Hanrapetutyun Party | **1** | |
| Total | 15 | |

Ruling coalition or party marked in bold.

To Unity Alliance is an alliance between Democratic Alternative Party and Fair Armenia Party.

== See also ==
- Syunik Province
