= Nerkin Giratagh =

Nerkin Giratagh Ներքին Գիրաթաղ
- Location within Armenia Location within Syunik Province
- Coordinates: 39°13′10″N 46°16′22″E
- Country: Armenia
- Province: Syunik
- Municipality: Kajaran

Population (2011)
  - Total: 0
- Time zone: UTC+4 (AMT)

Nerkin Giratagh (Armenian: Ներքին Գիրաթաղ) is an abandoned village in the Kajaran Municipality of Syunik Province of Armenia.

== Municipal administration ==
Nerkin Giratagh was formerly part of the rural community of Verin Giratagh, which was merged into the community of Lernadzor.

== Demographics ==
The Statistical Committee of Armenia reported that Nerqin Giratagh was uninhabited at the 2001 and 2011 censuses.
