= Kavchut =

Kavchut Կավճուտ
- Location in Armenia Kavchut (Syunik Province)
- Coordinates: 39°12′31″N 46°14′27″E
- Country: Armenia
- Province: Syunik
- Municipality: Kajaran
- Elevation: 1,378 m (4,521 ft)

Population (2011)
  - Total: 156
- Time zone: UTC+4 (AMT)

Kavchut (Armenian: Կավճուտ) is a village in the Kajaran Municipality of the Syunik Province in Armenia. In 1988-1989 Armenian refugees from Azerbaijan settled in the village.

== Municipal administration ==
The village was a part of the community of Lernadzor until the June 2017 administrative and territorial reforms, when the village became part of the Kajaran Municipality.

== Demographics ==
The village's population was 156 at the 2011 census, down from 112 at the 2001 census.
