= Geghavank =

Geghavank Գեղավանք
- Location within Armenia Location within Syunik Province
- Coordinates: 39°13′01″N 46°11′25″E
- Country: Armenia
- Province: Syunik
- Municipality: Kajaran

Population (2011)
  - Total: 0
- Time zone: UTC+4 (AMT)

Geghavank (Armenian: Գեղավանք) is an abandoned village in the Kajaran Municipality of Syunik Province, Armenia. Geghavank is listed as unpopulated in the 2011 Armenian census.
