= Verin Geghavank =

Verin Geghavank Վերին Գեղավանք
- Location within Armenia Location within Syunik Province
- Coordinates: 39°13′24″N 46°11′07″E
- Country: Armenia
- Province: Syunik
- Municipality: Kajaran

Population (2011)
  - Total: 0
- Time zone: UTC+4 (AMT)

Verin Geghavank (Armenian: Վերին Գեղավանք) is an abandoned village in the Kajaran Municipality of the Syunik Province of Armenia.

== Demographics ==
The Statistical Committee of Armenia reported the village was uninhabited at the 2001 and 2011 censuses.
