= Ajabaj =

Ajabaj Աջաբաջ
- Location within Armenia Location within Syunik Province
- Coordinates: 39°15′N 46°05′E
- Country: Armenia
- Province: Syunik
- Municipality: Kajaran

Population (2011)
  - Total: 28
- Time zone: UTC+4 (AMT)

Ajabaj (Armenian: Աջաբաջ) is a village in the Kajaran Municipality of the Syunik Province in Armenia.

== Toponymy ==
The village was previously known as Ajaran and Ajaraj.

== Demographics ==
The Statistical Committee of Armenia reported its population was 30 at the 2001 census.
