= Kard, Armenia =

Kard Կարդ
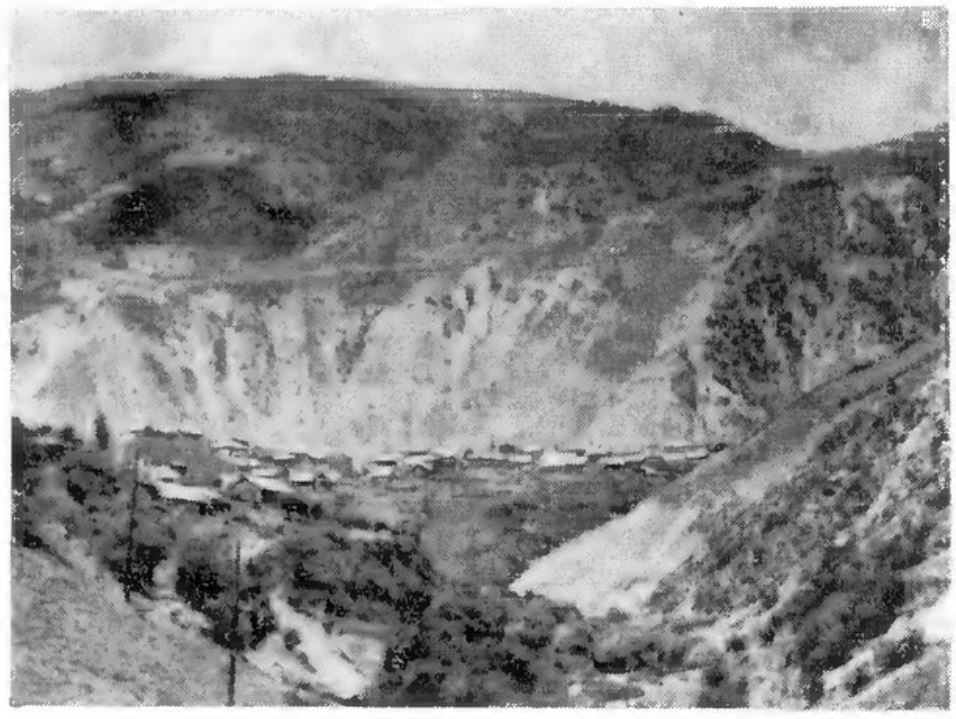
- Kard village (ca 1970-80s)

- Location within Armenia Location within Syunik Province
- Coordinates: 39°12′56″N 46°06′20″E
- Country: Armenia
- Province: Syunik
- Municipality: Kajaran

Population (2011)
  - Total: 0
- Time zone: UTC+4

Kard (Armenian: Կարդ) is an abandoned village in the Kajaran Municipality of Syunik Province, Armenia. The Statistical Committee of Armenia reported it was uninhabited at the 2001 and 2011 censuses.
