= Karut =

Karut Քարուտ
- Location within Armenia Location within Syunik Province
- Coordinates: 39°16′15″N 46°07′08″E
- Country: Armenia
- Province: Syunik
- Municipality: Kajaran

Population (2011)
  - Total: 0
- Time zone: UTC+4

Karut (Armenian: Քարուտ); is an abandoned village in the Kajaran Municipality of Syunik Province of Armenia.

== Demographics ==
600 people lived in the village in 1987. Statistical Committee of Armenia reported it as unpopulated at the 2011 census, down from 8 at the 2001 census.
