= Verin Giratagh =

Verin Giratagh Վերին Գիրաթաղ
- Location within Armenia Location within Syunik Province
- Coordinates: 39°14′25″N 46°16′00″E
- Country: Armenia
- Province: Syunik
- Municipality: Kajaran

Population (2011)
  - Total: 0
- Time zone: UTC+4 (AMT)

Verin Giratagh (Armenian: Վերին Գիրաթաղ) is an abandoned village in the Kajaran Municipality of Syunik Province of Armenia.

== Demographics ==
The Statistical Committee of Armenia reported that both the village of Verin Giratagh and the former community were uninhabited at the 2001 and 2011 censuses.
