= Lernadzor =

Lernadzor Լեռնաձոր
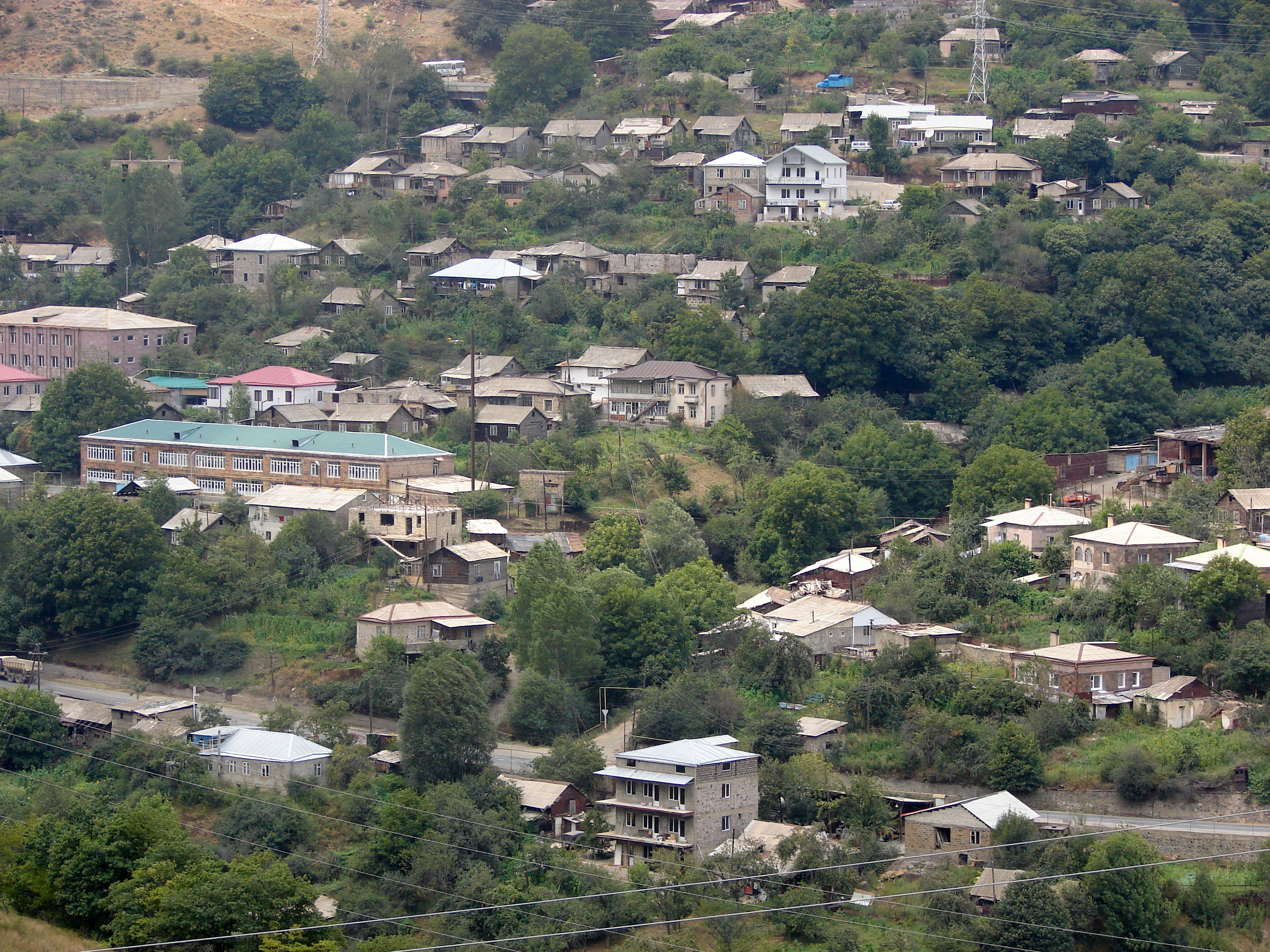

- Location within Armenia Location within Syunik Province
- Coordinates: 39°09′26″N 46°11′59″E
- Country: Armenia
- Province: Syunik
- Municipality: Kajaran

Area
  - Total: 102.78 km^{2} (39.68 sq mi)

Population (2011)
  - Total: 866
  - Density: 8.43/km^{2} (21.8/sq mi)
- Time zone: UTC+4 (AMT)

Lernadzor (Armenian: Լեռնաձոր) is a village in the Kajaran Municipality of the Syunik Province in Armenia.

== Toponymy ==
The village was previously known as Kyurdikend.

== Demographics ==
The village's population was 866 at the 2011 census, up from 416 at the 2001 census.

== Municipal administration ==
Lernadzor was previously a community which included the villages of Lernadzor, Kavchut, Musallam, Nerkin Giratagh and Verin Giratagh, until the June 2017 administrative and territorial reforms, when the village became a part of the Kajaran Municipality. The Statistical Committee of Armenia reported the community of Lernadzor's population as 1,011 in 2011, up from 547 in 2010, which was down from 634 at the 2001 census.

== Uranium mine ==
In the 1970s, a Russian exploration team uncovered a mine containing in Lernadzor about 30,000 tons of uranium. In February 2008, a memorandum was signed between the ROA Ministry of Nature Protection and Rosatom, the Russian State Nuclear Energy Corporation, regarding the cooperative geological exploration, production and reprocessing in the Armenian uranium sector.

== Gallery ==
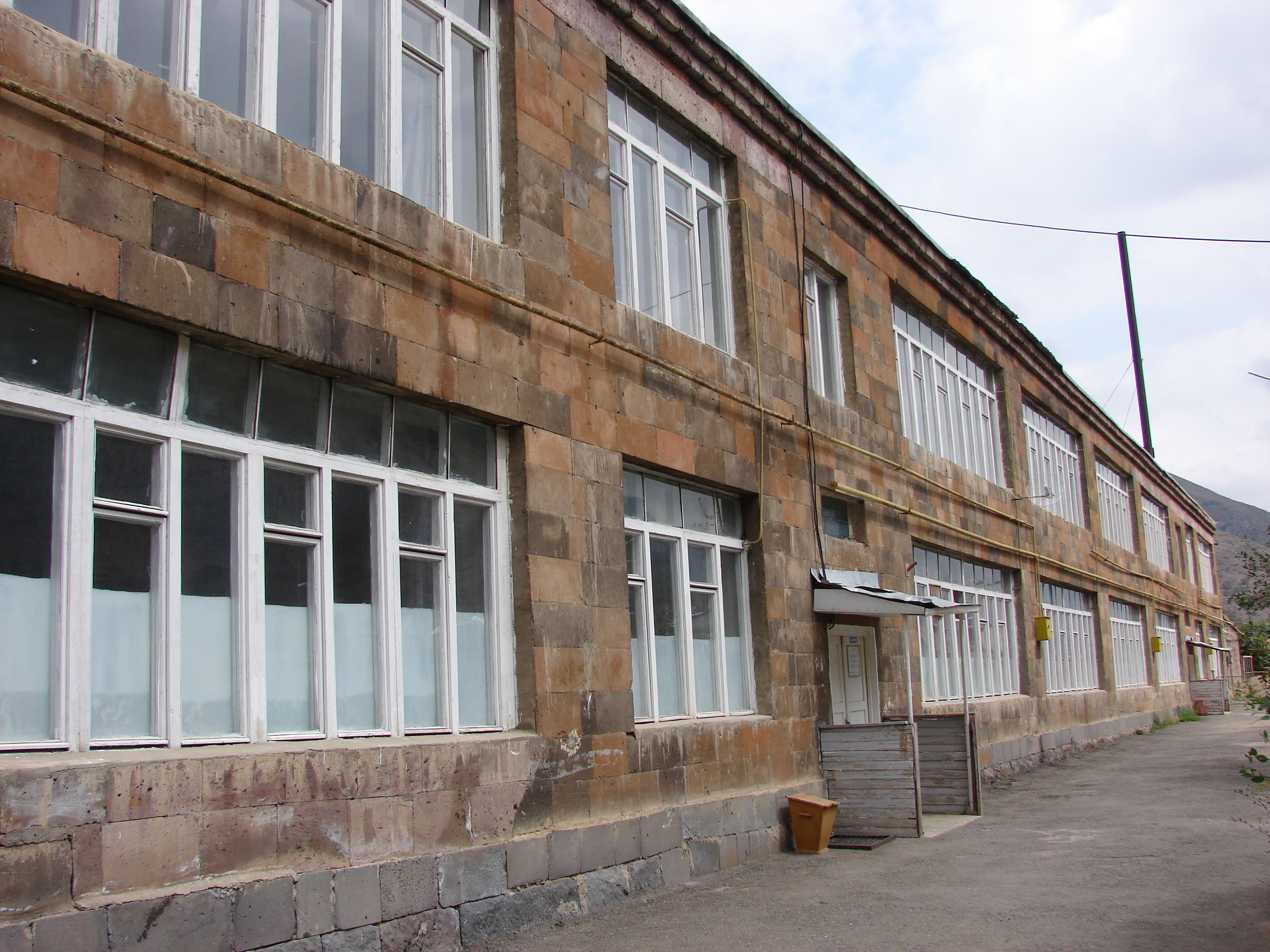
Village school

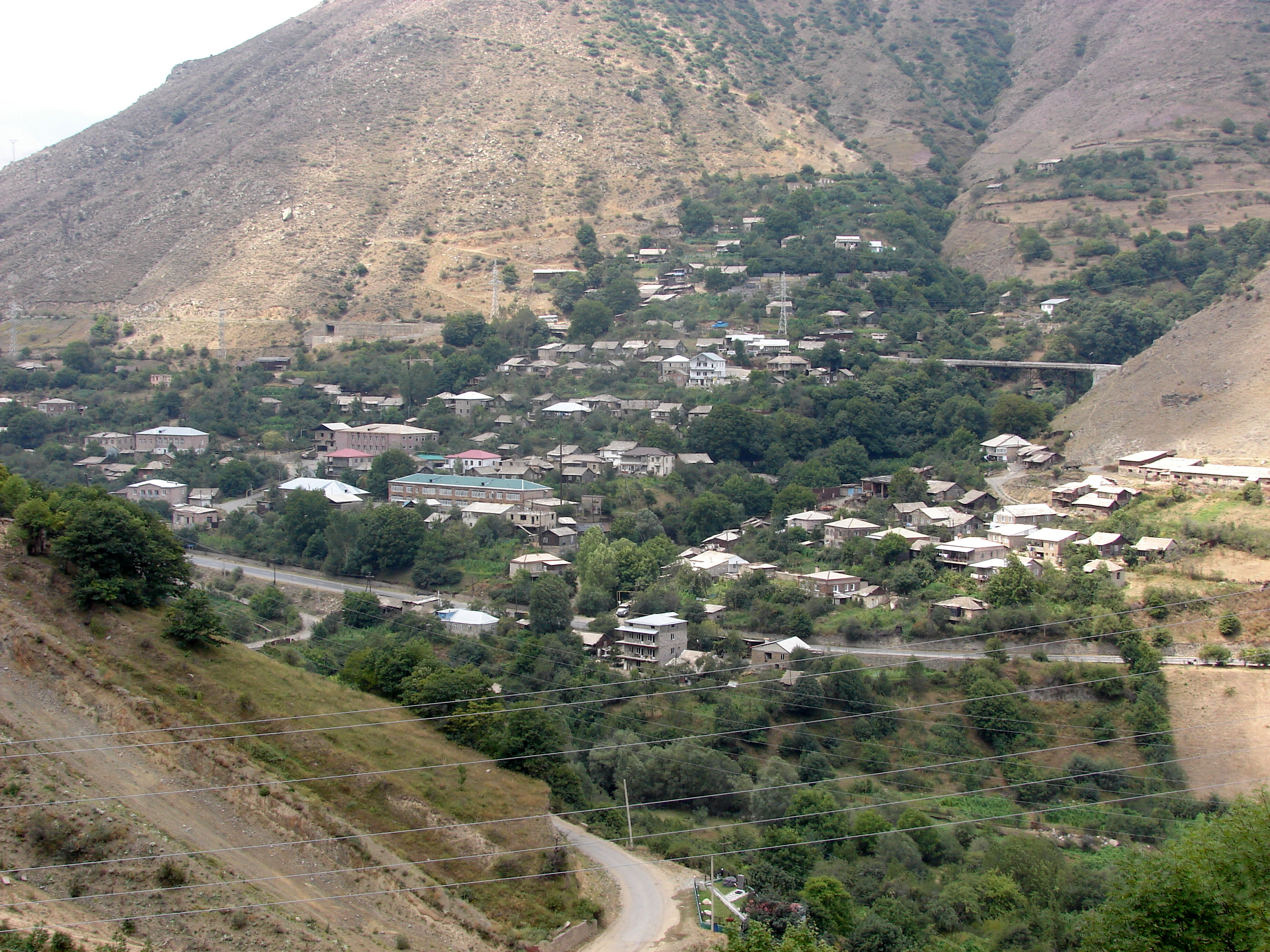
A view of the village
