= Lusagyugh =

Lusagyugh or Lusagyukh or Lusaghyugh may refer to:

- Lusagyugh, Aragatsotn, Armenia
- Lusagyugh, Armavir, Armenia
