= Karanlug =

Karanlug may refer to:

- Geghhovit, Armenia
- Lusagyugh, Aragatsotn, Armenia
- Martuni, Armenia
- Khojavend (city), Azerbaijan
