= Turkmenlu =

Turkmenlu may refer to:

- Apaga, Armenia - formerly Verin Turkmenlu
- Lusagyugh, Armavir, Armenia - formerly Nerkin Turkmenlu
