= Gharanlugh =

Gharanlugh may refer to:

- Nerkin Gharanlugh or Martuni, a city in the Gegharkunik Province (marz) of Armenia
- Verin Gharanlugh or Geghhovit, a town in the Gegharkunik Province of Armenia
