= Lusagyugh, Aragatsotn =

Lusagyugh Լուսագյուղ
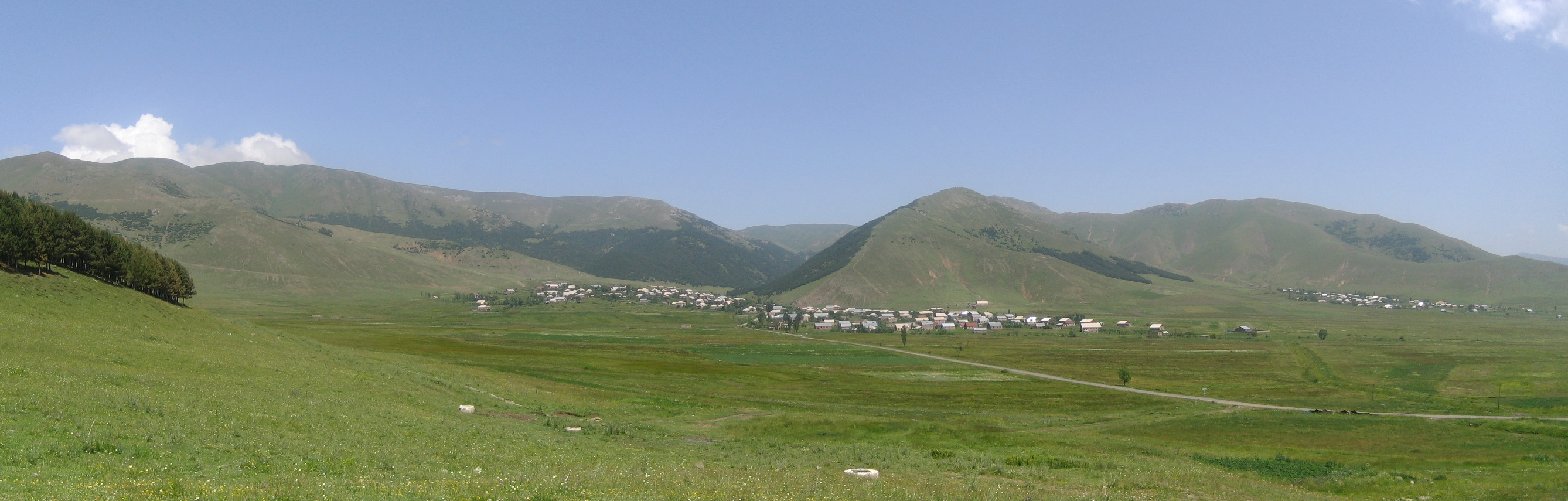
- Panorama of Lusagyugh

- Location within Armenia Location within Aragatsotn
- Coordinates: 40°36′31.50″N 44°22′55.89″E
- Country: Armenia
- Province: Aragatsotn
- Municipality: Aparan
- Elevation: 1,950 m (6,400 ft)

Population (2011)
  - Total: 710
- Time zone: UTC+4
  - Summer (DST): UTC+5

Lusagyugh (Armenian: Լուսագյուղ) is a village in the Aparan Municipality of the Aragatsotn Province of Armenia, located 1 km northeast of the town of Aparan.

The village is home to a church dating back to 1887 as well as the ruins of a 4th-century church.

Lusagyugh

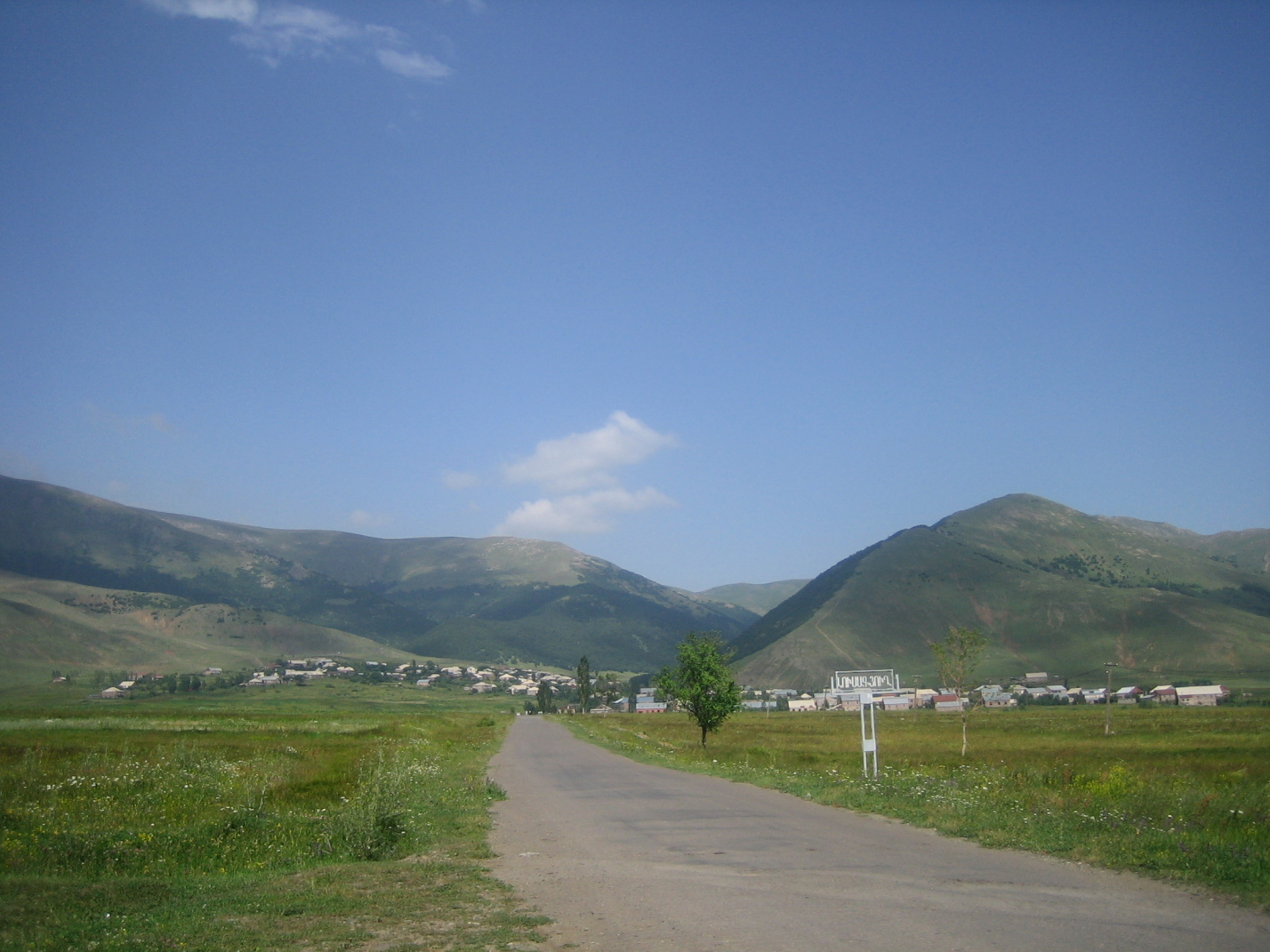
Entrance to the village at the road from Aparan

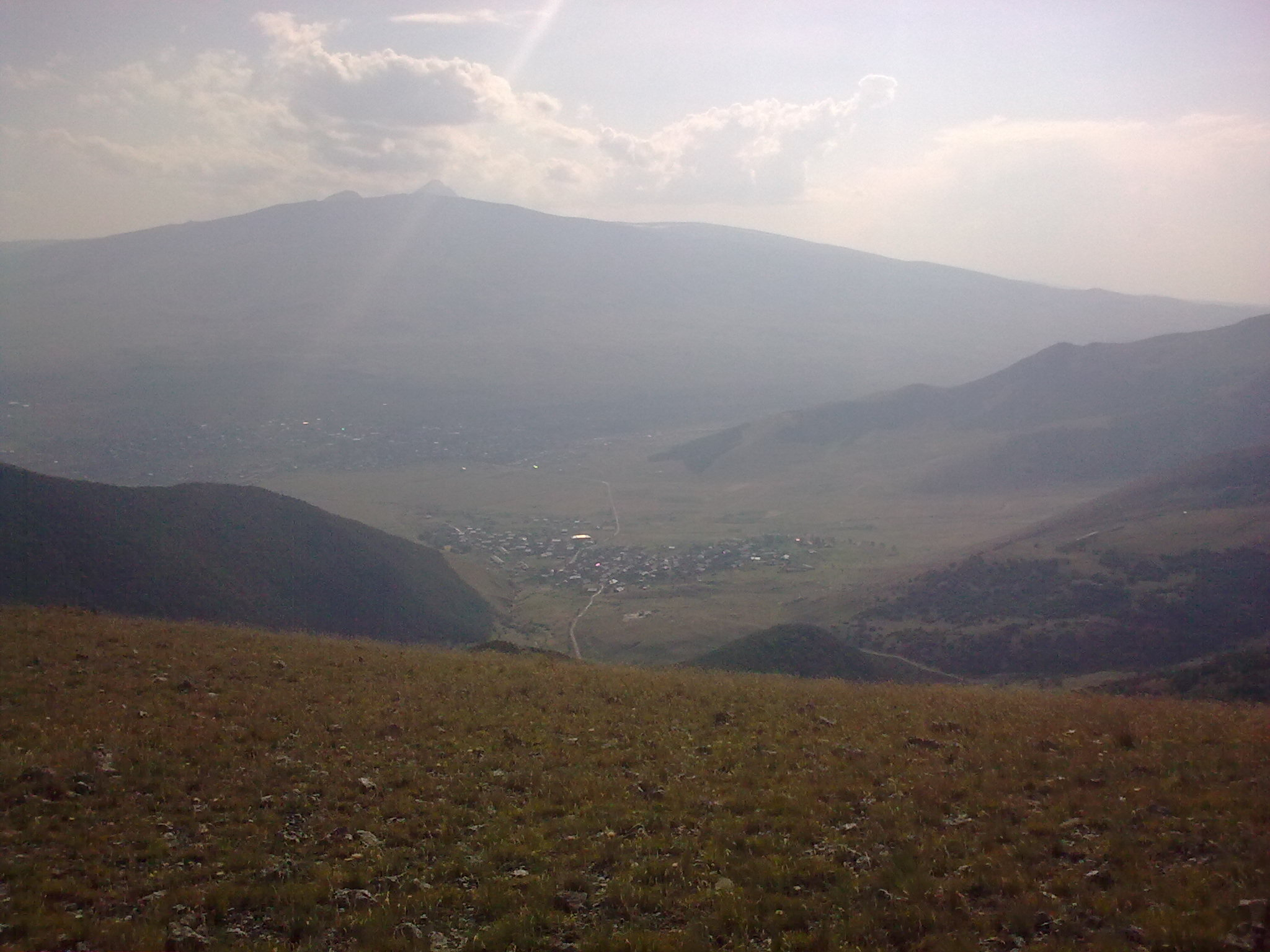
Lusagyugh and Aparan

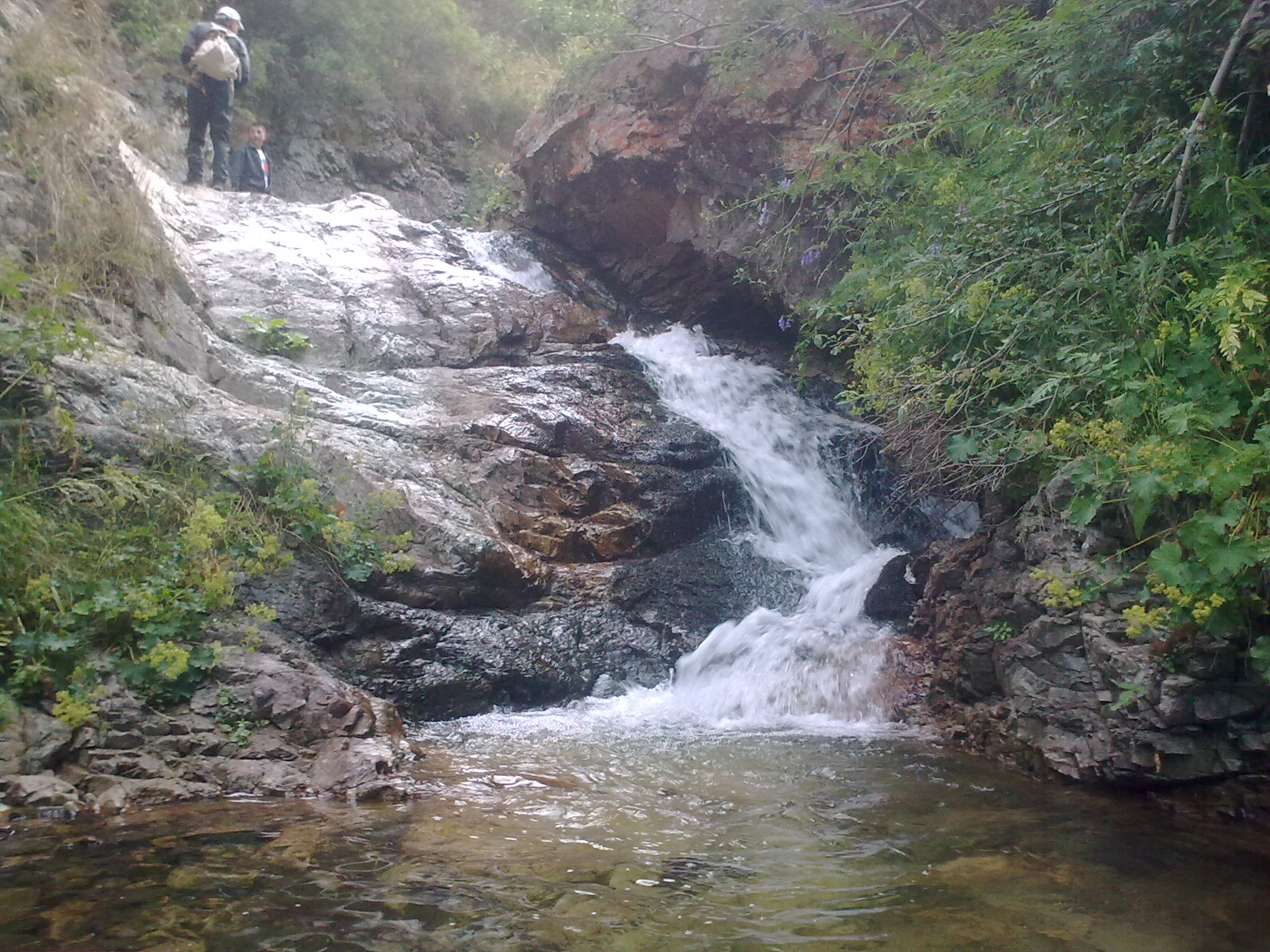
Natural sight 4 km from the village

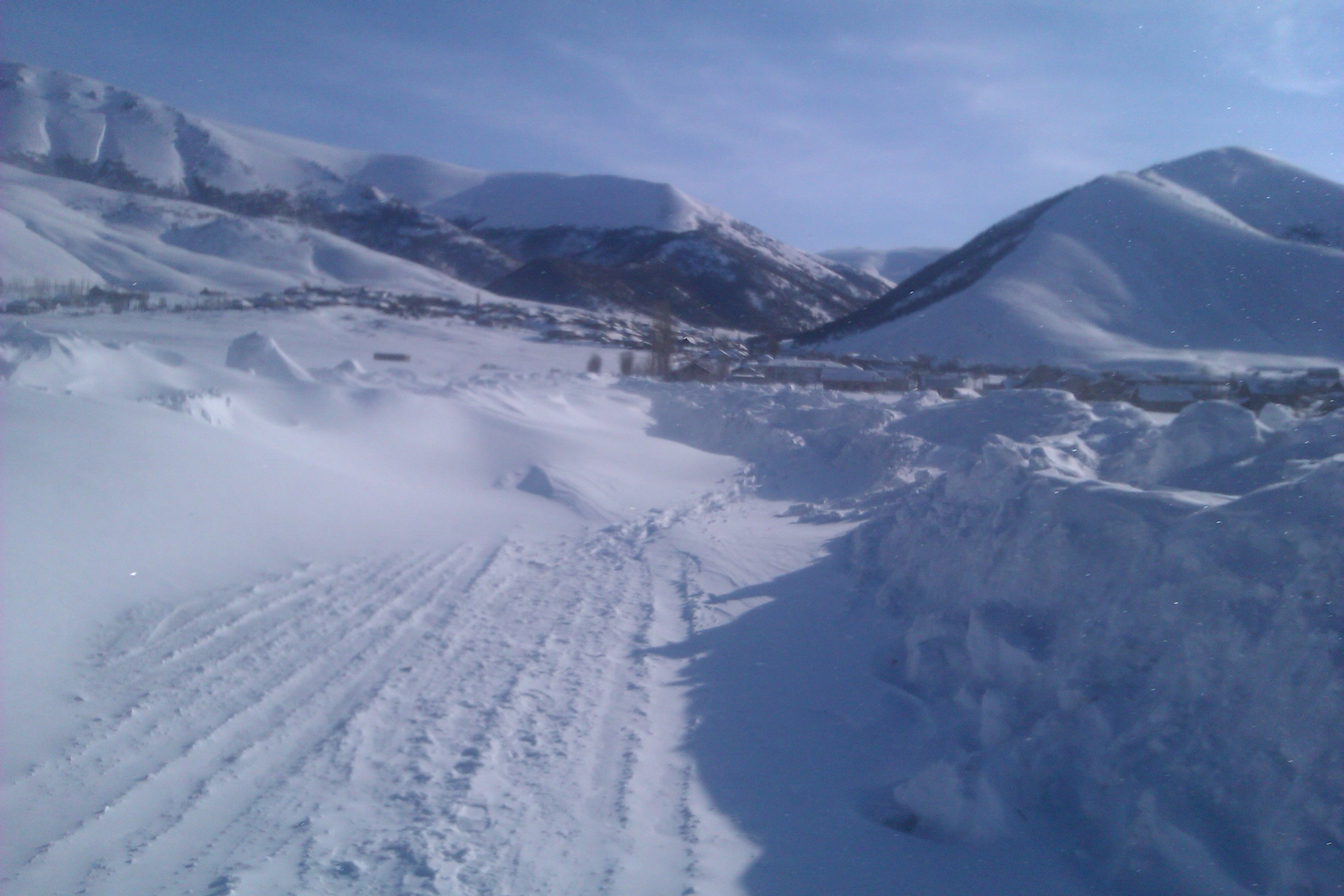
Winter in Lusagyugh, Aparan

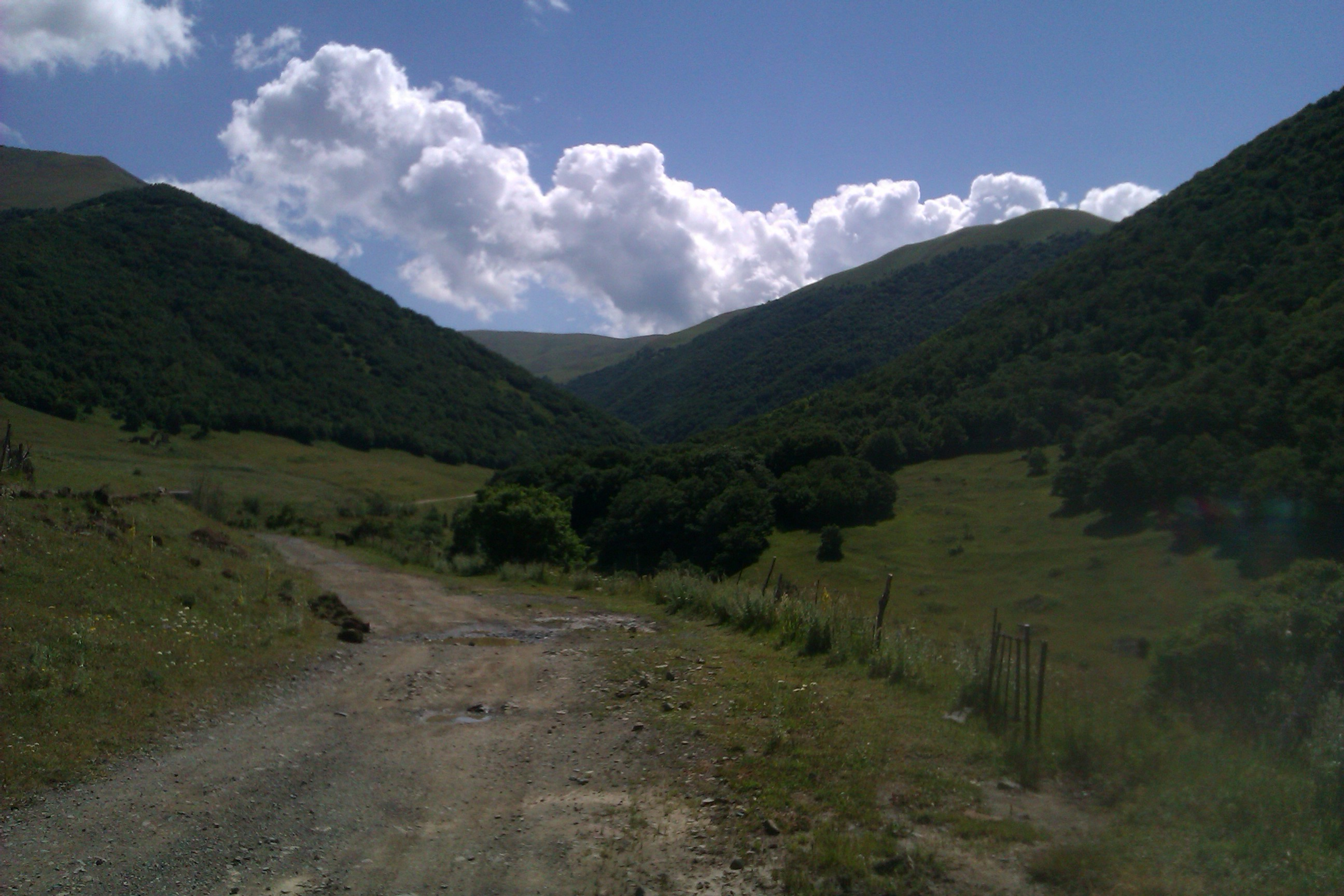
Lusagyugh forest

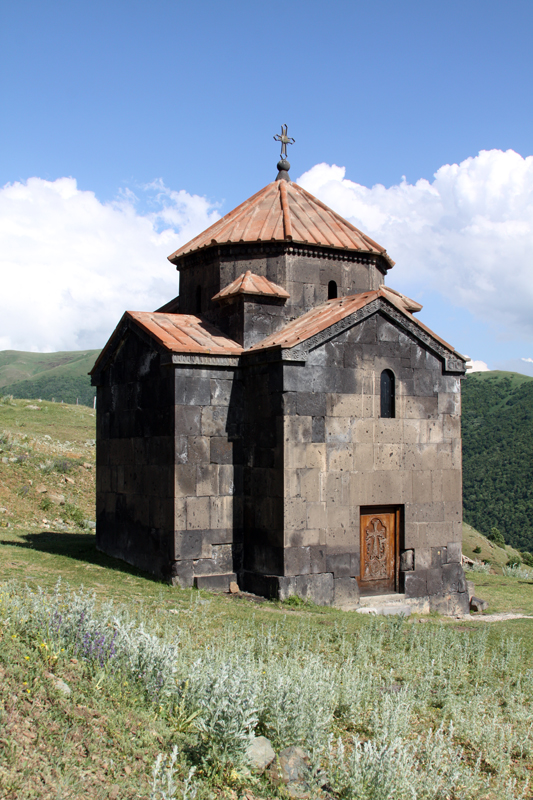
Tukh Manuk chapel, 7th century
