= Geghhovit =

Village in Gegharkunik, Armenia

Geghhovit Գեղհովիտ
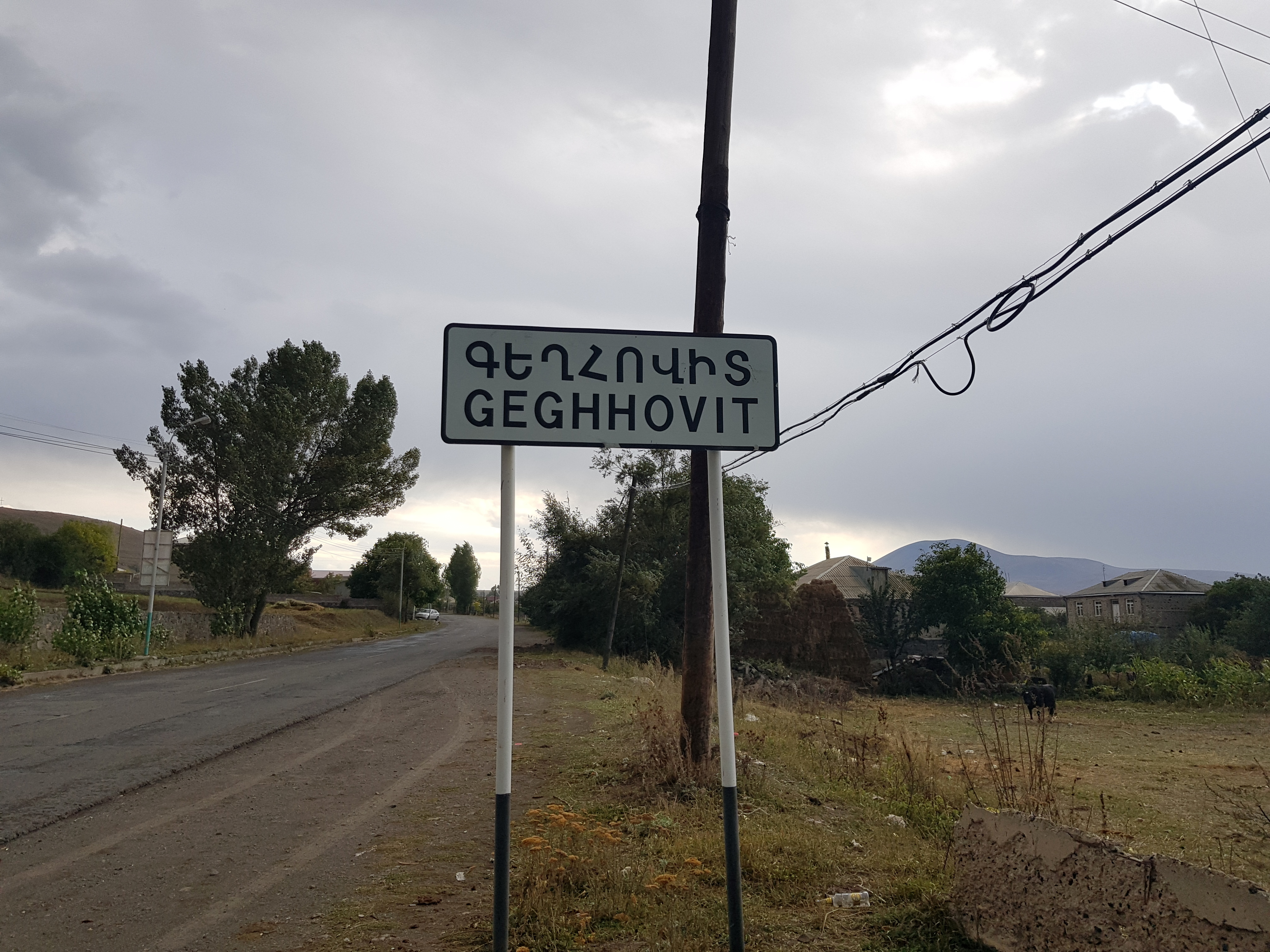
- Sign reading "Geghhovit" in Armenian

- Location within Armenia Location within Gegharkunik
- Coordinates: 40°06′02″N 45°17′03″E
- Country: Armenia
- Province: Gegharkunik
- Municipality: Martuni
- Elevation: 2,080 m (6,820 ft)

Population (2011)
  - Total: 5,753
- Time zone: UTC+4 (AMT)
- Postal code: 1405
- Geghhovit at GEOnet Names Server (under its prior name)

Geghhovit (Armenian: Գեղհովիտ) is a village in the Martuni Municipality of the Gegharkunik Province of Armenia.

== Etymology ==
The village is also known as Geghahovit, and was known as Verin Gharanlugh until 1968.

== History ==
The village was founded in the 15th century. The village contains the roofless St. Gevorg Church, built in 1873. The church has some older khachkars built into its walls and is surrounded by a medieval cemetery. There is also a modern small gray basalt Tukh Manuk chapel in the southern half of the village. Both buildings are located just off the main highway through the village.

== Gallery ==
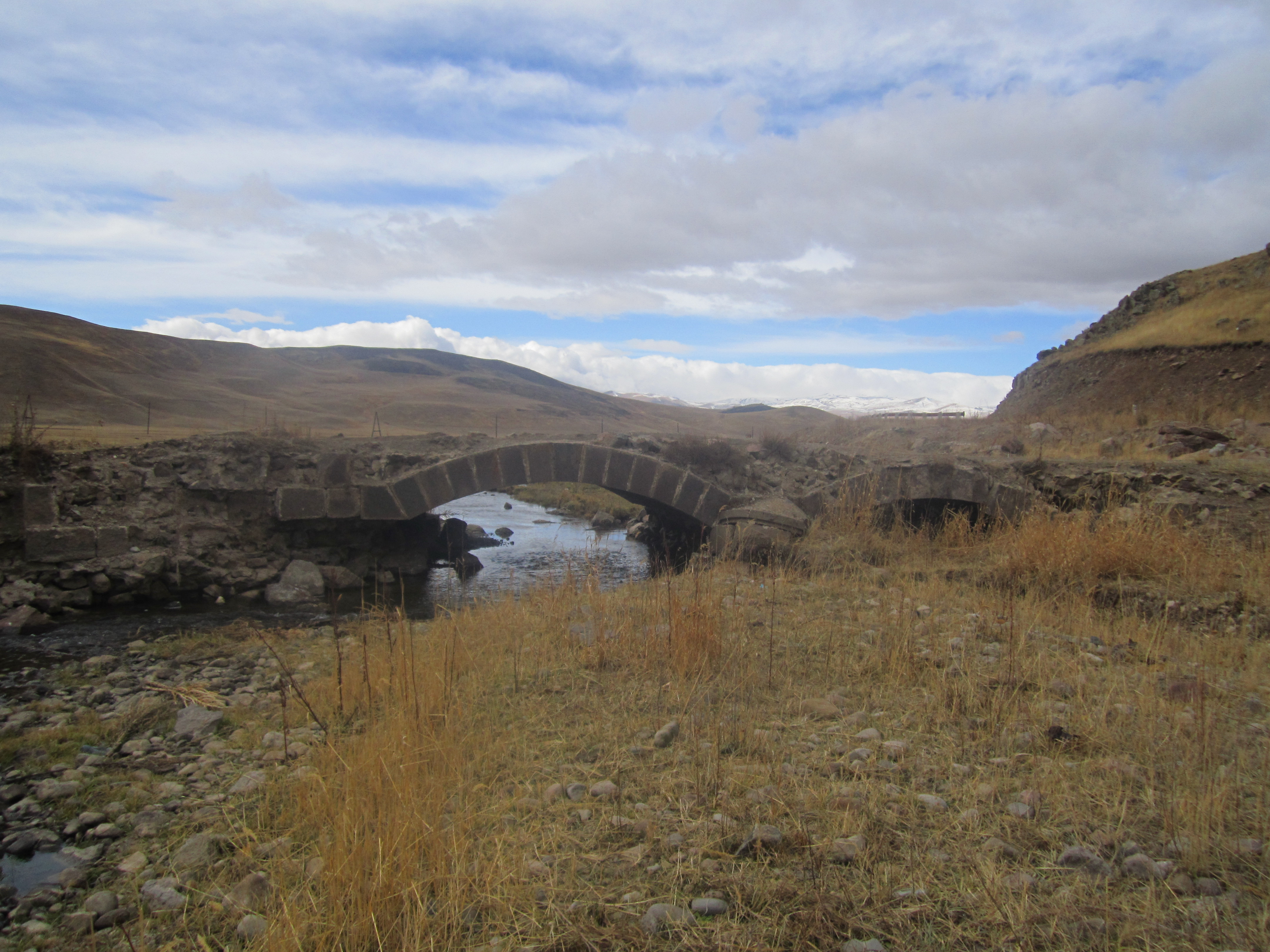
Bridge in Geghhovit

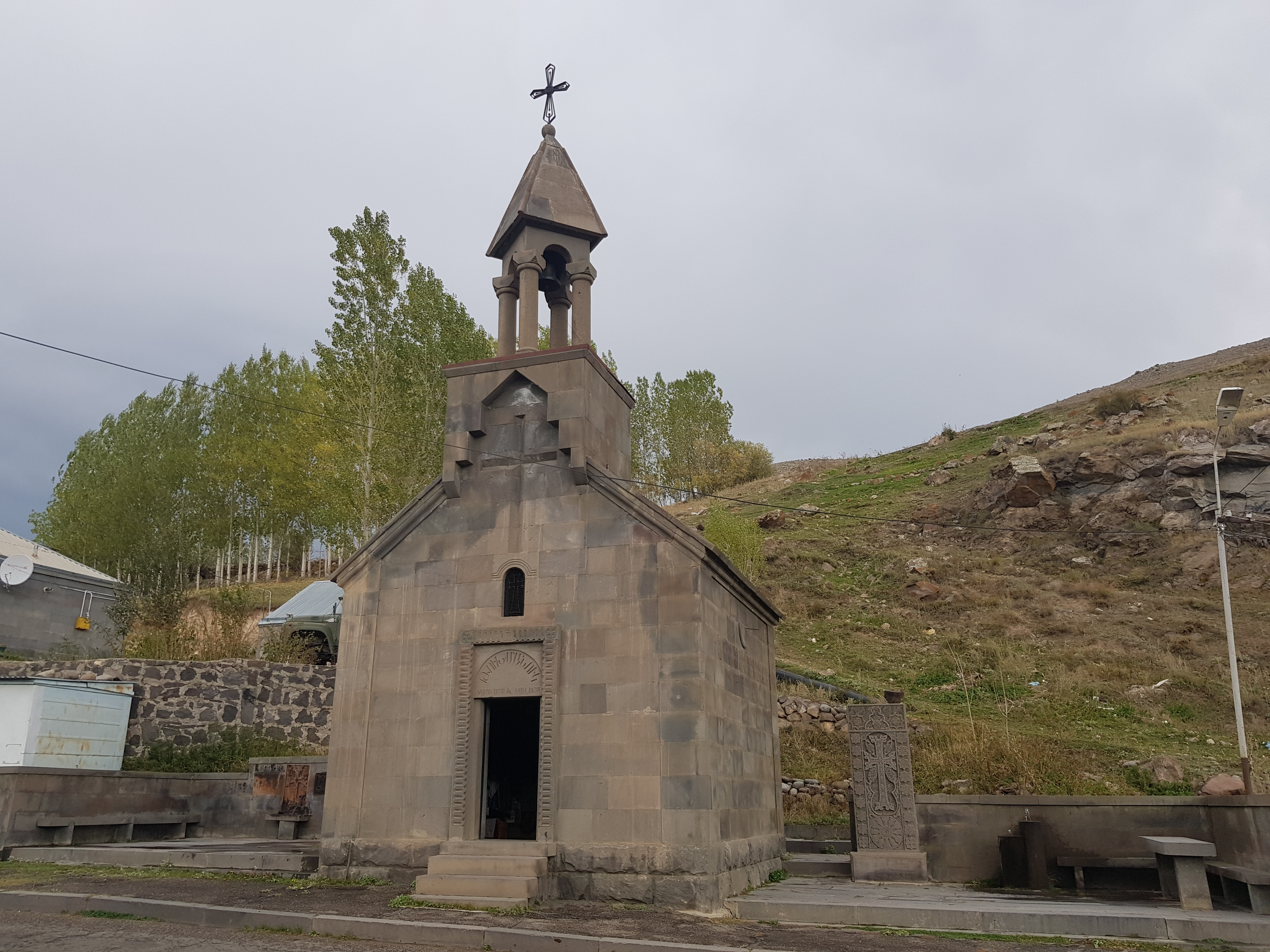
Chapel

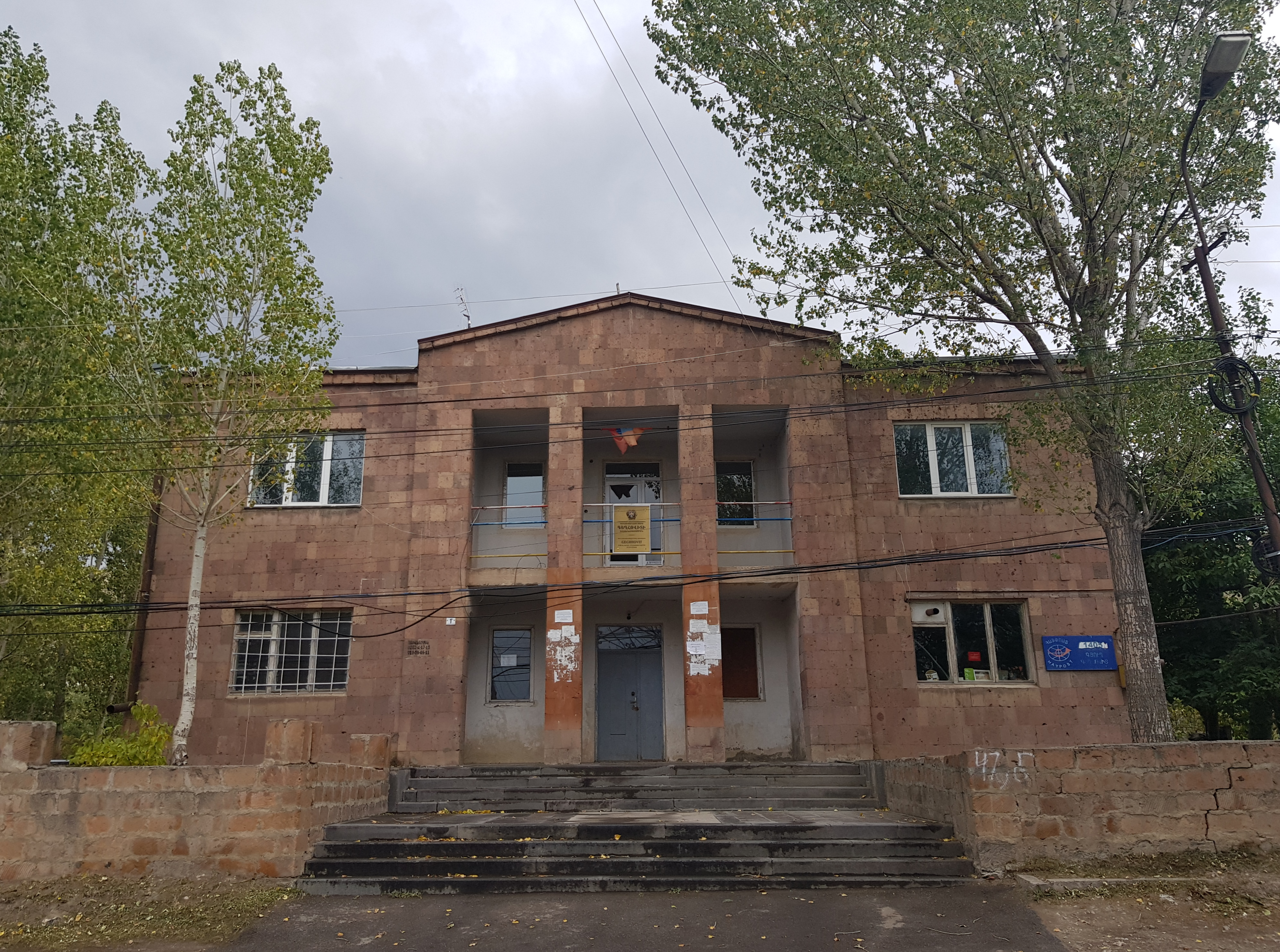
Municipality building

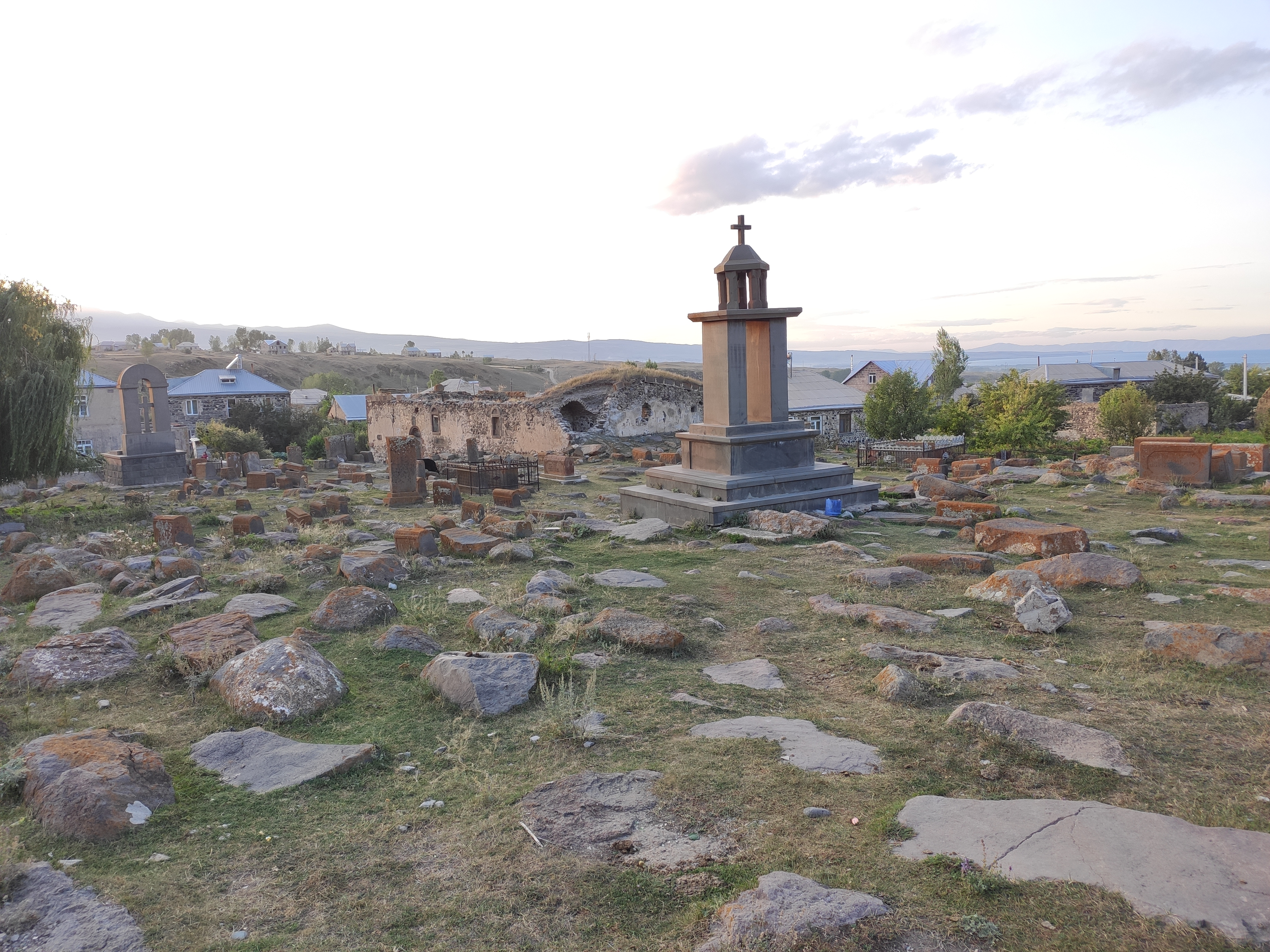
View of the town and St. Gevorg Church cemetery

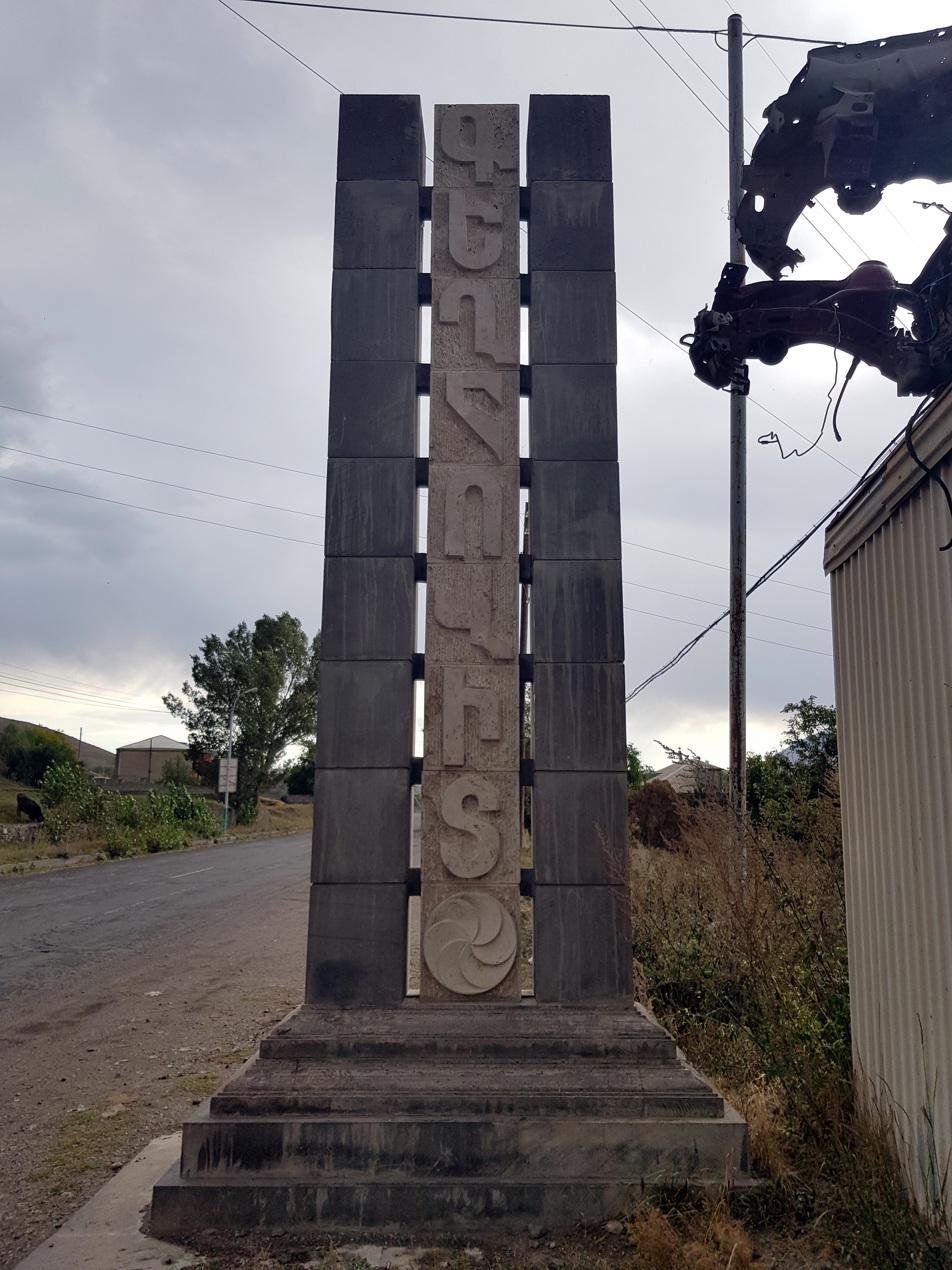
Village entrance monument

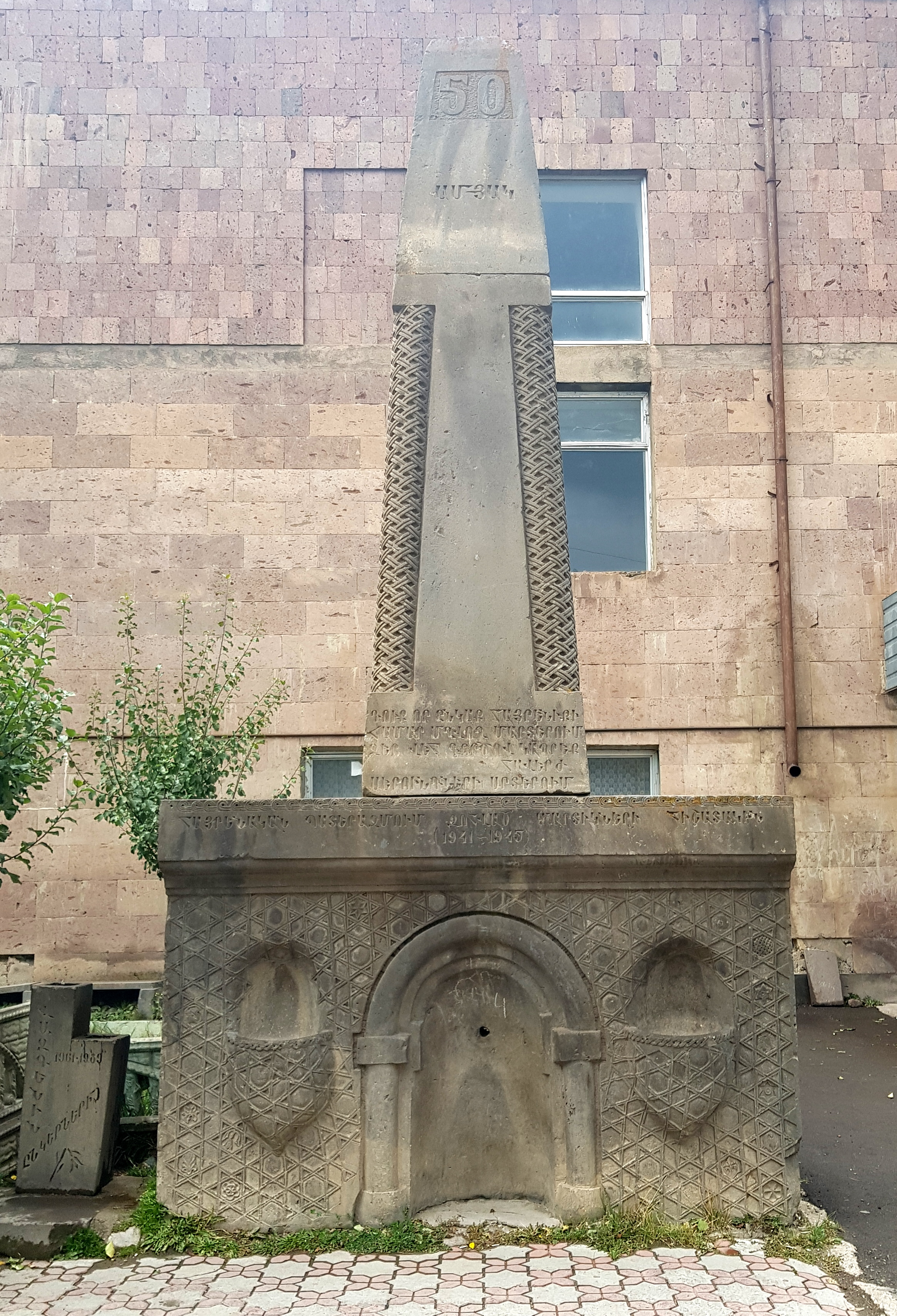
WWII monument

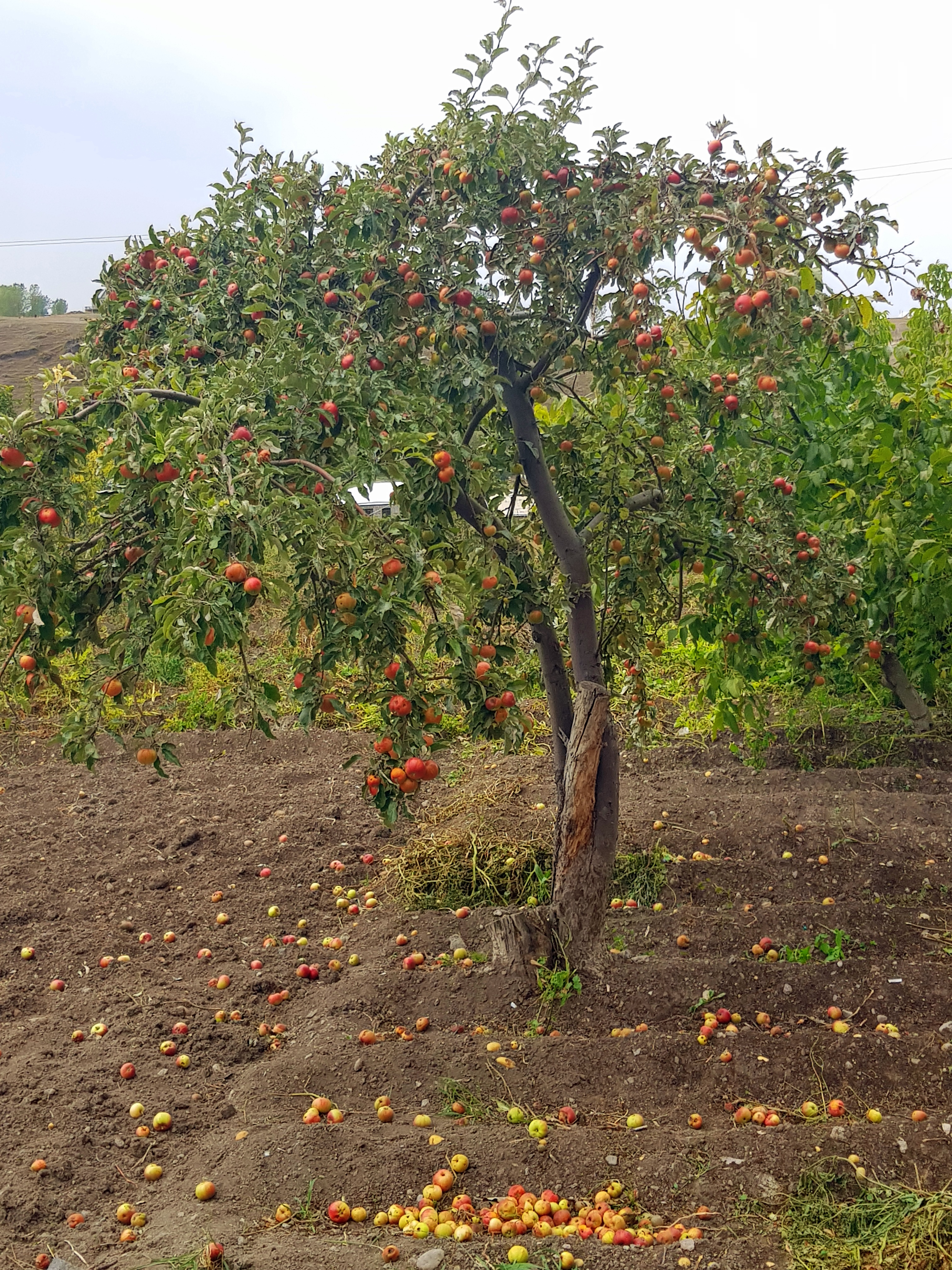
Apple tree in Geghhovit

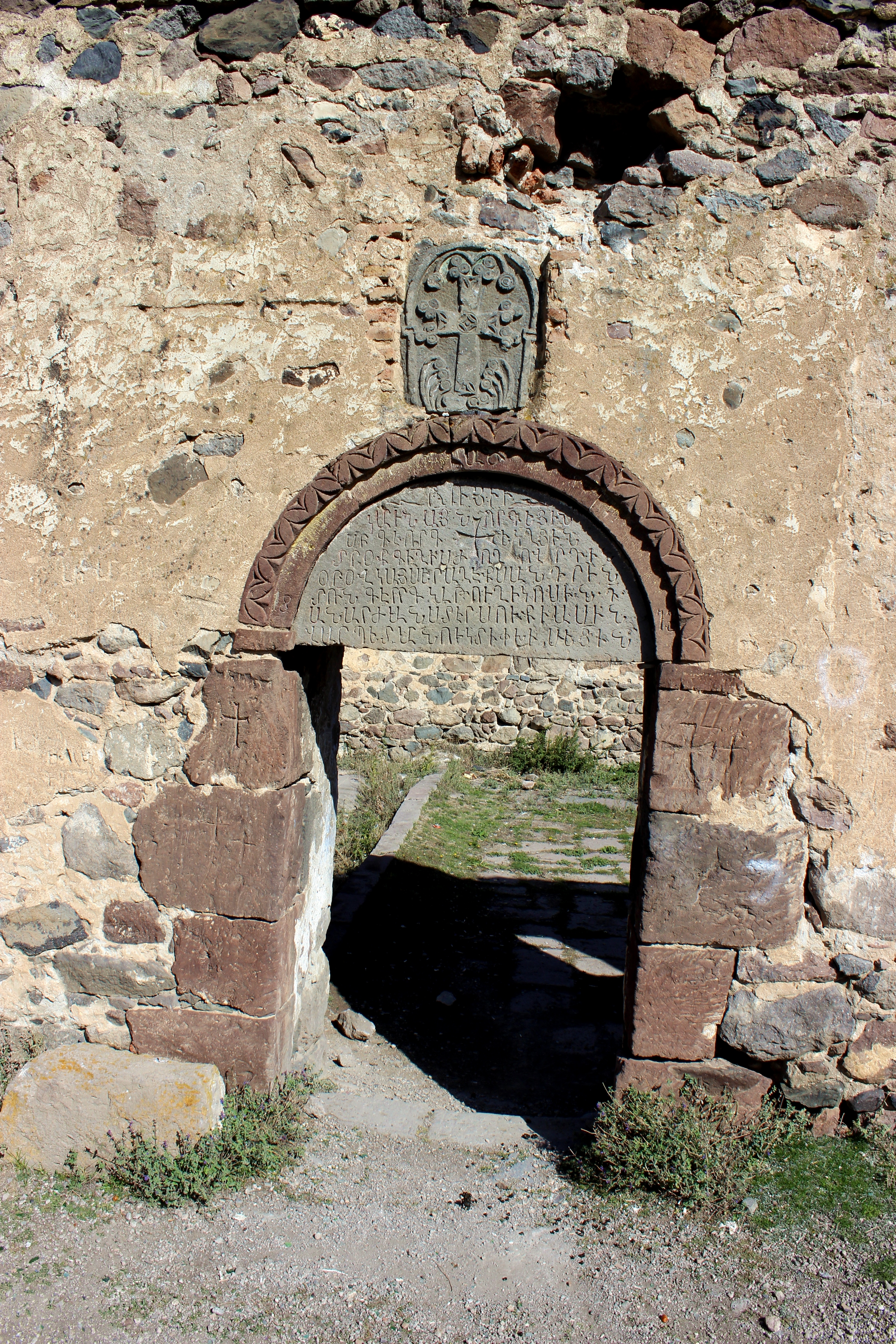
Door to St. Gevorg Church of Geghhovit. The words "St. Gevorg Church" can be read in Armenian to the left and right of the cross on the tympanum.

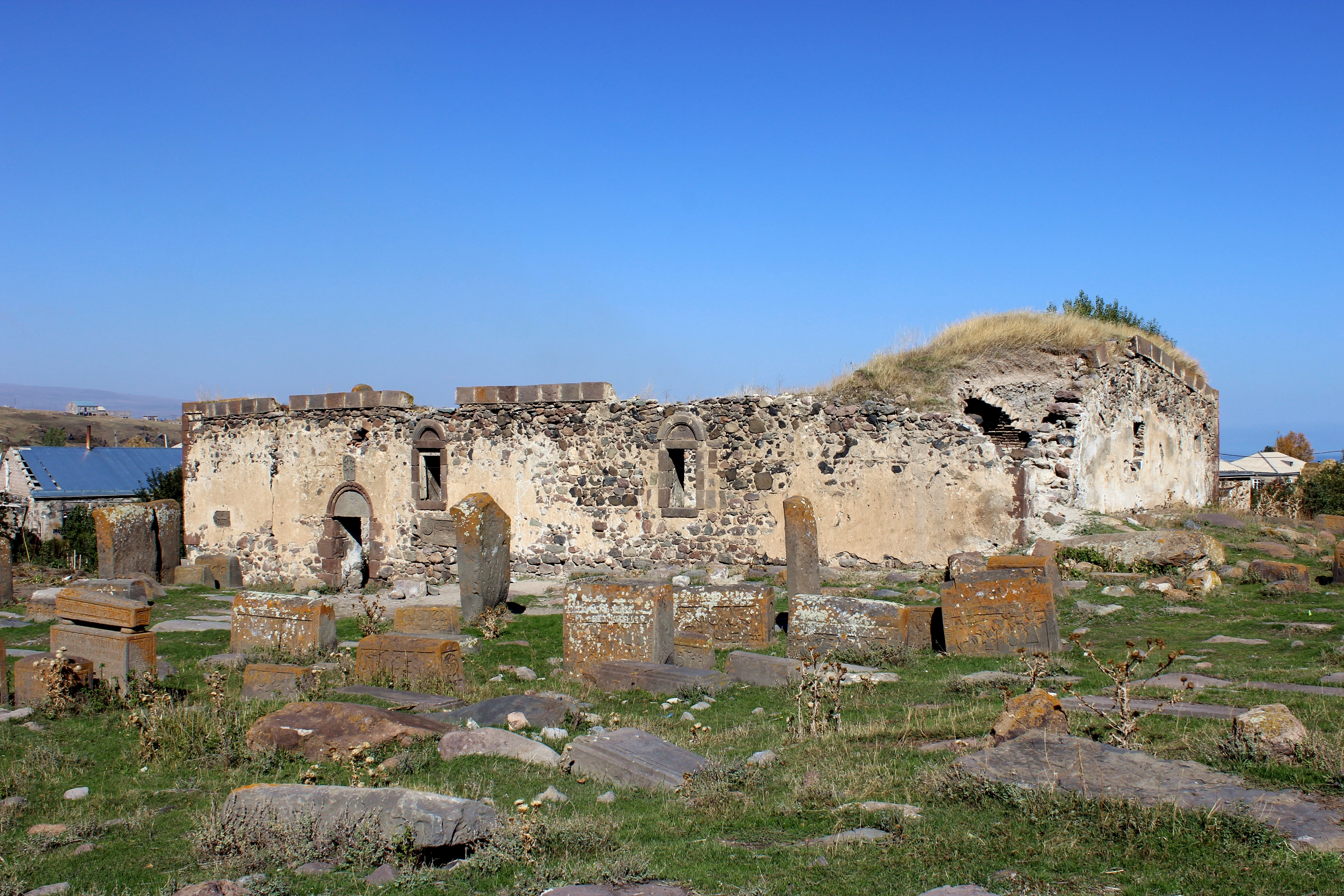
St. Gevorg Church of Geghhovit (1873) and surrounding medieval cemetery.
