= Lusagyugh, Armavir =

Village in Armavir, Armenia

Lusagyugh Լուսագյուղ
- Location within Armenia
- Coordinates: 40°05′20″N 44°16′12″E
- Country: Armenia
- Marz (Province): Armavir

Population (2011)
  - Total: 1,007
- Time zone: UTC+4 ( )
  - Summer (DST): UTC+5 ( )

Lusagyugh (Armenian: Լուսագյուղ, also Romanized as Lusagyukh, Lusagekh, and Lusaghyugh; until 1935, Nerk’in Turkmenlu and Turkmenlu) is a town in the Armavir Province of Armenia.

== See also ==
- Armavir Province
