= Bottled water in Armenia =

Armenia has a massive production of bottled mineral and spring water, with a large number of water bottling companies.

== Mineral water ==
Armenia has a large reserve of mineral water, mainly in the regions of Ararat Province (including Artashat and Vedi), Jermuk, Bjni, Arzni, Hankavan, and Dilijan.

Starting from 2004, production levels of bottled mineral water is dramatically growing.

The production volume reached up to 33 million liters during 2012. In 2013, the country witnessed a record in the production of bottled mineral water reaching up to 43.2 million liters, of which 11.8 million liters were exported. Consequently, the water bottling industry has succeeded in restoring and exceeding its pre-2009 crisis volumes, when a record volume of production was observed in 2008, reaching up to 35.8 million liters, of which 9.7 million was exported.

Currently, around 25-30% of mineral water produced in Armenia is being exported. The main importing country is Russia while the 2nd is the United States. Other major importing countries included Georgia, Kazakhstan, Belarus, Turkmenistan, Iran and the United Arab Emirates.

=== 2013 ===
In 2013, around 10.5 million liters of mineral water were exported to Russia. Despite the Jermuk water scandal in the US in 2007, the United States have imported around 300,000 liters of mineral water from Armenia in 2013, making it the second-largest importer after Russia. Ukraine are 3rd with 250,000 liters in the same year.

In 2013, Armenia has also started to export mineral water to the United Arab Emirates. The volume was around 105,000 liters in that initial year. Other importing countries include: Georgia (171,000 liters in 2013), Poland (42,000 liters in 2013), and France (16,000 liters in 2013).

=== 2014 ===
In 2014, the production volume reached up to 58.6 million liters, an increase of 35.6% compared to 2013. The exported volume was 14.7 million liters (25% of the produced mineral water). Around 13 million liters in 2014 was exported to Russia (88.5% of total mineral water exports). 460,000 liters was exported to the United States.

=== 2016 ===
Since 2016, one of Armenian mineral water bottling producers began actively gain the American market, in particular, moving to a completely new level of the non-ethnic market and started to sale its product in the largest retail chains, competing with the world-famous brands of Europe. Start-up begun with an export of around million bottles per year and within forthgoing next years multiplied by 15-30% per year.

== Water bottling by region ==
Many water bottling companies are operating in Armenia since the Soviet days. Generally, 2 types of water are being produced: mineral and spring.

=== Aragatsotn Province ===
- Aparan Aqua (Aparan Group), founded in 2005 in Aparan. The bottled water is mainly from the region of Mount Aragats in Aragatsotn. Brands include:
  - Aparan Aqua (spring).
- Hayler Water (Hayasy Group), founded in 2011 in Voskevaz. The bottled water is mainly from the region of Mount Aragats in Aragatsotn. Brands include:
  - Hayler Still (spring).
  - Hayler Sparkling (mineral, carbonated).

=== Ararat Province ===
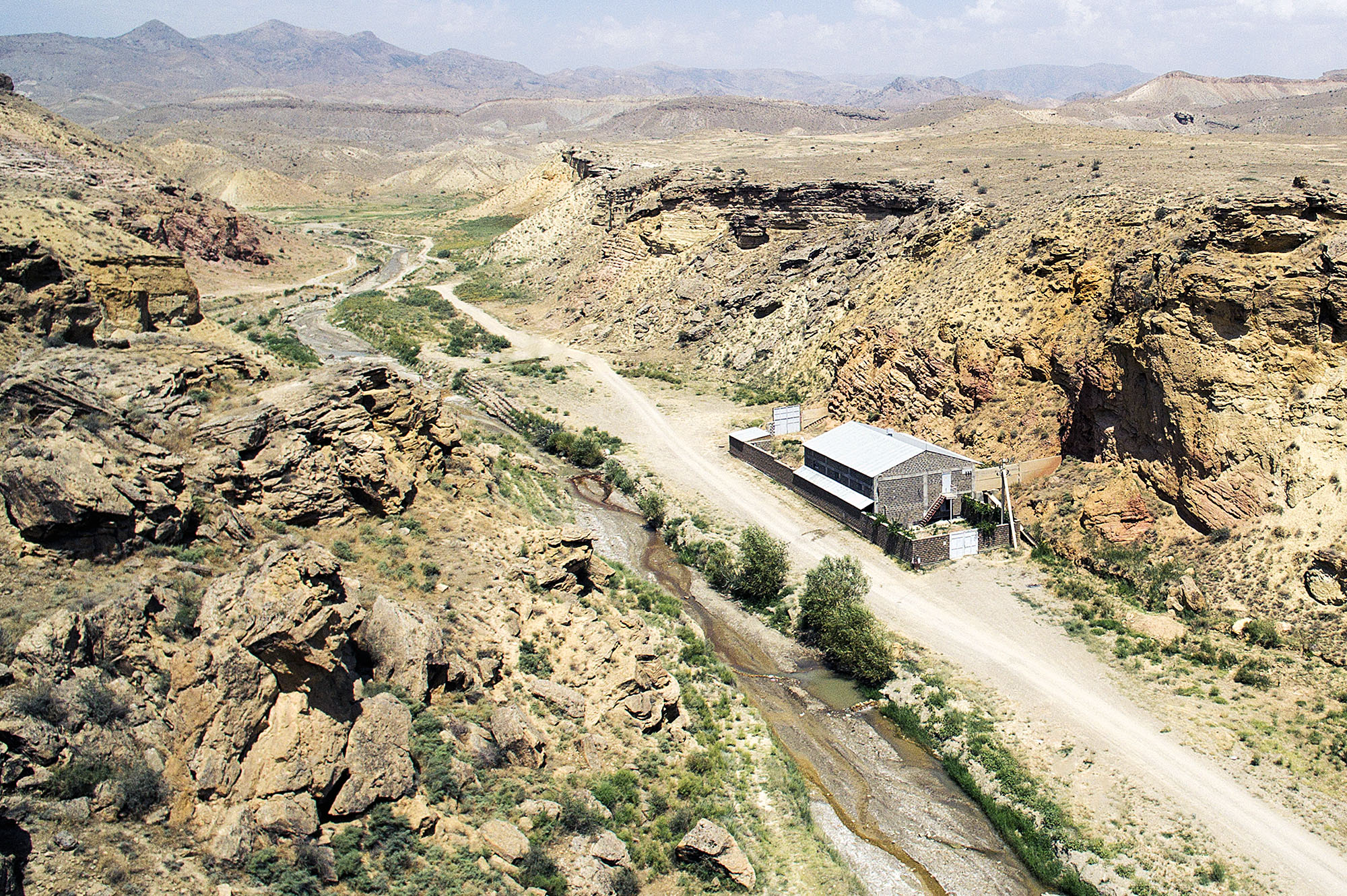
Well B2 No.11, Borot-Aghbyur gorge

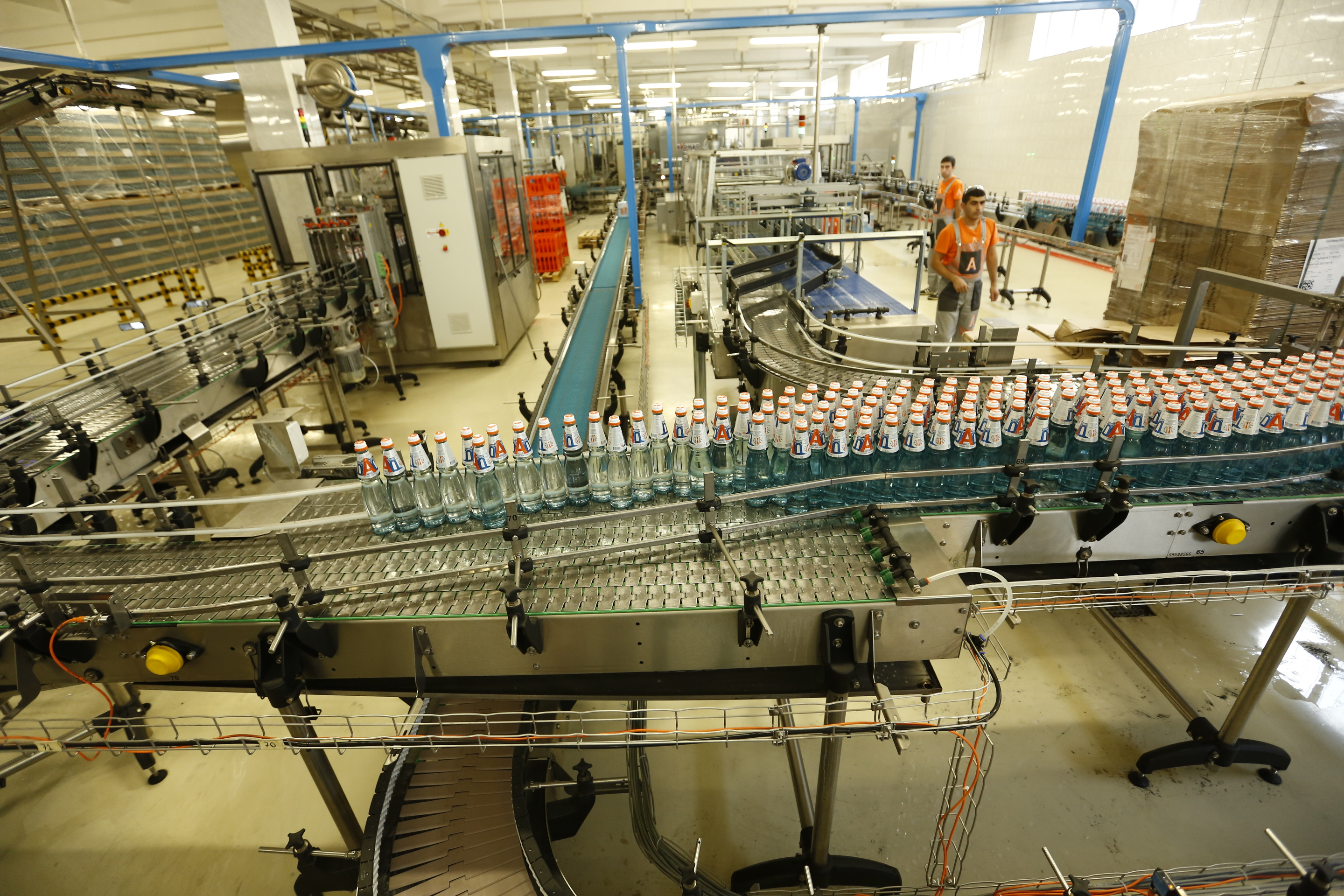
Ararat Plant

- Ararat Group, founded in 2009 in Artashat. The bottled carbonic-dioxide water Wells В2 No.11, No.12, No.19 of Vedi, Ararat region are located in the Borot-Aghbyur gorge of the Urts mountain range on the territory of the Khosrov reserve at an altitude of 1,500 meters (4,900 feet) above sea level. The depth of the wells is 130–151 meters (427–495 ft). The well is in service since 1964. ARARAT natural mineral water belongs to the group of hydrocarbonate waters obtained from natural sources. Brands include:
  - Ararat (mineral, carbonated, high in minerals sparkling water, TDS:2478 mg/L, pH:6.6).
  - The Well Still (mineral, none carbonated, low in minerals still water, TDS:191 mg/L, pH:7.1).
  - The Well Sparkling (mineral, carbonated, low in minerals sparkling water, TDS:475 mg/L, pH:5.8).
  - Baby Well (mineral, none carbonated purified water for babies, TDS:113 mg/L, pH:7.1)..
  - Well Go (mineral, none carbonated, low in minerals still water, TDS:191 mg/L, pH:7.1).

Product is bottled in 300ml, 500ml and 600ml Glass bottles, 500ml, 680ml, 1000ml and 1500ml PET bottles as well as in bag-in-box packages.

=== Gegharkunik Province ===
- Sevan Mineral Water Plant, founded in 1953 in Gavar. The plant was closed in 1992 and reopened in 2015. The bottled mineral water is mainly from the mountains around Lake Sevan, differing from many others in Armenia since it is almost free of arsenic. Brands include:
  - Sevan (mineral).

=== Kotayk Province ===
- Bjni and Noy (RRR Mineral Waters Plant), Charentsavan, founded in 1977 and re-founded in 2010. The bottled water is mainly from the region of Bjni. Brands include:
  - Bjni Classic (mineral, carbonated).
  - Bjni Elitar (mineral, mildly carbonated).
  - Bjni Luxe (mineral, carbonated).
  - Noy (spring).
  - Noy Kids (spring).
  - Noy Sport (spring).
  - Noy Luxe (spring).
- Garni Crystalline (Rocarm LLC), founded in 1999 in Jrvezh. The bottled water is mainly from the region of Garni, Kotayk, characterized with crystal clarity. Brands include:
  - Garni Crystalline (mineral, carbonated).
  - Garni Crystalline (spring).
- Clear Water (Multi Aquamarine LLC), founded in 2003 in Akunk. The bottled water is mainly from the springs of Katnaghbyur, Lori: Brands include:
  - Clear Water (spring).
  - Aqua Rina (spring).
- Sipan Water (Sam-Har LLC), founded in 2003 in Abovyan. The bottled water is mainly from the region of Jemruk in Vayots Dzor. Brands include:
  - Sipan Sparkling (mineral, carbonated).
  - Sipan (spring).
- Aquastone (Vadabek LLC), founded in 2012 in Bjni. The bottled water is mainly from the Vardabet spring of Bjni. in Kotayk. Brands include:
  - Aquastone (spring).
- Evawater (Pacific Home LLC), founded in 2014 in Akunk. The bottled water is mainly from the springs of Mont Hatis in Kotayk. Brands include:
  - Evawater (spring).

=== Syunik Province ===
- Akner Water (Goris Group), founded in 2005 in Goris. The bottled water is from the springs of Akner region in Syunik. Brands include:
  - Akner (spring).
- Tatni Mineral Water Factory (Arsen and Nerses LLC), founded in 2010 in Shamb. The bottled water is from the mountains of Shenatagh region in Syunik. Brands include:
  - Tatni (mineral).
  - Tatni Sparkling (mineral, carbonated).

=== Tavush Province ===
- Dilijan Mineral Water Plant, founded in 1947 in Dilijan. The bottled water is mainly from the area of Dilijan. Brands include:
  - Dilijan (spring).
  - Dilijan (mineral).

=== Vayots Dzor Province ===
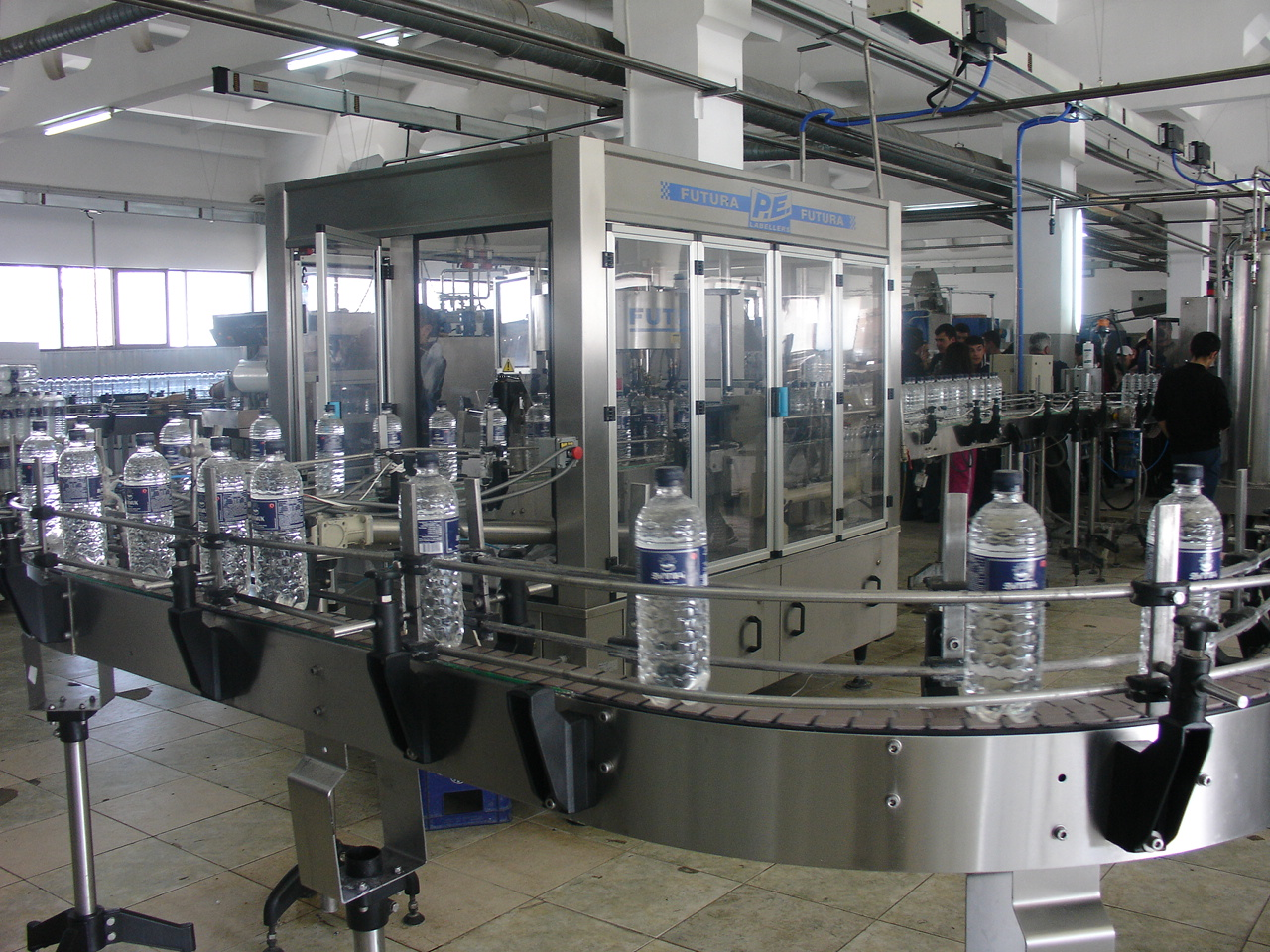
Jermuk Group

- Jermuk Group, founded in 1999 in Jermuk, is the largest Water bottling company in Armenia. The factory of Jermuk Mayr Gortsaran, founded in 1951, was acquired by Jermuk group in 2015–16. The bottled water produced by Jermuk Group is mainly from the region of Jermuk. Brands include:
  - Jermuk Classic (mineral, carbonated).
  - Jermuk Millennium (mineral, mildly carbonated).
  - Byuregh (spring).
  - Byuregh Sport (spring).
  - Byuregh Kids (spring).
- Jermuk Service Mineral Water Manufacturing Enterprise, founded in 2014 in Jermuk. The bottled water is mainly from the region of Jermuk. Brands include:
  - Jermuk Legend (mineral, carbonated).

=== Yerevan ===
- Arzni Group, founded in 1925 in Arzni and relocated to Yerevan in 2002. It is the oldest water bottling firm in Armenia. The bottled water is mainly from the region of Arzni. Brands include:
  - Arzni (mineral).
  - Arzni Crystal (mineral, carbonated).
  - Arzni (spring).
- Aparan Spring Water (Waterlok LLC), founded in 2000 in Yerevan. The bottled water is mainly from the springs of Aparan region. Brands include:
  - Aparan (spring).
  - Aparan Sport (spring).
- Aparan Lusaghbyur Water (Aparan-Tan+ LLC), founded in 2004 in Yerevan. The bottled water is mainly from the region of Lusaghbyur, Aragatsotn. Brands include:
  - Aparan Lusaghbyur (spring).
- Dilijan Frolova Mineral Water Factory, founded in 2007 in Yerevan. The bottled water is mainly from the region of Dilijan, Tavush. Brands include:
  - Dilijan Frolova Sparkling (mineral, carbonated).
  - Dilijan Frolova (spring).
- Byurakan Water (Elit Shant LLC), founded in 2007 in Yerevan. The bottled water is mainly from the region of Byurakan, Kotayk. Brands include:
  - Byurakan (mineral).
  - Byurakan (mineral, carbonated).
  - Byurakan (spring).
- JurJur Water (Everyday LLC), founded in 2008 in Yerevan. The bottled water is mainly from the springs of Jermuk, Vayots Dzor. Brands include:
  - JurJur (spring).
- Louzinian Water, produced by the Yerevan Kilikia Brewery since 2009. The bottled water is mainly from the region of Jermuk, Vayots Dzor. Brands include:
  - Louzinian (mineral).
- Sil Mineral Water Factory, founded in 2009 in Yerevan. The bottled water is mainly from the region of Garni, Kotayk. Brands include:
  - Sil Sparkling (mineral).
  - Sil Aqua (mineral).
  - Sil Super (mineral).
  - Sil Classic (spring).
- Alfa Aqua Enterprise, founded in 2009 in Yerevan. Brands include:
  - Alfa Aqua (mineral).
  - Alfa Aqua (spring).
- Splash Water Company, founded in 2014 in Yerevan. Brands include:
  - Splash (spring).
- Oasis Purified Water Plant (Sar-Nar LLC), founded in 2015 in Yerevan. Brands include:
  - Oasis (spring).
