= Lusaghbyur =

Lusaghbyur or Lusakhpyur may refer to:

- Lusaghbyur, Aragatsotn, Armenia
- Lusaghbyur, Lori, Armenia
- Lusaghbyur, Shirak, Armenia
