= Armenian Castle =

Armenian Castle Հայկական ամրոց
- Leader: Amram Petrosyan
- Founded: 23 October 2023; 3 years ago
- Headquarters: Yerevan, Armenia
- Ideology: Pro-BRICS; Youth politics
- National Assembly: 0 / 107

Website
- amroc.am

Armenian Castle (Armenian: Հայկական ամրոց, romanized: Haykakan amrots’), also known as Armenian Bastion or Armenian Fortress, is an Armenian political party that is headquartered in Yerevan.

== History ==
The Armenian Castle party was established on 27 October 2023 during a founding ceremony held in Jrvezh. Armenian-Ukrainian Amram Petrosyan is the founder and Chairman of the party. Petrosyan headed the Party of Pensioners of Ukraine between 2010 and 2012. Under his leadership, that political force achieved the highest success in its history, taking the 9th place in the 2012 Ukrainian parliamentary elections.

The party has no political representation within the National Assembly and currently acts as an extra-parliamentary force.

== Ideology ==
The party advocates for the economic development of Armenia, promoting social and humanitarian activities, and developing closer ties with the Armenian Diaspora and encouraging diaspora Armenian's to engage and collaborate in Armenia's socio-economic development. The party believes that the government should shape a foreign policy that promotes a balanced partnership between Armenia and all major global powers. Amram Petrosyan supports Armenia joining the BRICS organization and increasing economic integration with its member states. Petrosyan stated, "The intensification of Yerevan within the framework BRICS will be the first step to really strengthen Armenia's subjectivity as an international player, and in the future Armenia will have new allies around the world."

The party stated that it would be open to working with other political forces in Armenia to achieve their goals.

== See also ==
- Programs of political parties in Armenia
