= Svan =

Svan may refer to:

- Svan people, an ethnic group of the Georgian people
  - Svan language
  - Svaneti, a region of Georgia
- Lusaghbyur, Shirak, Armenia, a village formerly called Svan
- Anaco Airport, Venezuela (ICAO code: SVAN)
- Ferry Svan (born 1996), Swedish woodchopper (sport)
- Gunde Svan (born 1962), Swedish cross-country skier
- Marie Svan (born 1963), Swedish cross-country skier
- Lasse Svan Hansen (born 1983), Danish handball player

== See also ==
- Svans (disambiguation)
