= Svans (disambiguation) =

Svans may refer to:

- Svans, an ethnic subgroup of the Georgians
- The Danish name for the Schwansen peninsula in Schleswig-Holstein in Germany.
- The large bird is correctly spelled "swan".

== See also ==
- Svan (disambiguation)
