= Katnaghbyur, Lori =

Katnaghbyur Կաթնաղբյուր
- Location within Armenia
- Coordinates: 41°02′15″N 44°13′13″E
- Country: Armenia
- Marz (Province): Lori
- Elevation: 1,650 m (5,410 ft)

Population (2011)
  - Total: 767
- Time zone: UTC+4 ( )
  - Summer (DST): UTC+5

Katnaghbyur (Armenian: Կաթնաղբյուր, also Romanized as Kat’naghbyur, Katnakhpyur, Katnagbyur, and Katnaghpyur; formerly, Koturbulag) is a hamlet in the Lori Province of Armenia.
