= Akunk =

Village in Gegharkunik, Armenia

Akunk Ակունք
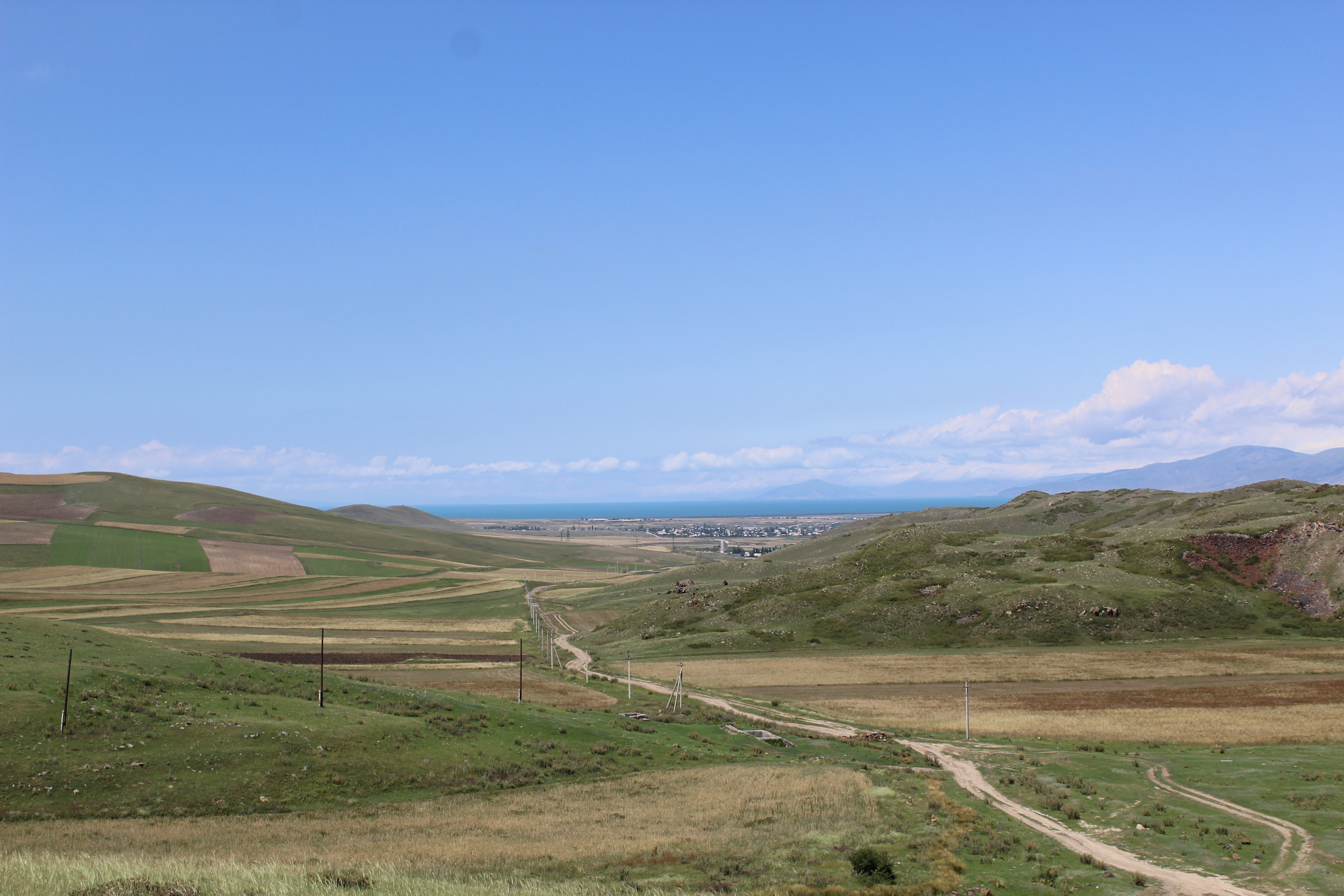

- Location within Armenia Location within Gegharkunik
- Coordinates: 40°09′26″N 45°43′35″E
- Country: Armenia
- Province: Gegharkunik
- Municipality: Vardenis
- Elevation: 1,965 m (6,447 ft)

Population (2011)
  - Total: 4,443
- Time zone: UTC+4 (AMT)
- Postal code: 1604

Akunk (Armenian: Ակունք) is a village in the Vardenis Municipality of the Gegharkunik Province of Armenia.

== History ==
The village was founded on the site of a Bronze Age settlement and to the west of Akunk, there is a cyclopean fort, Klor Dar, dating from between the 6th and 4th centuries BC. There are two Tukh Manuk pilgrimage sites in the village as well.

== Gallery ==
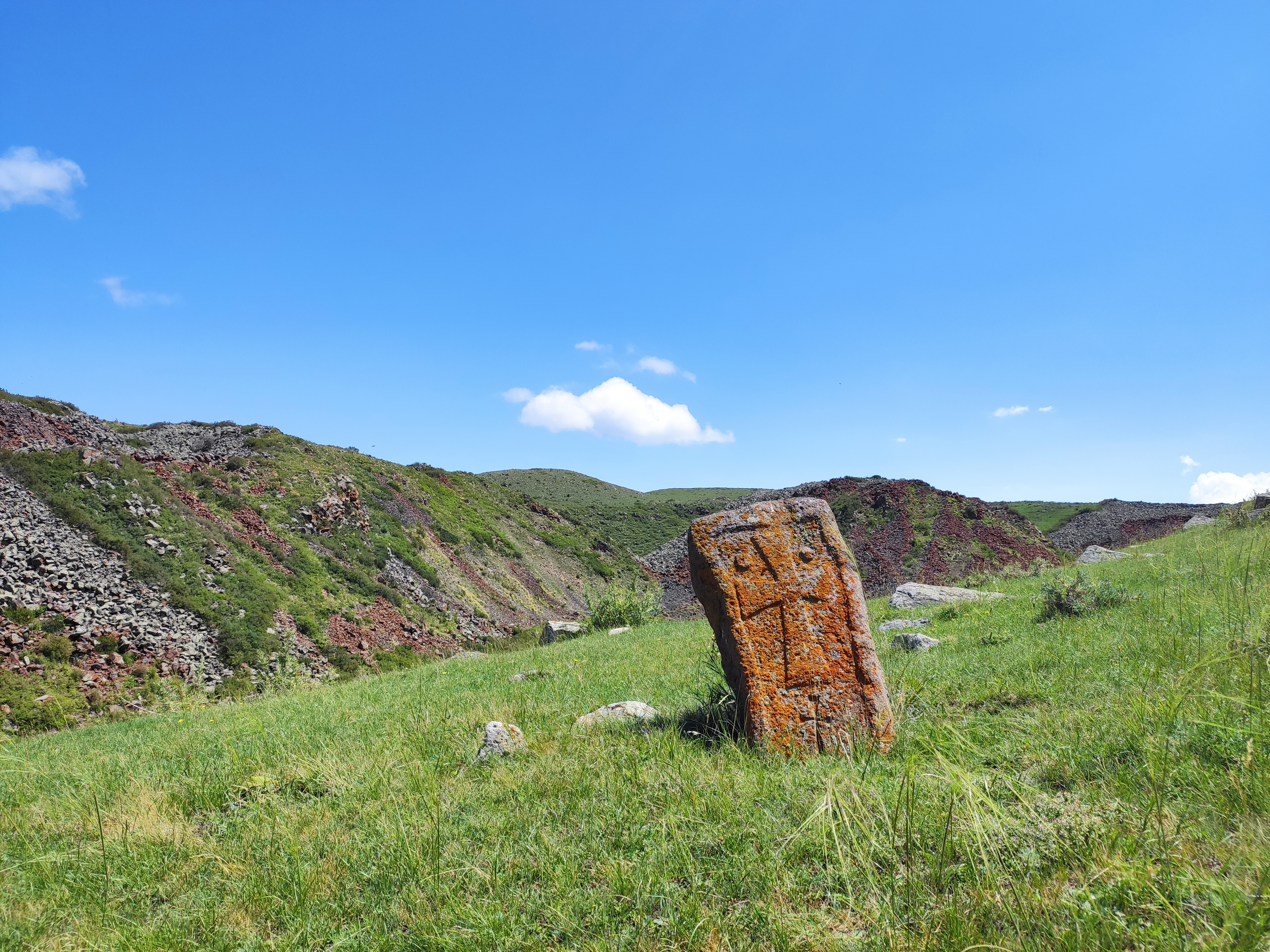
Khachkar and scenery near Akunk

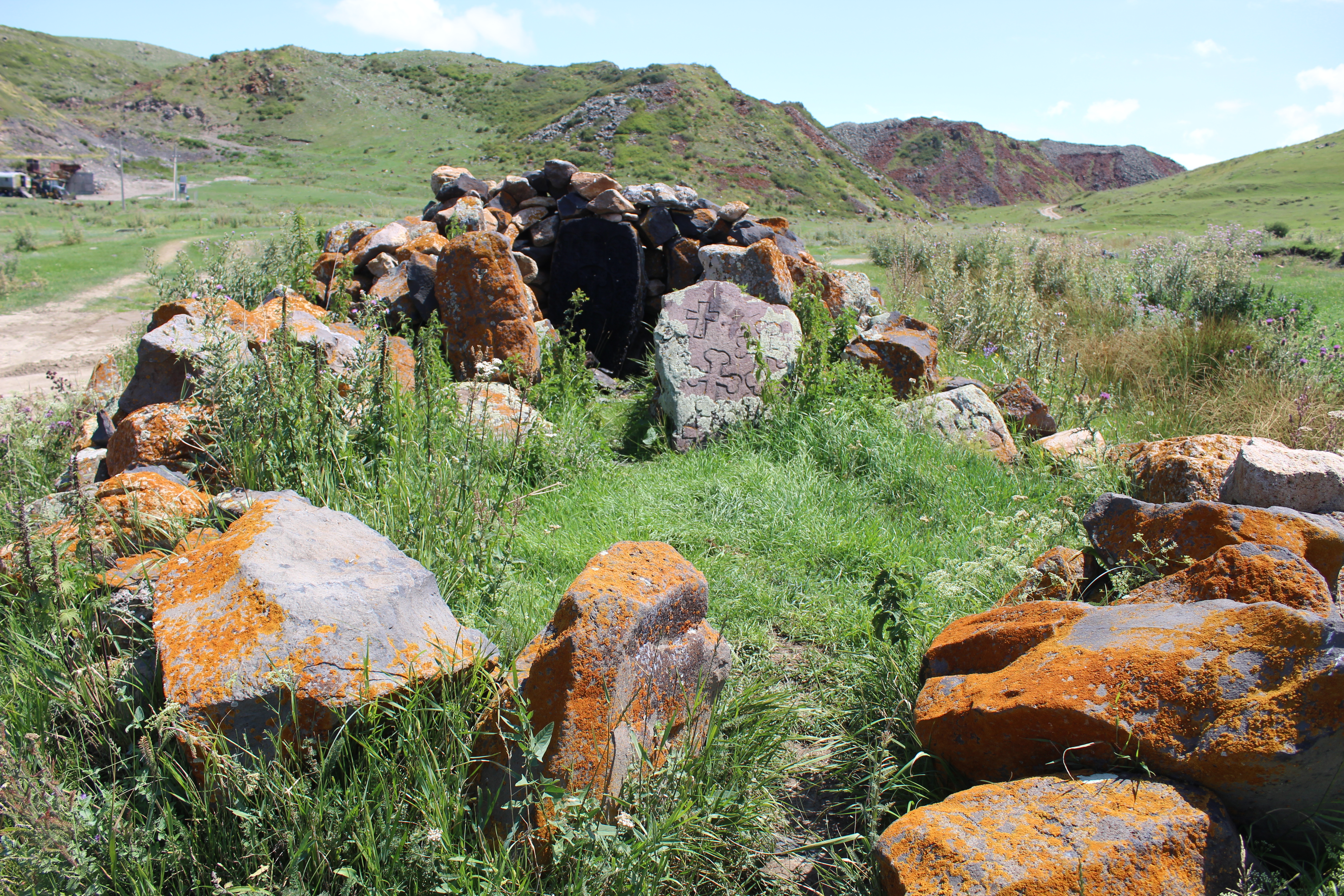
Hin Gomer church ruin

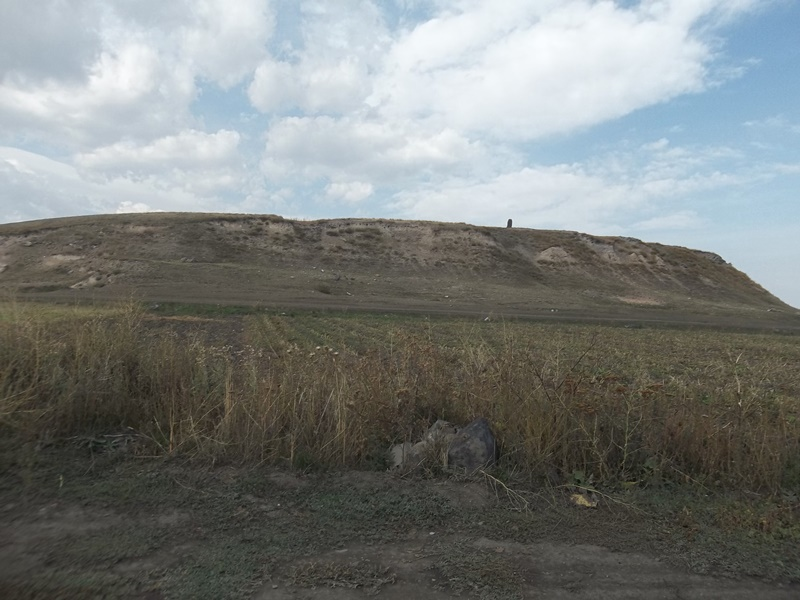
Klor Dar cyclopean fort, 6th-4th century BC.

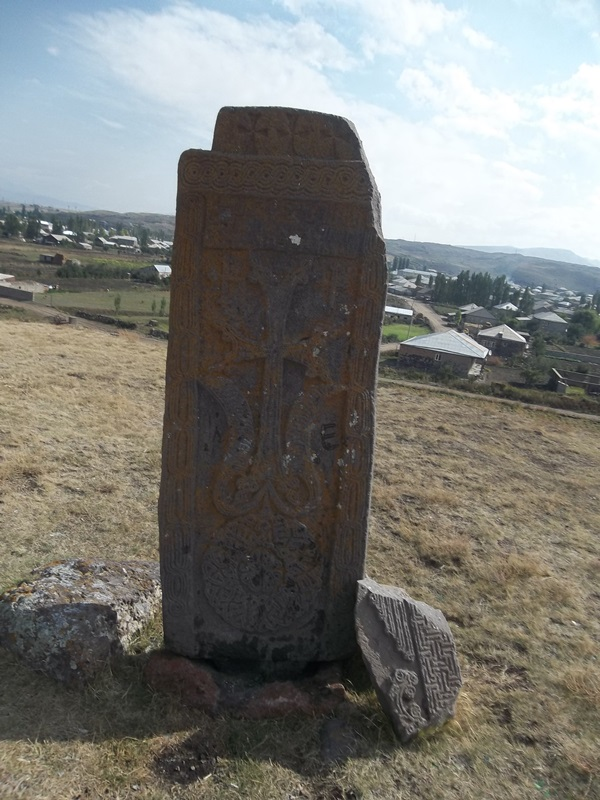
A khachkar, and a view of Akunk

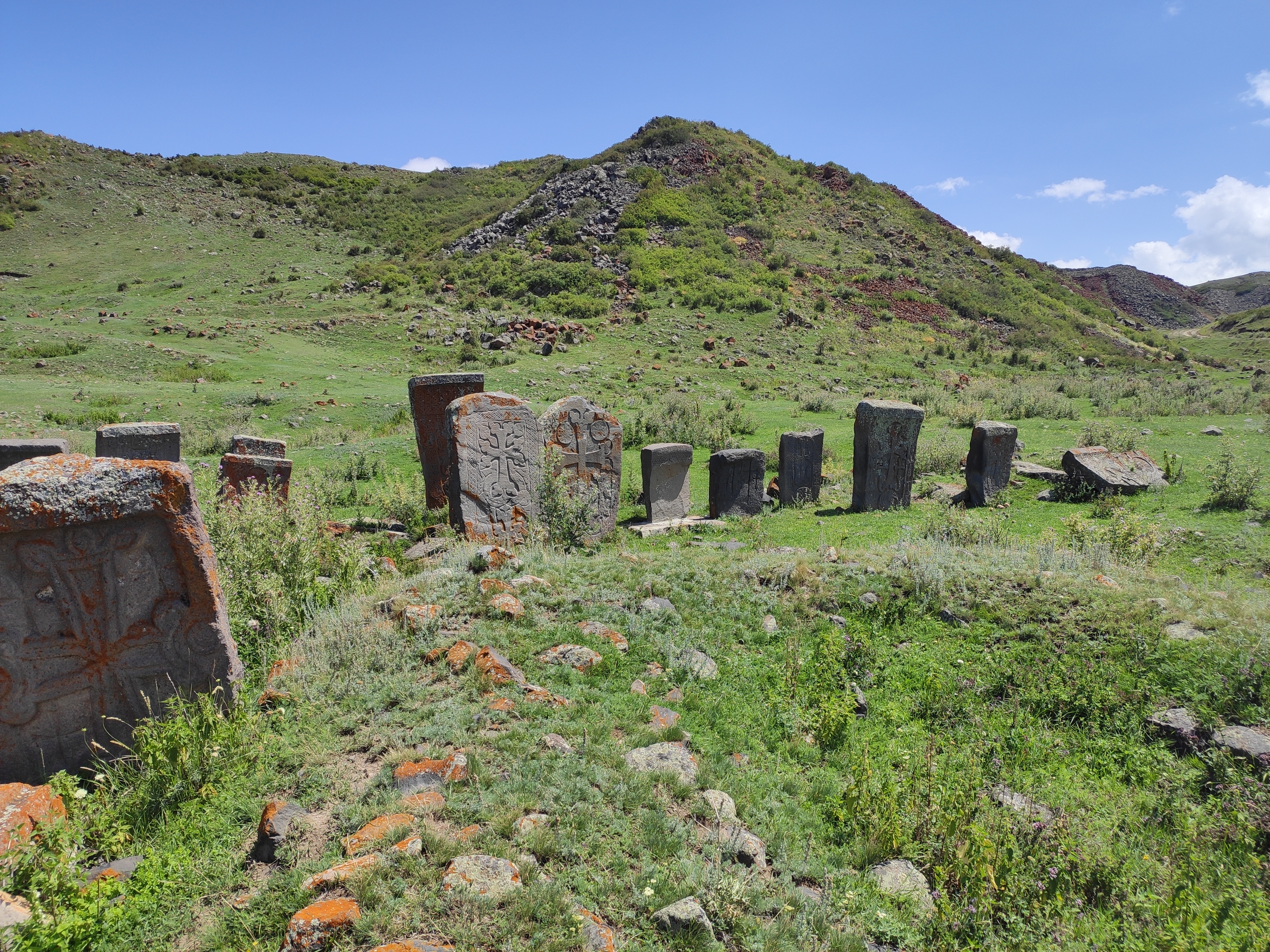
Hin Gomer khachkars
