= Lusaghbyur, Aragatsotn =

Lusaghbyur Լուսաղբյուր
- Location within Armenia Location within Aragatsotn
- Coordinates: 40°23′08″N 44°22′36″E
- Country: Armenia
- Province: Aragatsotn
- Municipality: Ashtarak
- Elevation: 1,780 m (5,840 ft)
- Time zone: UTC+4

Lusaghbyur (Armenian: Լուսաղբյուր) is an abandoned village in the Ashtarak Municipality of the Aragatsotn Province of Armenia.
