= Jrvezh =

Jrvezh Ջրվեժ
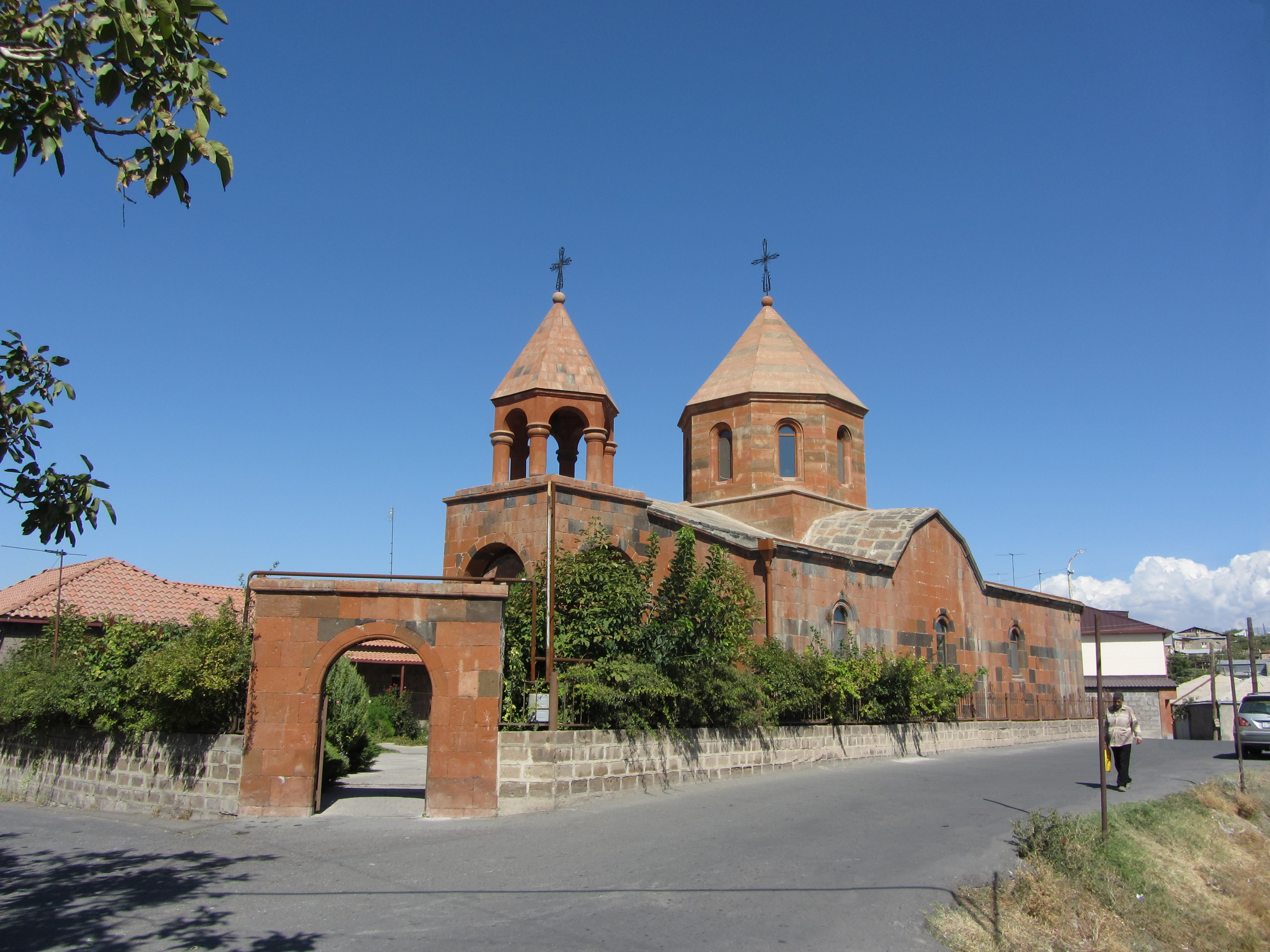
- Surp Katoghike church of Jrvezh, opened in 1891

- Location within Armenia
- Coordinates: 40°11′08″N 44°35′13″E
- Country: Armenia
- Marz (Province): Kotayk
- First mentioned: 5th century

Area
  - Total: 8.43 km^{2} (3.25 sq mi)
- Elevation: 1,360 m (4,460 ft)

Population (2011 census)
  - Total: 7,198
  - Density: 854/km^{2} (2,210/sq mi)
- Time zone: UTC+4 ( )
- Website: Official website

Jrvezh (Armenian: Ջրվեժ), meaning "waterfall", is a major village in the Kotayk Province of Armenia, located at the eastern outskirts of the capital Yerevan. The village is 45 km south of the provincial capital Hrazdan, and 9 km from the town of Abovyan.

The name of the village appeared for the first time in history during the 5th century by historian Ghazar Parpetsi.

The village is home to many historical sites including the remains of 2 chapels dating back to the 7th and 13th centuries respectively.

The present-day Surp Katoghike church of Jrvezh was opened in 1891.

As of the 2011 census, the population of the village is 7,198.

== Gallery ==
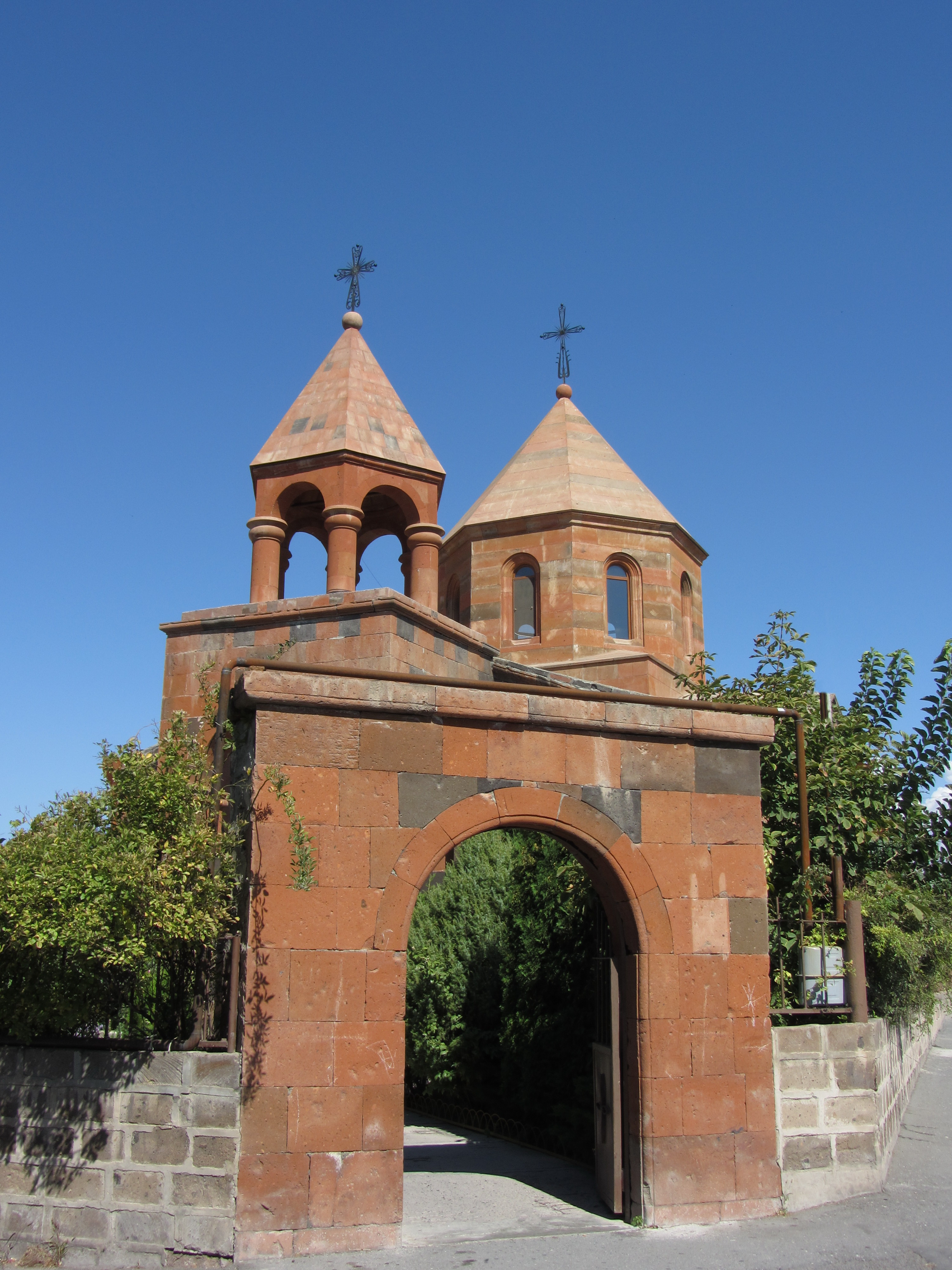
Surp Katoghike church

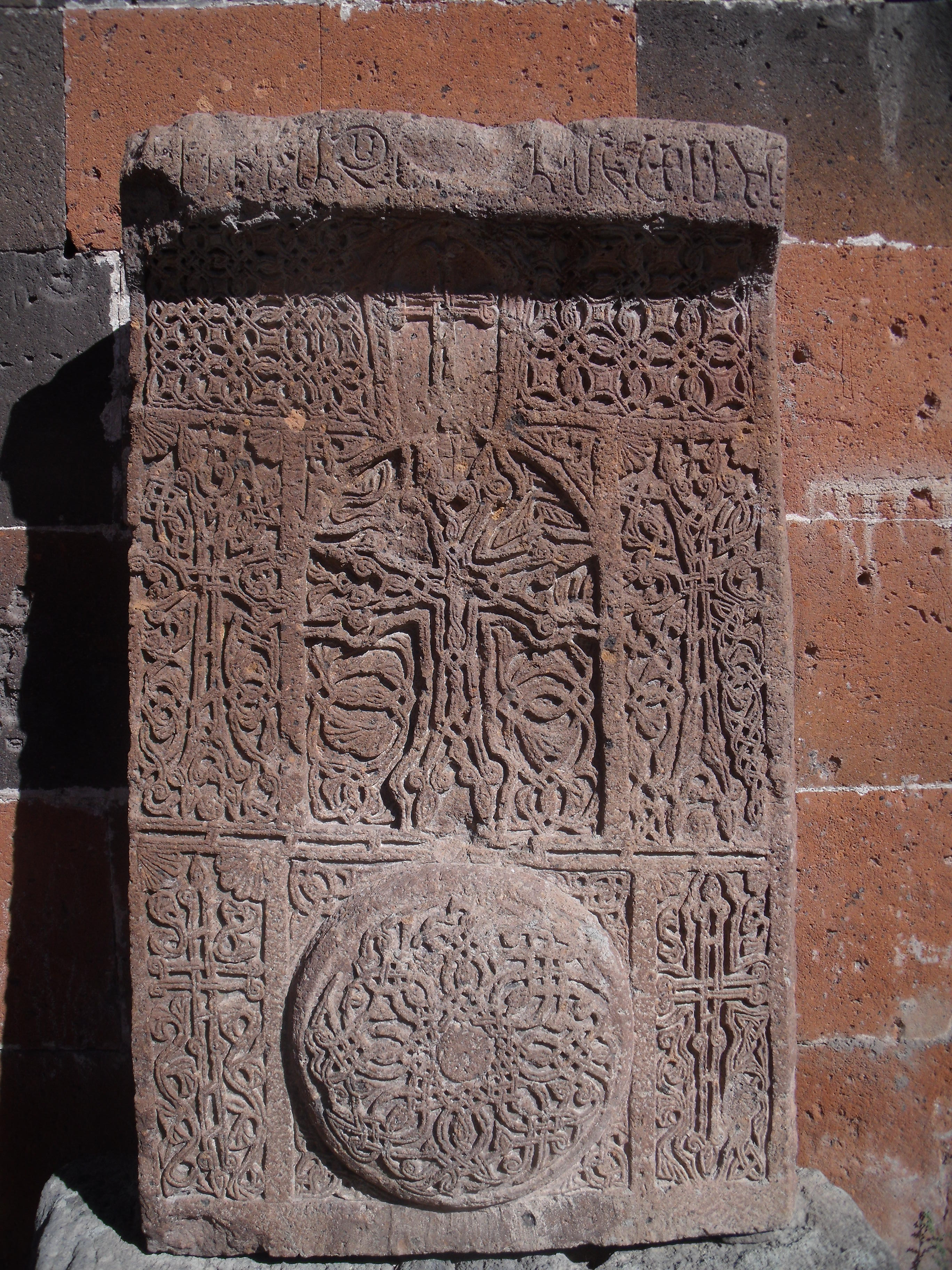
Khachkar near Surp Katoghike church

== See also ==
- Kotayk Province
