= Lusaghbyur, Shirak =

Village in Shirak, Armenia

Lusaghbyur Լուսաղբյուր
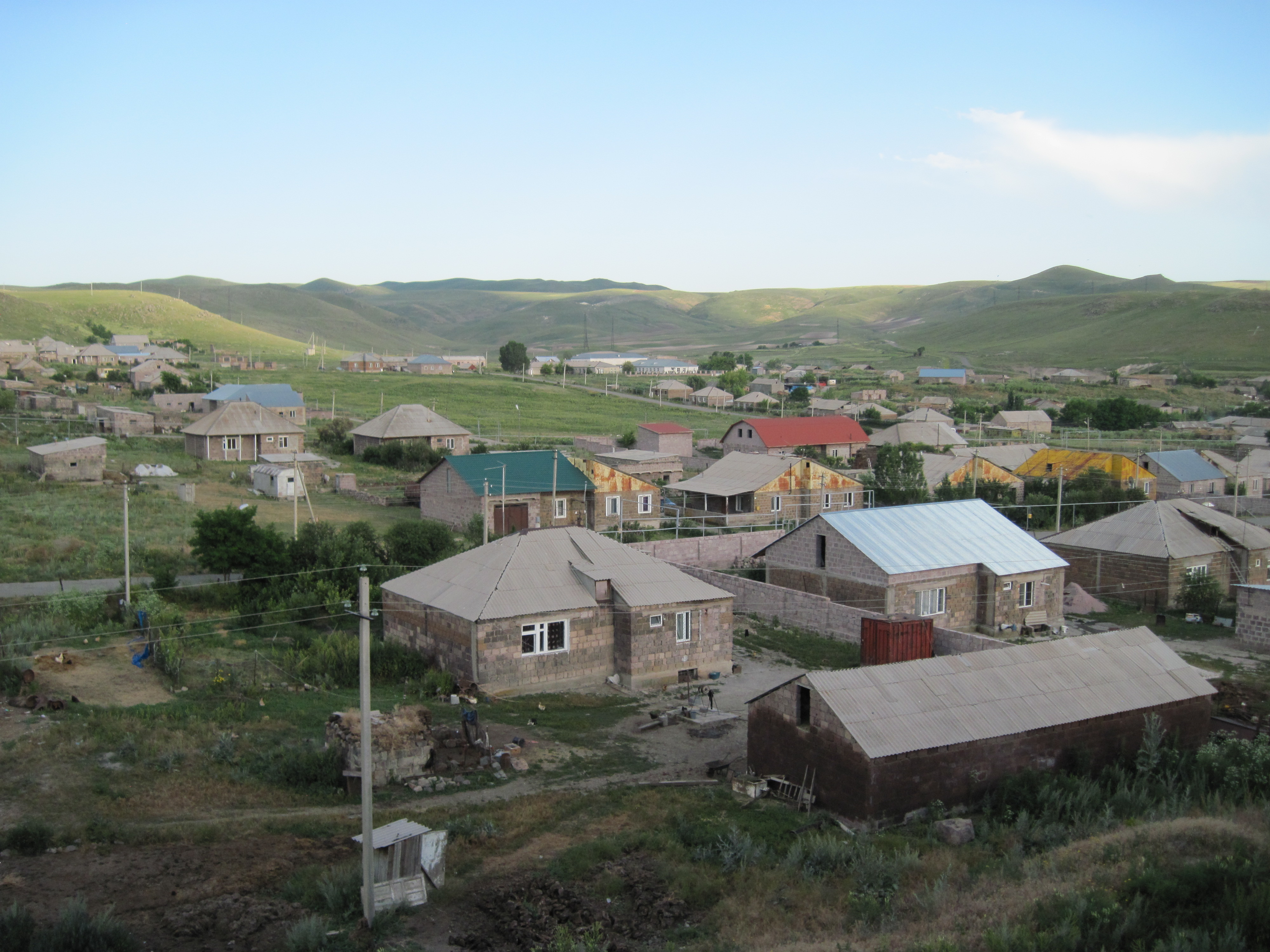
- Lusaghbyur

- Location within Armenia Location within Shirak
- Coordinates: 40°38′44″N 43°44′58″E
- Country: Armenia
- Province: Shirak
- Municipality: Ani

Population (2011)
  - Total: 536
- Time zone: UTC+4
  - Summer (DST): UTC+5

Lusaghbyur (Armenian: Լուսաղբյուր) is a village in the Ani Municipality of the Shirak Province of Armenia, near the border of Turkey.

== Demographics ==
Historical population
Year	Pop.	±% p.a.
1831	225	—
1897	1,128	+2.47%
1926	693	−1.67%
1939	947	+2.43%
1959	698	−1.51%
1979	556	−1.13%
2001	567	+0.09%
2011	536	−0.56%
