= Harants Anapat Monastery =

Harants napat Monastery
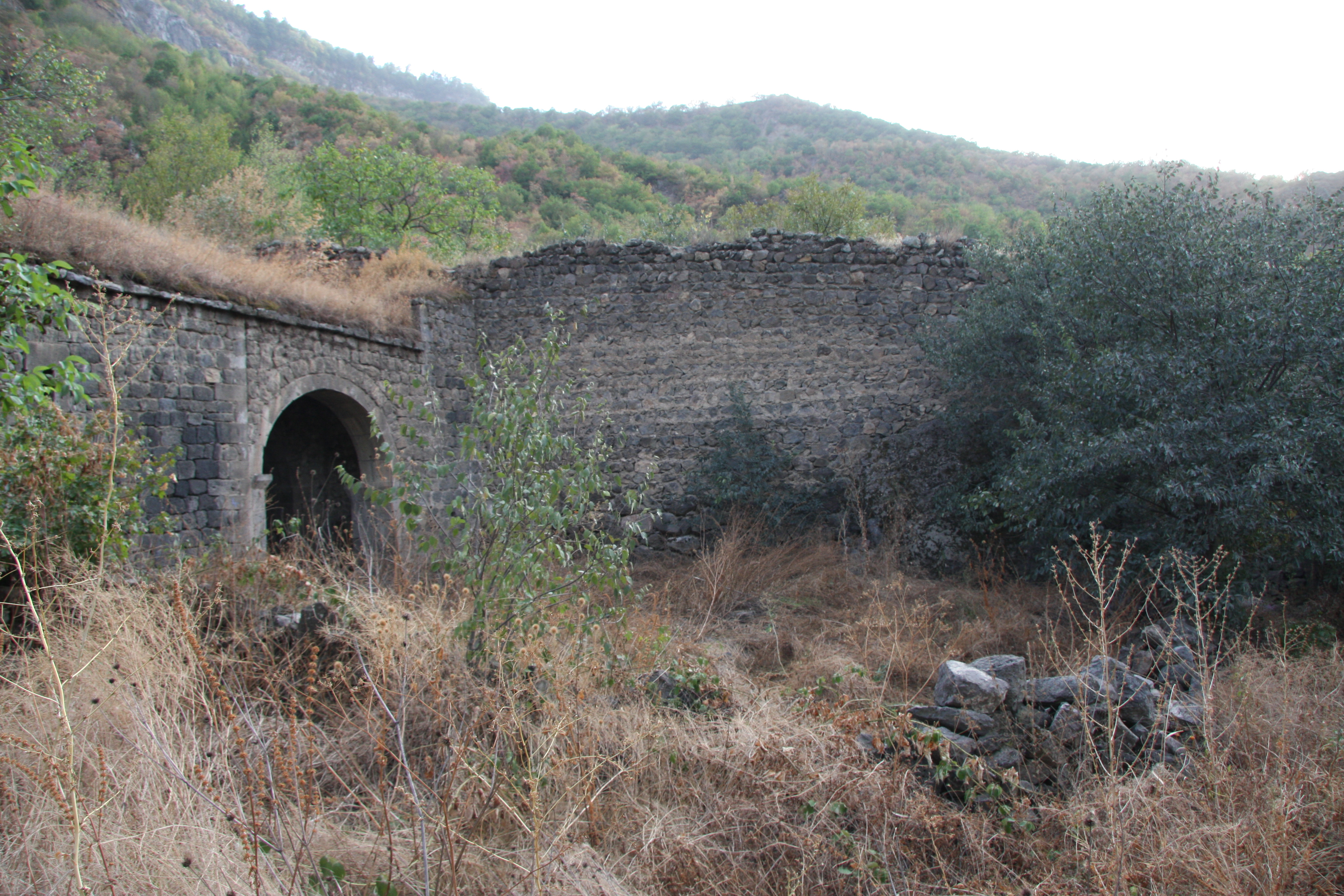
- Basic data

Religion
- Affiliation: Armenian Apostolic Church
- Province: Syunik
- Ecclesiastical or organizational status: defunct

Location
- Location: Halidzor
- Country: Armenia
- Interactive map of Harants napat Monastery
- Administration: Diocese of Syunik

Architecture
- Type: Armenian architecture
- Founder: Archimandrite Sargis of Saghmosavank, Kirakos from Trebizond
- Completed: 1613
- Monuments: Church, refectory, chapel and the remains of the fence

Harants Anapat Monastery (or The Great Desertof Syunik), an architectural complex in the Syunik province of Armenia, near Halidzor village, on the right bank of the Vorotan River.

== History ==
The exact time of the establishment is unknown. It is assumed that the monastery was built in 1608–1613. The founders were archimandrite Sargis of Saghmosavank and priest Kirakos from Trebizond. According to Arakel Davrizhetsi, before that they had left for a vow to Jerusalem, got acquainted with the statutes of deserts-hermitages (religious retreats), then visited Tatev Monastery, Tanahat Monastery. Later on in search of more peaceful and safe place, they established a desert on the right bank of the Vorotan River, built a church and small cells for the solitary.

== Architecture ==
The monastic complex, as we have now, consists of the church with vestibule-hall from the west and adjoining two rooms from the north (a three-nave basilica with two pairs of gables), arched, a refectory with stretched symmetry and the remains of the fence, which (except for the church) were built after the earthquake of 1658, when all the previous buildings in the Desert were destroyed, and the church slid down to its present place. Two years after the earthquake, the congregation moved and established the Great Desert of Tatev (Tatevi Anapat). In the beginning of 18th century, the Harants desert was revived, the leaders of the Tatev monastery made repairs and constructions here. The complex and the church of the Harants desert are extremely important for revealing the Armenian architectural features of the late Middle Ages. The founders of the other deserts of Armenia in the 17th century came from here, spreading the solutions of the composition of the complex and individual buildings.

== See also ==
- Tatevi Anapat
- Tatev Monastery
- Jerusalem
- Hermitage (religious retreat)
