= Gregory of Tatev =

Armenian philosopher (1346–1410)

Saint Gregory of Tatev Գրիգոր Տաթևացի
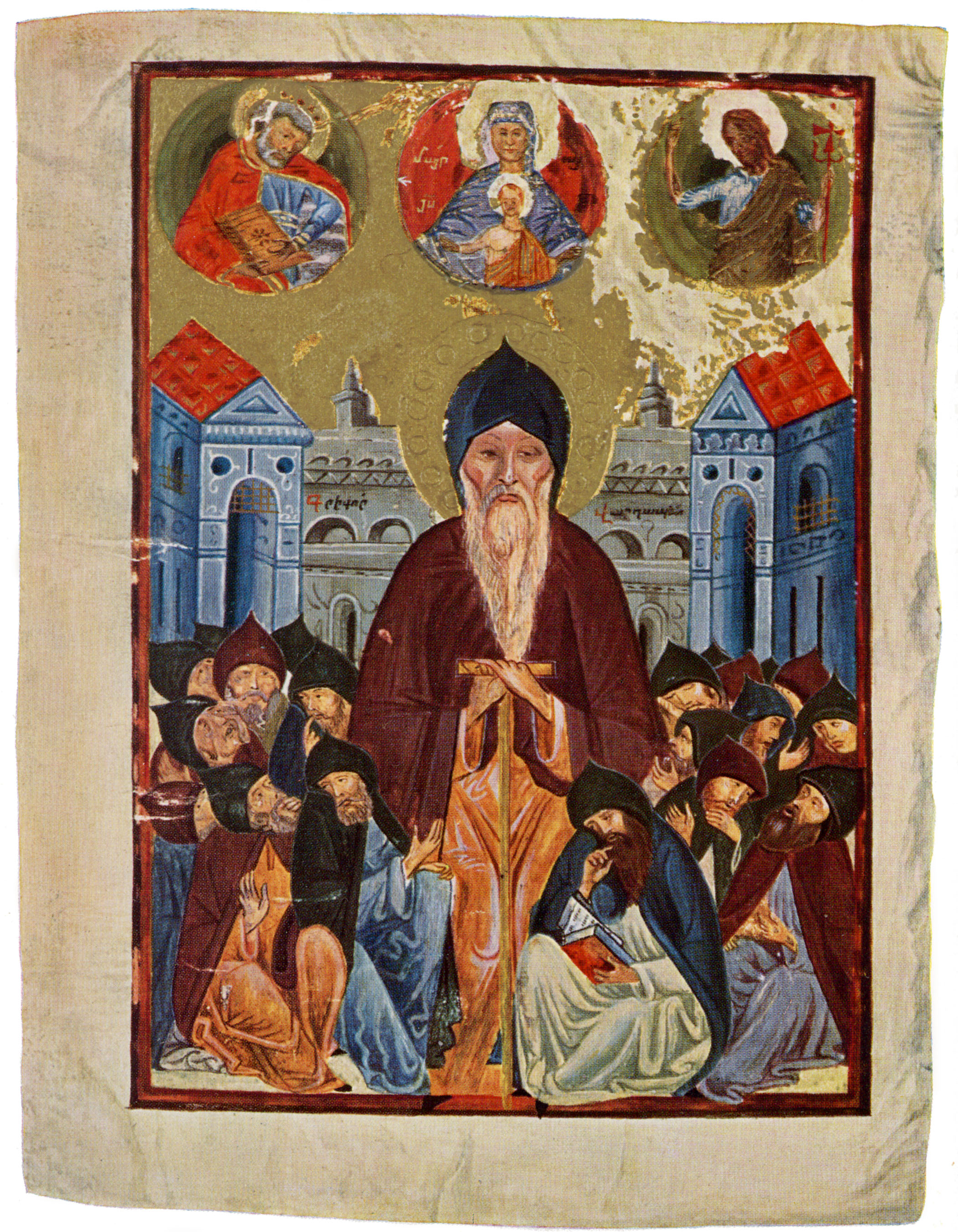
- Grigor Tatevatsi (from a 15th-century Armenian manuscript)
- Born: 1346; Tmkaberd (now in Georgia)
- Died: 1409 or 1410
- Venerated in: Armenian Apostolic Church

Gregory of Tatev, or Grigor Tatevatsi (Armenian: Գրիգոր Տաթևացի) (1346–1409 or 1410) was an Armenian philosopher, theologian and a saint in the Armenian Apostolic Church.

Gregory was born in Tmkaberd in Georgia or Vayots Dzor in Siunik. He was educated at the monasteries of Tatev and Metzop.

Gregory was a faithful Miaphysite, at a time when the Armenian church was building relations with the Dyophysite Roman Catholic Church. He wrote against uniting the Armenian church with Rome.

In addition to his opposition to the union with the Roman Catholic Church, Gregory of Tatev also wrote extensively against Islam, as well as against Judaism and various heresies. In his major theological work, the Book of Questions (Girk’ Harc’mants, completed in 1397), Gregory defended the core principles of the Armenian Apostolic Church against other faiths such as Islam and the Fratres Unitores. He also composed a separate treatise against the Tajiks (a medieval Armenian term for Muslims), in which he polemically opposes core Islamic teachings, particularly on prophecy and holy war (jihad). Gregory’s works provide an important historical source for understanding medieval Armenian-Christian perspectives on Islam and interfaith dialogue. His arguments were grounded in scripture, patristic tradition, and logic, and reflect the broader theological resistance of the Armenian Church against external religious pressures.

Gregory also authored: Voskeporik (“Golden Belly”) – a condensed version of the Book of Questions intended for lay readers. Karozgirk’ (“Book of Sermons”) – a compilation of 344 sermons divided into winter and summer volumes, completed in 1407. Commentaries on the Wisdom Books of Solomon (Proverbs, Ecclesiastes, Wisdom of Solomon, and Song of Songs), presented in a question-and-answer format. These were translated into English in modern times.

A monument to Tatevatsi was unveiled on October 16, 2010 in Goris, Armenia.
