= Tatevi Anapat =

17th-century Armenian monastery

Tatevi Anapat Տաթեւի անապատ
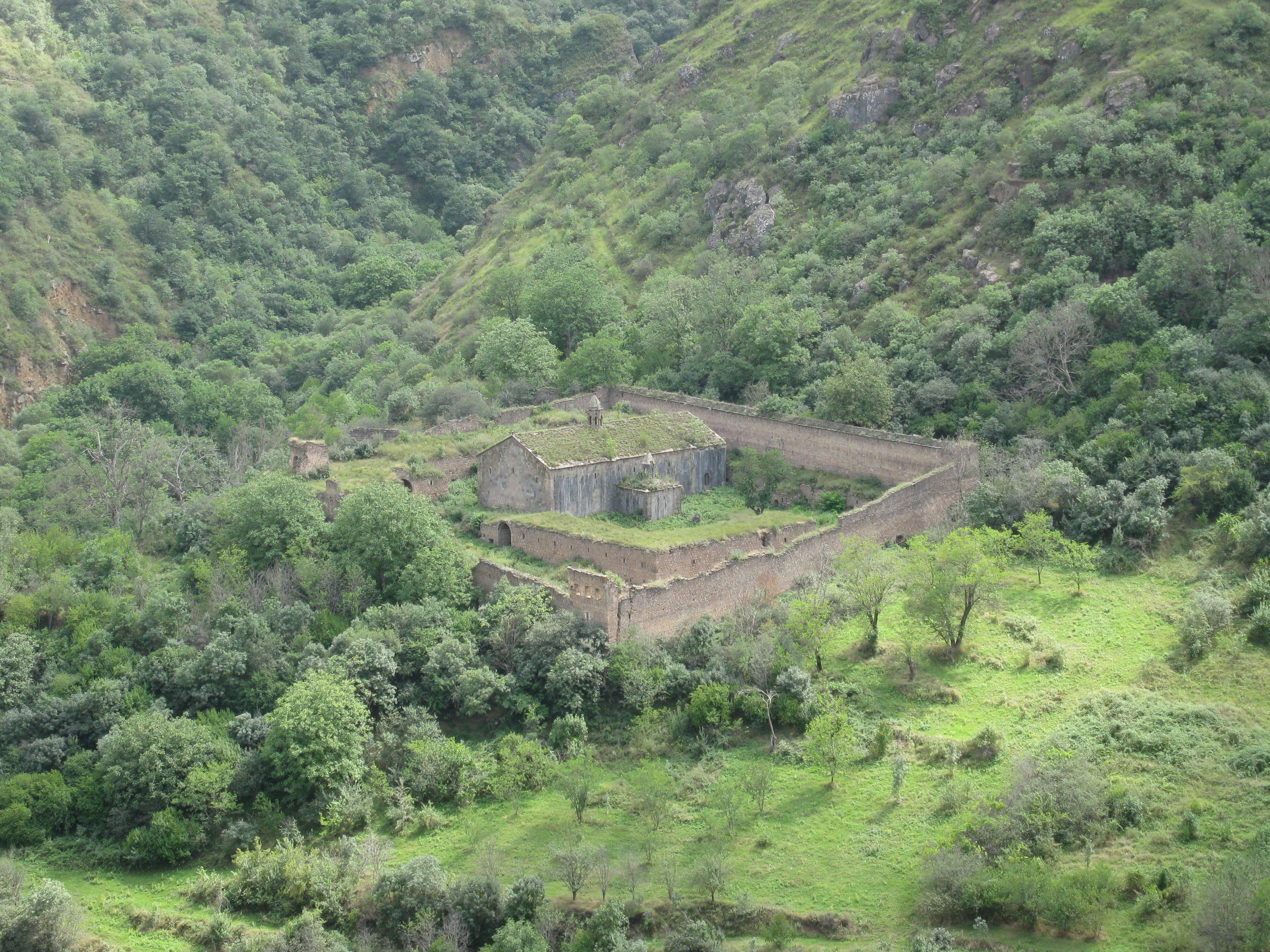

- Location within Armenia Location within Syunik Province

Religion
- Affiliation: Armenian Apostolic Church
- Province: Syunik Province

Location
- Location: Vorotan valley, near Tatev village, Syunik Province, Armenia
- Coordinates: 39.387665°N 46.260806°E

Architecture
- Style: Armenian
- Groundbreaking: 17th-18th centuries

The Great Hermitage of Tatev (Armenian: Տաթևի Մեծ Անապատ, romanized: Tatevi Mets Anapat) is a 17th-century Armenian monastery located in the Vorotan river valley in the Syunik Province of Armenia.

== History ==
The Great Hermitage of Tatev, which used to be a renowned religious center, is situated on the right bank of the river Vorotan, where the river intersects with its tributary Tatev. It was constructed in the 1660s by order of Catholicos Hakob IV Jughayetsi following the destruction of the nearby Harants (Fathers') Hermitage of Halidzor by an earthquake in 1658. The Harants Hermitage was located a few kilometers away from the Hermitage of Tatev. The layout of the Great Hermitage of Tatev is identical to that of the older hermitage, only with larger dimensions. The main part of the hermitage is surrounded by rectangular lime mortar walls with towers. An adjacent structure with a table-shaped plan is located on the southern side of the hermitage.

== See also ==
- Tatev, a nearby 9th-century Armenian monastic complex
