= Tatev Municipality =

Tatev Տաթև
- Rural Community
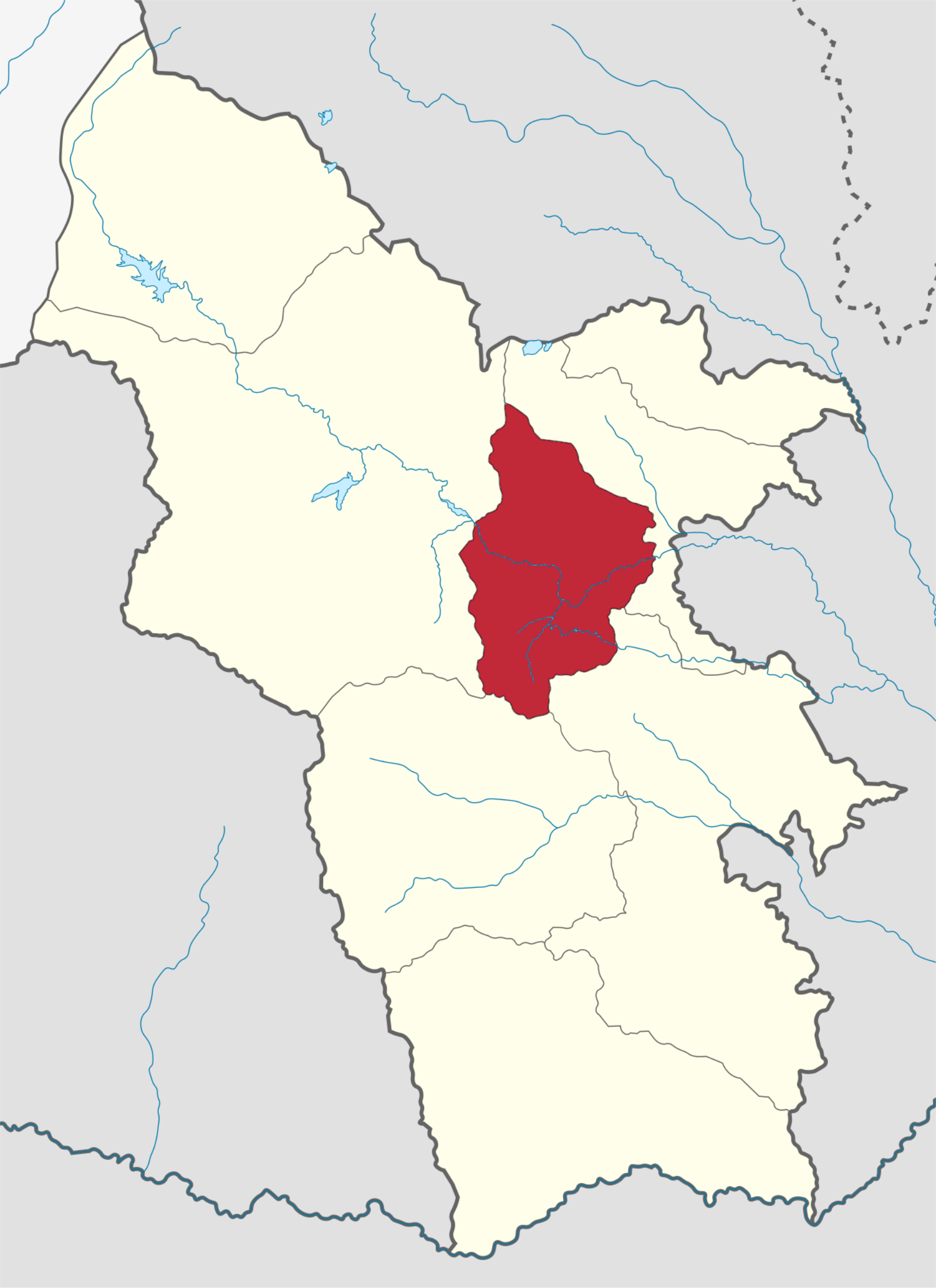
- Coordinates: 39°25′N 46°18′E
- Country: Armenia
- Province: Syunik
- Formed: 24 November 2015
- Administrative centre: Shinuhayr

Government
  - Mayor: Samvel Lalayan

Population (2011 census)
  - Total: 6,260
- Time zone: AMT (UTC+04)
- Postal code: 3201–3519
- ISO 3166 code: AM-SU
- FIPS 10-4: AM08

Tatev Municipality, referred to as Tatev Community (Armenian: Տաթև Համայնք Tatev Hamaynk), is a rural community and administrative subdivision of Syunik Province of Armenia, at the south of the country. Consisted of a group of settlements, its administrative centre is the village of Shinuhayr.

== Included settlements ==
Settlement	Type	Population (2011 census)
Shinuhayr	Village, administrative centre	2,661
Halidzor	Village	551
Harzhis	Village	879
Kashuni	Village	11
Khot	Village	942
Svarants	Village	264
Tandzatap	Village	88
Tatev	Village	864

== Politics ==
Tatev Municipal Assembly (Armenian: Տաթևի համայնքապետարան, Tatevi hamaynqapetaran) is the representative body in Tatev Municipality, consisting of 15 members which are elected every five years. The last election was held in October 2021. Samvel Lalayan of Shant Alliance Nationalist Party was elected mayor.

Party	2021	Current Municipal Assembly
Civil Contract	**7**	
**Shant Alliance Nationalist Party**	**6**	
**Country of Living**	**2**	
Total	15	

Ruling coalition or party marked in bold.

== See also ==
- Syunik Province
