= Aramazd (disambiguation) =

Aramazd was the chief and creator god in the Armenian version of Zoroastrianism.

Aramazd may also refer to:

- Aramazd mountains in Armenia
- Aramazd Stepanian, Armenian actor, producer, and director
