= Svarants =

Svarants Սվարանց
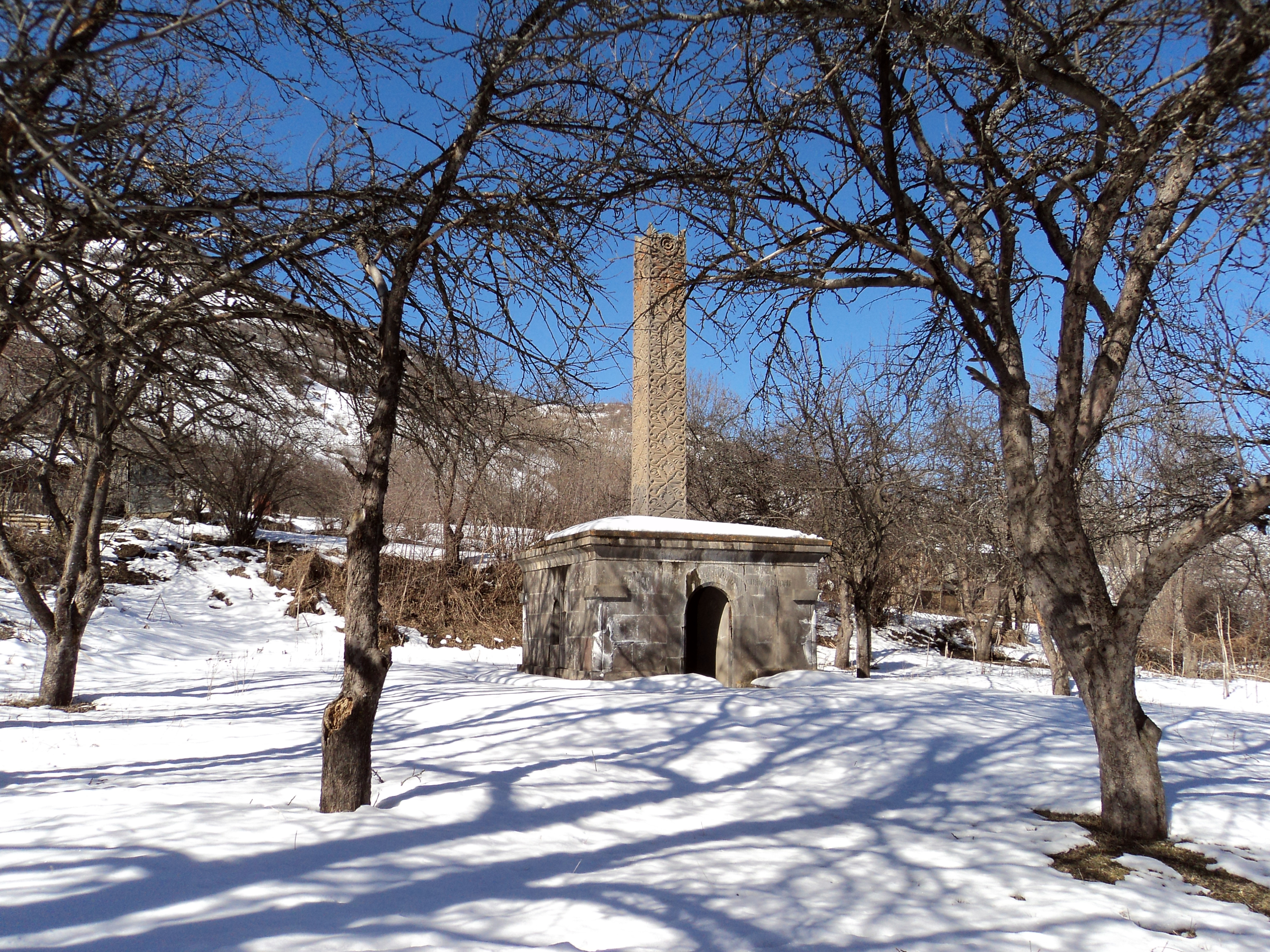
- WWII monument in Svarants

- Location within Armenia Location within Syunik Province
- Coordinates: 39°22′00″N 46°13′08″E
- Country: Armenia
- Province: Syunik
- Municipality: Tatev

Area
  - Total: 16.28 km^{2} (6.29 sq mi)

Population (2011)
  - Total: 264
  - Density: 16.2/km^{2} (42.0/sq mi)
- Time zone: UTC+4 (AMT)

Svarants (Armenian: Սվարանց) is a village in the Tatev Municipality of the Syunik Province in Armenia.

== Geography ==
The village is located in the upper reaches of the Tatev River, in the valley, on the northern slopes of Aramazd Mountain, at an altitude of 1750-1800 m above sea level. The distance from Kapan, the regional center of Syunik province, is about 51 km.

The administrative area of the village occupies 1621.20 ha, of which agricultural lands are 1562.95 ha. According to the operational purpose, the agricultural lands consist of: arable land 191.24ha, grasslands 42.16ha, pastures 799.38ha and other land types 527ha.

== History ==
In historical literature the village is first mentioned as Tsuraberd in the 10th century. In his work "History of the State of Sisakan", Stepanos Orbelyan mentioned it among the villages which rose up against ecclesiastical and feudal orders. In 2025, the Tufenkian Foundation announced the construction of a new neighbourhood for Armenians displaced from Nagorno-Karabakh. The neighbourhood, consisting of 20 houses, was built on the outskirts of the village. The first 10 families, originally from the region of Martakert, moved into the village in November 2025.

== Demographics ==
The National Statistical Service of the Republic of Armenia (ARMSTAT) reported its population was 270 in 2010, down from 360 at the 2001 census.
