= Davit Bek, Armenia =

Davit Bek Դավիթ Բեկ
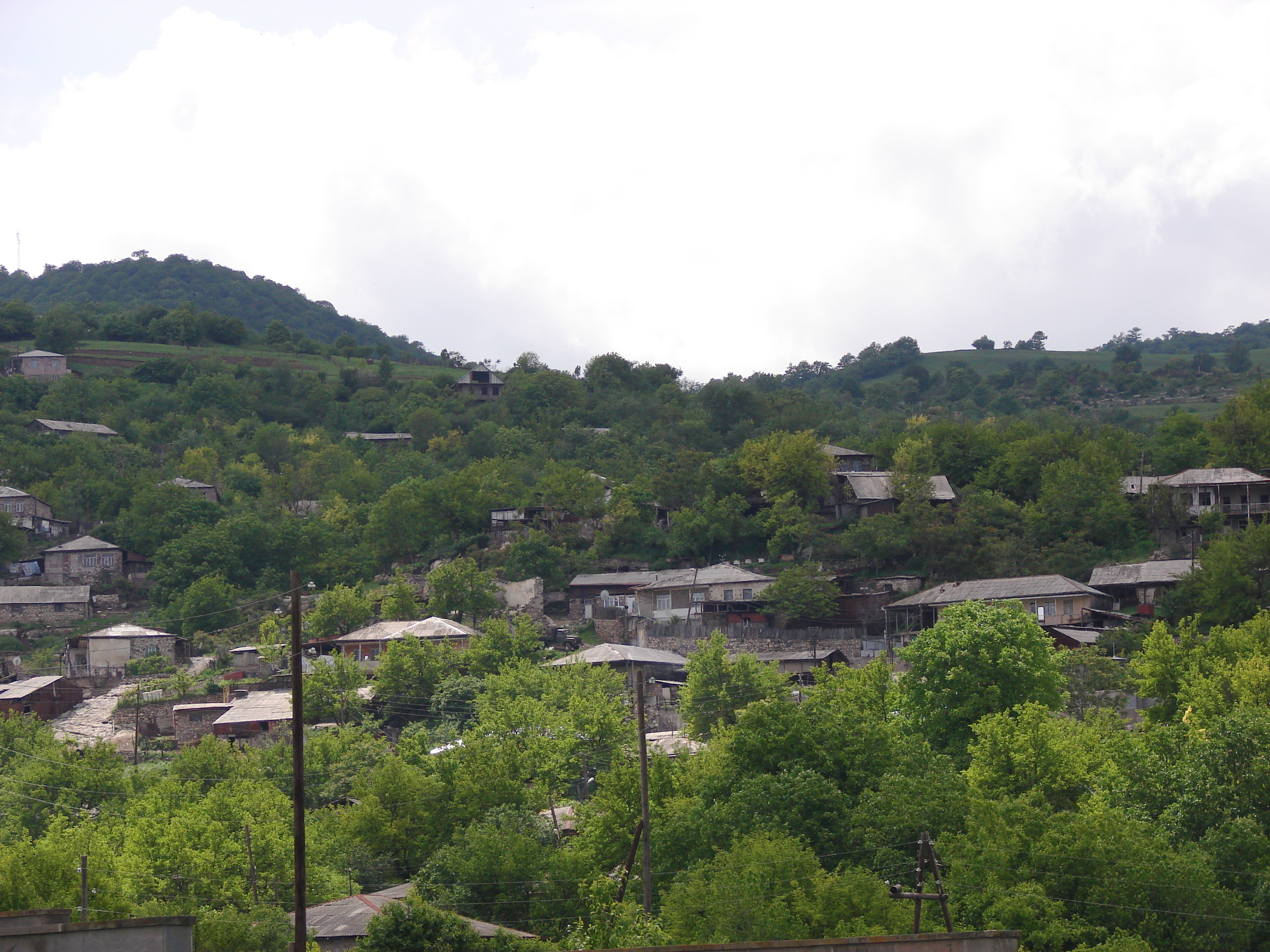

- Location within Armenia Location within Syunik Province
- Coordinates: 39°19′05″N 46°29′43″E
- Country: Armenia
- Province: Syunik
- Municipality: Kapan

Population (2011)
  - Total: 796
- Time zone: UTC+4 (AMT)

Davit Bek (Armenian: Դավիթ Բեկ) is a village in the Kapan Municipality of the Syunik Province in Armenia. Located in the Kashun river valley, 28 kilometers from the regional center of Kapan, it lies 1150 meters above sea level. It is named after the Armenian patriotic leader Davit Bek.

The village is the birthplace of Aram Manukian, the Armenian revolutionary leader and the founder of the First Republic of Armenia. The Surp Gayane Church of Davit Bek was opened in 2008.

== Etymology ==
The village was previously known as Zeyva or Zeyva Mure before being renamed to Davit Bek on June 29, 1949, in honor of the 17th century Armenian military commander Davit Bek who founded the Principality of Kapan.

== Description ==
Davit Bek is located in a forested valley among the Bargushat range of the Zangezur Mountains of Southern Armenia. It has a mild climate and beautiful nature. Its local Armenian residents are mostly engaged in agriculture such as grain cultivation, tobacco, fruit, vegetable, and livestock farming. The houses are large and built traditionally of stone. A rest house by the name of Karmrakar is located in the vicinity of the village.

== History ==
Lying 3 kilometers away from the village is the medieval church and village of Takh whose inhabitants relocated to present-day Davit Bek in the 19th century. Earlier inhabitation of the area of Davit Bek is evidenced by a 10th-century tombstone on the far side of the village. In the 20th century, the village was part of the Ghapan region of the Armenian SSR (1920–1991). During that time, a secondary school, cultural center, kindergarten, liberty, maternity hospital and veterinary clinic were built. In 1981, the Kapan branch of the “Masis” footwear production opened in Davit Bek. In addition, a reservoir for irrigation purposes was built here.

== Demographics ==
The 2011 Armenia census reported its population as 796, down from 809 at the 2001 census. The population is almost entirely ethnic Armenian and belongs to the Armenian Apostolic Church.

Historical population
Year	Pop.	±% p.a.
1897	714	—
1926	761	+0.22%
1939	859	+0.94%
1959	815	−0.26%
1970	931	+1.22%
1979	800	−1.67%
2001	809	+0.05%
2004	771	−1.59%

== Gallery ==
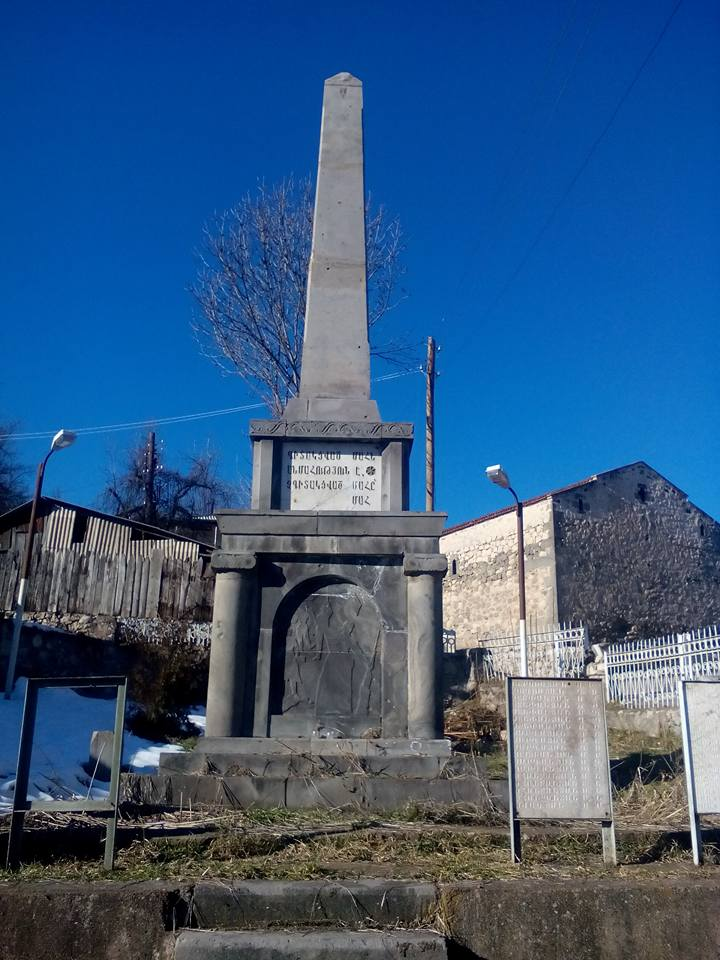
WWII monument

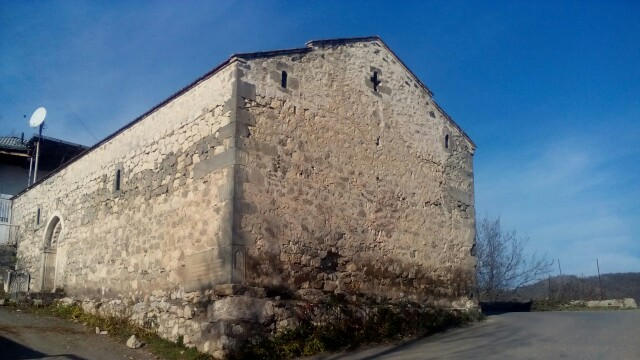
St. Stepanos Church (1866)

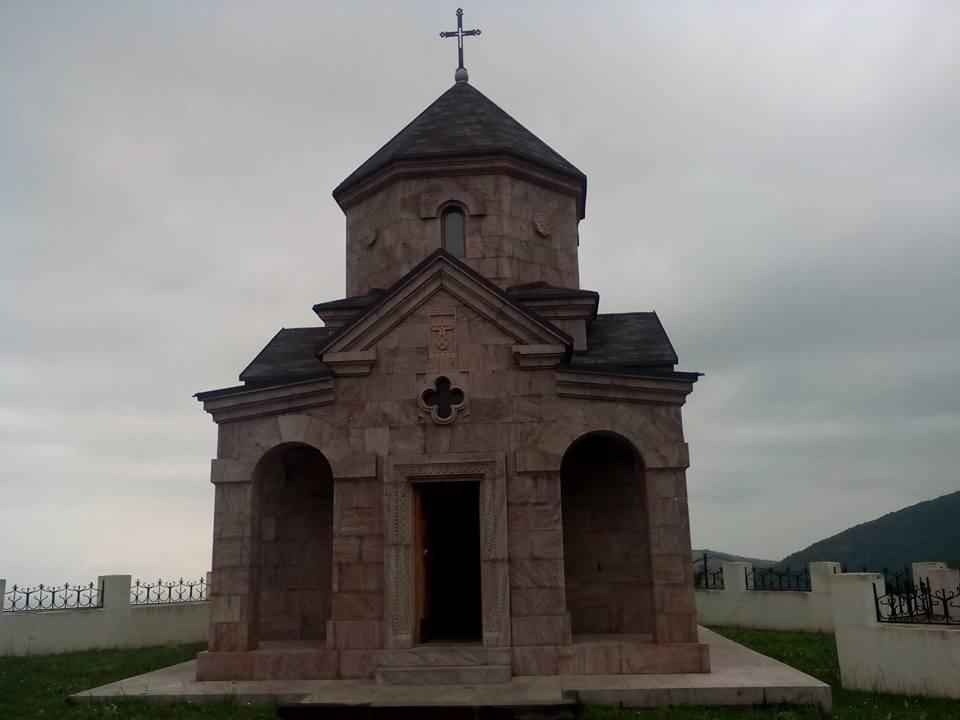
St. Gayane Church

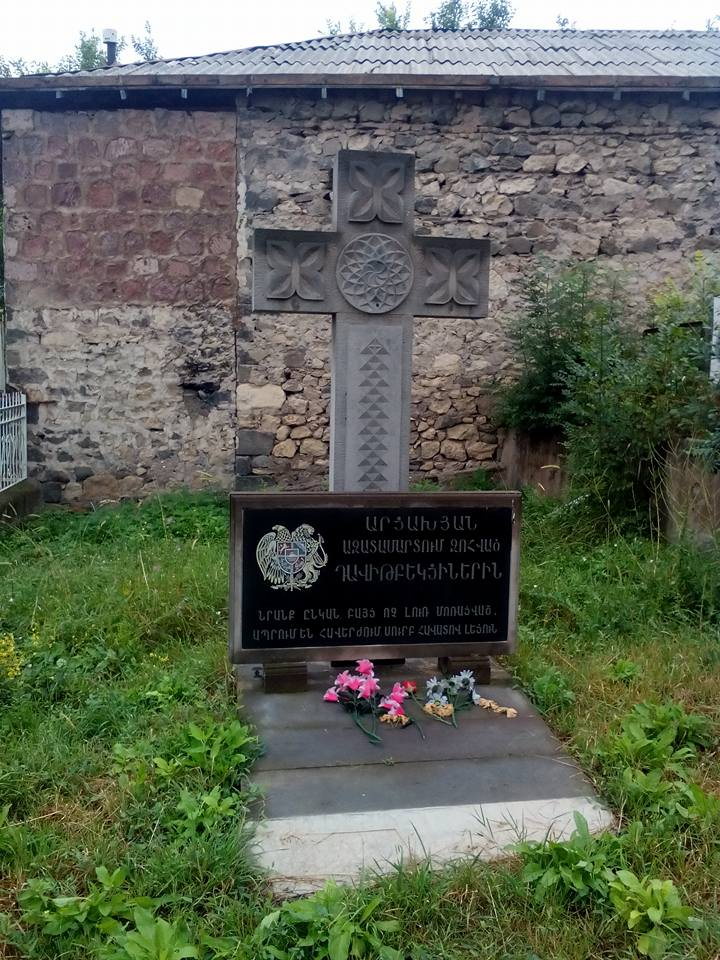
Monument to fallen residents of Davit Bek in the First Nagorno-Karabakh War
