= Mission Party =

Mission Party may refer to:

- Mission Party (Armenia)
- Mission Party (Brazil)
