= Shant Alliance Nationalist Party =

Shant Alliance Nationalist Party Շանթ դաշինք ազգայնական կուսակցություն
- Leader: Shahen Harutyunyan
- Founded: 2021
- Headquarters: Kapan
- Ideology: Tseghakronism; Armenian nationalism Syunik regionalism Revolution of values
- Slogan: 'Together towards a safe, united community'

Website
- Facebook page

The Shant Alliance Nationalist Party, also known as the Shant Alliance (Armenian: Շանթ դաշինք ազգայնական կուսակցություն) is an Armenian political party.

== History ==
The Shant Alliance Nationalist Party was founded in 2021 by Shahen Harutyunyan, the son of Shant Harutyunyan, a Soviet-era political dissident. The party participated in municipal elections in November 2021. The party decided to run only in certain communities within the Syunik Province. The incumbent mayor of Kapan (Syunik's regional capital), Gevorg Parsyan, led the Shant Alliance's electoral list. In the town of Tatev, the party won 6 seats in the municipal council. On 11 November 2021, the Shant Alliance signed a memorandum of cooperation with the Country of Living party. Both parties agreed to form a coalition in order to form a majority in the Tatev city council. Both parties agreed to elect their representative for mayor. Prior to the local elections, the party ruled out forming any alliance with the Civil Contract party.

== Ideology ==
The party supports increasing security and territorial integrity of the Syunik Province, tackling poverty, creating new jobs, supporting educational and social programs, and providing greater support to families.

== See also ==
- Programs of political parties in Armenia
