= Tandzatap =

Tandzatap Տանձատափ
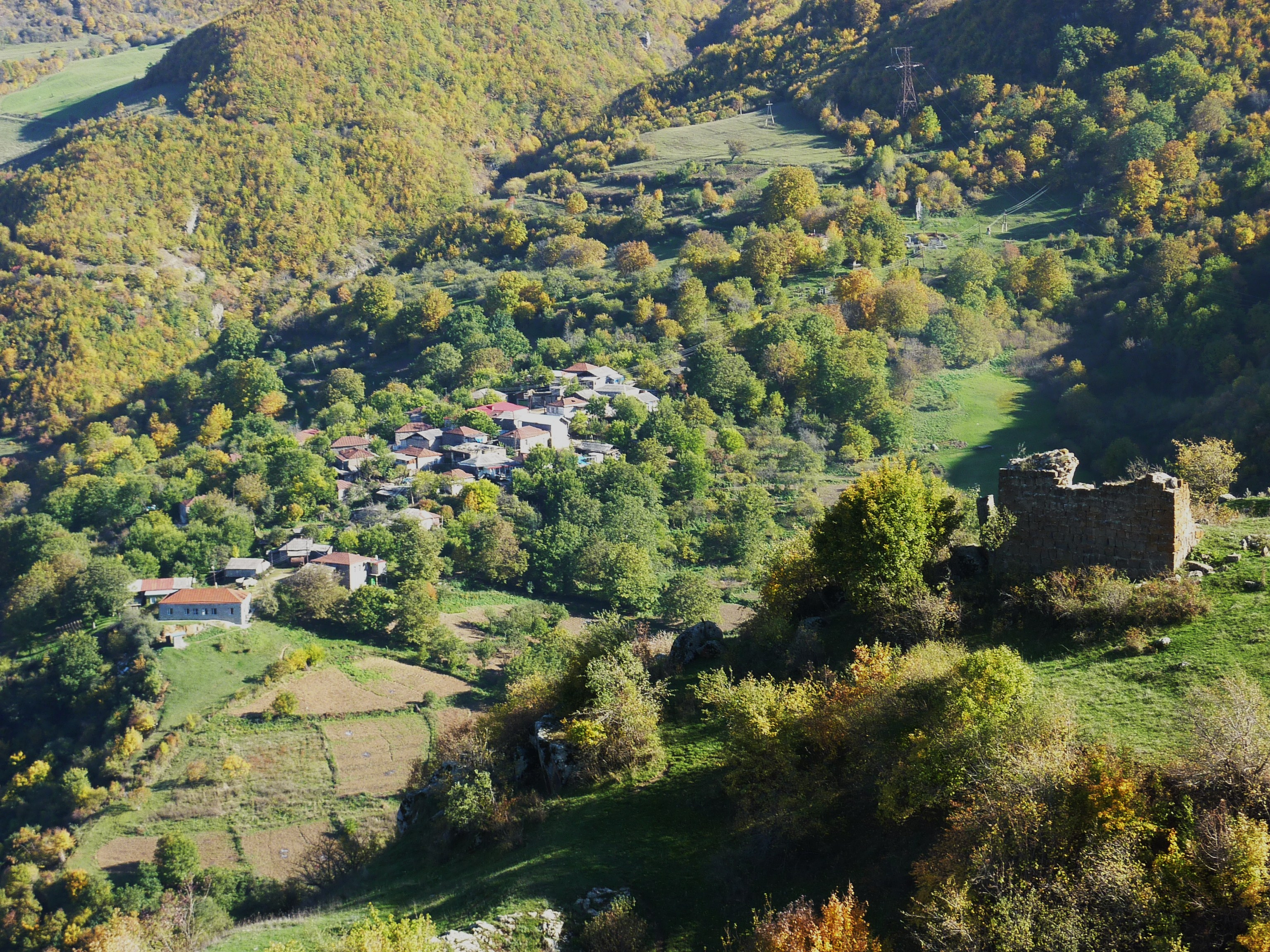

- Location within Armenia Location within Syunik Province
- Coordinates: 39°21′38″N 46°16′17″E
- Country: Armenia
- Province: Syunik
- Municipality: Tatev

Area
  - Total: 7.32 km^{2} (2.83 sq mi)

Population (2011)
  - Total: 88
  - Density: 12/km^{2} (31/sq mi)
- Time zone: UTC+4 (AMT)

Tandzatap (Armenian: Տանձատափ) is a village in the Tatev Municipality of the Syunik Province in Armenia.

== Demographics ==
The Statistical Committee of Armenia reported its population was 100 in 2010, up from 99 at the 2001 census.

== Gallery ==
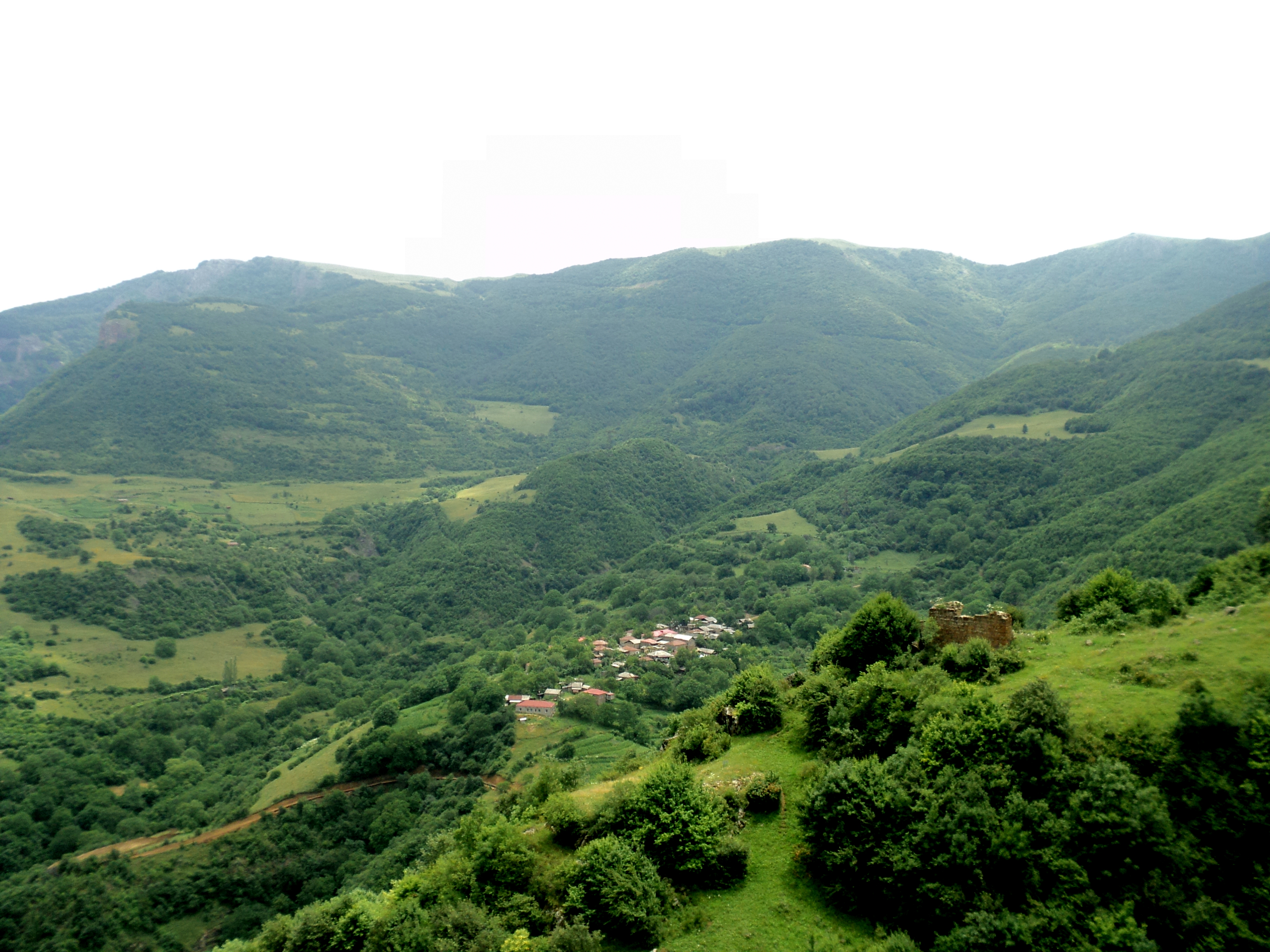
Scenery around the village

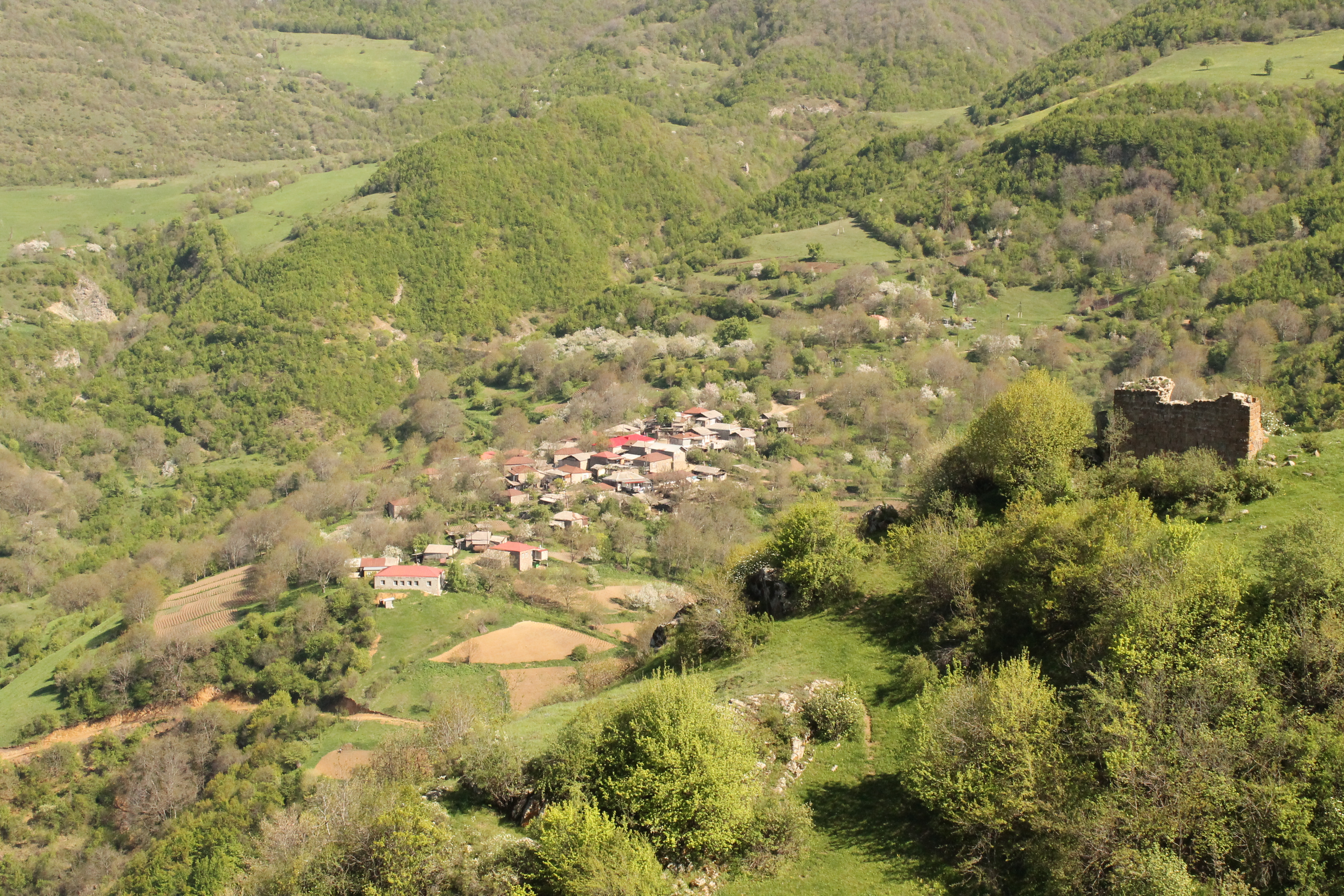
A view of the village
