= Harzhis =

Harzhis Հարժիս
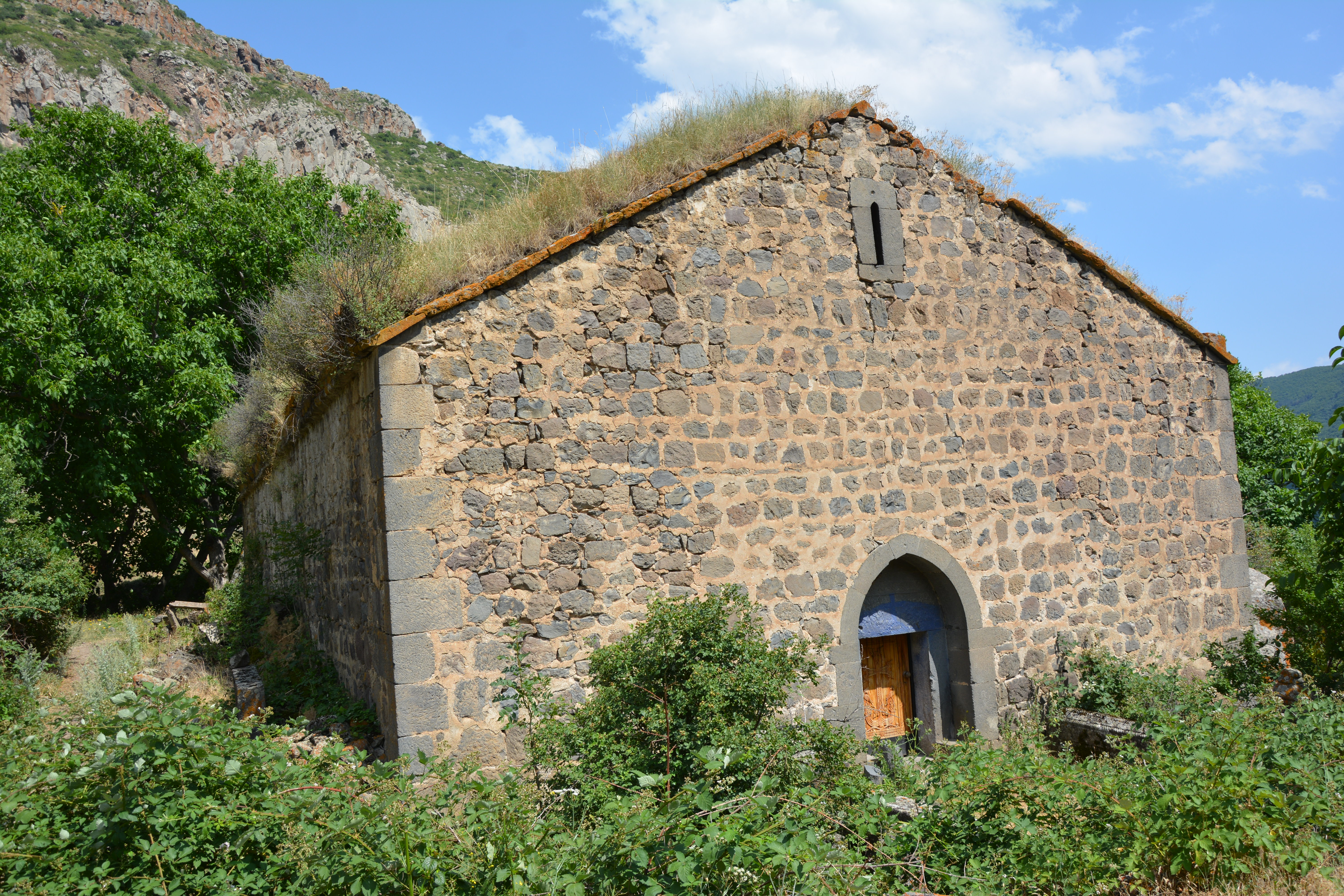
- St. Minas Church in Harzhis

- Location within Armenia Location within Syunik Province
- Coordinates: 39°26′00″N 46°13′18″E
- Country: Armenia
- Province: Syunik
- Municipality: Tatev

Area
  - Total: 33.86 km^{2} (13.07 sq mi)

Population (2011)
  - Total: 879
  - Density: 26.0/km^{2} (67.2/sq mi)
- Time zone: UTC+4 (AMT)

Harzhis (Armenian: Հարժիս) is a village in the Tatev Municipality of the Syunik Province in Armenia.

== Geography ==
The village is located 15 km southwest of the town of Goris, on the left side of the Vorotan River, on the plateau. The distance from Kapan – the center of the province, is about 79 km. The height above sea level is about 17-17,3 km.

== Toponymy ==
Until 1968, the village was known as Yayji/Yaydzhi.

== History ==
The settlement was part of the Zangezur uezd within the Elizavetpol Governorate of the Russian Empire. During the Soviet period, Harzhis was a part of the Goris region of the Armenian SSR. Since 2015, the settlement is a part of the Tatev Municipality.

== Demographics ==
According to the official census in 2011, the population of the village is 879, down from 1,014 in 2010, up from 831 at the 2001 census.

== Gallery ==
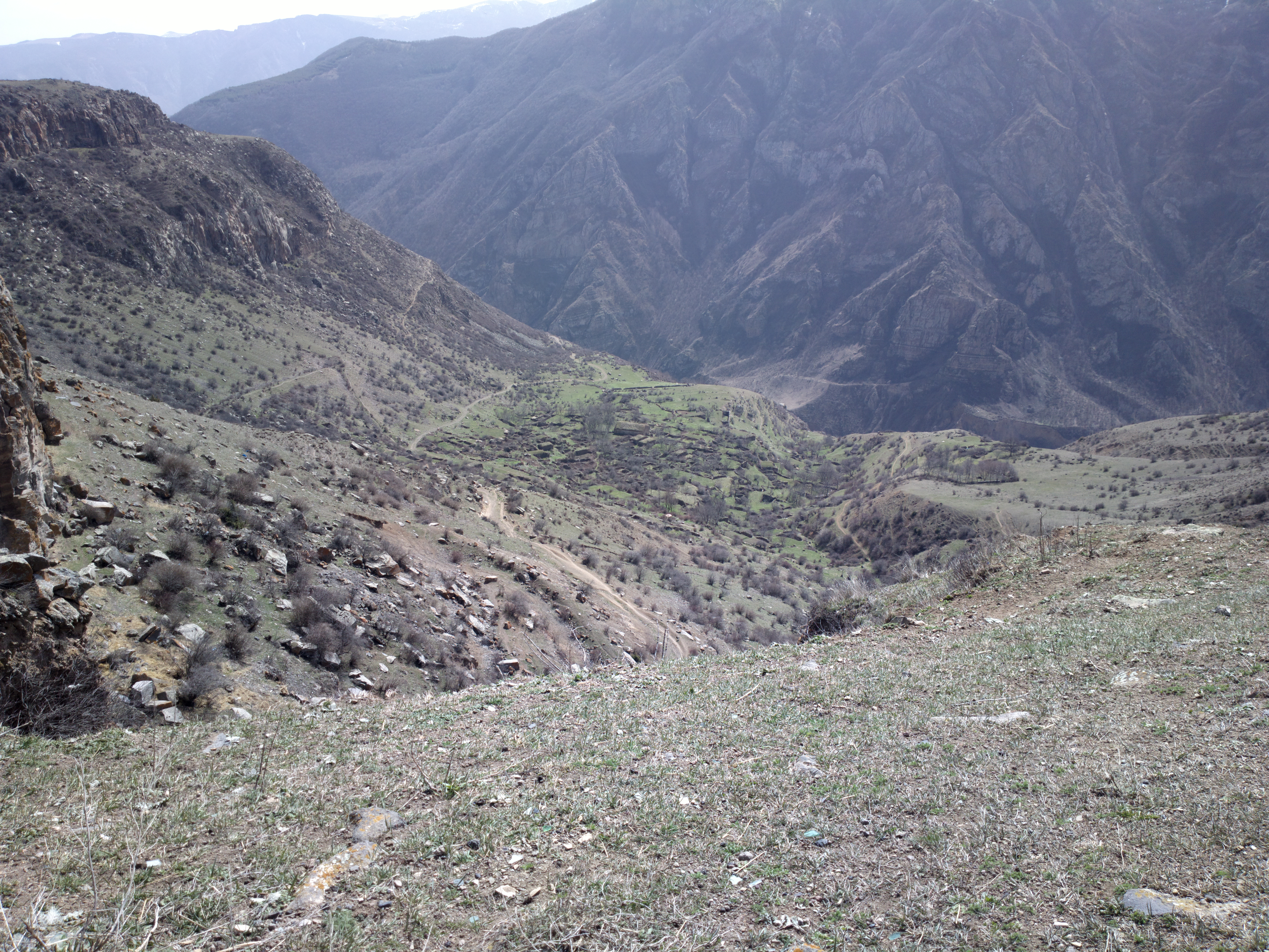
Scenery

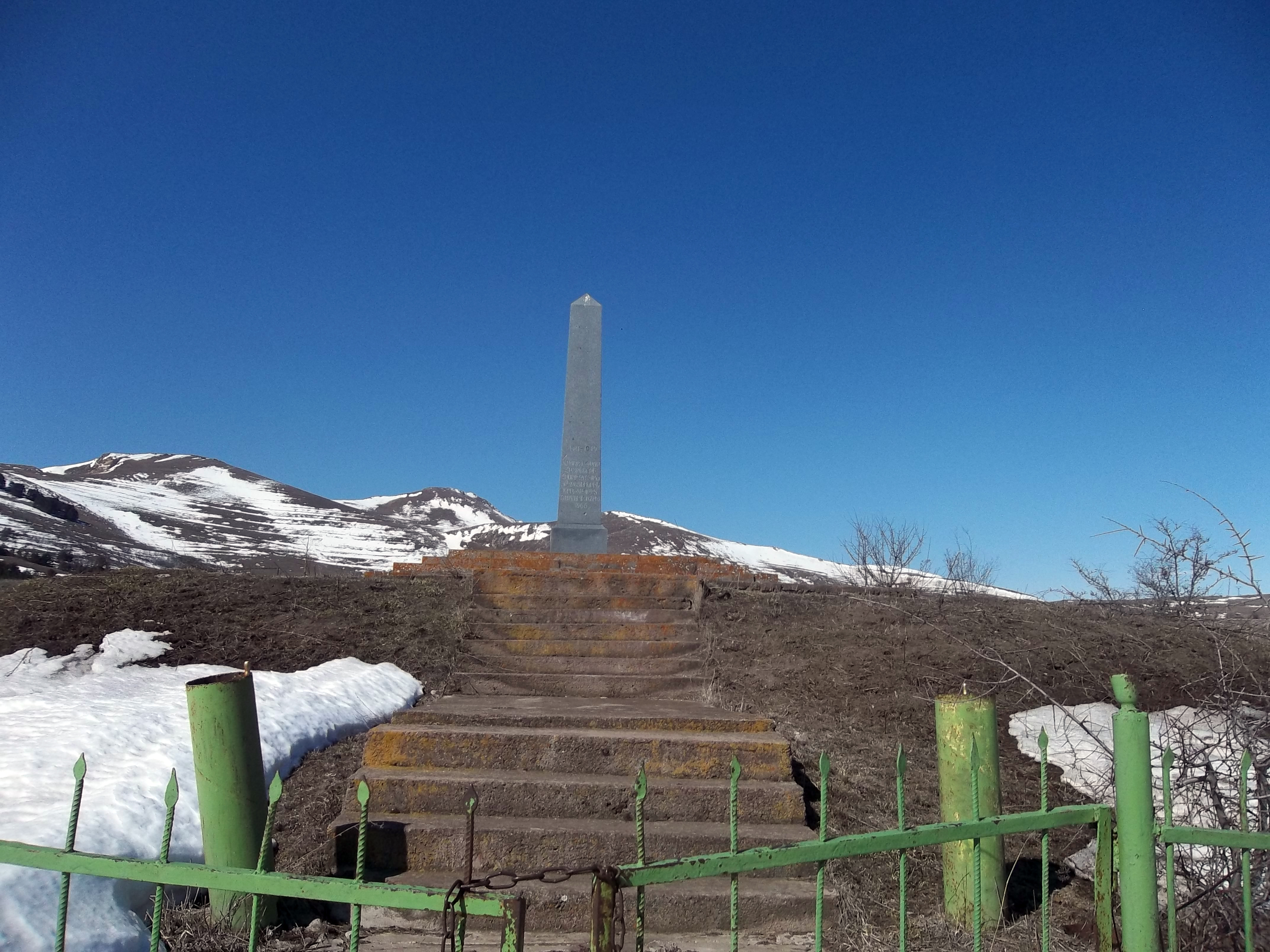
WWII Monument

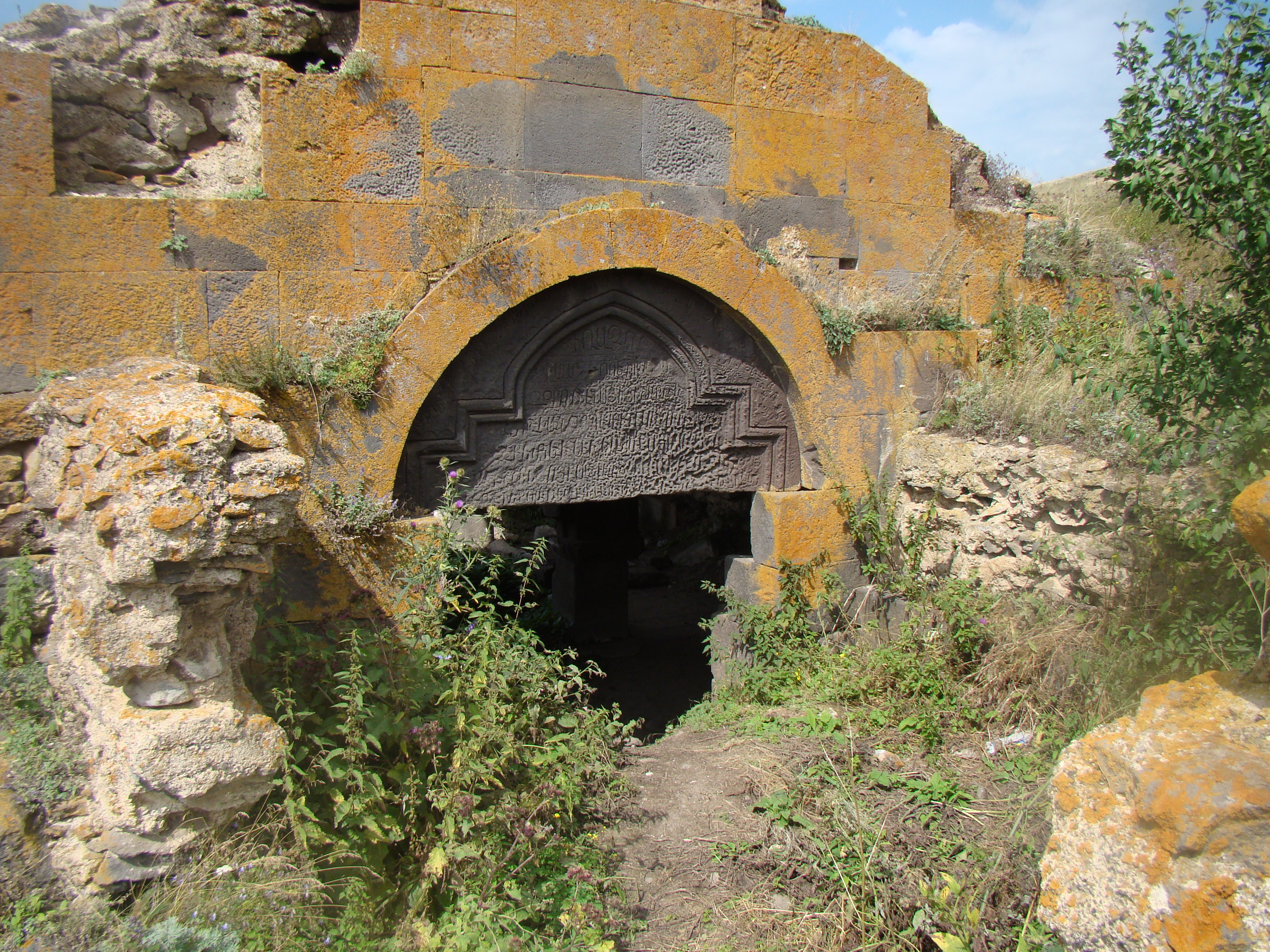
Kotrats caravanserai

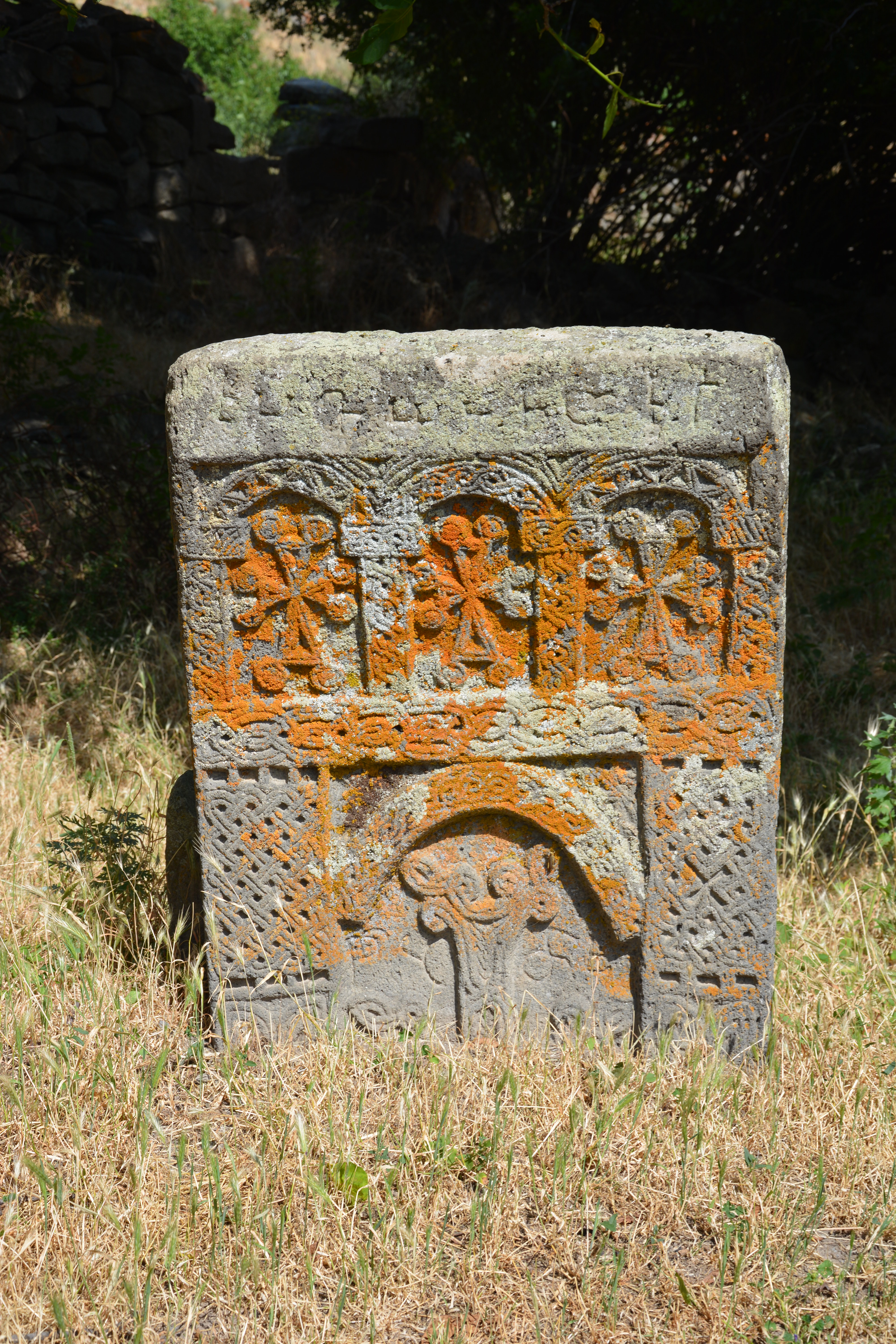
Khatchkar from 1606 in Harzhis

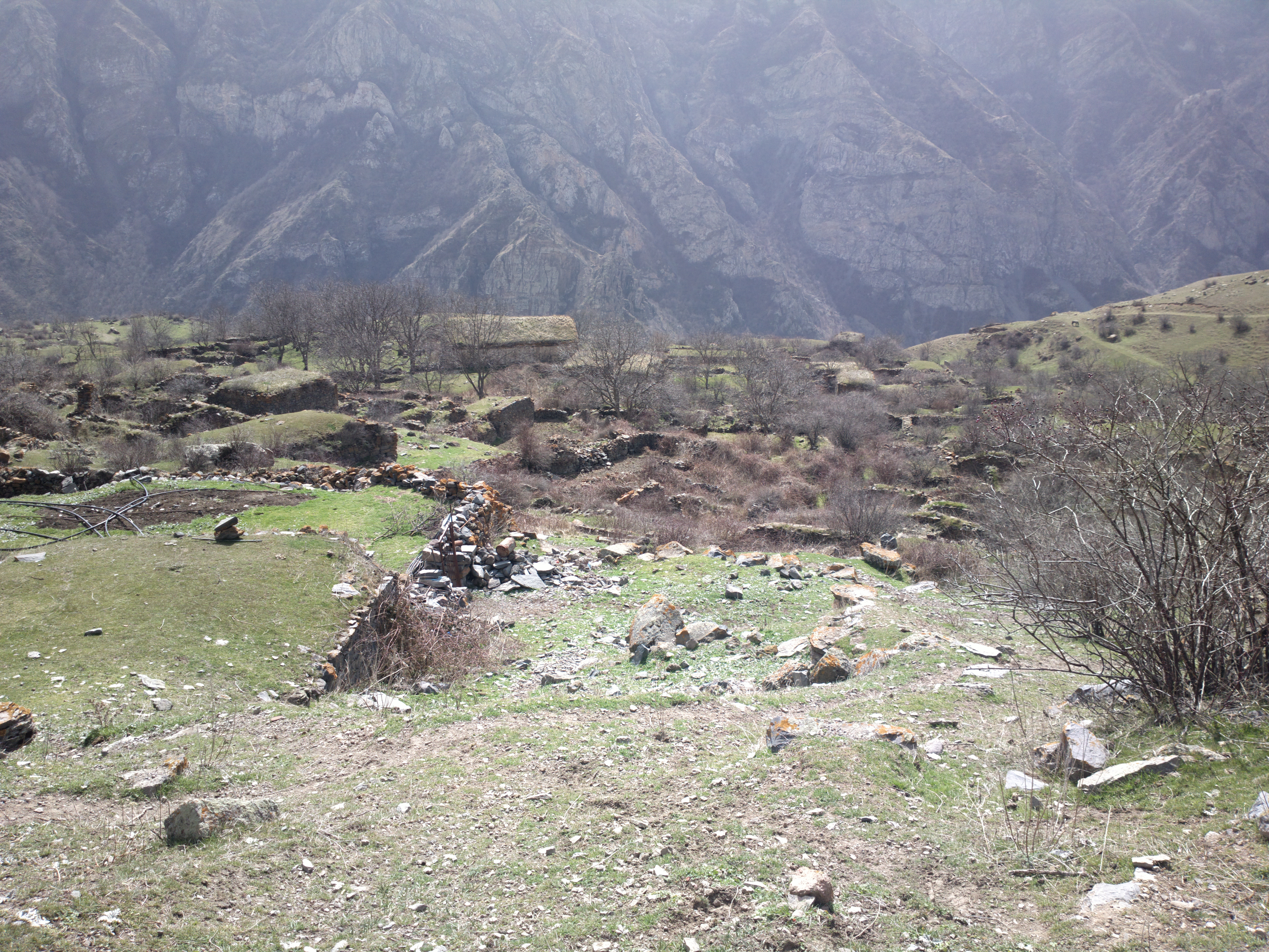
Hin Harzhis

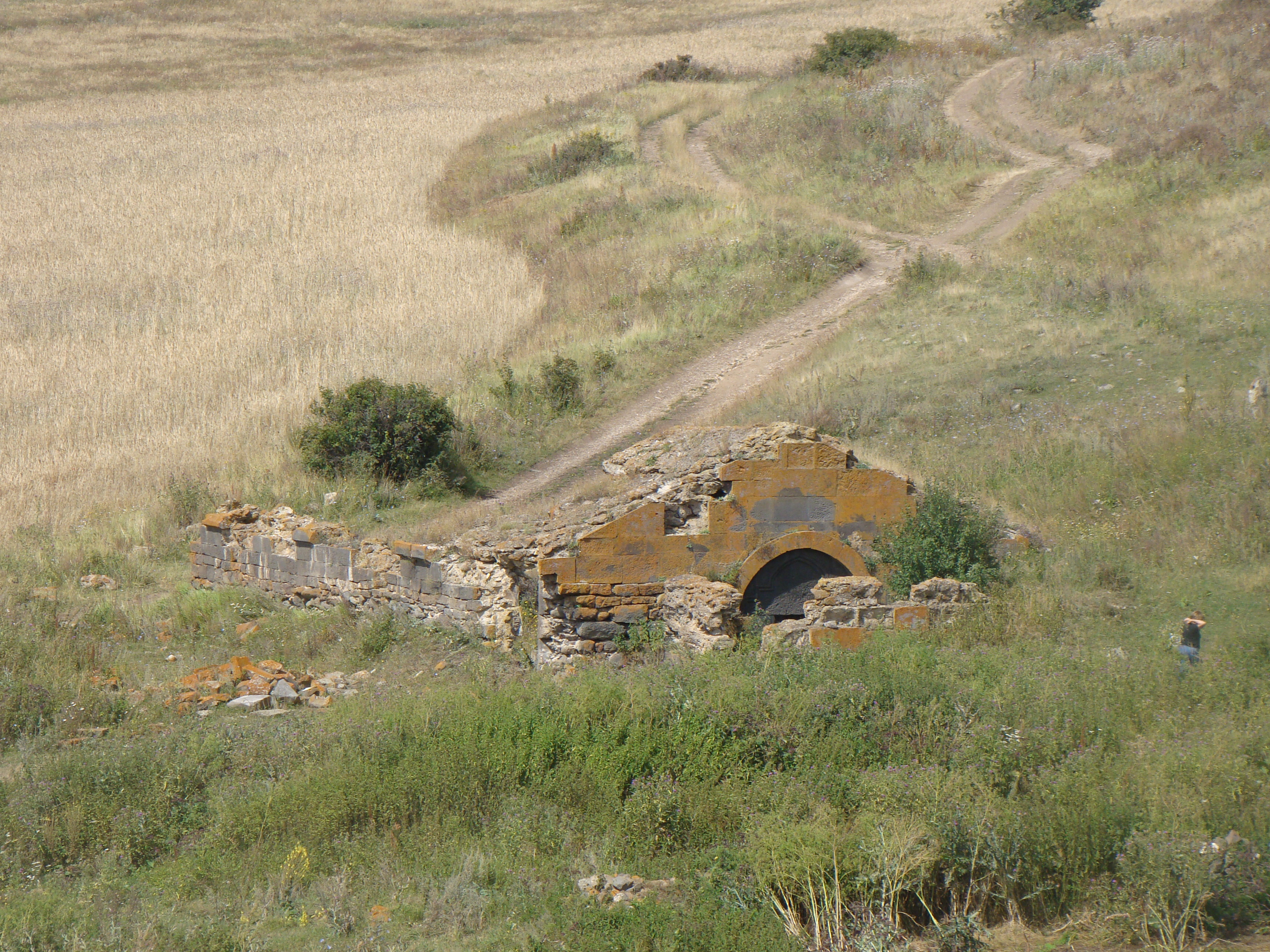
Kotrats caravanserai

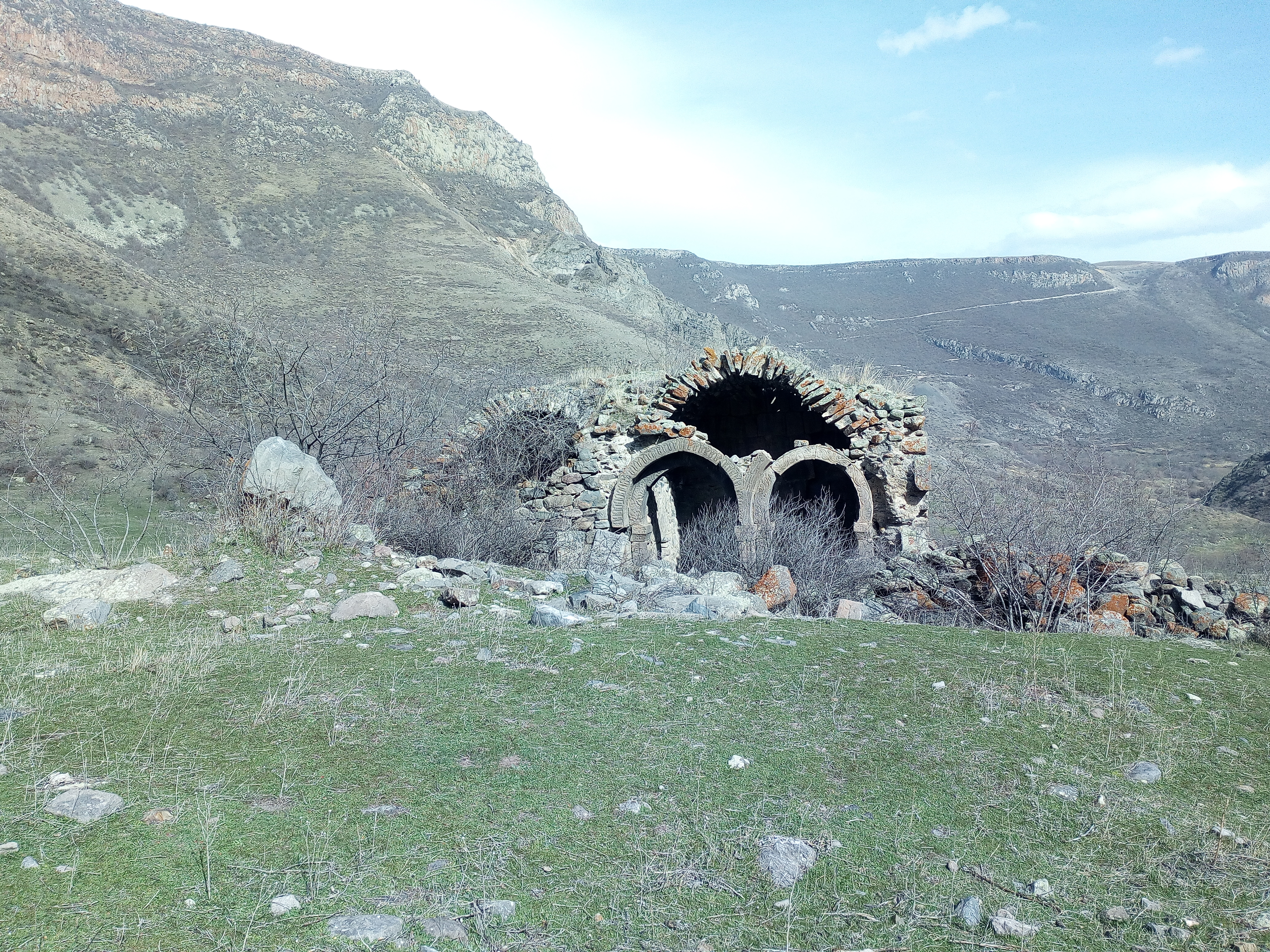
13th-century Alan Tagavor church

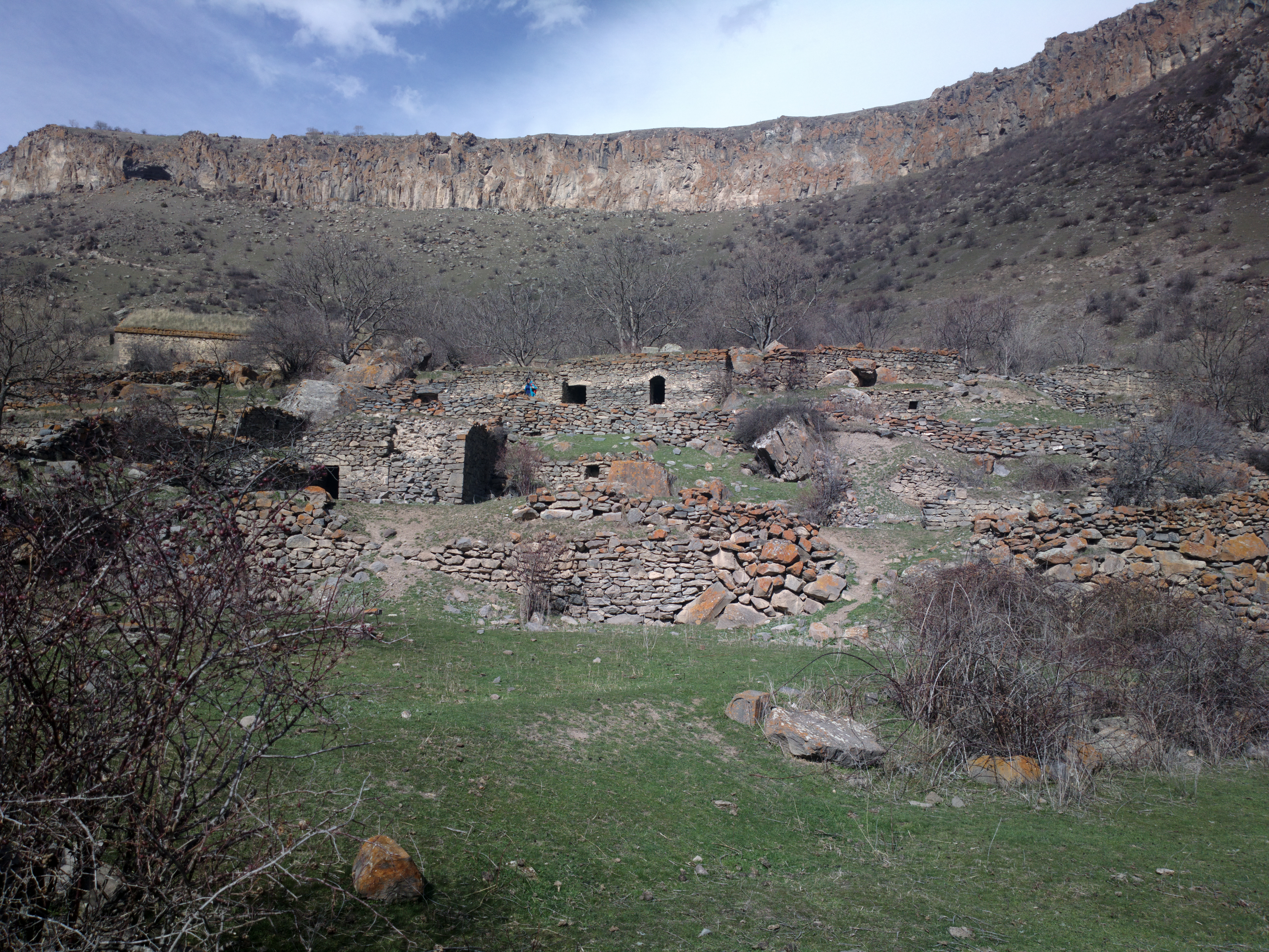
Hin Harzhis
