= Shinuhayr =

Shinuhayr Շինուհայր
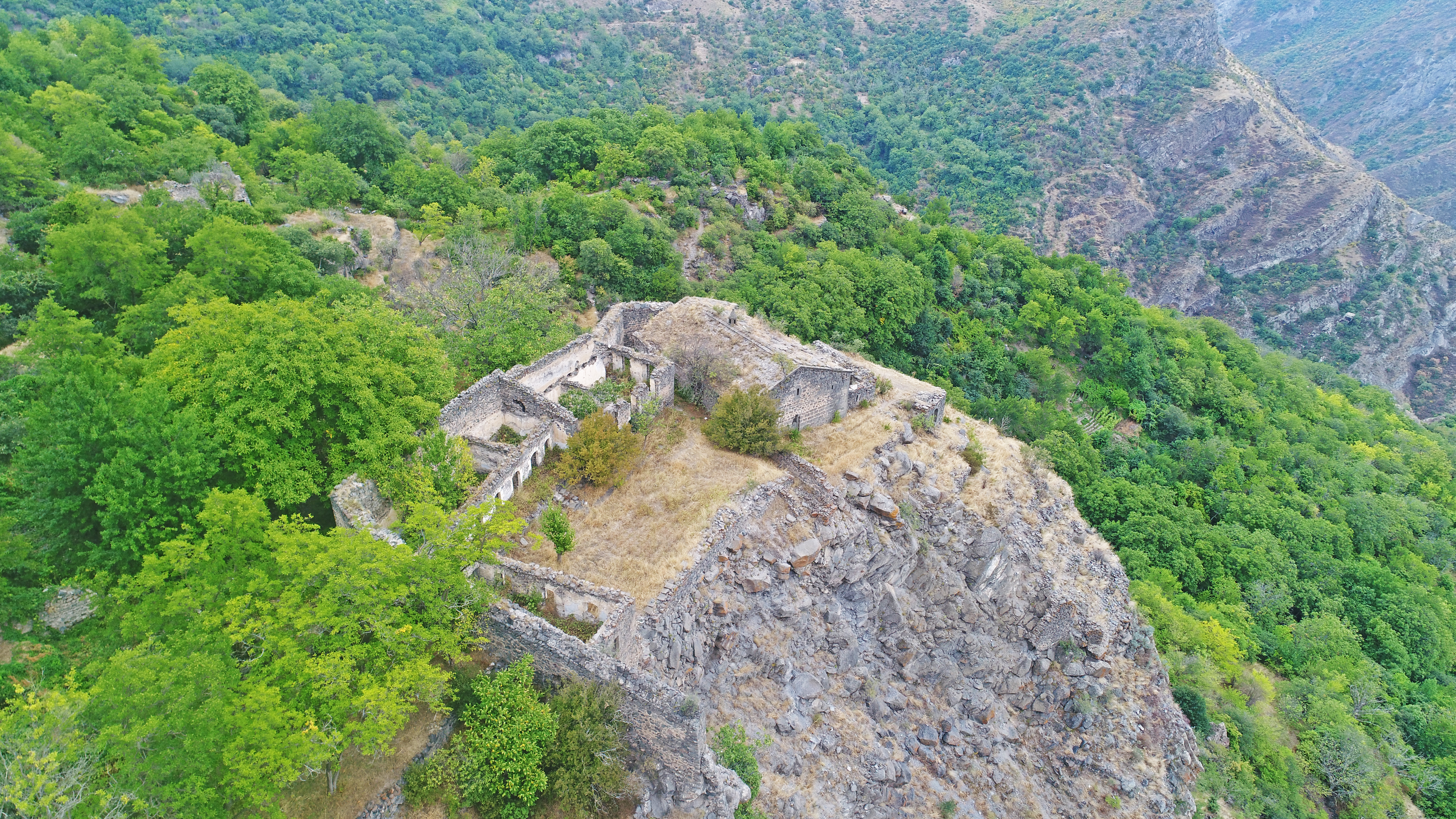
- Medieval monastery Kusanats Anapat in Shinuhayr

- Location within Armenia Location within Syunik Province
- Coordinates: 39°26′03″N 46°18′56″E
- Country: Armenia
- Province: Syunik
- Municipality: Tatev

Area
  - Total: 30.56 km^{2} (11.80 sq mi)

Population (2011)
  - Total: 2,661
  - Density: 87.07/km^{2} (225.5/sq mi)
- Time zone: UTC+4 (AMT)

Shinuhayr (Armenian: Շինուհայր) is a village in the Tatev Municipality of the Syunik Province in Armenia. The village is the largest community and the center of the Tatev Municipality.

== Geography ==
The village is located 9 km south of the town of Goris, on the left bank of the Vorotan River, on the plateau, about 1,5 km above sea level. The distance from the province center of Kapan is about 68 km.

== History ==
Shinuhayr is first mentioned in written sources in the beginning of the 10th century. In Stepanos Orbelian's History of the Province of Syunik the tax of the village is set at 24, which proves that Shinuhayr was one of the largest villages not only of Haband province, but also of Syunik as a whole. Perhaps with this in mind, some authors later used the forms of Shinu hayr or Hayrashen, that is, 'the father of villages'. However, Orbelian uses only two forms: Shnher and Shinoi Herk. The form Shner is used also in historical inscriptions.

Shnher first belonged to Prince Filipe of Syunik, who then donated it to Tatev Monastery, which was re-established by Prince Tarsayich Orbelian in 1274. The village remained the property of the monastery until the beginning of the 19th century.

During the Syunik rebellion in the 1720s, the Armenian military leader Davit Bek made Shinuhayr his first base of operations and began repairing the settlement's fortress.

The village under the name of Shinher was included in the Zangezur uezd within the Elizavetpol Governorate of Russian Empire. During the Soviet period, the village was part of the Zangezur province of the Armenian SSR, and from 1930, it was part of the Goris region.

== Demographics ==
The Statistical Committee of Armenia reported its population was 2,865 in 2010, up from 2,593 at the 2001 census.

== Economy and culture ==
The population is engaged in vegetable farming, cultivation of grain and fodder crops. The currently inoperative Goris Airport, also known as Shinuhayr Airport, is located in the village.

== Notable people ==
- Suren Tovmasyan (1910–1980), Soviet Armenian politician and diplomat

== Gallery ==
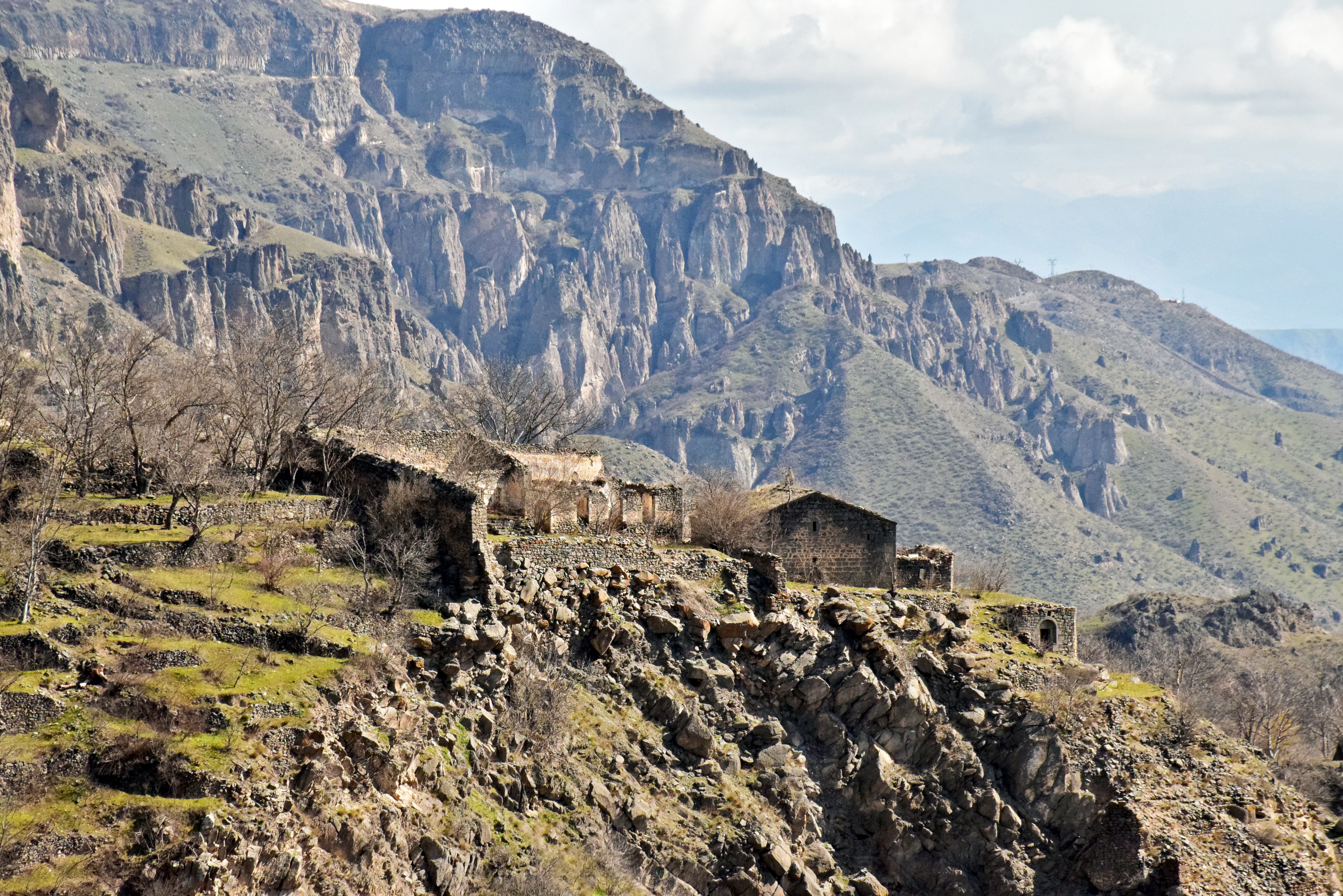
Kusanats Anapat

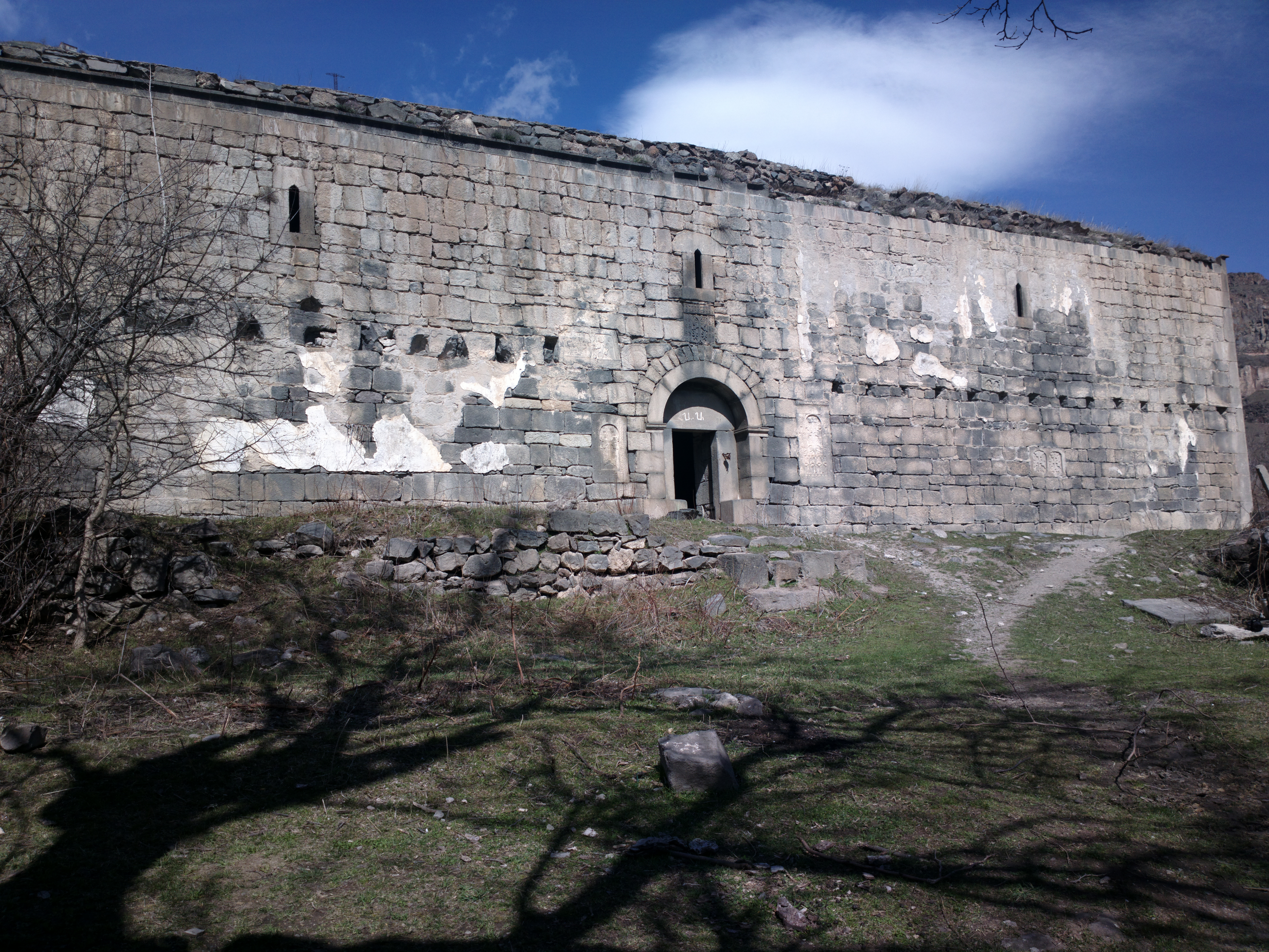
Saint Stepanos church in Hin Shinuhayr

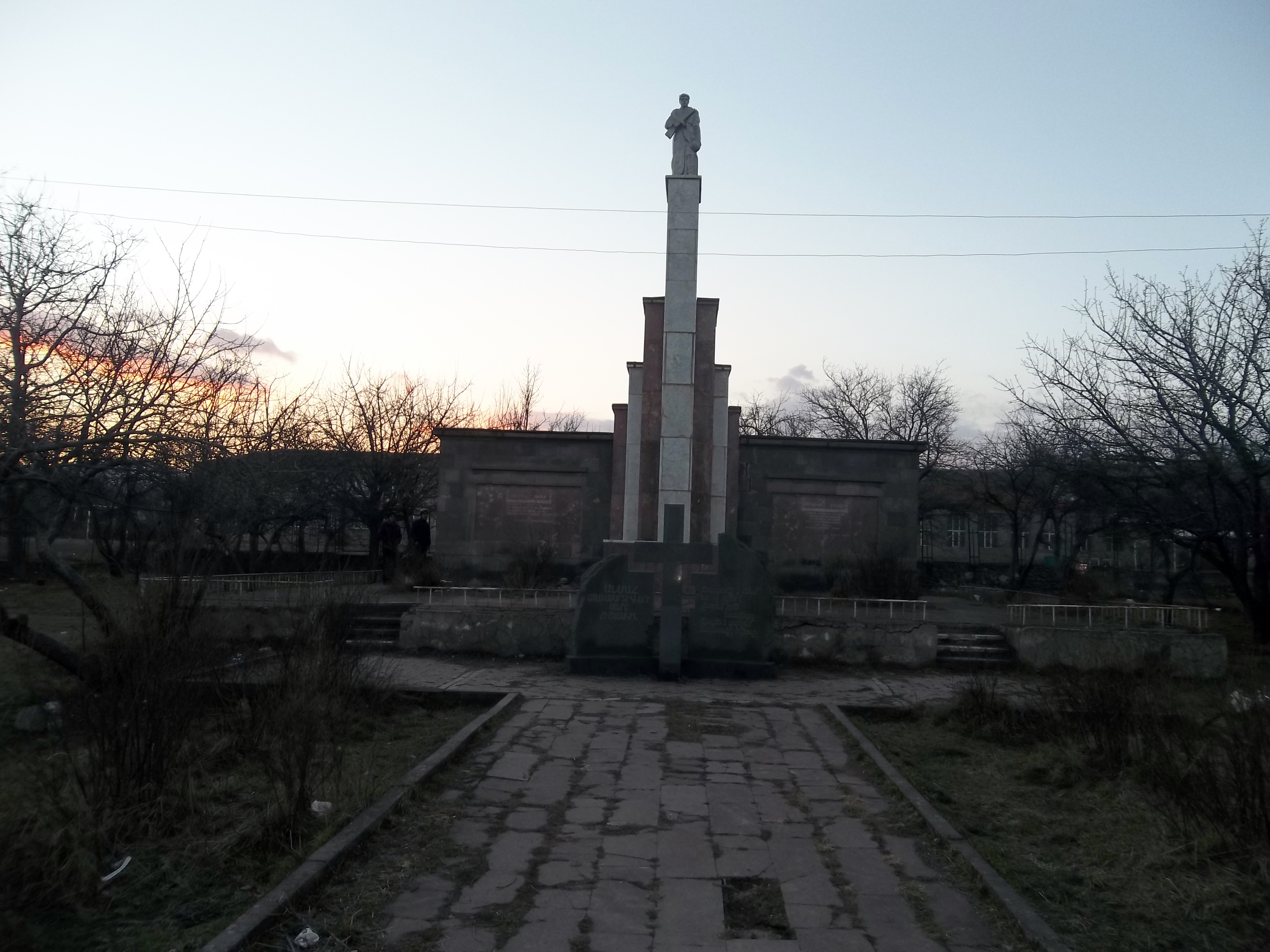
WWII monument

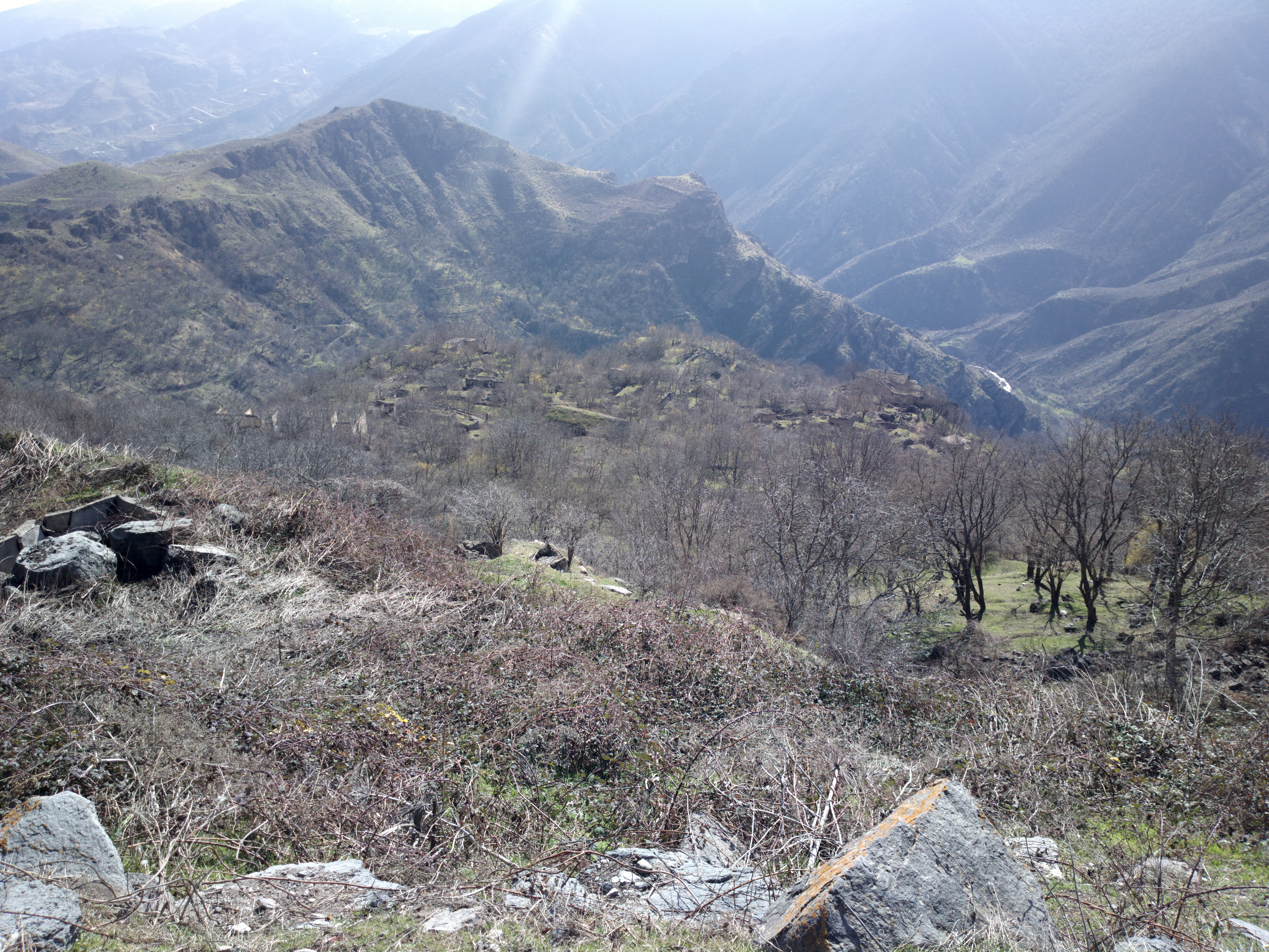
Hin Shinuhayr

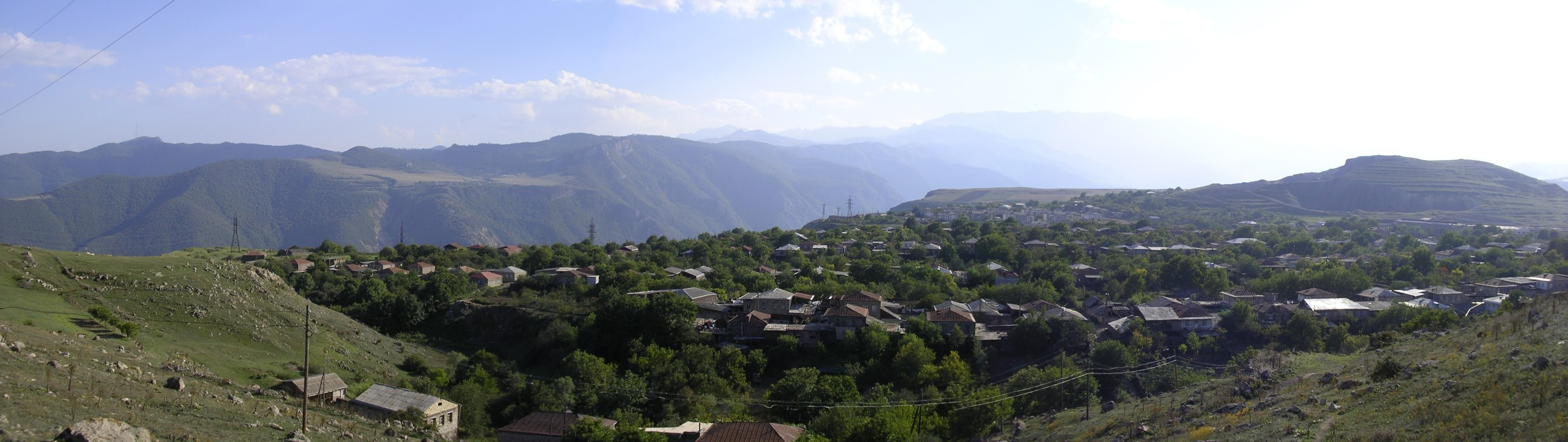
Panorama from Shinuhayr village and Vorotan canyon

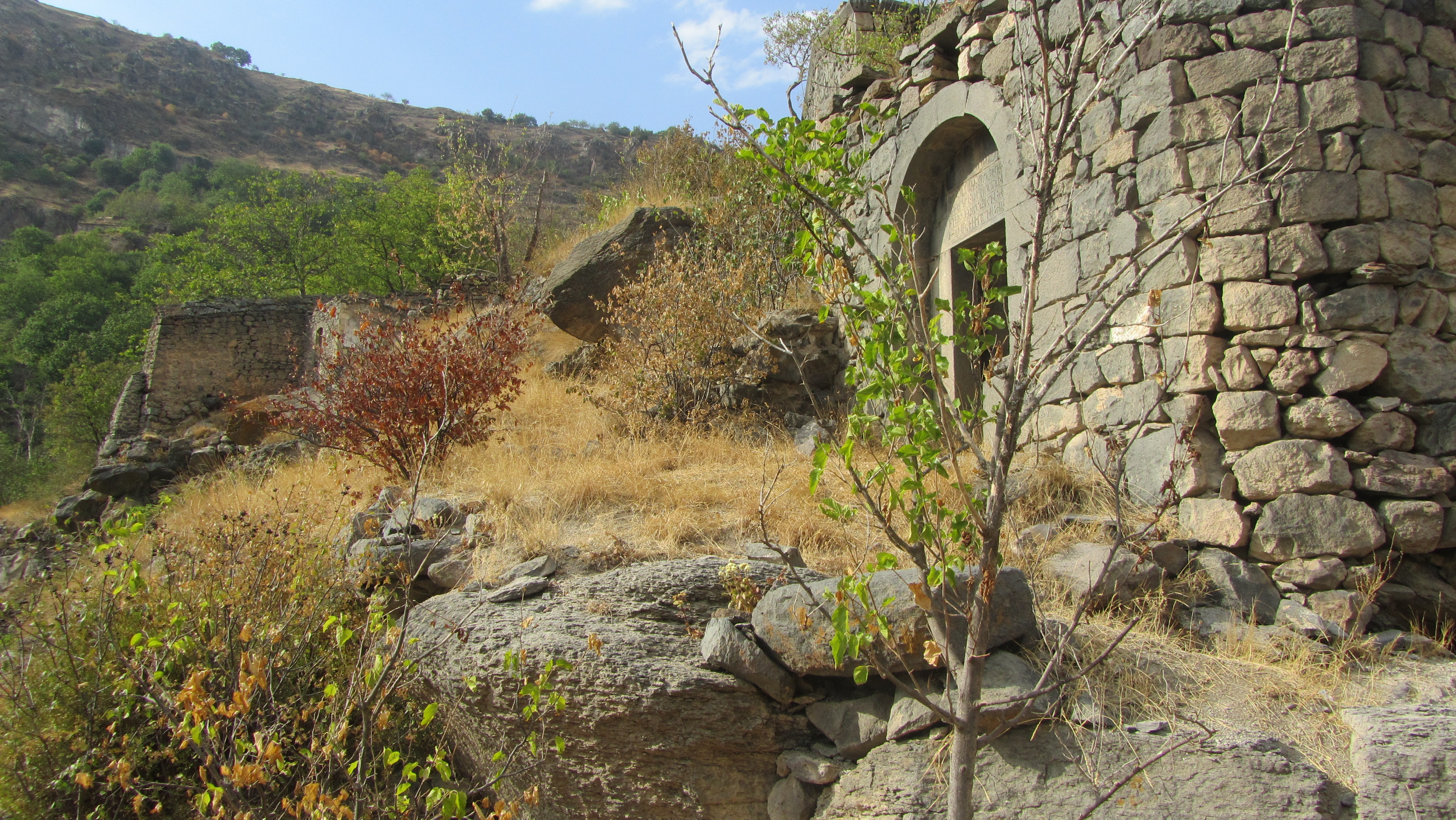
The entrance to the monastery
