= Kashuni, Armenia =

Kashuni Քաշունի
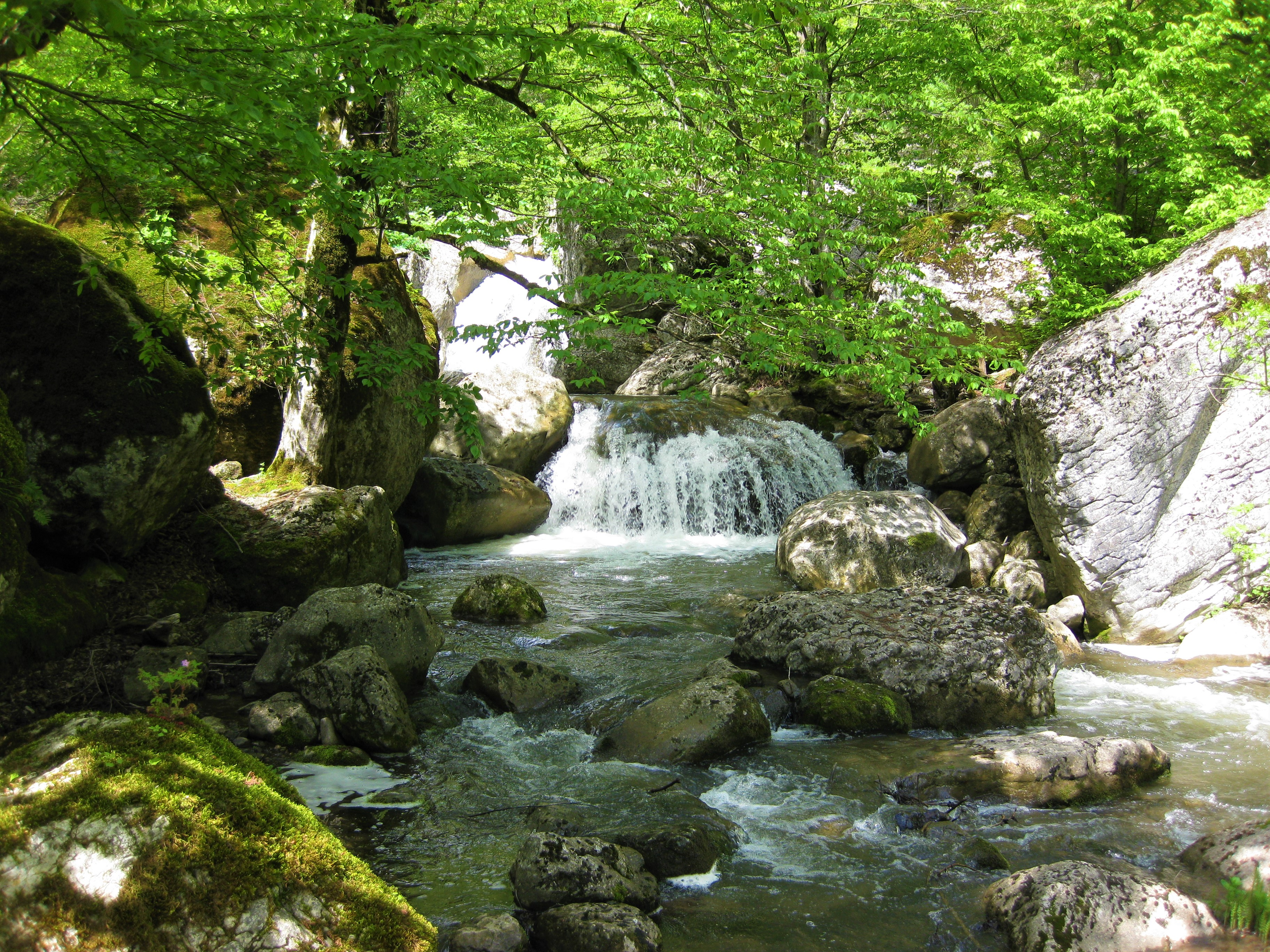
- Kashuni river

- Location within Armenia Location within Syunik Province
- Coordinates: 39°20′49″N 46°16′30″E
- Country: Armenia
- Province: Syunik
- Municipality: Tatev

Area
  - Total: 7.15 km^{2} (2.76 sq mi)

Population (2011)
  - Total: 11
  - Density: 1.5/km^{2} (4.0/sq mi)
- Time zone: UTC+4 (AMT)

Kashuni (Armenian: Քաշունի) is a village in the Tatev Municipality of the Syunik Province in Armenia.

== Toponymy ==
The village was previously known as Maldash.

== Demographics ==
In the 2011 census, the reported population was 11, reduced from the 27 reported at the 2001 census.
