= Country of Living =

Country of Living Ապրելու երկիր կուսակցության
- Leader: Mane Tandilyan
- Founded: August 15, 2021
- Preceded by: Mission Party
- Headquarters: Yerevan
- Political position: Centre

Country of Living (Armenian: Ապրելու երկիր կուսակցության, romanized: Aprelu yerkir kusakts’ut’yan), also known as Country to Live, Living Country or Land of Living, is an Armenian political party. It was founded in 2021 and is currently led by Mane Tandilyan.

== History ==
The party held its founding congress on 15 August 2021, the founders of the party are Mesrop Arakelyan and Mane Tandilyan. Mane Tandilyan, a previous member of Bright Armenia, was unanimously elected Chairwoman. Meanwhile, Mesrop Arakelyan of the Mission Party announced that he was merging the Mission Party with the Country of Living party. Tandilyan and Arakelyan both formerly served as Minister of Labor and Social Affairs under Nikol Pashinyan.

The party does not have any representation in the National Assembly and currently acts as an extra-parliamentary force.

The party participated in municipal elections across Armenia in November 2021, winning seats in the communities of Tegh, Dilijan, Tatev, Meghri and in Gyumri. In Tatev, the party formed a political alliance with the Shant Alliance in order to form a majority in the Tatev city council.

The party participated in the 2023 Yerevan City Council elections, nominating Mane Tandilyan as candidate for Mayor of Yerevan. Following the elections, the party failed to win any seats in the Yerevan City Council, winning just 3.64% of the vote.

== Ideology ==
The party manifesto states, "The party will unite all possible individuals and forces for the sake of the Armenian people and of Armenia and will ensure long-term security, effective foreign policy and cooperation with the Armenian diaspora, development and quality education, ensuring individual health and welfare, population growth, creation of a new public administration system, maintenance of the rule of law and independent judiciary system, the preservation of national-cultural values, and support Artsakh's independence."

== See also ==
- Programs of political parties in Armenia
