= Aramazd Stepanian =

- Born: October 11, 1951 (age 74); Abadan, Iran

Aramazd Stepanian (Armenian: Արամազդ Ստեփանեան, born October 11, 1951) is an Armenian actor, producer, director and playwright born in Abadan, Iran. He is the owner of the Luna Playhouse where he also serves as the artistic director and producer. He was also a former candidate for Glendale, California City Council.
