= Mission Party (Armenia) =

Armenian political party

Mission Party Առաքելություն կուսակցություն
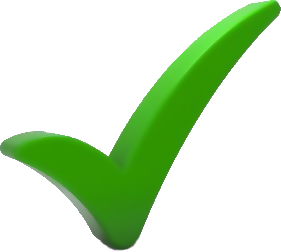
- Leader: Manuk Sukiasyan
- Founded: February 2, 2013
- Dissolved: August 2021
- Succeeded by: Country of Living
- Headquarters: Yerevan
- Ideology: Liberalism
- Political position: Centre
- National affiliation: My Step Alliance (2018–2021); Tsarukyan Alliance (2017–2018)

The Mission Party (Armenian: Առաքելություն կուսակցություն, romanized: Arrak’elut’yun kusakts’ut’yun) was an Armenian political party founded on 2 February 2013. In August 2021, the party announced its decision to merge with the Country of Living Party.

== History ==
Its debut was at the 2013 Yerevan City Council election, where the party came in last place with less than 1% of the vote.

In the 2017 Armenian parliamentary election, the party participated as part of the Tsarukyan Alliance. The alliance won 31 seats in the National Assembly.

In the 2018 Yerevan City Council elections, the party joined Civil Contract and formed the My Step Alliance, which won the elections, and their candidate Hayk Marutyan became the Mayor of Yerevan. The My Step Alliance took part in the 2018 Armenian parliamentary elections and won a supermajority of seats within the National Assembly.

Prior to the 2021 Armenian parliamentary elections, Civil Contract announced that they would be participating in the elections independently, effectively dissolving the My Step Alliance. Meanwhile, the Mission Party did not register to participate in the 2021 elections. In August 2021, the party merged with the Country of Living Party.

== Ideology ==
During the party formation, leaders made clear that the party would not be explicitly Pro-Russian or Pro-Western but rather the party will focus on advocating the values of freedom and democracy in Armenia.

== Electoral record ==
=== Parliamentary elections ===
| Election | Alliance | Votes | % | Seats | Position | Government |
|---|---|---|---|---|---|---|
| 2017 | part of Tsarukyan Alliance | 428,836 | 27.36 | 31 / 105 | 2nd | Opposition (2017–2018) |
| 2017 | part of Tsarukyan Alliance | 428,836 | 27.36 | 31 / 105 | 2nd | Government (2018) |
| 2017 | part of Tsarukyan Alliance | 428,836 | 27.36 | 31 / 105 | 2nd | Opposition (2018–2019) |
| 2018 | part of My Step Alliance | 884,456 | 70.43 | 88 / 132 | ▲1st | Government |

=== Local elections ===
==== Yerevan City Council elections ====
| Election | Alliance | Mayor candidate | Votes | % | Seats in City Council | Position |
|---|---|---|---|---|---|---|
| 2013 | none | Manuk Sukiasyan | 2,692 | 0.64 | 0 / 65 | 7th |
| 2017 | did not participate | | | | | |
| 2018 | part of My Step Alliance | Hayk Marutyan | 294,092 | 81.06 | 57 / 65 | ▲1st |

== See also ==
- Programs of political parties in Armenia
