= Tatev (village) =

Tatev Տաթև
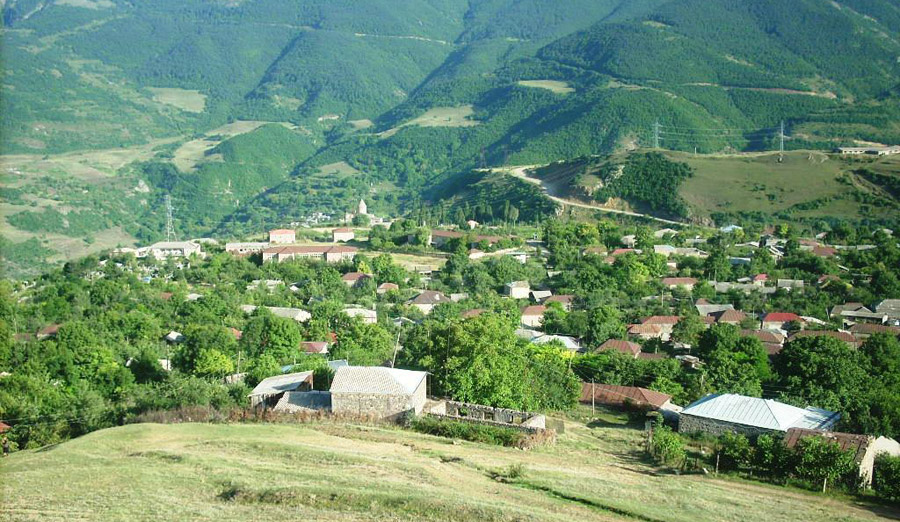

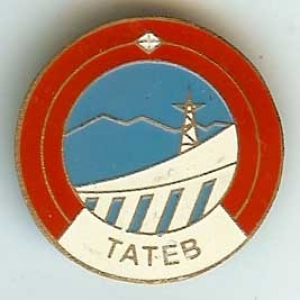
- Coat of arms

- Location within Armenia Location within Syunik Province
- Coordinates: 39°22′54″N 46°14′24″E
- Country: Armenia
- Province: Syunik
- Municipality: Tatev

Area
  - Total: 65.73 km^{2} (25.38 sq mi)

Population (2011)
  - Total: 864
  - Density: 13.1/km^{2} (34.0/sq mi)
- Time zone: UTC+4 (AMT)

Tatev (Armenian: Տաթև) is a village and the center of the Tatev Municipality of the Syunik Province in Armenia. The village is home to the 9th-century Tatev Monastery, and hosts a station of the Wings of Tatev; the world's longest non-stop double track aerial tramway.

== Demographics ==
The Statistical Committee of Armenia reported its population was 892 in 2010, down from 1,042 at the 2001 census.

== Gallery ==
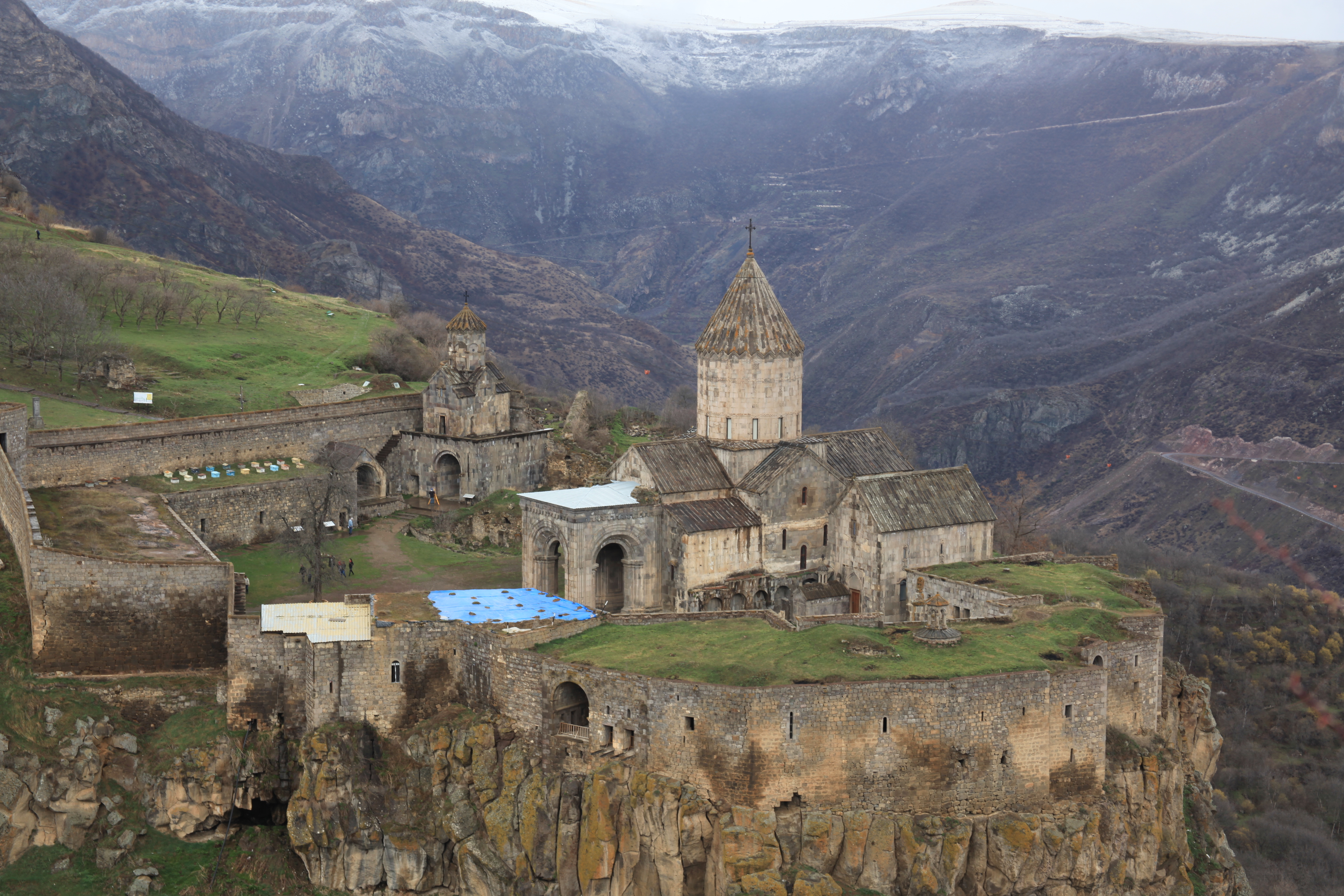
Tatev monastery

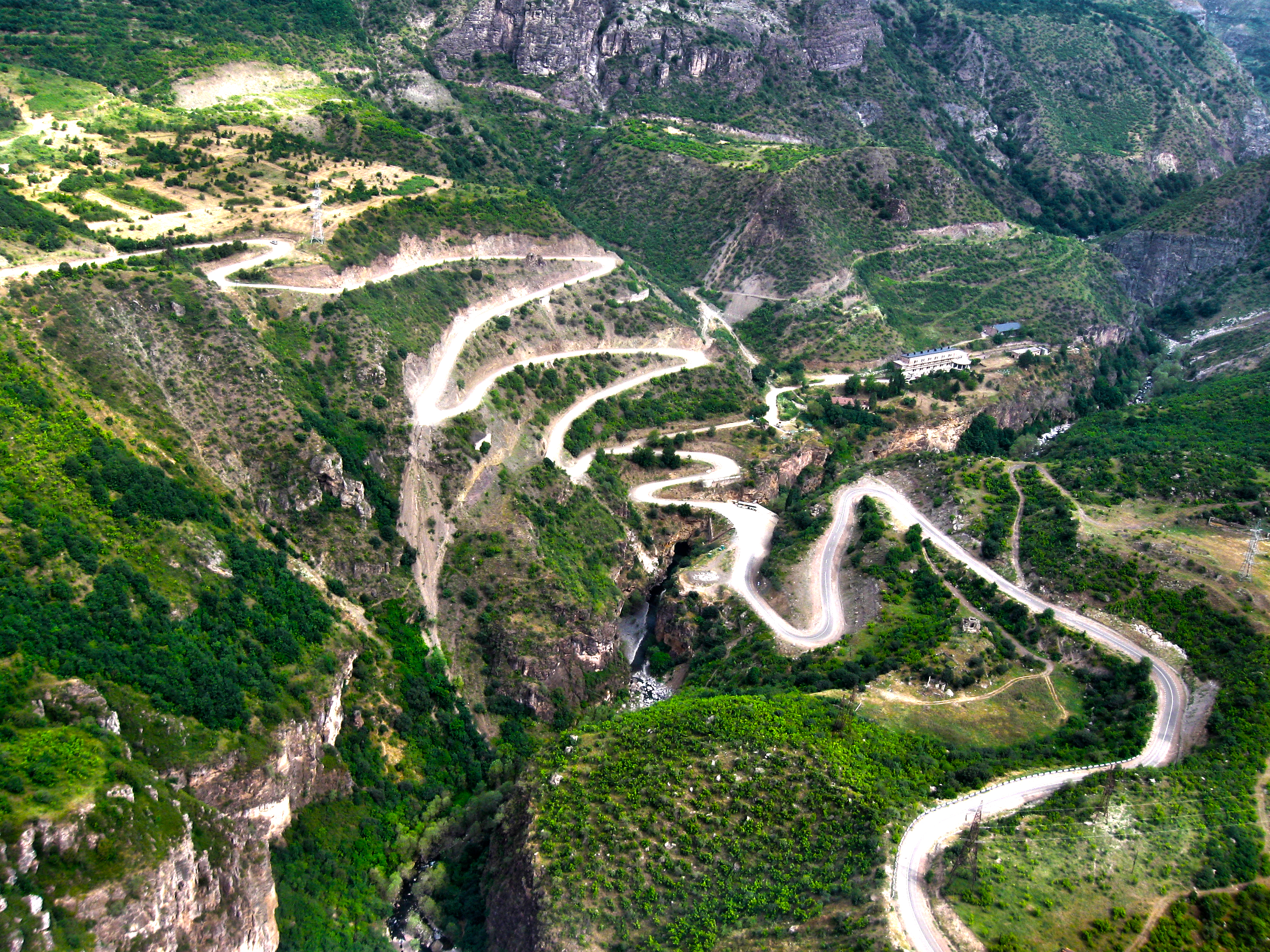
"Satan's bridge" in Tatev

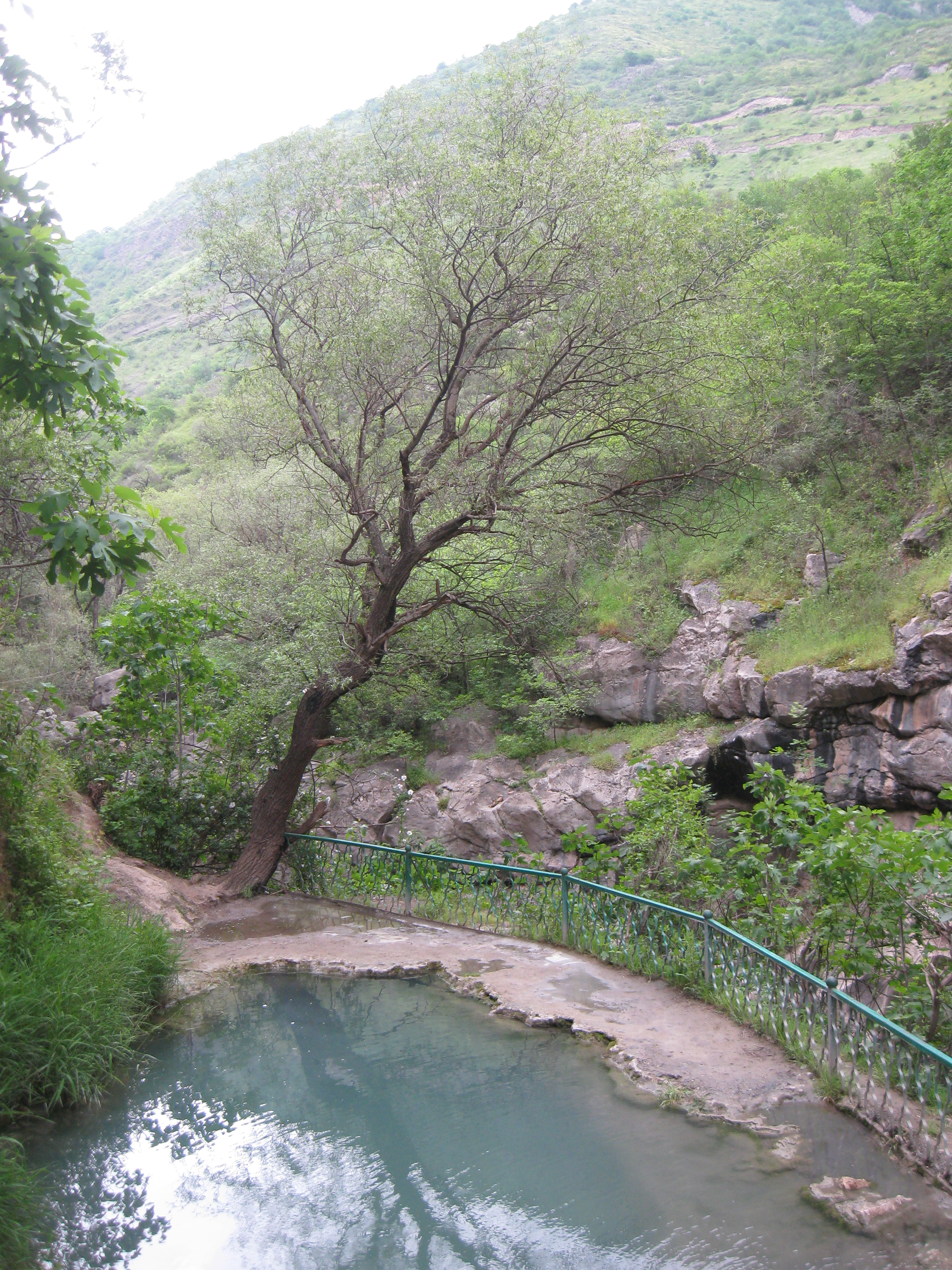
Thermal lake near "Satan's bridge"

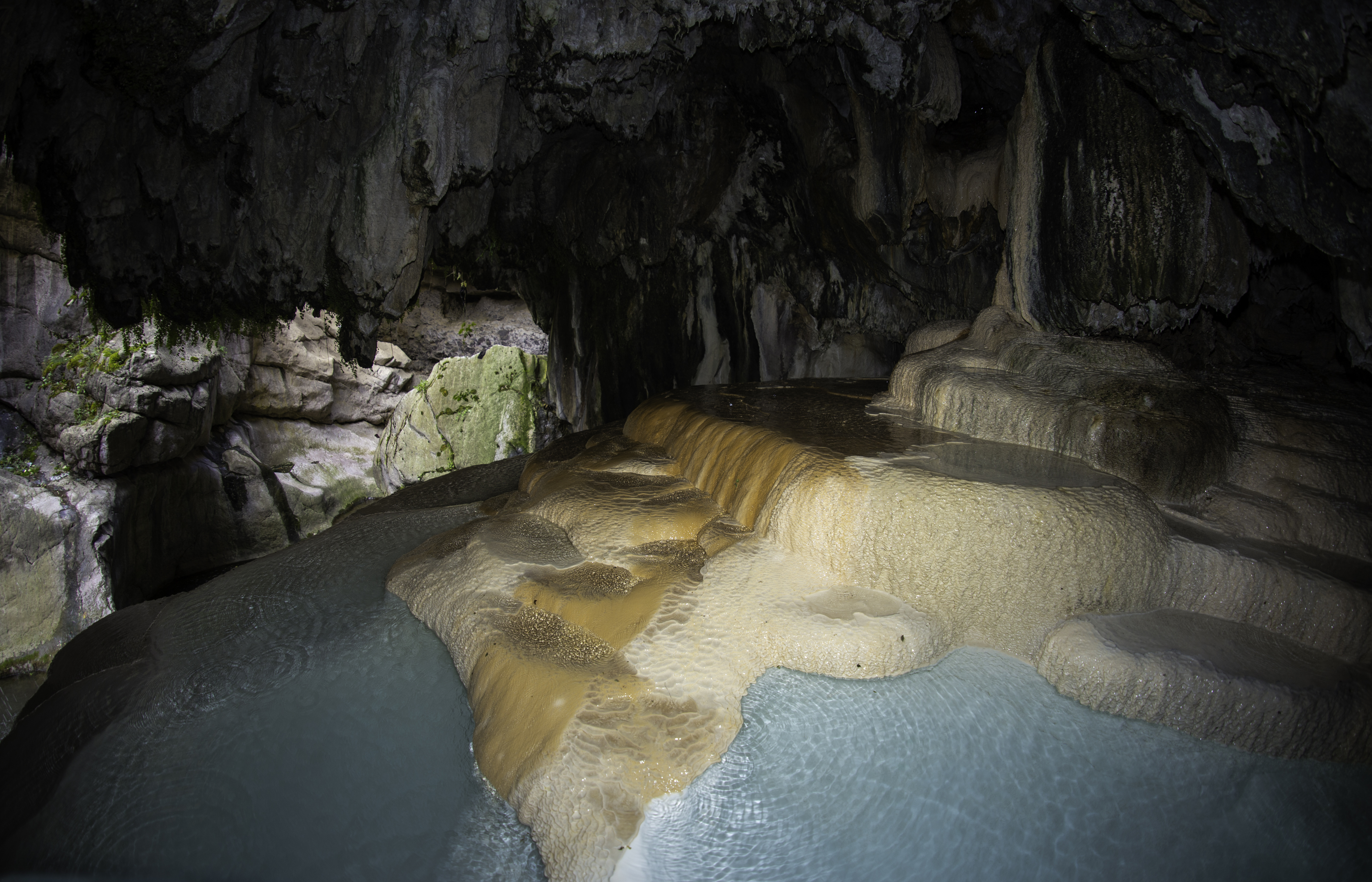
Mineral pools beneath "Satan's bridge"

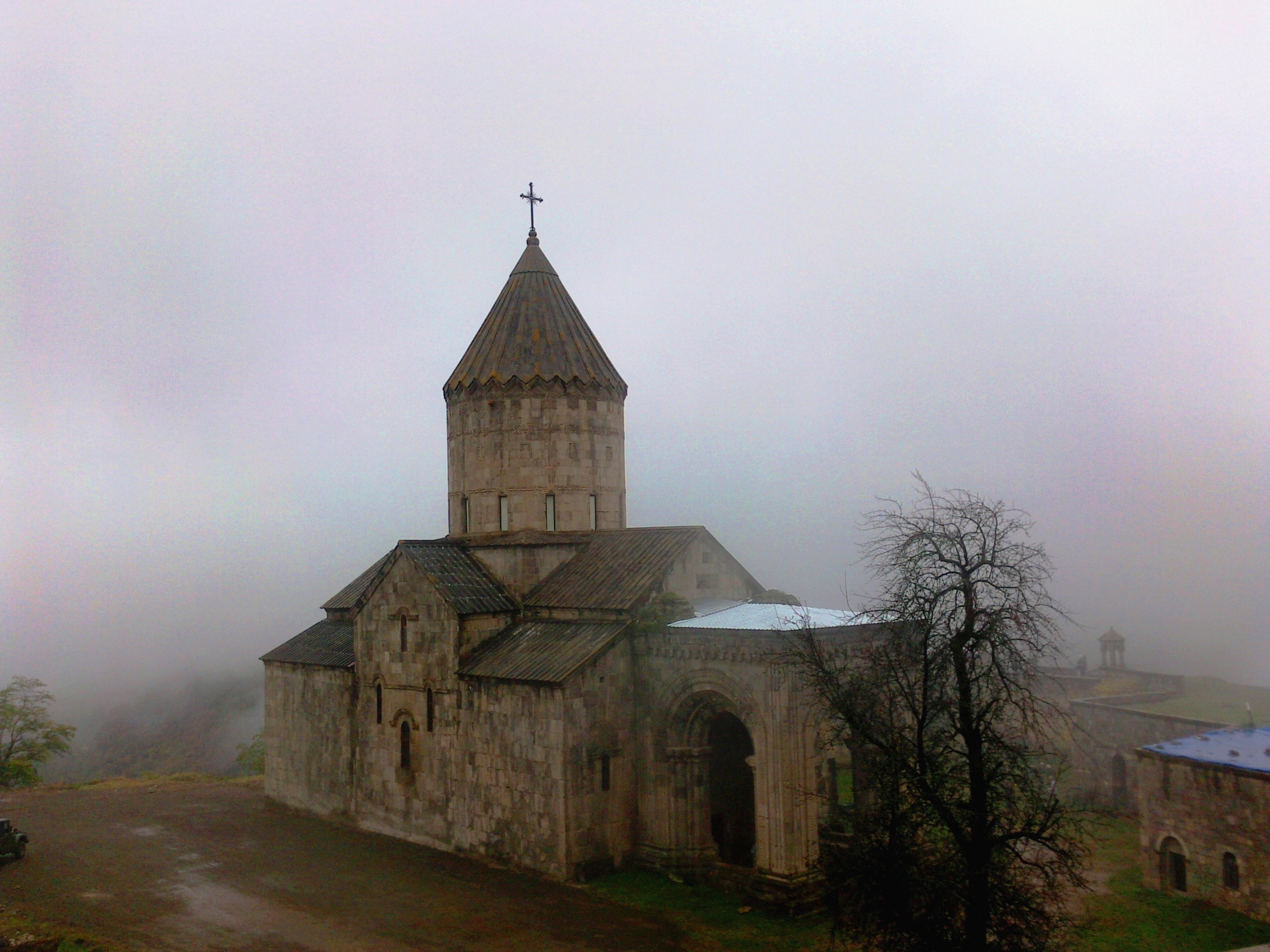
Saint Poghos-Petros Church, Tatev Monastery

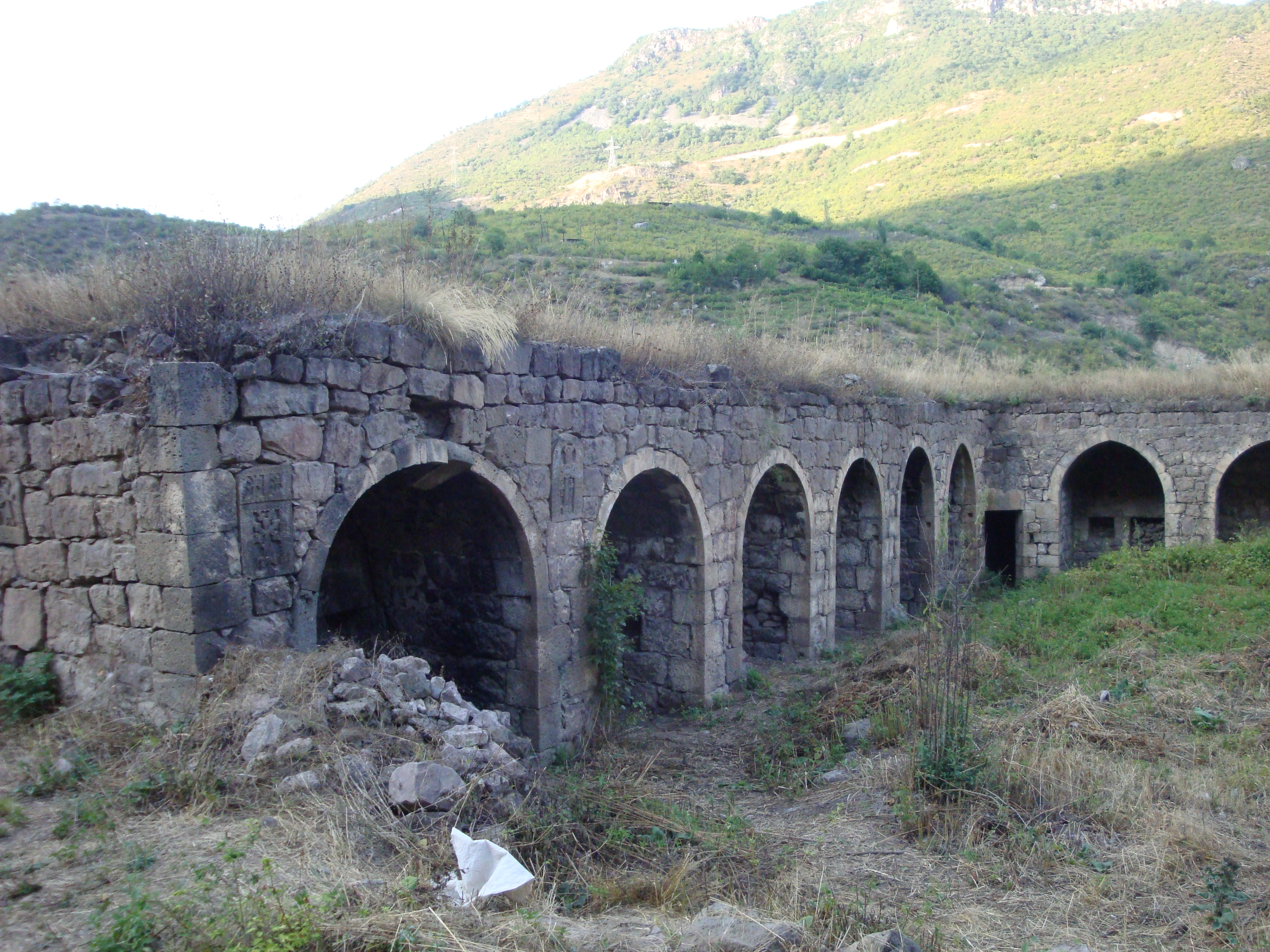
Tatevi Anapat

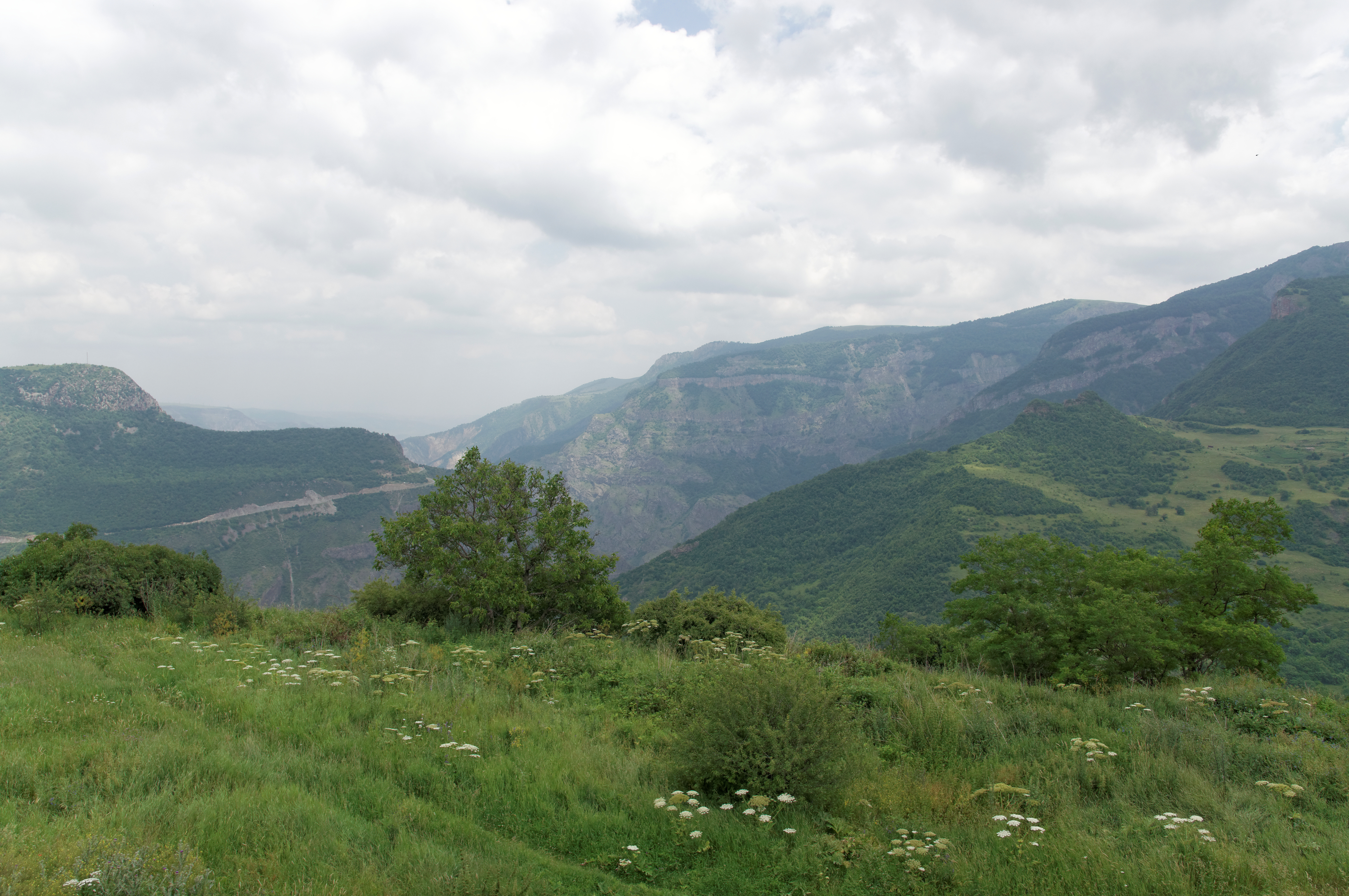
Scenery around the village

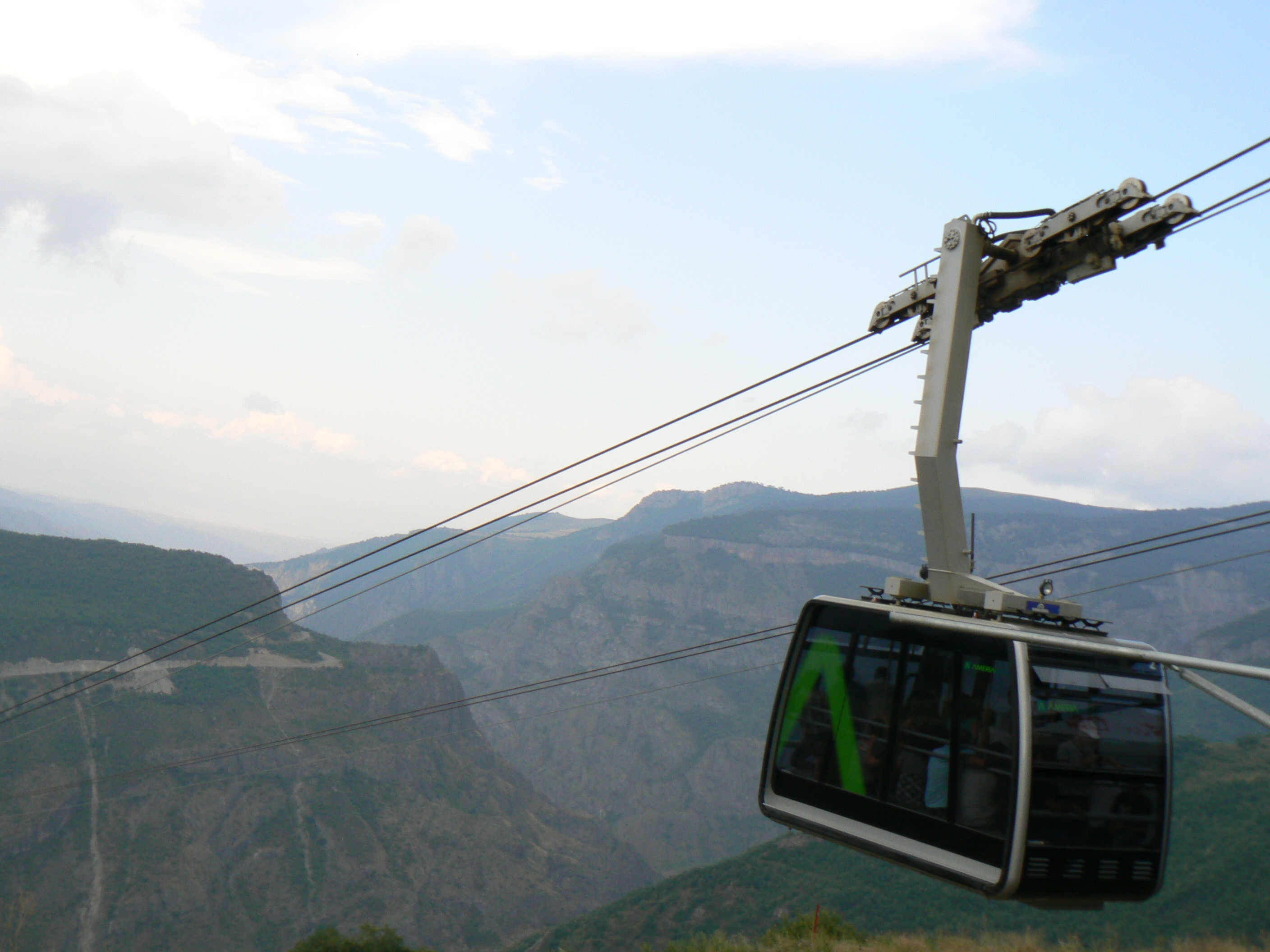
Wings of Tatev Tram

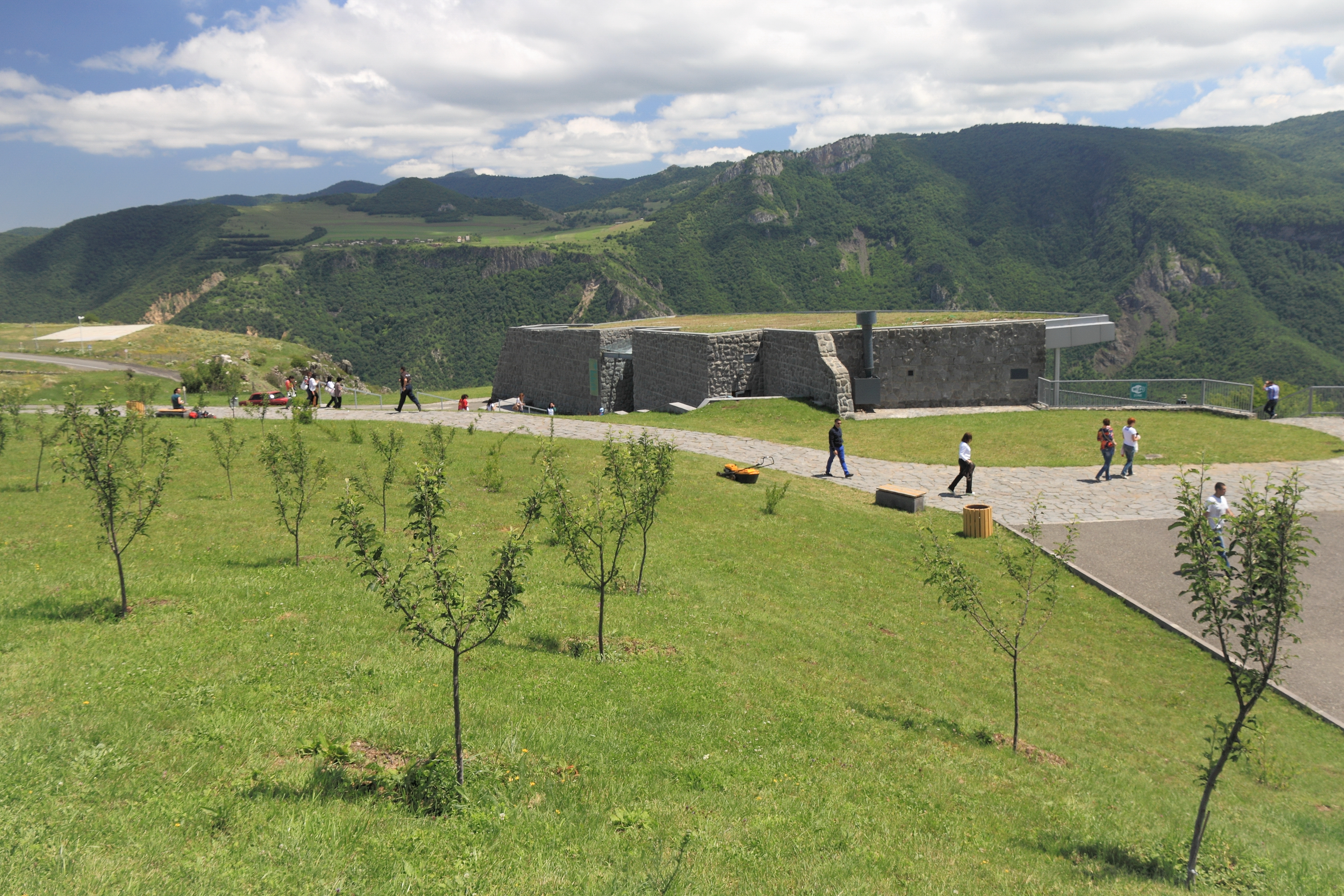
Wings of Tatev main building
