= Aramazd mountains =

Mountain range in Armenia

Aramazd Mountains
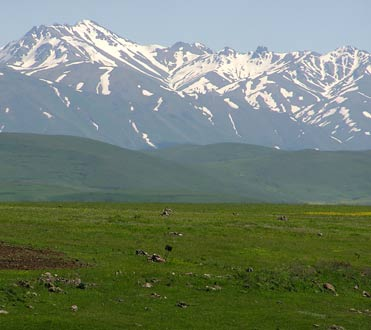

Highest point
- Elevation: 3,399 m (11,152 ft)
- Coordinates: 39°18′37″N 46°10′46″E

Geography
- Location within Armenia Location within Syunik Province
- Location: Armenia
- Parent range: Bargushat mountain range

The Aramazd mountains (Armenian: Արամազդ լեռնագագաթ) are located in Armenia. Mount Aramazd located in the south-east to Mount Aragats in the north-west.
