= Vernacular architecture of Armenia =

Armenian Vernacular architecture

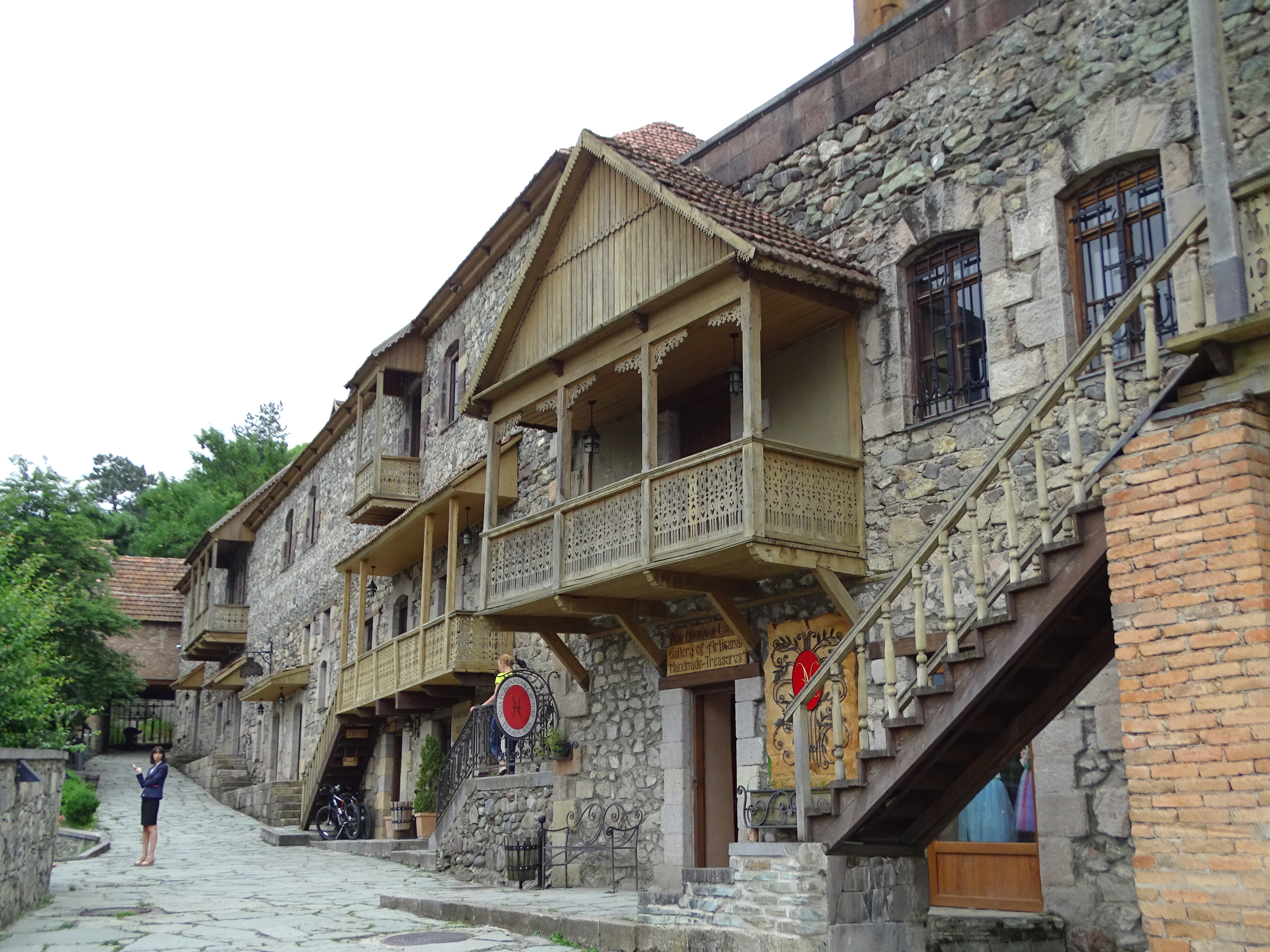
Traditional houses of Dilijan

The vernacular architecture of Armenia is based on long-standing Armenian architectural tradition starting from the times of Urartu to the modern day.

Vernacular architecture refers to the common architecture of the region, which is usually much simpler than what the technology of current time is able to provide. In Armenia, the mountainous terrain, abundance of the tuff stone of different colors as well as the peculiar geoposition of the Armenia itself, open to foreign invasions and attacks, played a pivotal role in the development of the national style of vernacular architecture.

== History ==
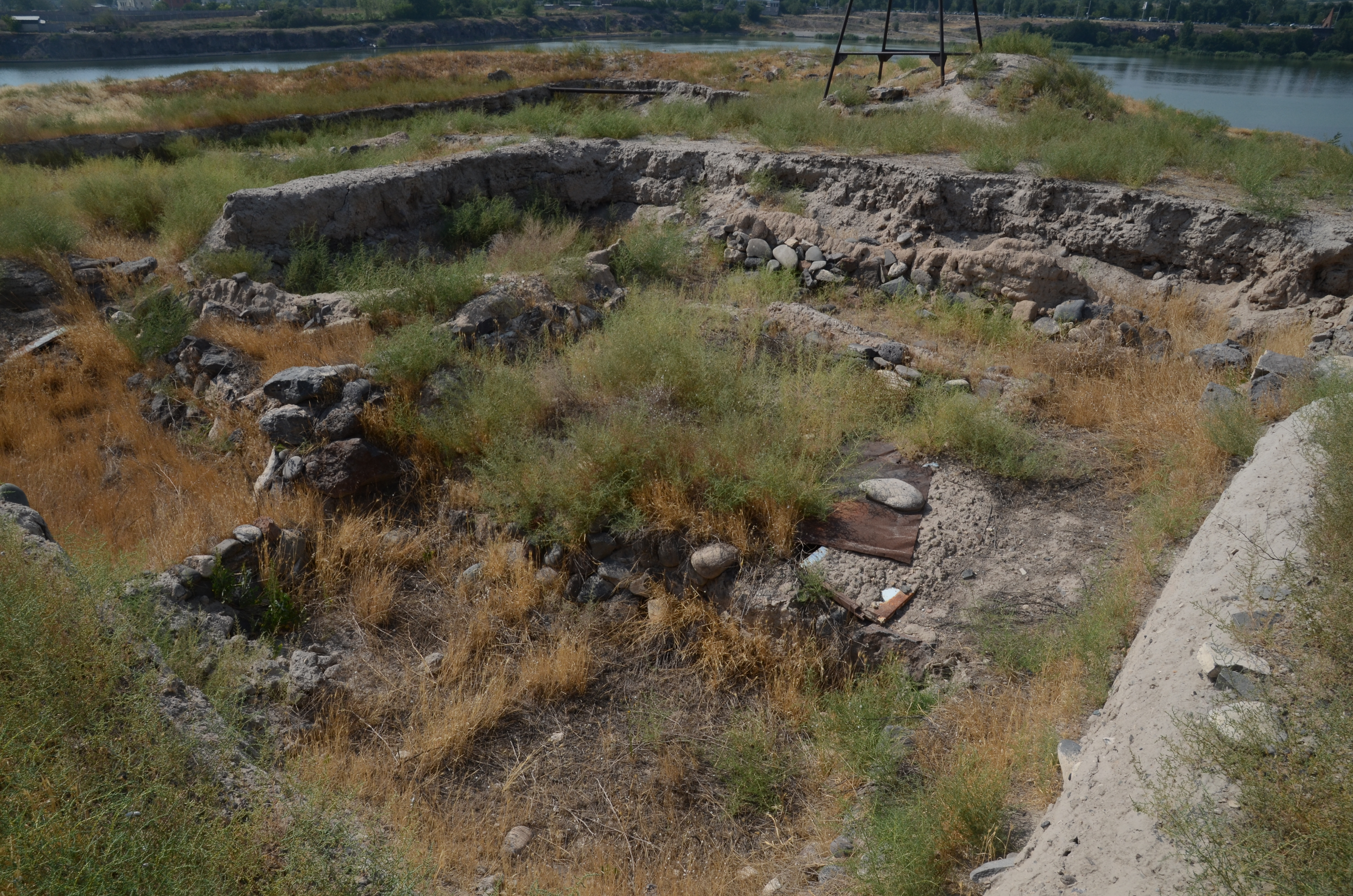
Shengavit site in Yerevan is a notable example of Neolithic Armenian vernacular architecture

Armenian vernacular architecture has its origins in Kura-Araxes culture, one of the sites of which, Shengavit settlement, lies on the territory of modern day Yerevan, where people lived in interconnected rectangular and circular mud-brick and stone buildings, surrounded by the protective war. Furthermore, Shengavit settlement was divided in separate districts by occupation and social standing. Copper traders, stone workers and farmers occupied the first district, while merchants lived in the other one. The other known settlement of that era on the territory of modern Armenia is the Metsamor castle.

During the Middle Ages, Armenian vernacular tradition was flourishing in the cities of Ani and Dvin, which became the capitals of Bagratid Armenia and Arminiya respectively. The vernacular architecture of Ani was primarily represented by two types of dwellings: caves and regular housing units built out of red tuff stone. There are 800 identified cave chambers within the site of Ani, and people continued to live in some of them into 21-th century. These chambers were not restricted to dwellings, some very used for the funerary purpose, as graves, some served as churches. Caves, which were used as domestic dwellings were usually sealed by timber or rubble walls. Interior had small niches for lamps, sleeping and storage, all connected to the large central chamber. It is estimated that the rock-cut section of Ani had 2000 inhabitants at its peak. The little is known of Ani's conventional vernacular architecture, but it is supposed that they were constructed out of the same material as churches, red volcanic tuff stone.

== Eastern Armenia ==
=== Syunik ===
In Syunik the vernacular architecture is usually characterised by the cave dwellings with narrow streets leading from one cave to another. Sometimes the caves had an adjacent houses with wooden balconies, as can still be seen in the old part of Khot village, but those were mostly abandoned and devastated due to the policy of resettlement by the Soviet union, which is why close to nothing have been left in Old Goris, except cave dwellings. The architecture was mostly built out of local stone, gray in colour around Goris and beige around Meghri.

The Soviet architecture of Syunik was also inspired by the vernacular architecture of the region and made out of similar material.

The famous sites of Syunik-style vernacular architecture are the following:

- Old Khot
- Old Shinuhayr
- Old Halidzor
- Old Tegh
- Old town of Goris
- Poqr Tagh district of Meghri
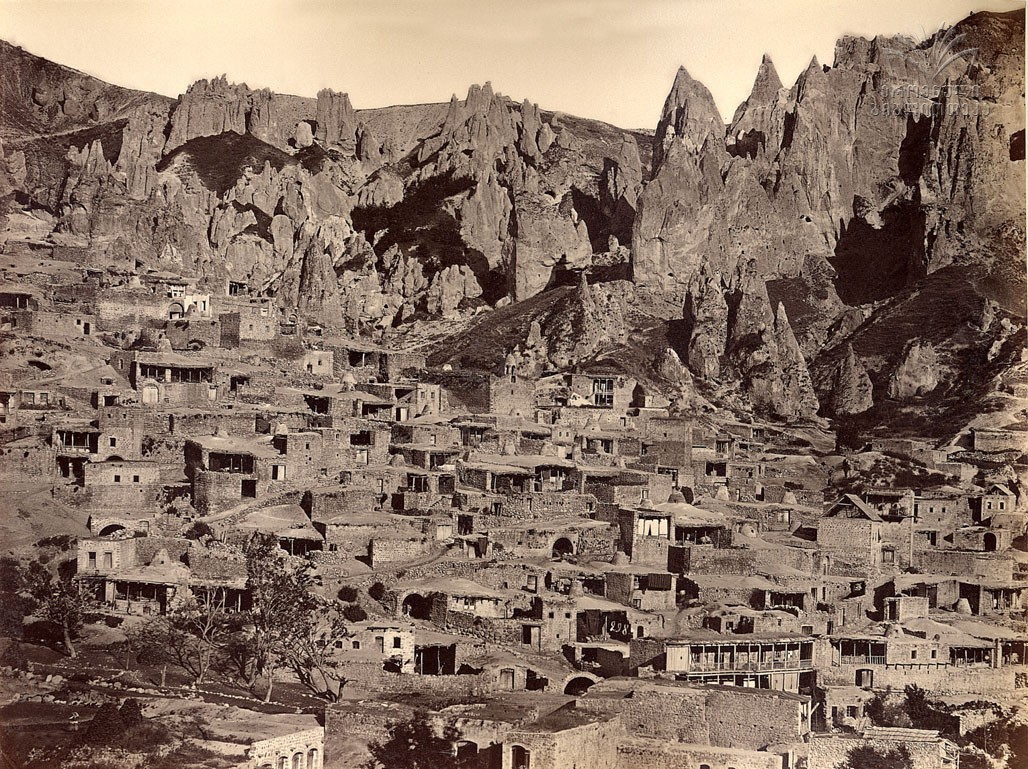
Old town of Goris

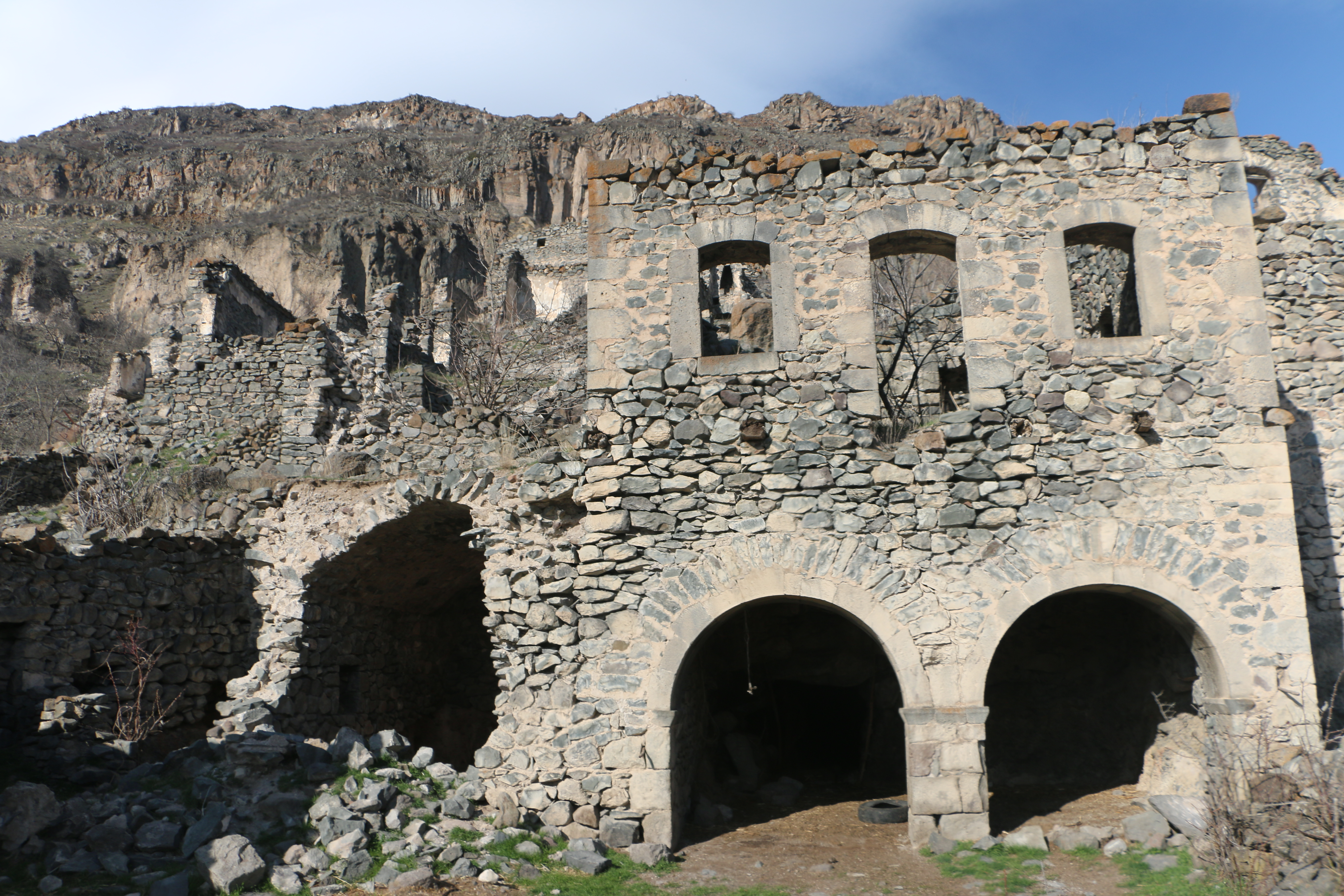
Example of the house in the Old part of Khot village.

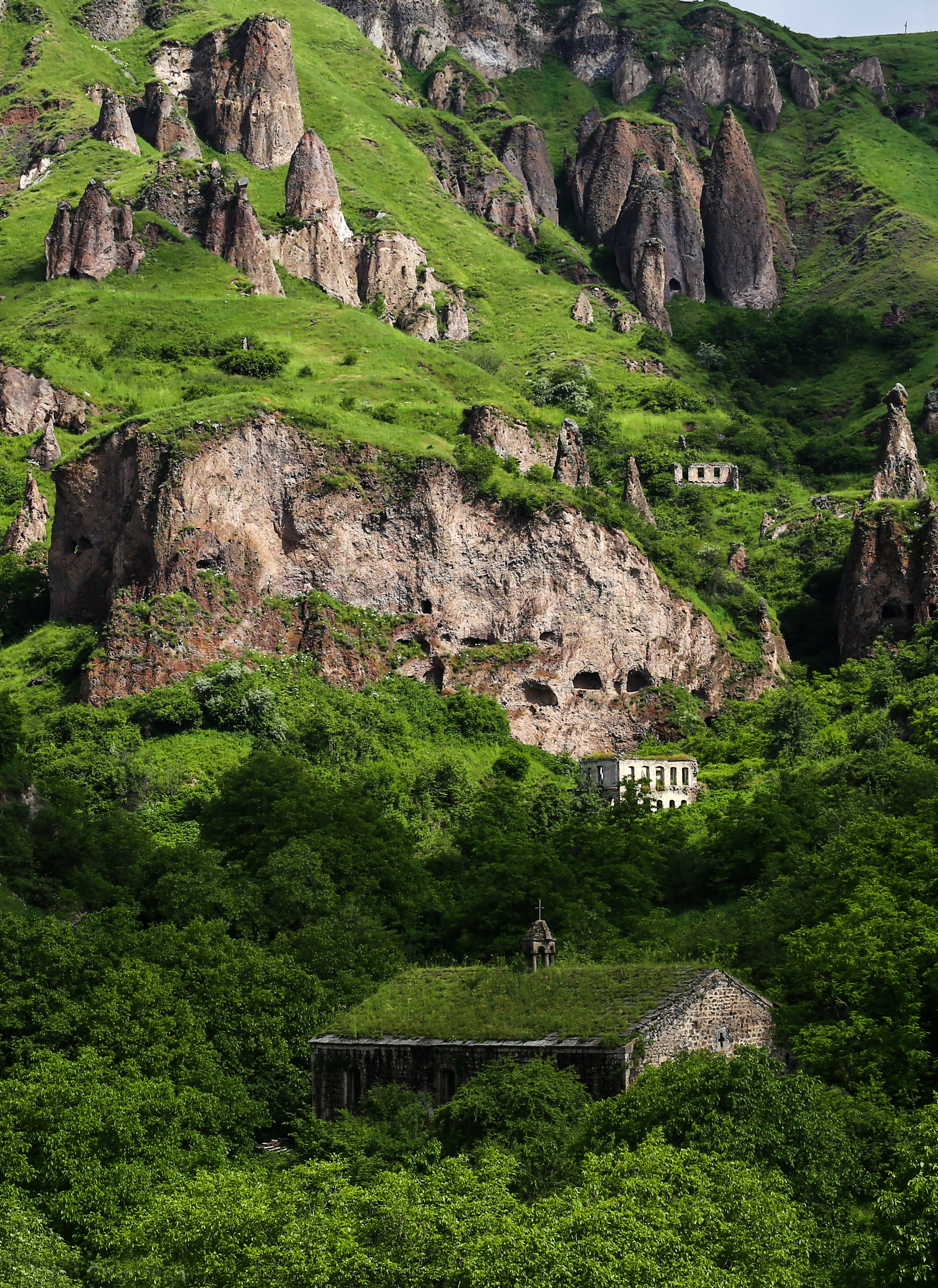
The old part of Khndzoresk

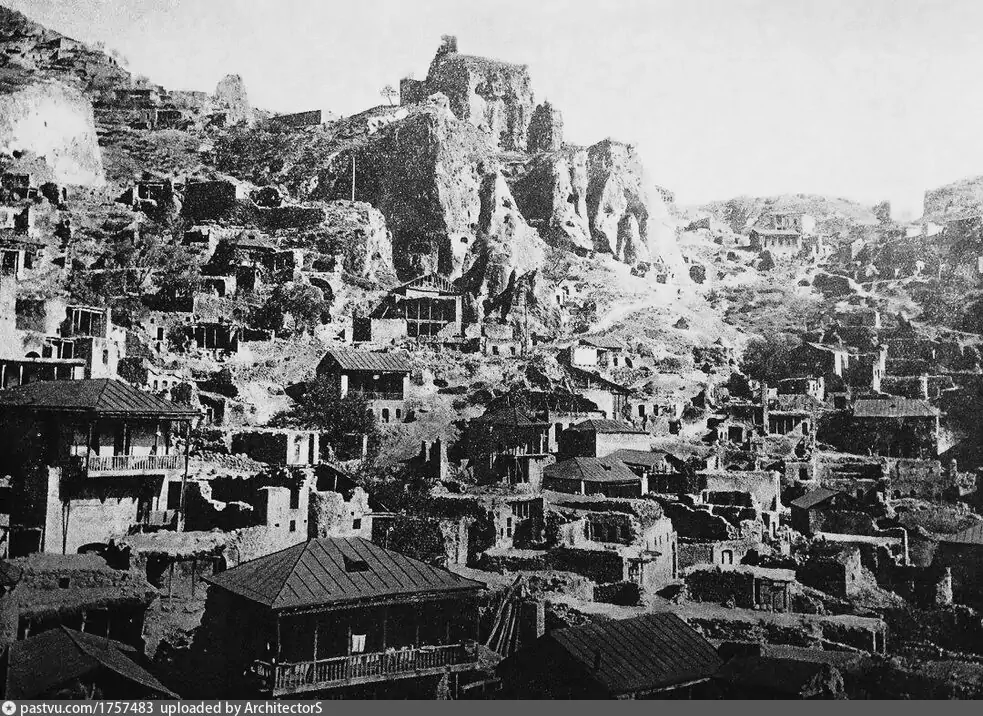
Khndzoresk caves in 1920

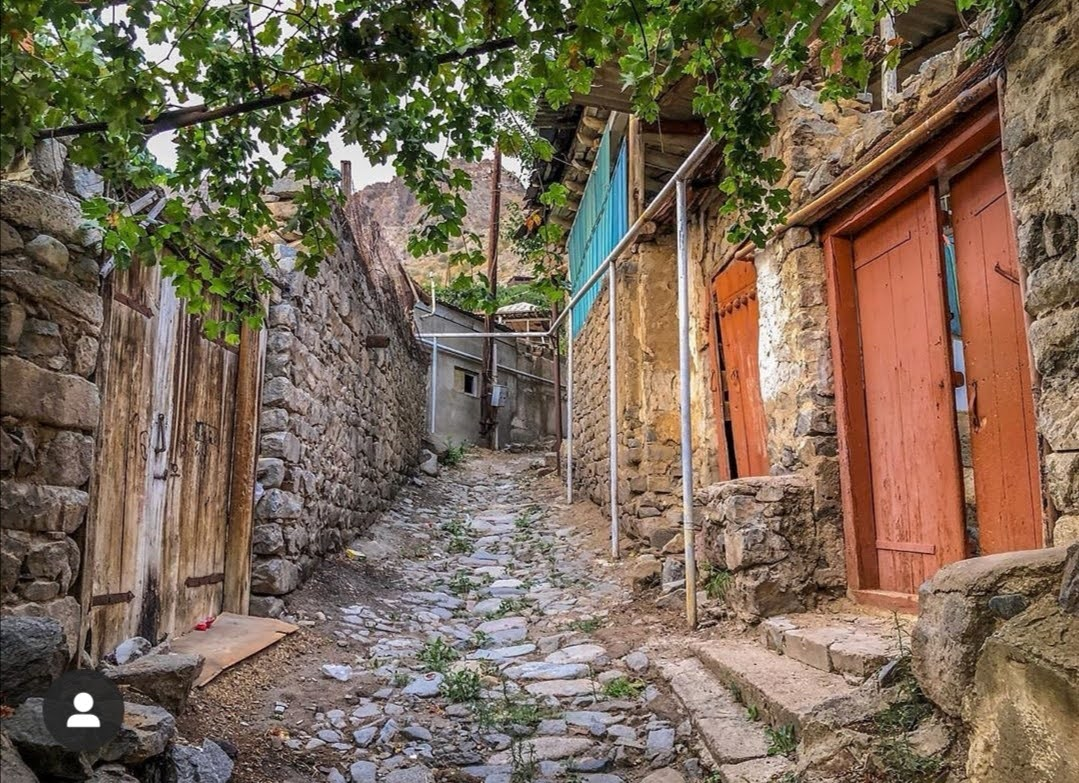
A street in Pokr Tagh, Meghri

=== Tavush ===
The vernacular architecture of Tavush region is predominantly represented by Dilijan, which had its own distinct style among the other Armenian cities, by incorporating the architectural elements of Baku and Tbilisi, as well as of Molokan architecture, which distinguished it from the other Armenian towns. Dilijan was famous for not only the carved balconies and terraced houses (which were the features of Tbilisi as well), but also by the whitewashed plastered walls, carved railings, beams and the unique bannisters.

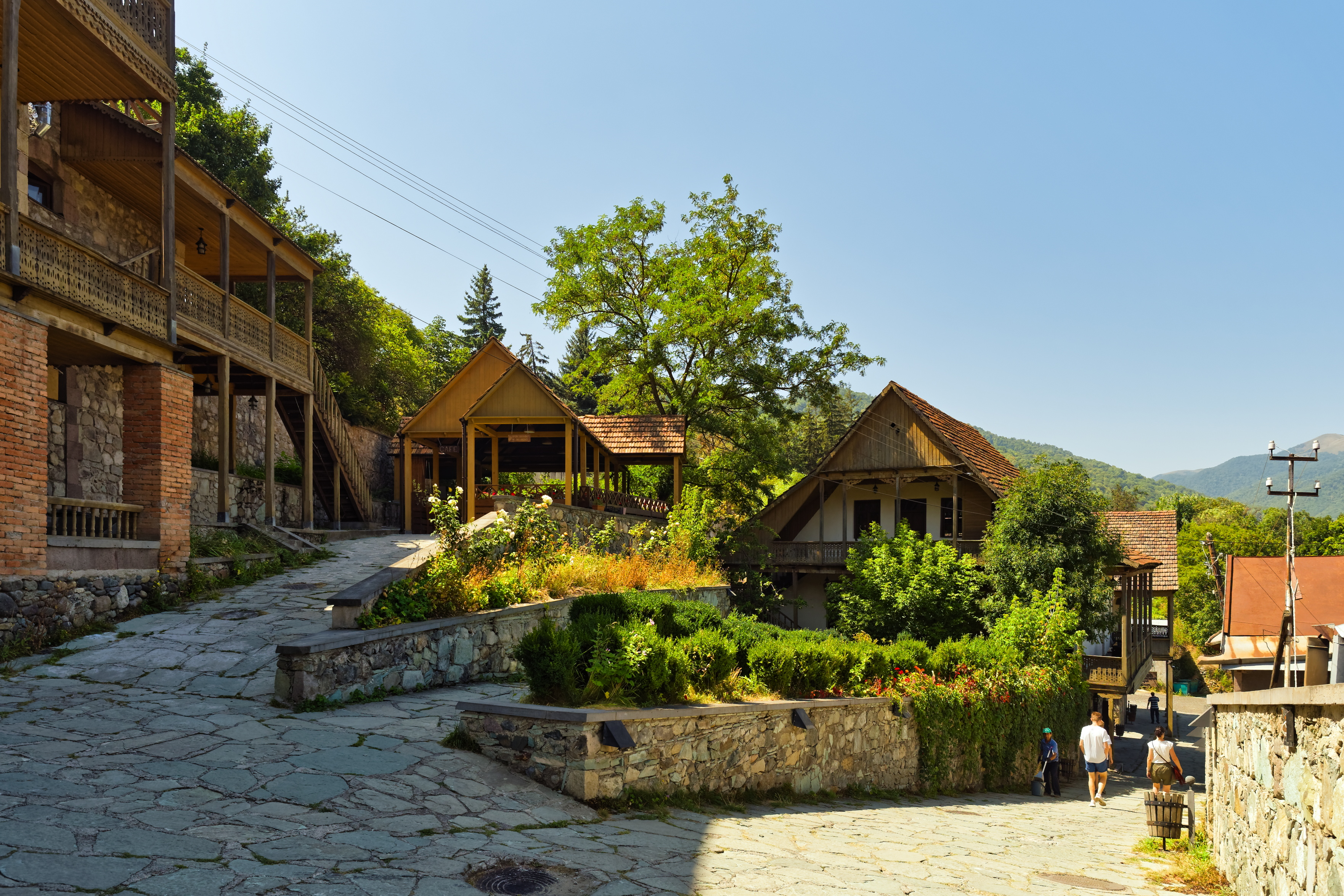
Traditional houses in Dilijan

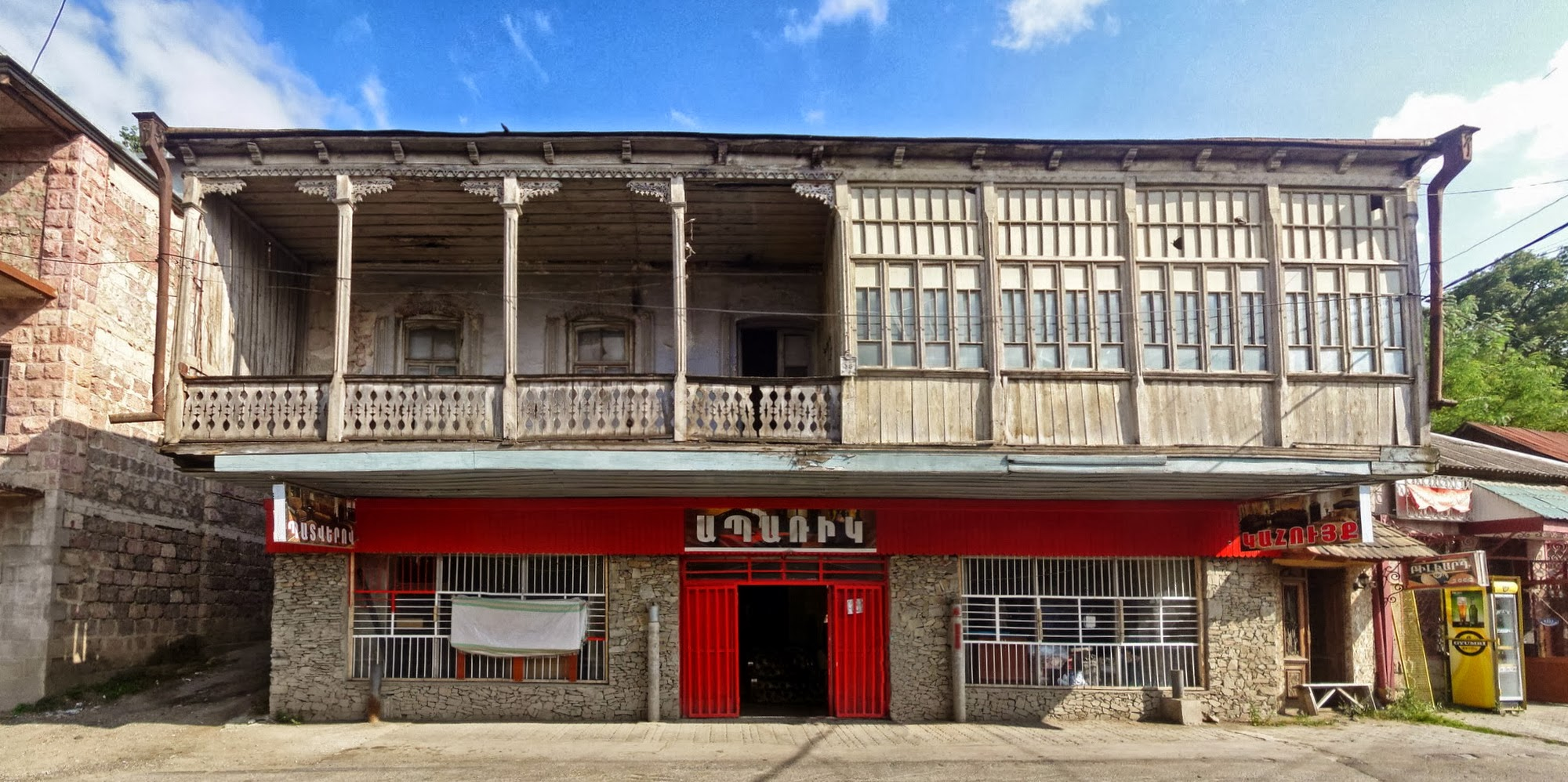
Old house in Dilijan

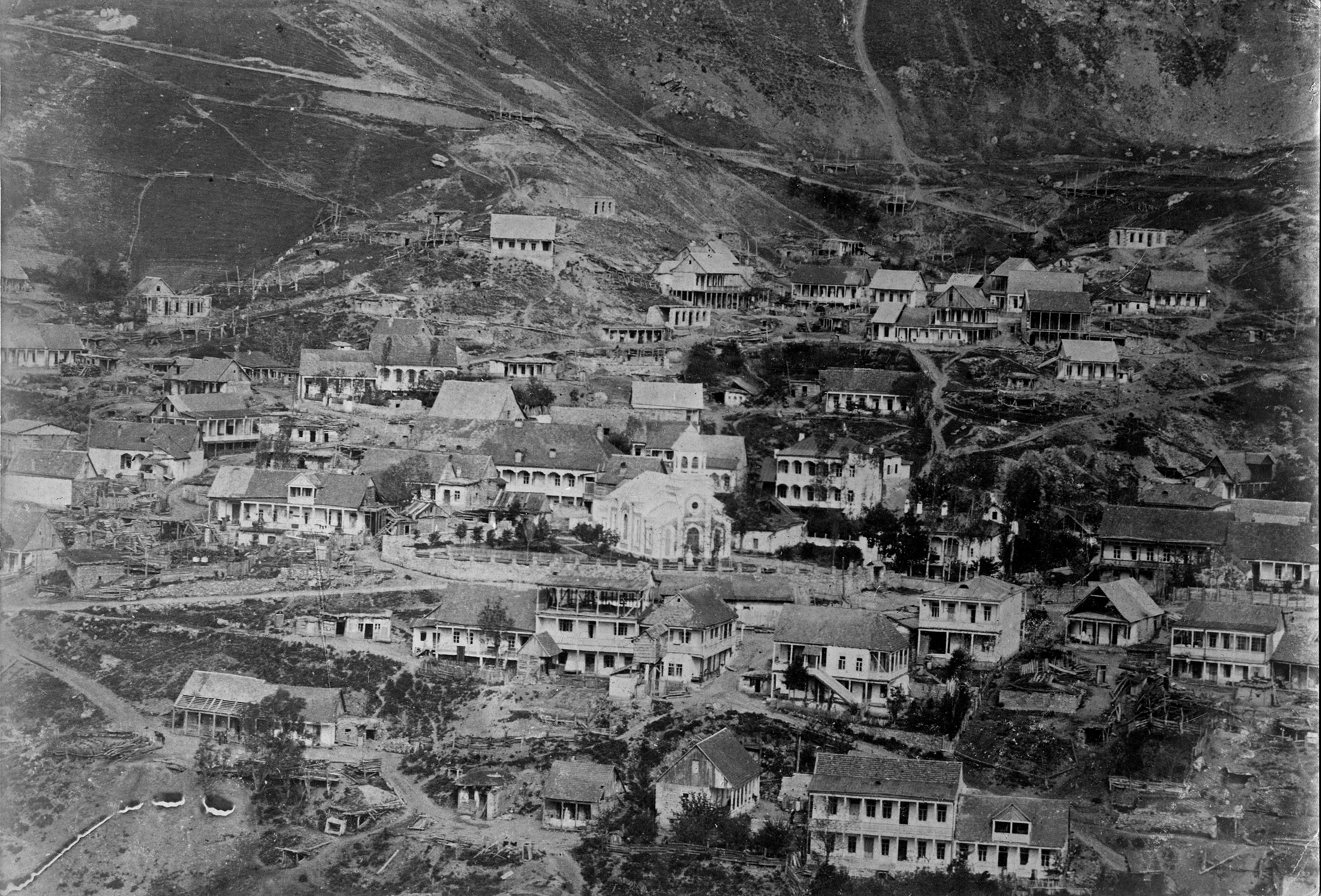
Old Panorama of Dilijan

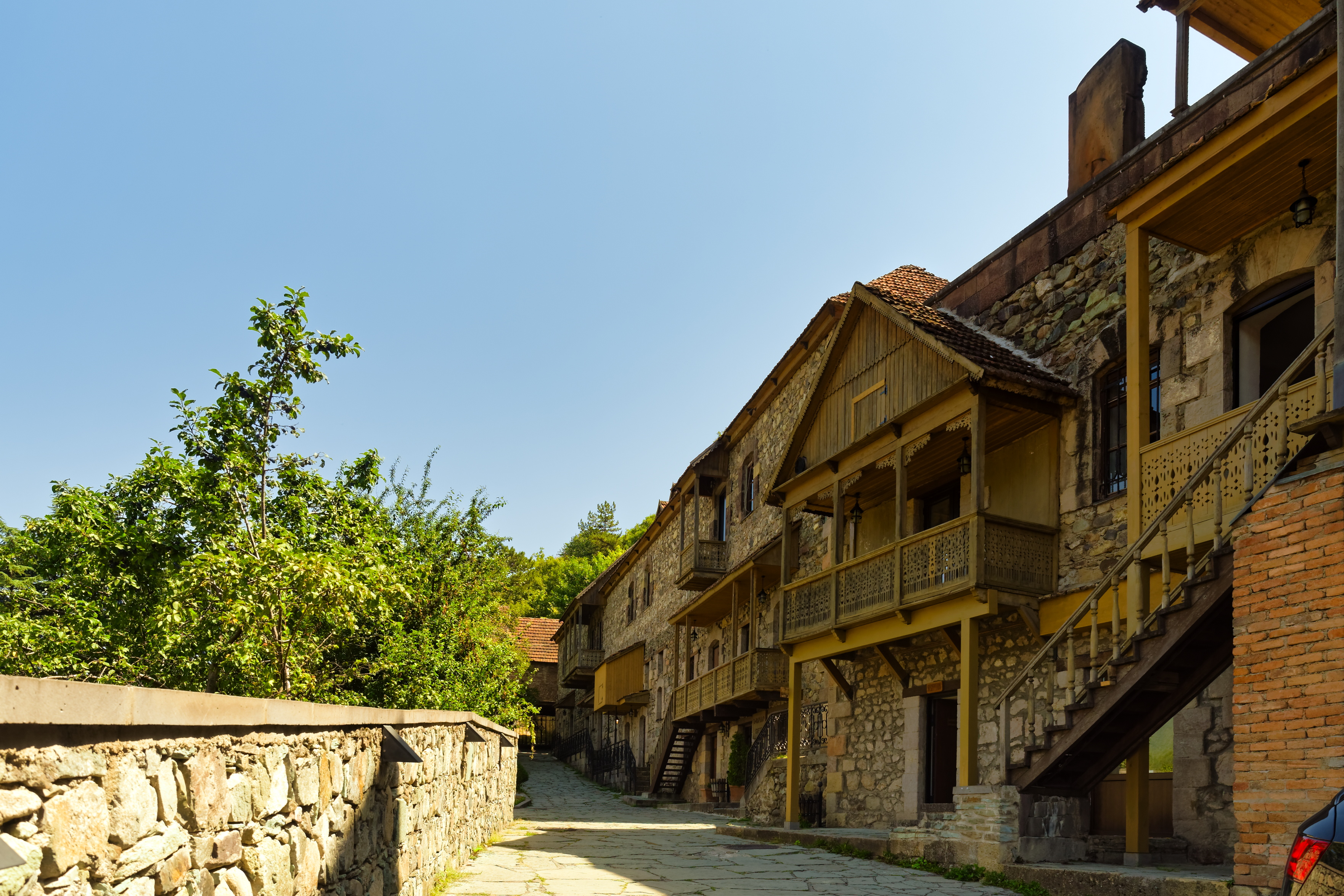
Old houses of Dilijan

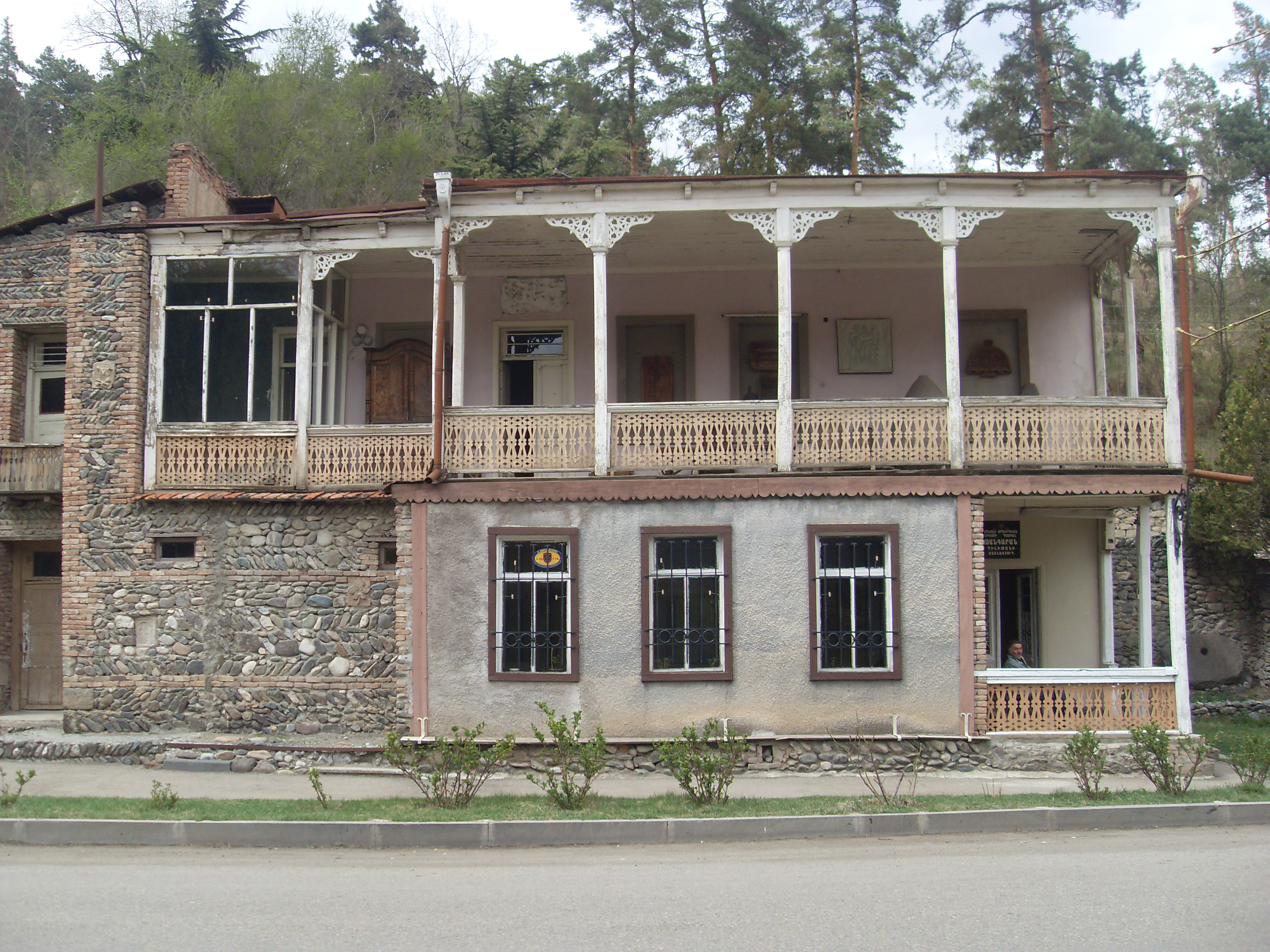
Traditional house of Dilijan

=== Lori ===
In Lori, the vernacular architecture was primarily represented by Vanadzor and Stepanavan. Not much remains of it now due to the uncontrolled development, which led to the devastation of the area. The little of what remains can be observed in Vanadzor, Tashir and Stepanavan. Vernaculars of Lori are almost exclusively one-story, have white plastered walls and ceramic tile roofs with carved wooden balconies reminding of Tbilisi. One of the best surviving examples of this example is a Stepan Shahumyan house-museum in Stepanavan.

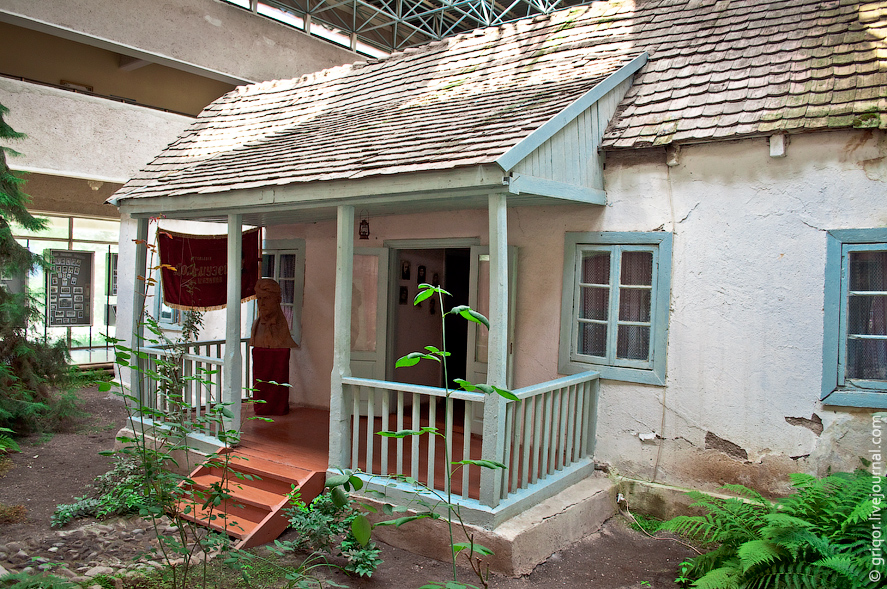
Stepan Shaumyan house-museum

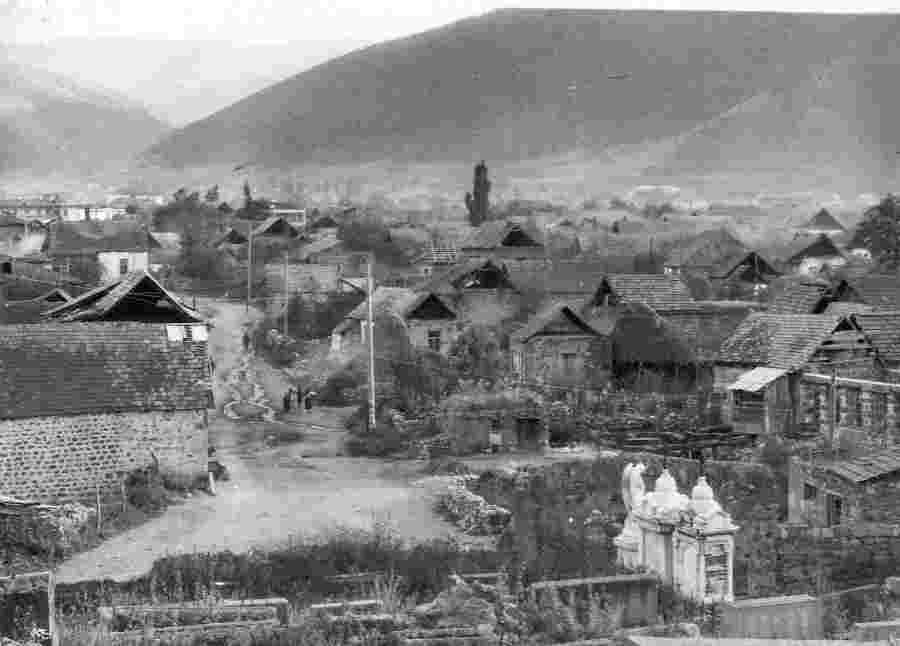
View of Vanadzor

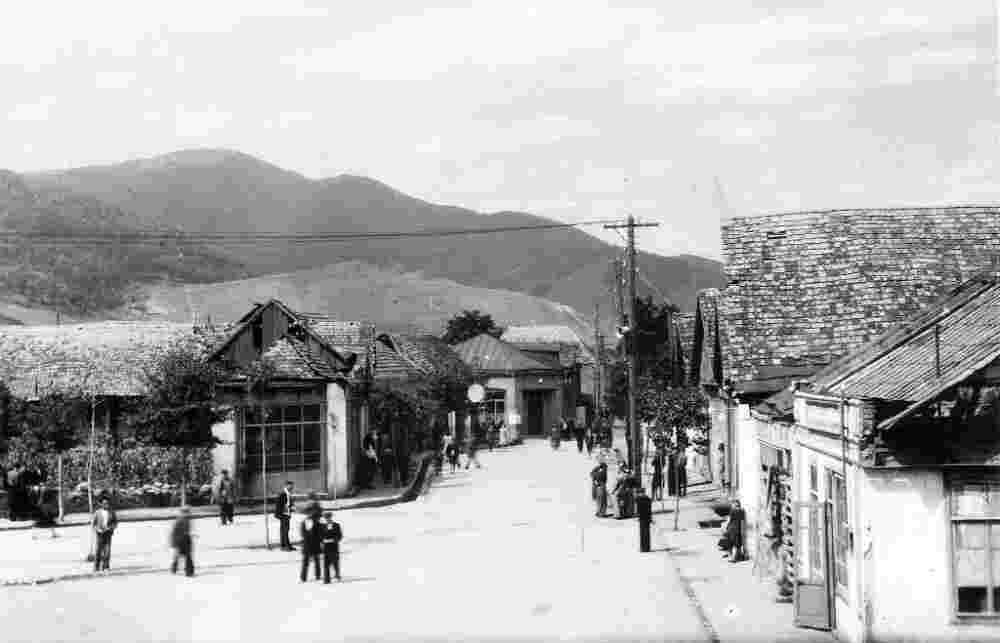
Merchant square in Vanadzor

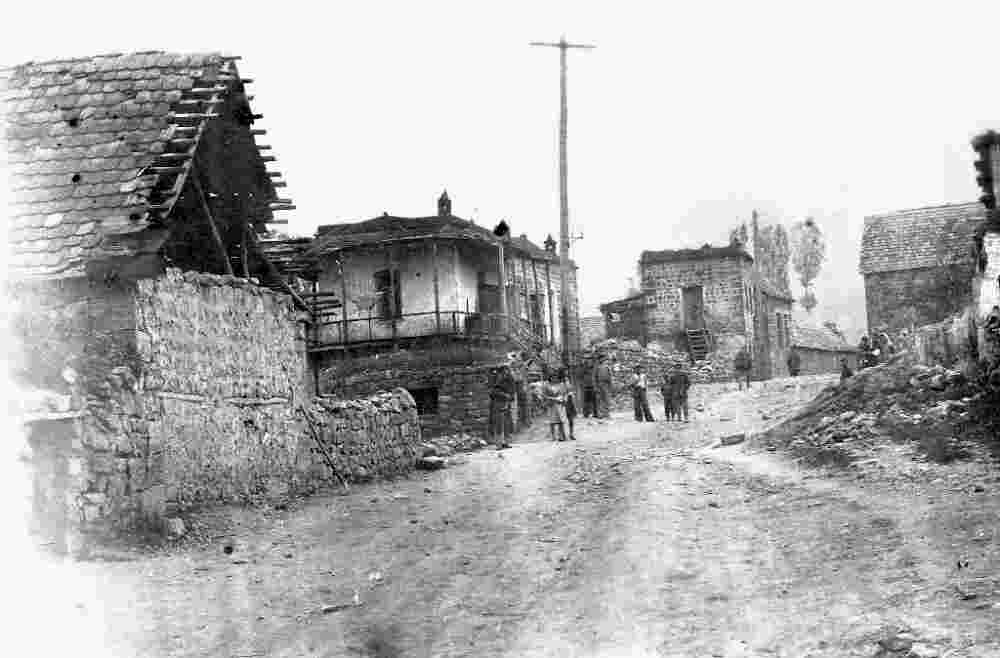
Street in Vanadzor historical center

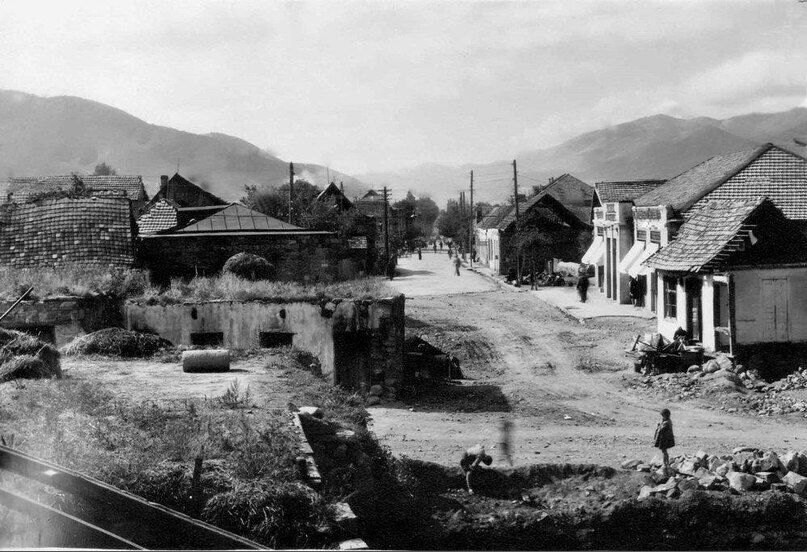
Street in Vanadzor

=== Yerevan and surrounding areas ===
The vernacular architecture of Yerevan and the surrounding area is best represented by Kond district. The vernaculars of Yerevan can be characterised by the flat roofs, which often serve as a terrace to another house and stone as a primarily material. Sometimes building can have a wooden balcony, which was often carved, but nowadays little remains of them.

Yerevan vernacular heritage was devastated during the Soviet rule, with some districts, such as Dzoragyugh and Demir-bulagh being demolished completely according to the city plan by Tamanian. Noragyugh is planned to be demolished to build a "New Yerevan" district, while others, such as Nork and Kond lack maintenance.

The following districts in Yerevan could be considered historical:

- Kond
- Old Nork
- Kanaker
- Noragyugh
- Avan
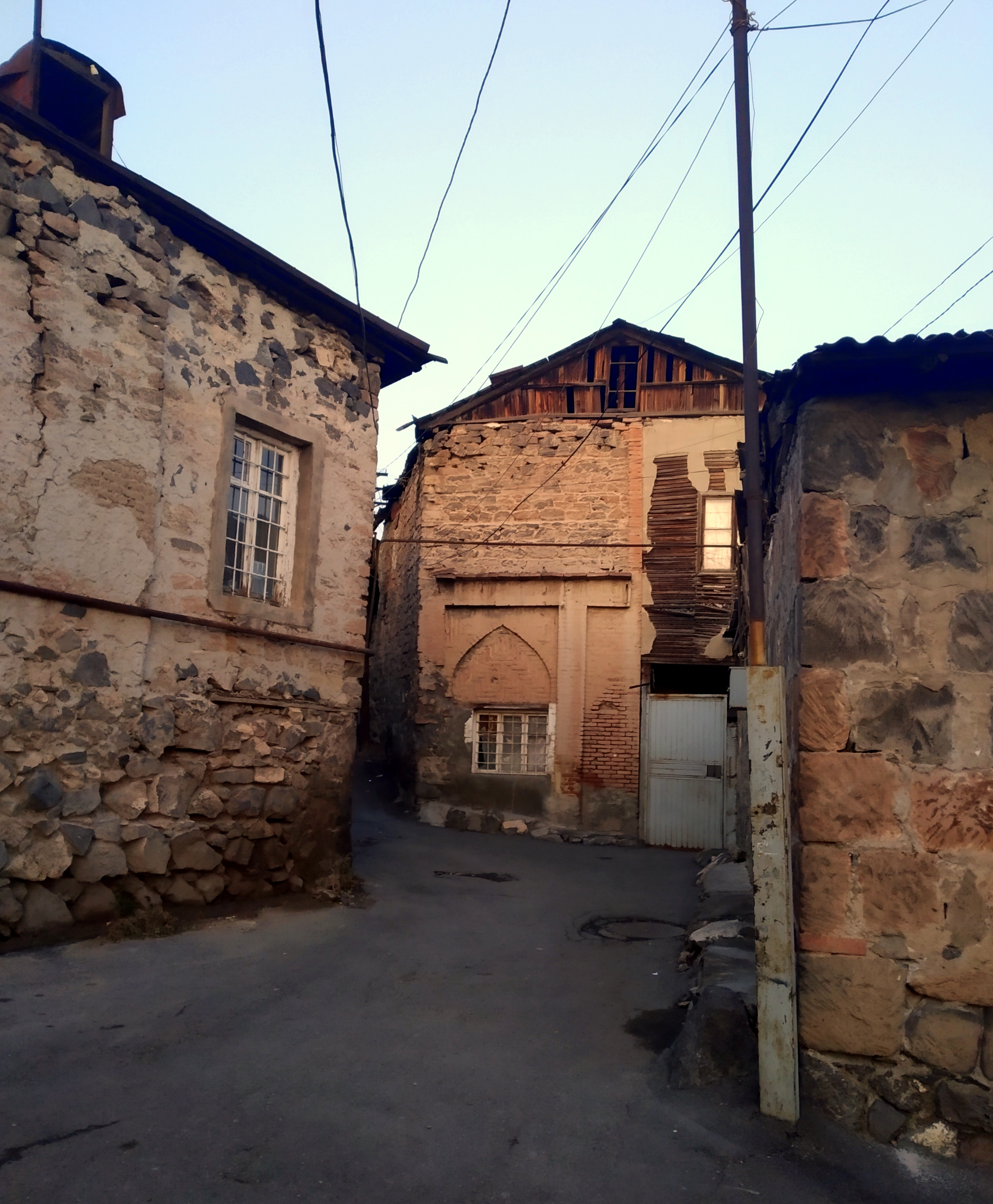
Street in Kond leading to the mosque

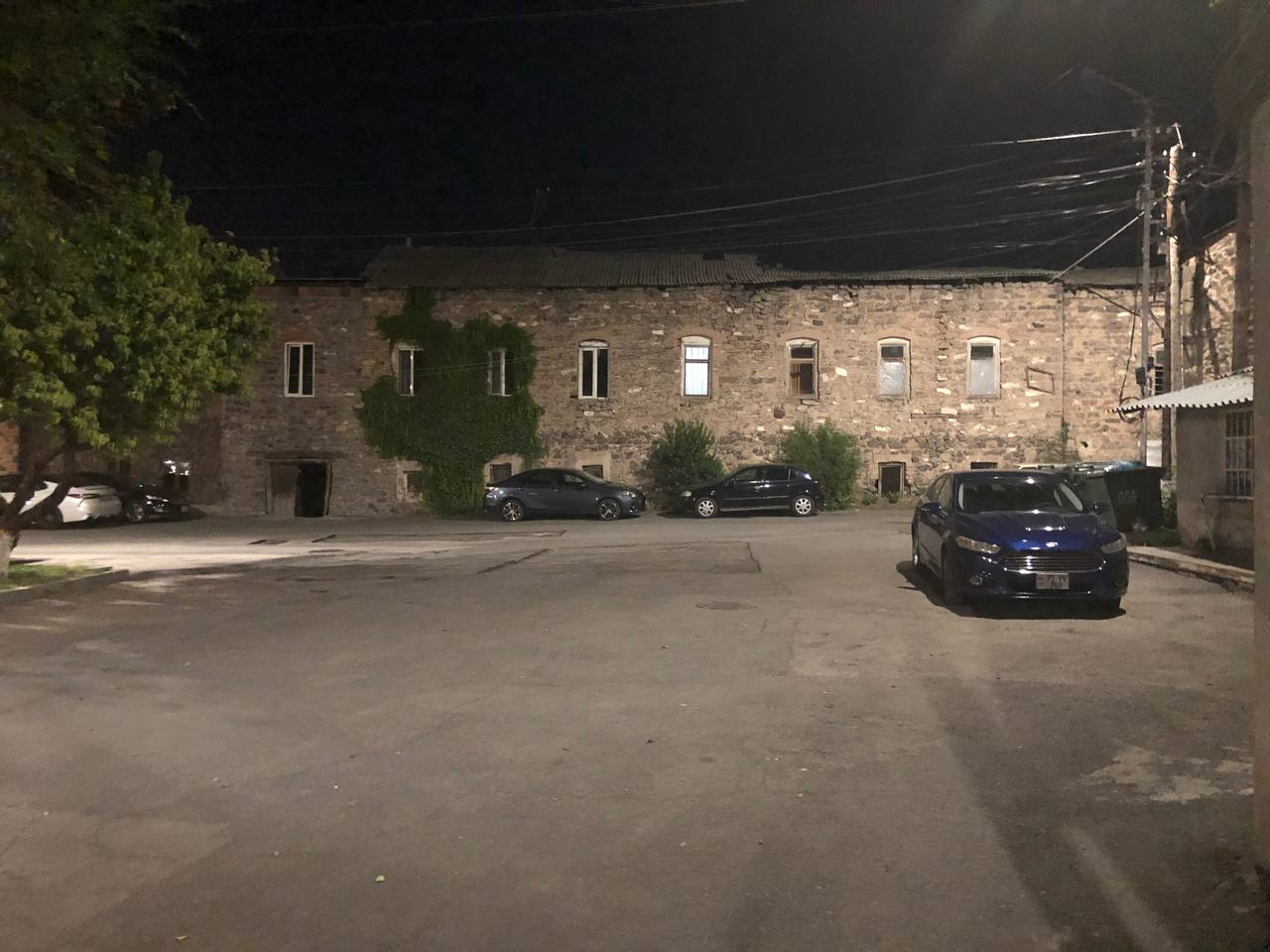
Old house in Old Nork

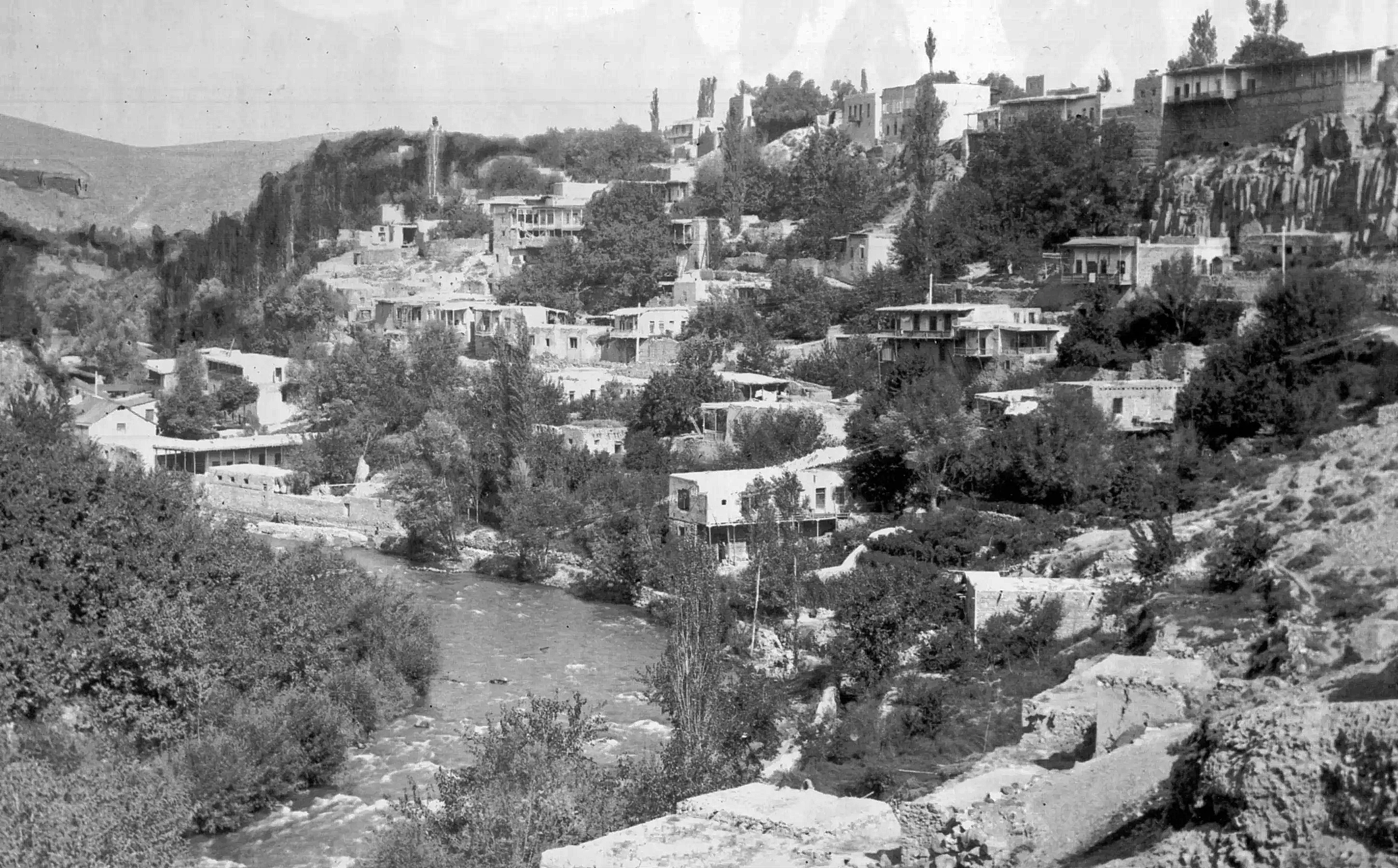
Old photo of Dzoragyugh vernacular district

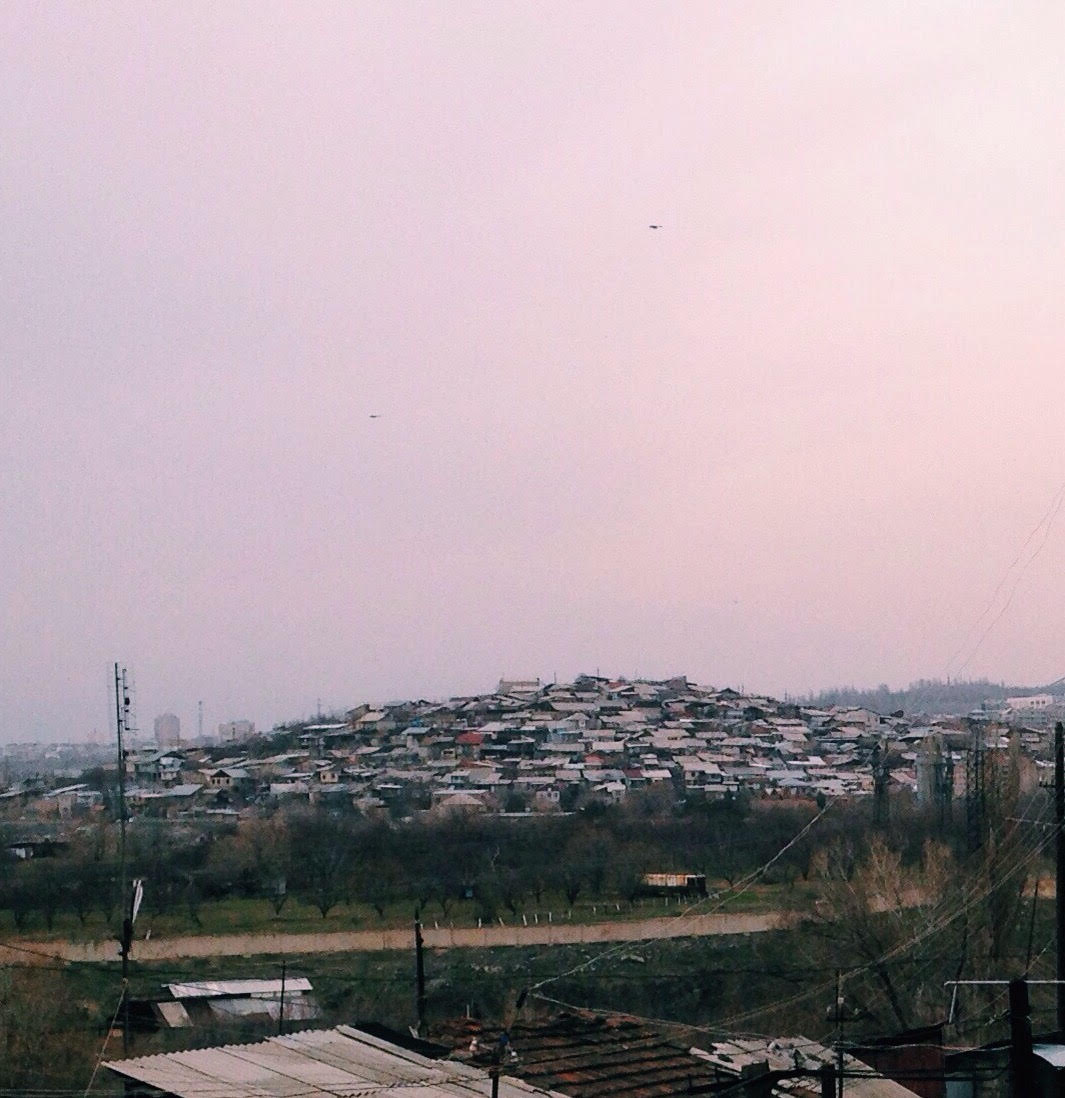
Panoramic view of Noragyugh

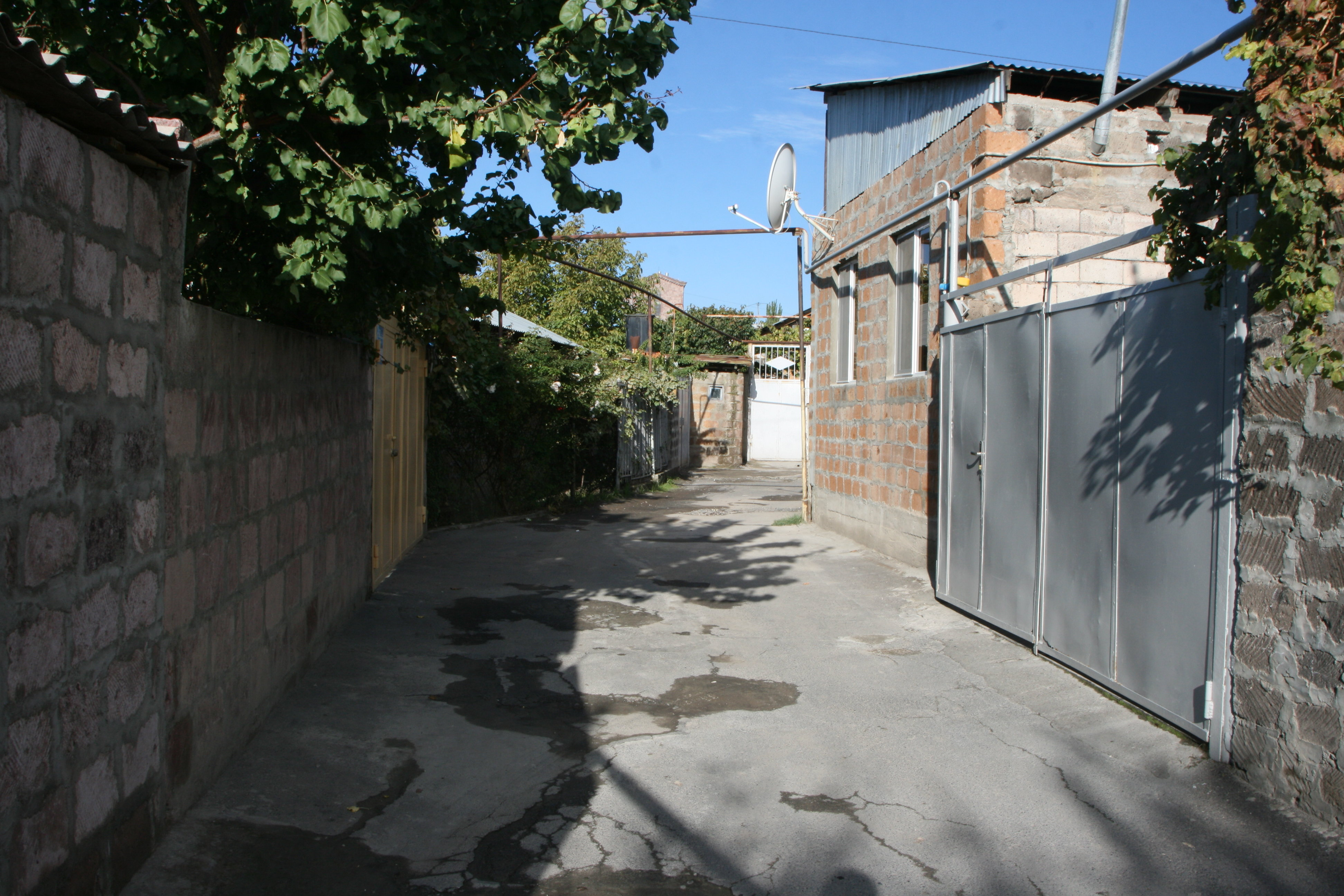
Street in Noragyugh

== Western Armenia ==
The vernacular architecture of Western Armenia suffered huge damage during the Turkish War of Independence, World War I, Armenian Genocide and various earthquakes. For example, the old town of Van, where a lot of important vernacular Armenian architecture was contained, was demolished in course of World War I. The city of Harpoot suffered the same fate with remaining parts diminishing due to the city of Elaziğ, which was rapidly developing during the Republican Era.

Armenian cities in mountainous Cilicia, primarily Zeitun, Hadjin and Sis, had also been devastated by rebellions and subsequent massacres of Armenian population.

In general, the following towns continue to serve as an example of vernacular Western Armenian architecture to some extent. The vernaculars town centers in these cities are not exclusively Armenian due to the substantial Kurdish, Turkish, Greek and Georgian presence:

- Old town of Bitlis
- Kemaliye
- Old Tarsus
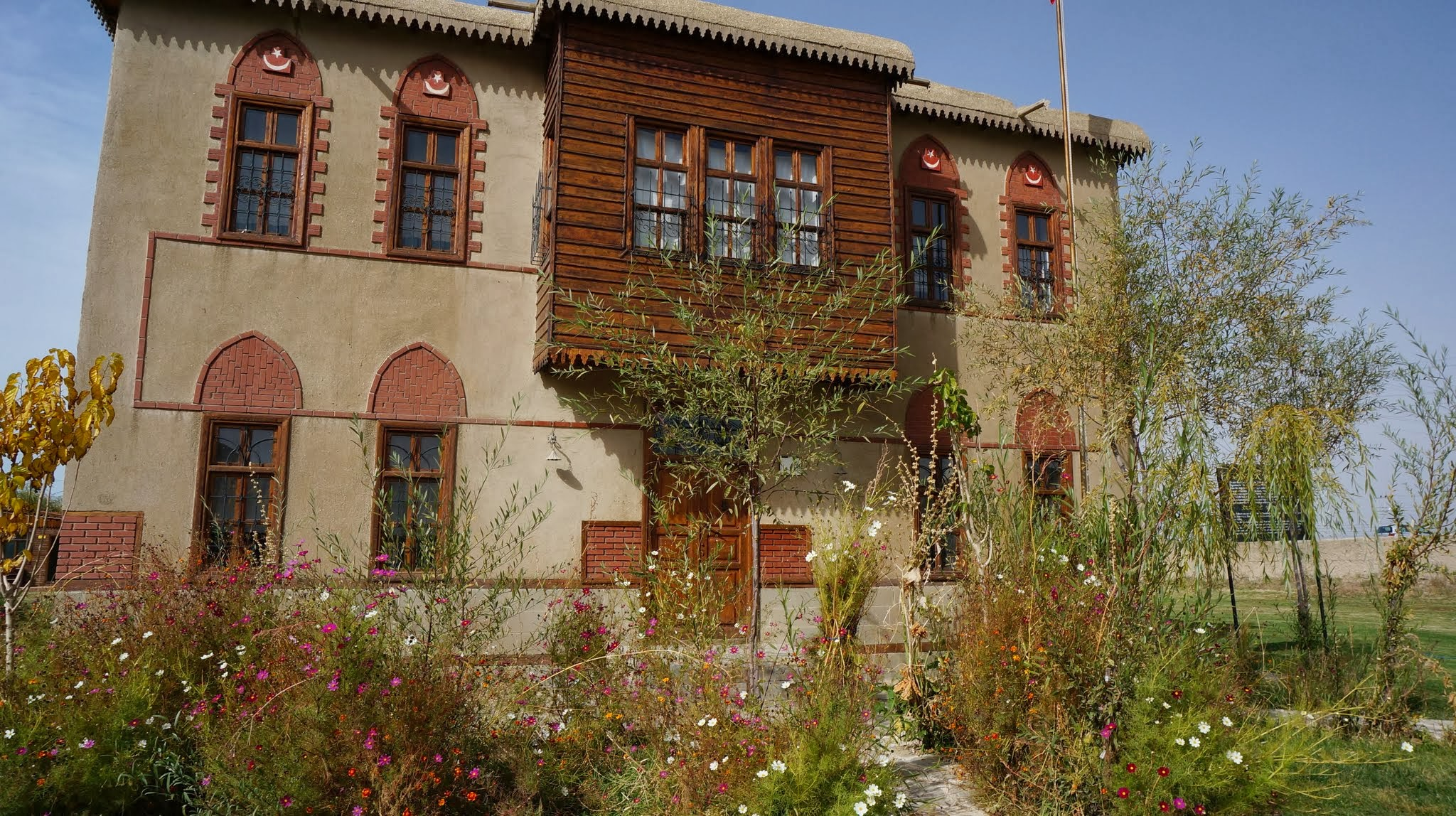
Replica of 19th-century house in Van

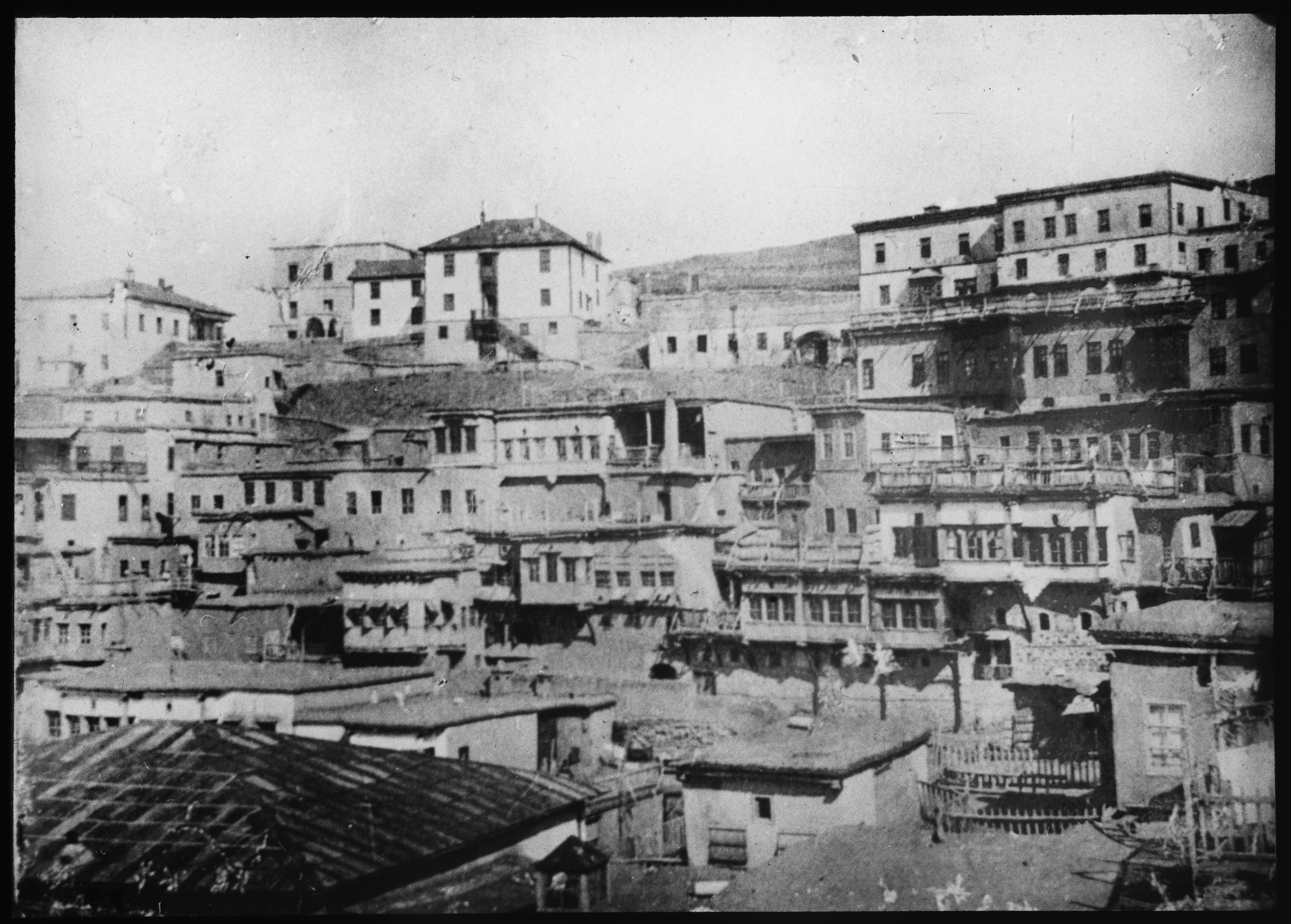
Old photo of Harpoot

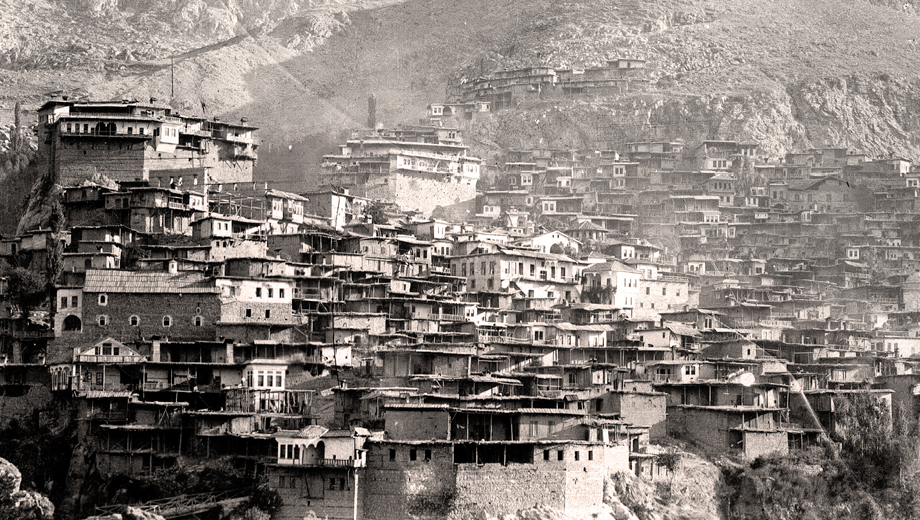
Panorama of Zeytun

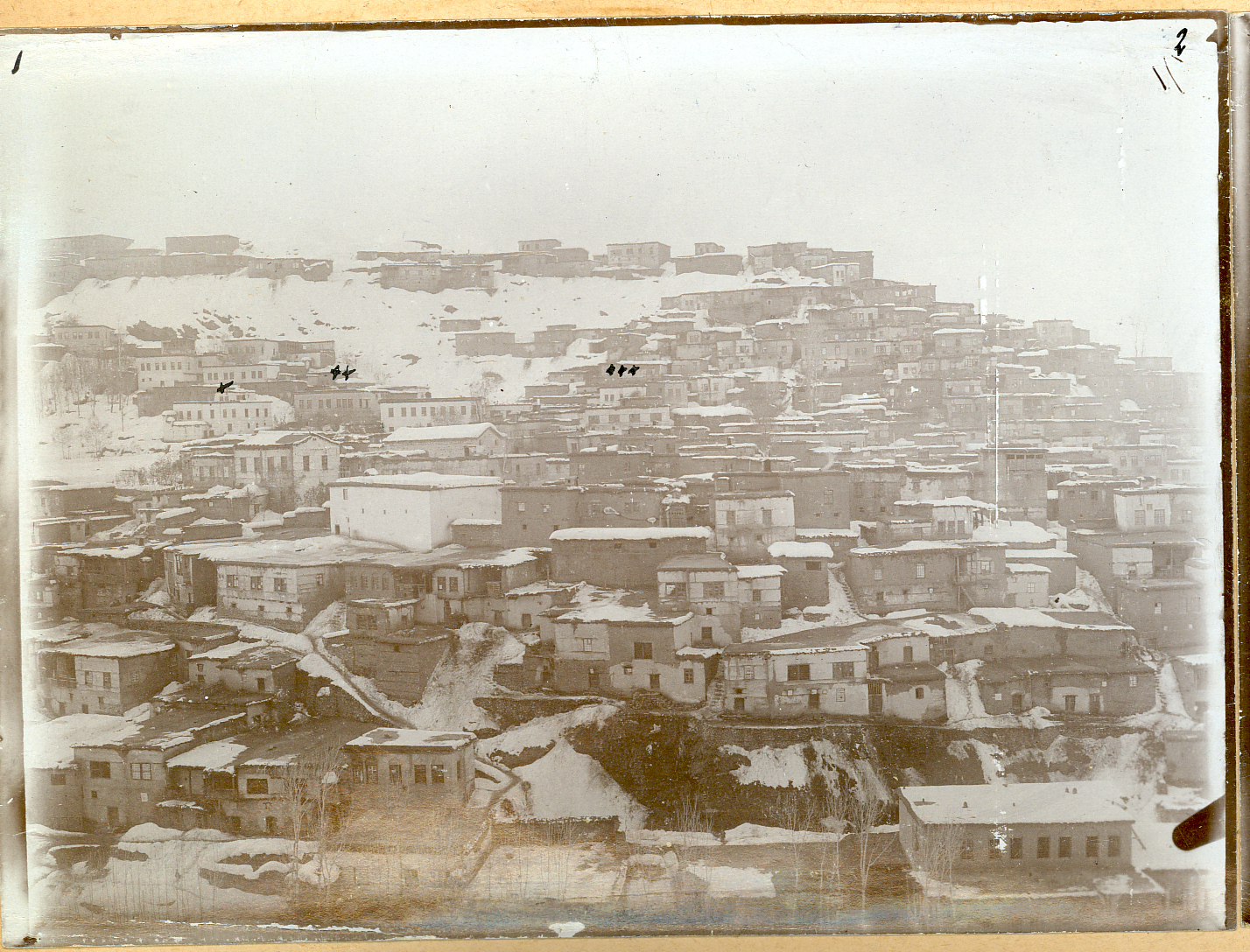
Panorama of Mush

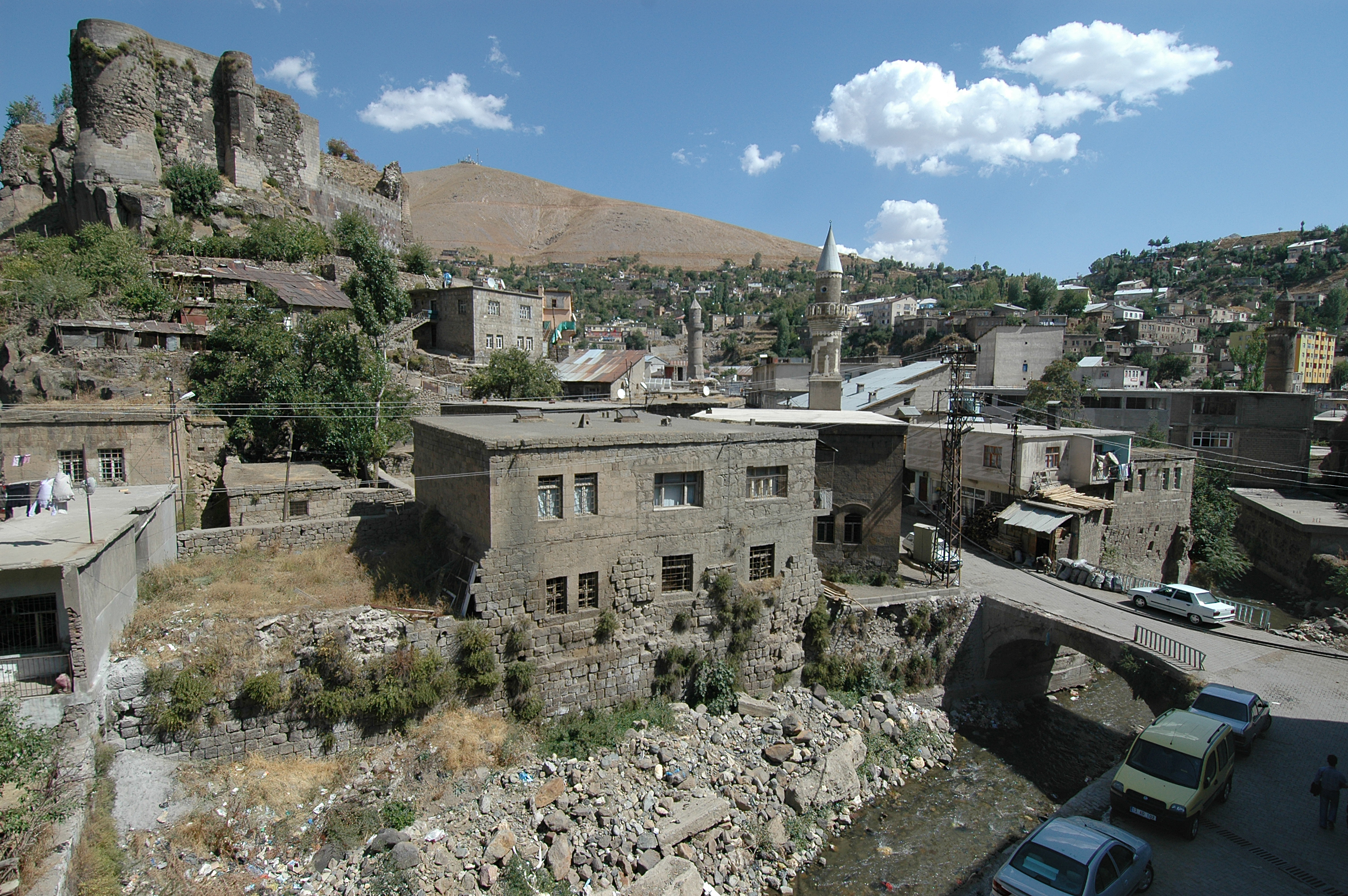
Old town of Bitlis

=== Sasun ===
Houses in the region of Sasun were simple, rectangular houses built into the local mountainous terrain. They usually consisted of one story, and were constructed from local stones. The walls were supported by four wooden pillars. The houses of poorer families usually consisted of one room with a central hearth. One part was used for human habitation, while the other was occupied by the family's animals. Richer families had separate living quarters, a wine cellar, a room for grain storage, a tonir room to bake lavash, a room for keeping animals, etc. Most houses only had two sources of light, a window next to the door, and an opening on the roof above the hearth.

Besides building regular houses, the princes and rich families of Sasun built three-story fortified tower houses called Koshks. Like standard houses, Koshks were constructed from local stones and mud. The Koshk only had one door as its entrance, located at the back of the structure. The first floor was used as a barn to keep large animals. A wooden ladder on the ground floor allowed one to ascend to the second floor, and from there the top floor. The second floor housed the hearth and main living quarters. The third floor, known as the Rosh, was covered on three sides, while the fourth was left open. In the summers, it served as the family's primary place of residence due to its cooler temperature, while during the winters it was used to store produce.

At the same time, Koshks were designed to act as places of refuge during the constant armed conflicts in the Sasun region. Loopholes were evenly arranged on all sides of the wall of the Rosh, which allowed the occupants to fire down on incoming assailants in the event of an enemy attack.

== See also ==
- Armenian architecture
- Vernacular architecture
