= Khot, Armenia =

Khot Խոտ
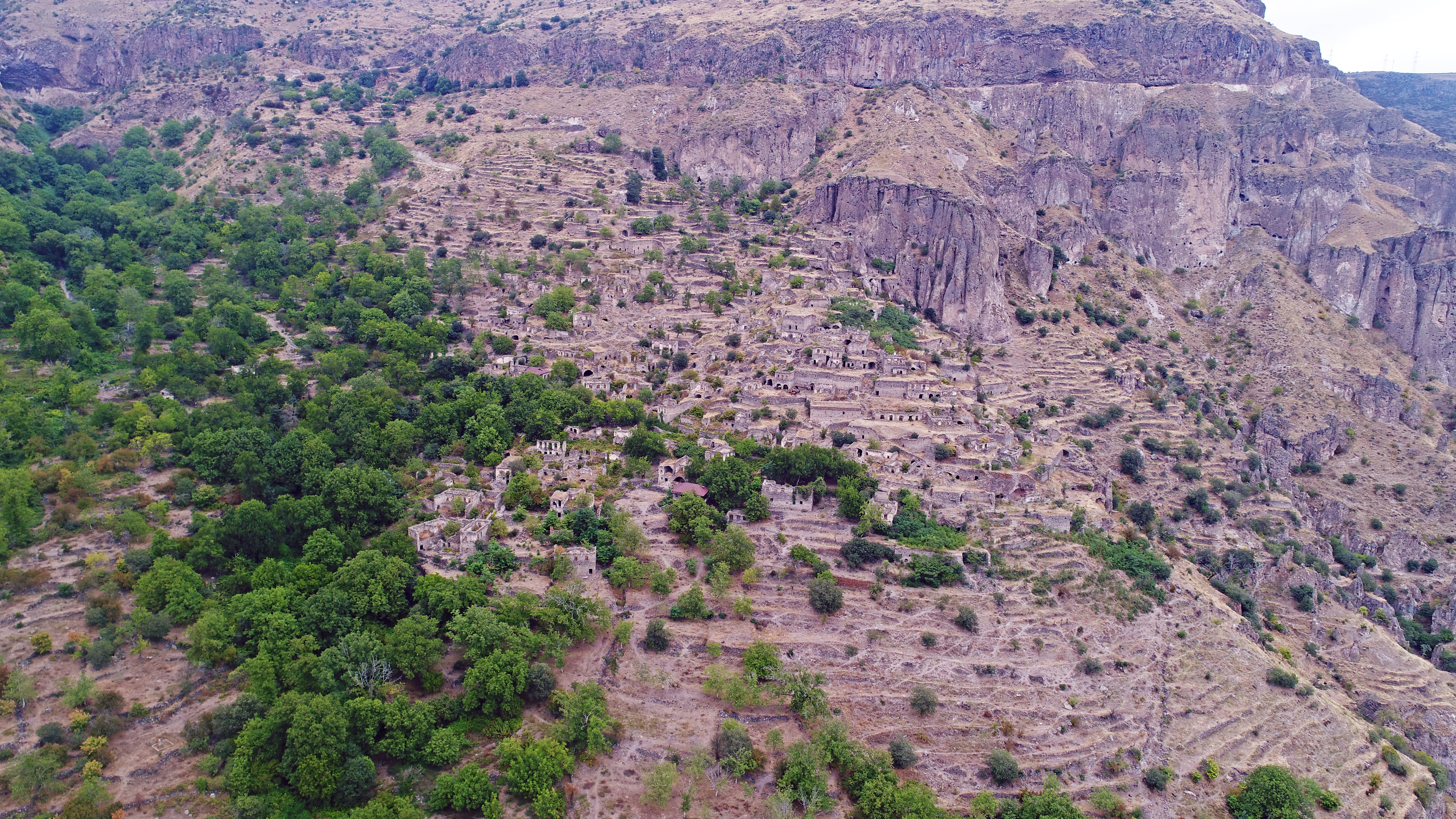
- View of Hin (Old) Khot

- Location within Armenia Location within Syunik Province
- Coordinates: 39°26′24″N 46°20′10″E
- Country: Armenia
- Province: Syunik
- Municipality: Tatev

Area
  - Total: 17.97 km^{2} (6.94 sq mi)

Population (2011)
  - Total: 942
  - Density: 52.4/km^{2} (136/sq mi)
- Time zone: UTC+4 (AMT)

Khot (Armenian: Խոտ) is a village in the Tatev Municipality of the Syunik Province in Armenia. It is located on the left side of the Vorotan river, 67 kilometers from the regional center of Kapan. On the cliffs below Khot are the ruins of Hin Khot (Old Khot), the previous location of the village until the 1970s.

The village was included under the same name in the Zangezur uezd within the Elizavetpol Governorate of Russian Empire.

During the Soviet years, Khot was a part of the Zangezur province of the Armenian SSR, and from 1930, it was part of the Goris region. Since 1995, the village has been part of the Syunik province of RA, since 2015 it is part of the enlarged Tatev Municipality.

== Toponymy ==
The village was previously known as Khotavan, from Khot + avan (town). The name of the settlement is directly from the Armenian word Khot meaning herbage/grass. According to Heinrich Hübschmann, this is in reference to the rich gardens surrounding old Khot named Khotaget, Khot (grass) + get (river).

== History ==
Khot was first mentioned as a town within the Haband gavar (county) of the Syunik province during the time of the Kingdom of Armenia. In the 11th century, it was mentioned by the Armenian historian Stepanos Orbelian as a tax-paying settlement under the jurisdiction of the Tatev monastery. In 1205, prince Dlen, the son of Khazbak, donated the village of Khot and the large garden of Khotaget to the Tatev monastery. However, it was later taken away from Tatev until 1274, when the prince Tarsayich Orbelian returned it to the monastery. In the medieval period, the castle of Khanapa was located here and the ruins can still be seen today. The oldest monastery of the village was Khoti Vank built in the 5th-6th centuries. The Armenian priest and historian Ghevond Alishan referred to it as St. Astvatsatsin. The ruins of the Red Church of the village from the 12th century are preserved in the old cemetery. Traditionally, the bells of this church were known for their powerful sound which is where the name Zangezur, from Armenian zang (bell), is believed to have originated. In the 18th century, the Mrgadzori Khach church was built in the village. According to legend, Mrgadzori Khach was built by an Armenian woman who escaped the harem of the Persian Shah Abbas. By the 19th century, Russian general Yermolov mentions Khot as an Armenian village in the province of Karabakh, conquered from Qajar Iran during the Russo-Persian War (1804–1813).

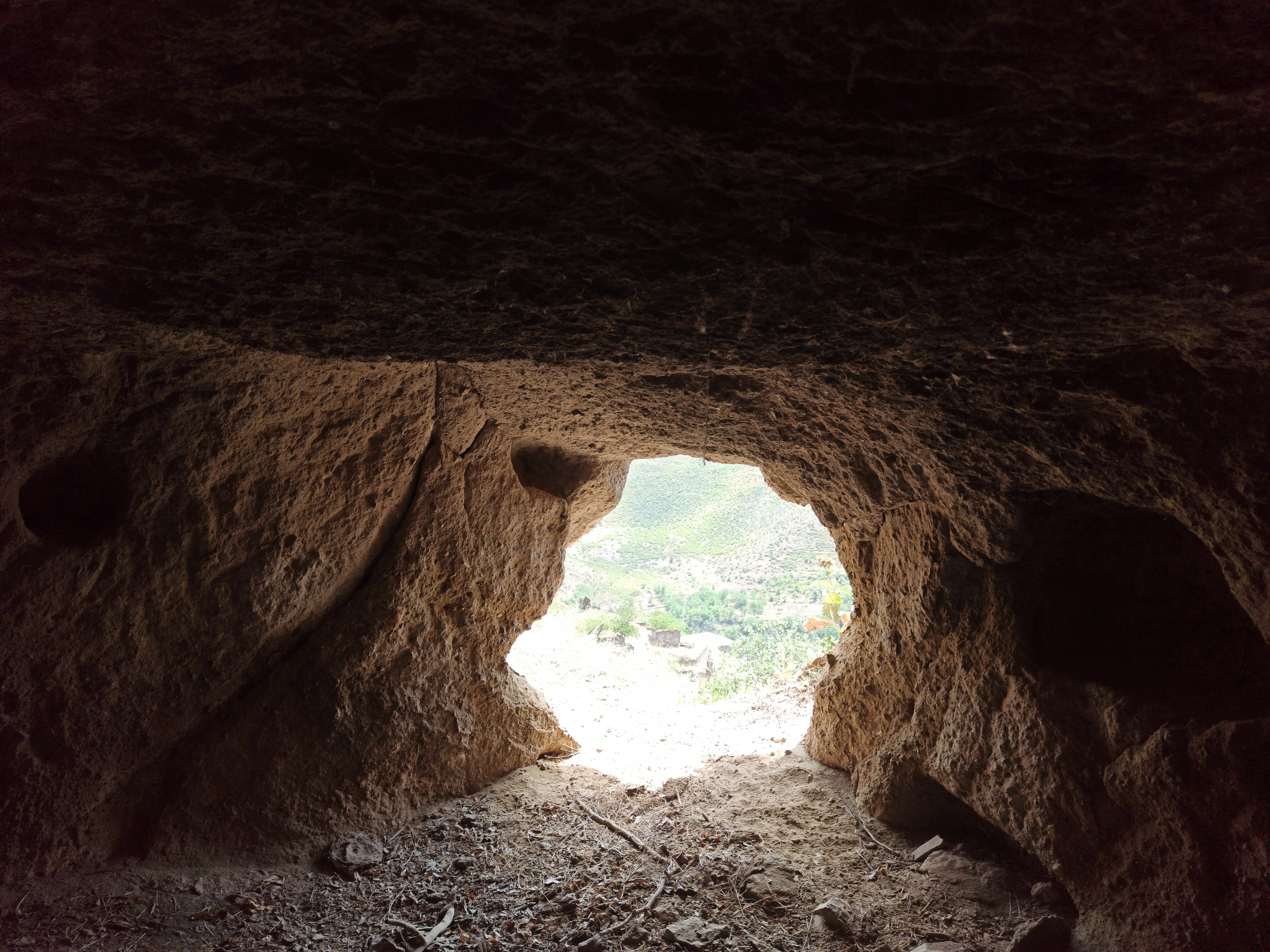
Cave-dwelling in Old Khot

During the Soviet period, Khot was located in the Goris region of the Armenian SSR. A new settlement was built on a plateau outside of the old city, it contained an 8-year school, medical center, newly planned streets, a cinema, and a library. The old city of Khot was abandoned in the 1960s-70s when its inhabitants were moved to higher ground closer to the main road and utility on flatter land. Ancient cave-dwellings have been preserved in the village and its surroundings.

== Demographics ==
=== Population ===
The Statistical Committee of Armenia reported its population as 1,079 in 2010, up from 890 at the 2001 census. In the 1823 survey of Karabakh, the population was reported to consist of 37 tax-paying households, all Armenian. According to the Caucasian Calendar in 1912, the population of the village in 1911 was 1,131 people, mostly Armenians. By 1914 it reached 1,240 people, also predominantly Armenians.

Historical population
| Year | Pop. | ±% p.a. |
|---|---|---|
| 1831 | 173 | — |
| 1873 | 739 | +3.52% |
| 1897 | 938 | +1.00% |
| 1926 | 788 | −0.60% |
| 1939 | 675 | −1.18% |
| 1959 | 600 | −0.59% |
| 1970 | 739 | +1.91% |
| 1979 | 830 | +1.30% |
| 1989 | 855 | +0.30% |
| 2001 | 890 | +0.33% |
| 2004 | 961 | +2.59% |

== Gallery ==
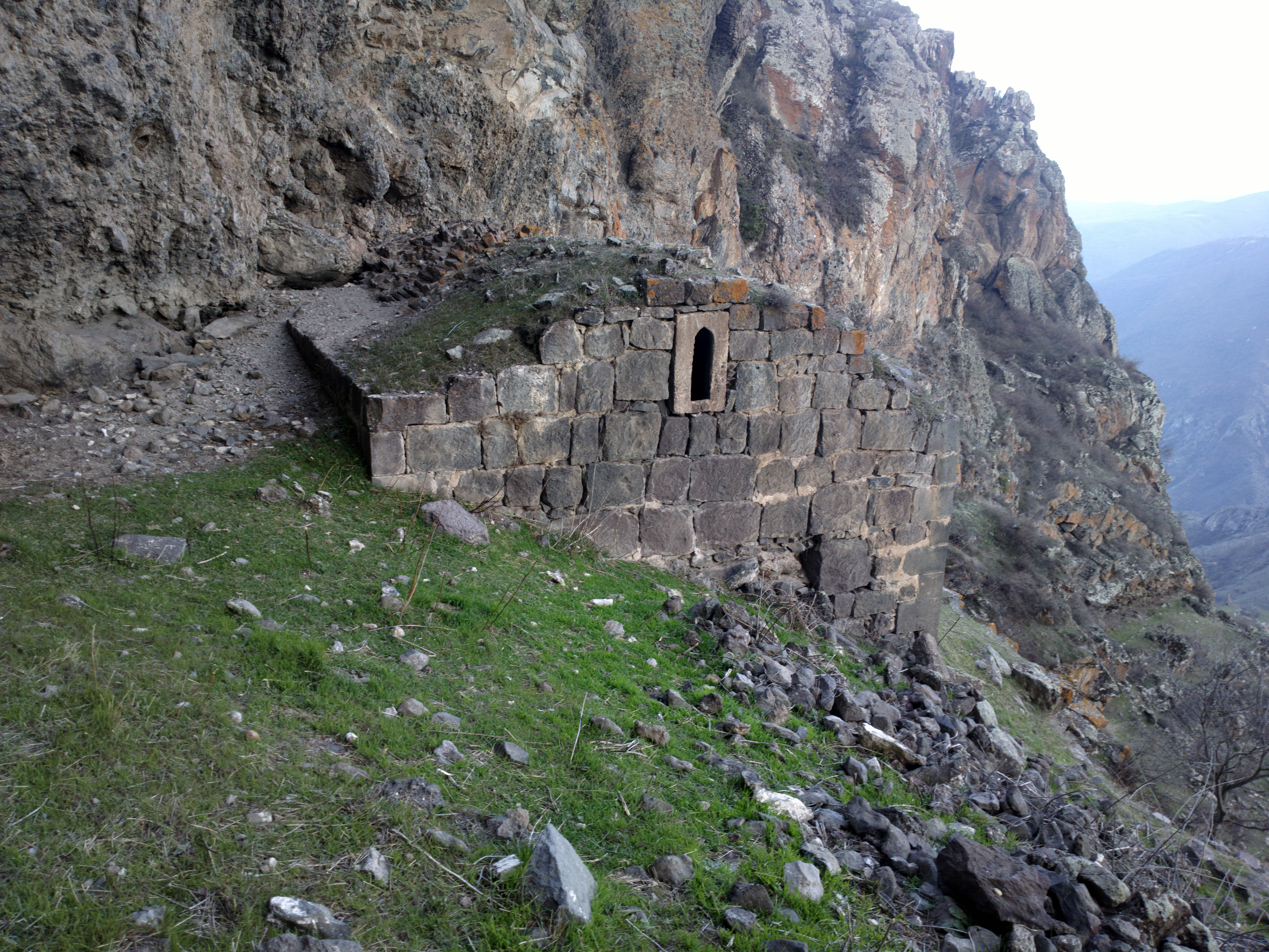
Mrgadzori khach church

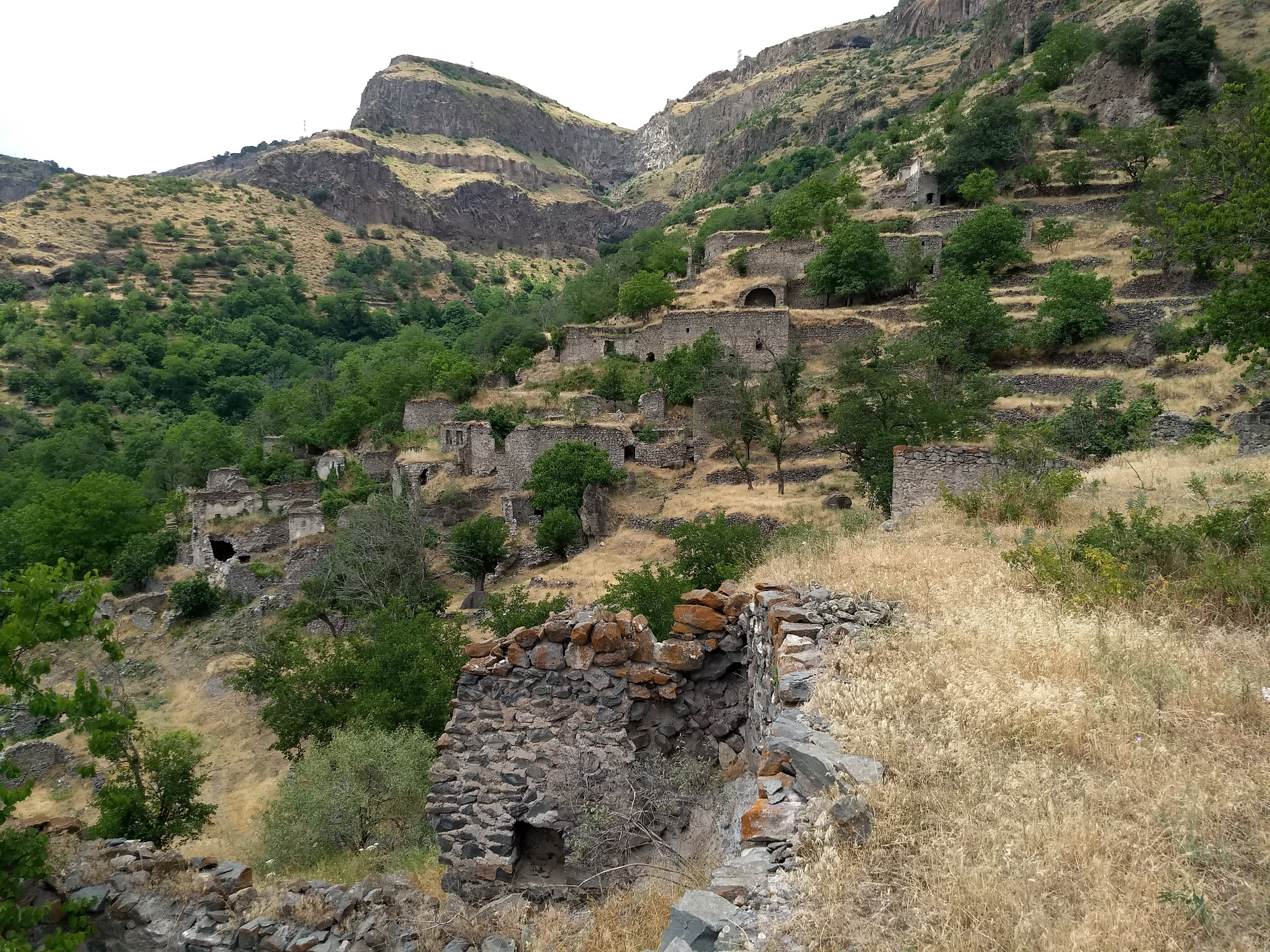
Ruins of Hin Khot

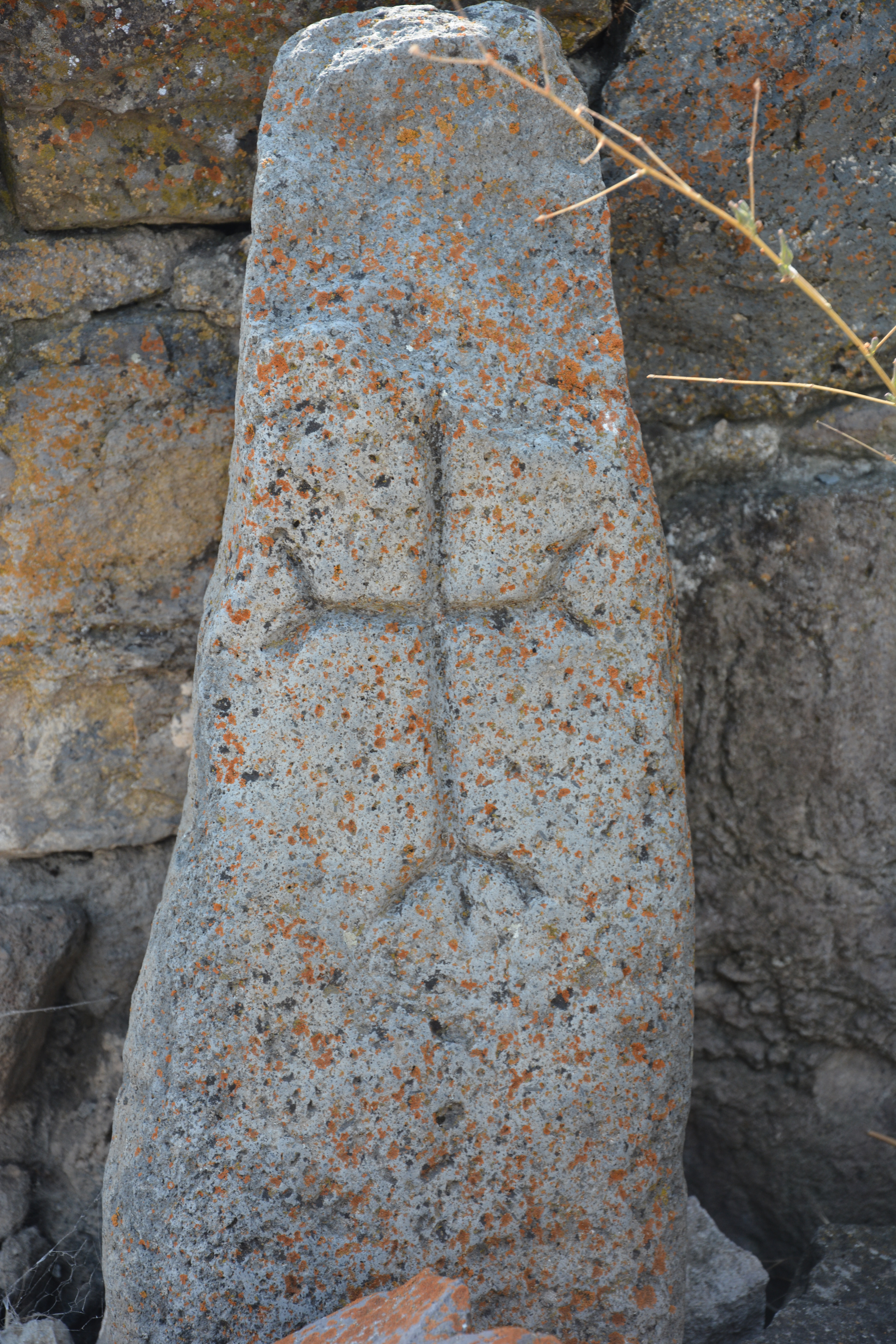
Khatchkar from 1409 in Khot

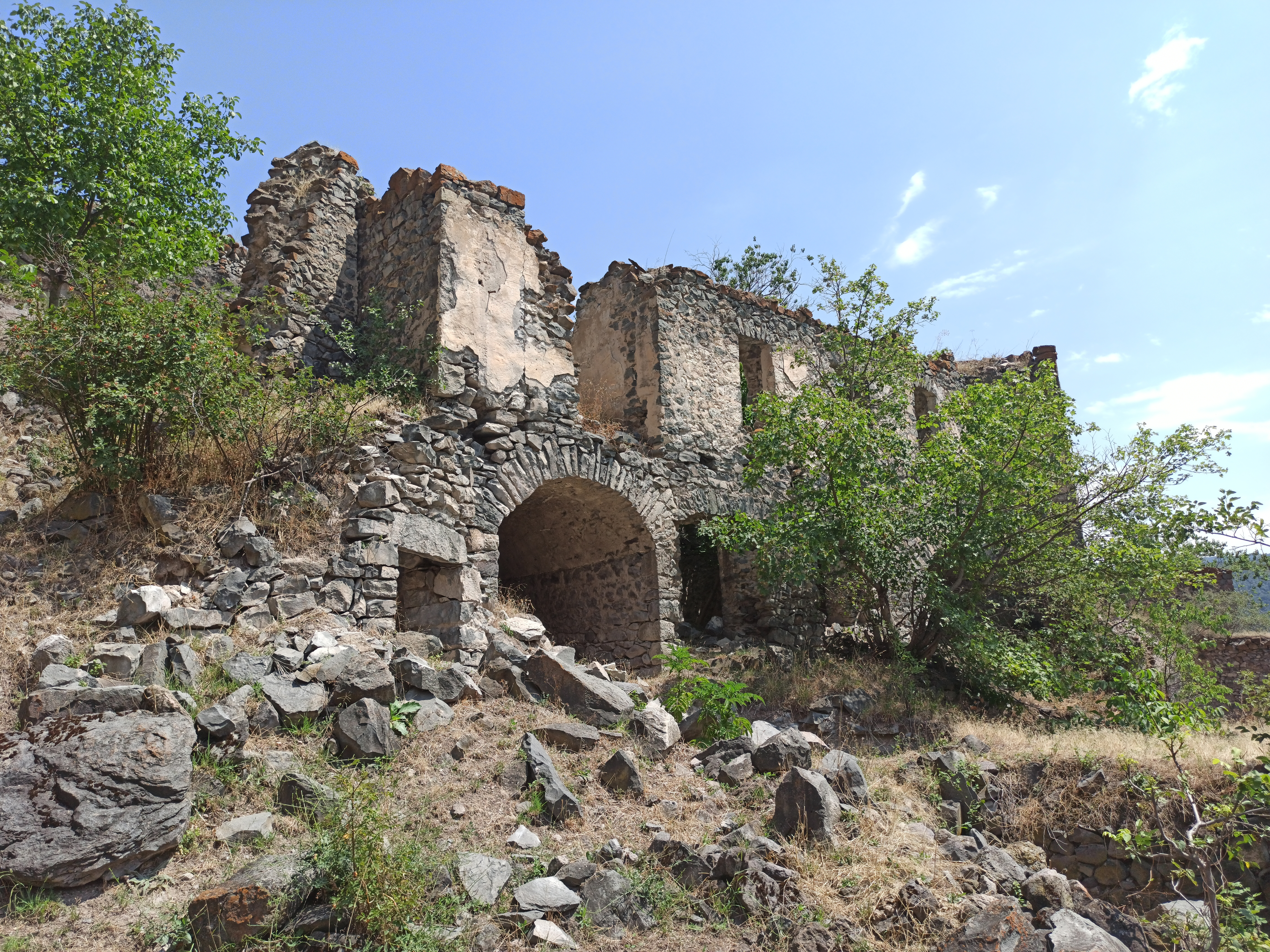
Hin Khot

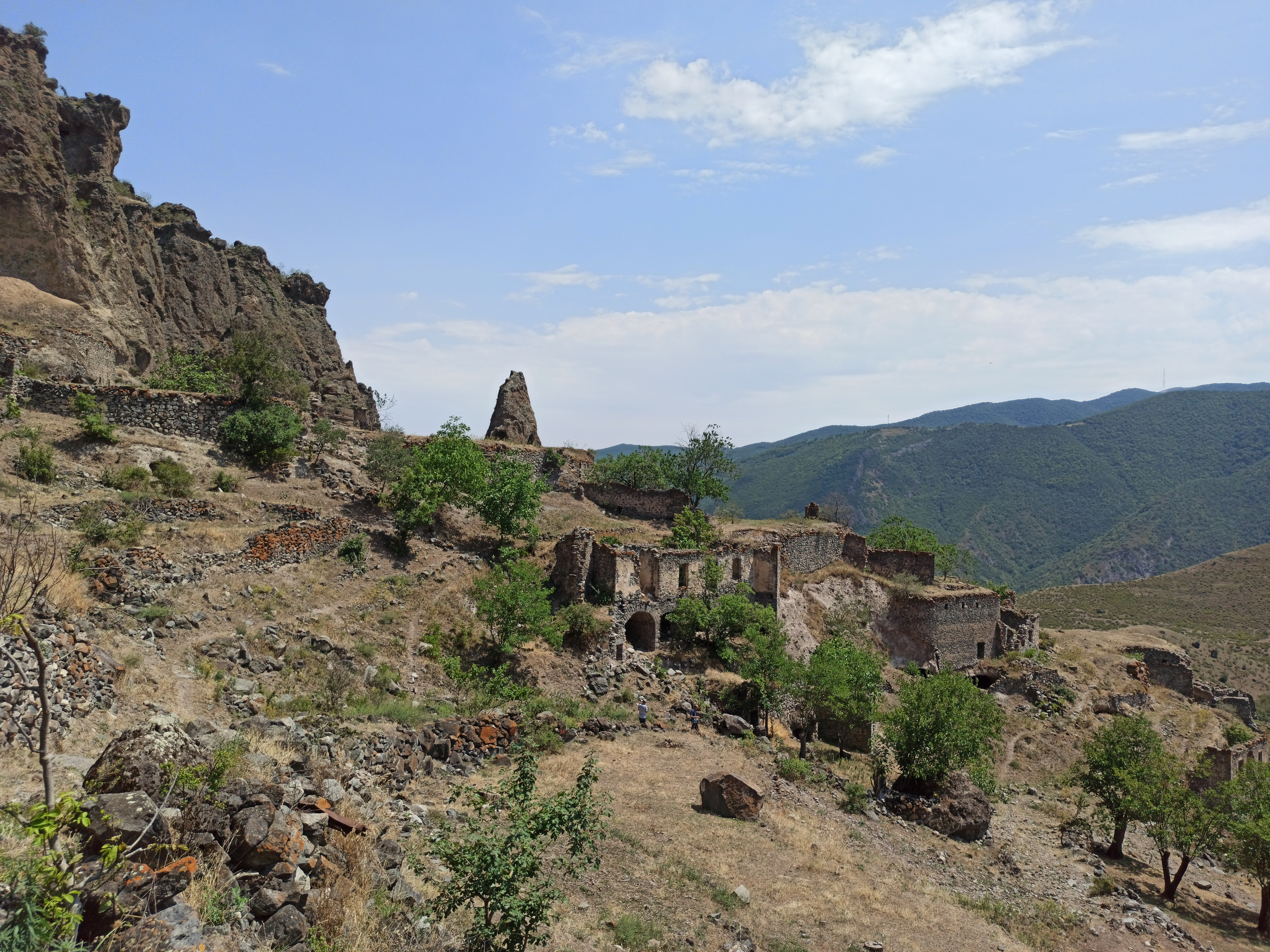

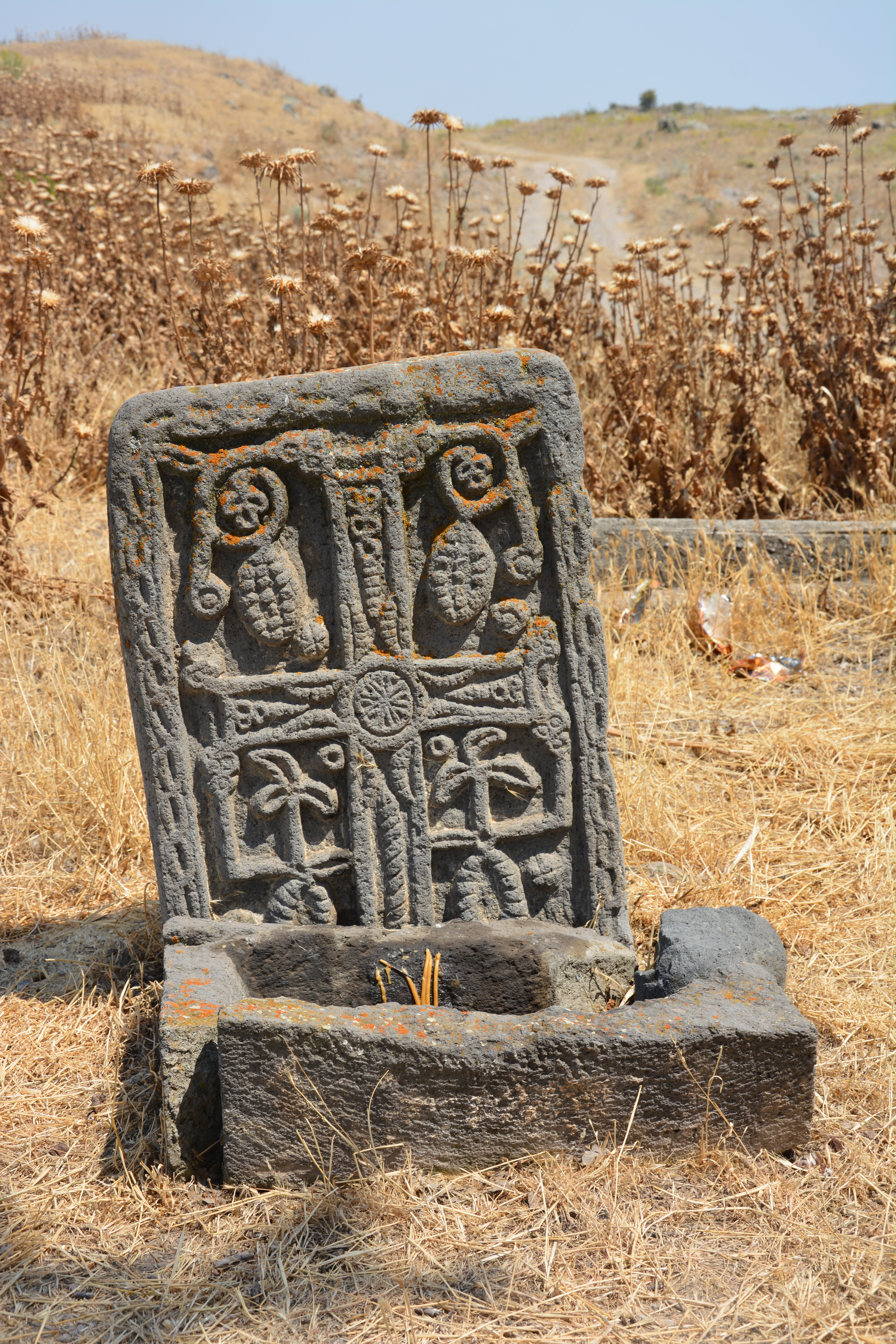
17th-18th century khachkar in Khot

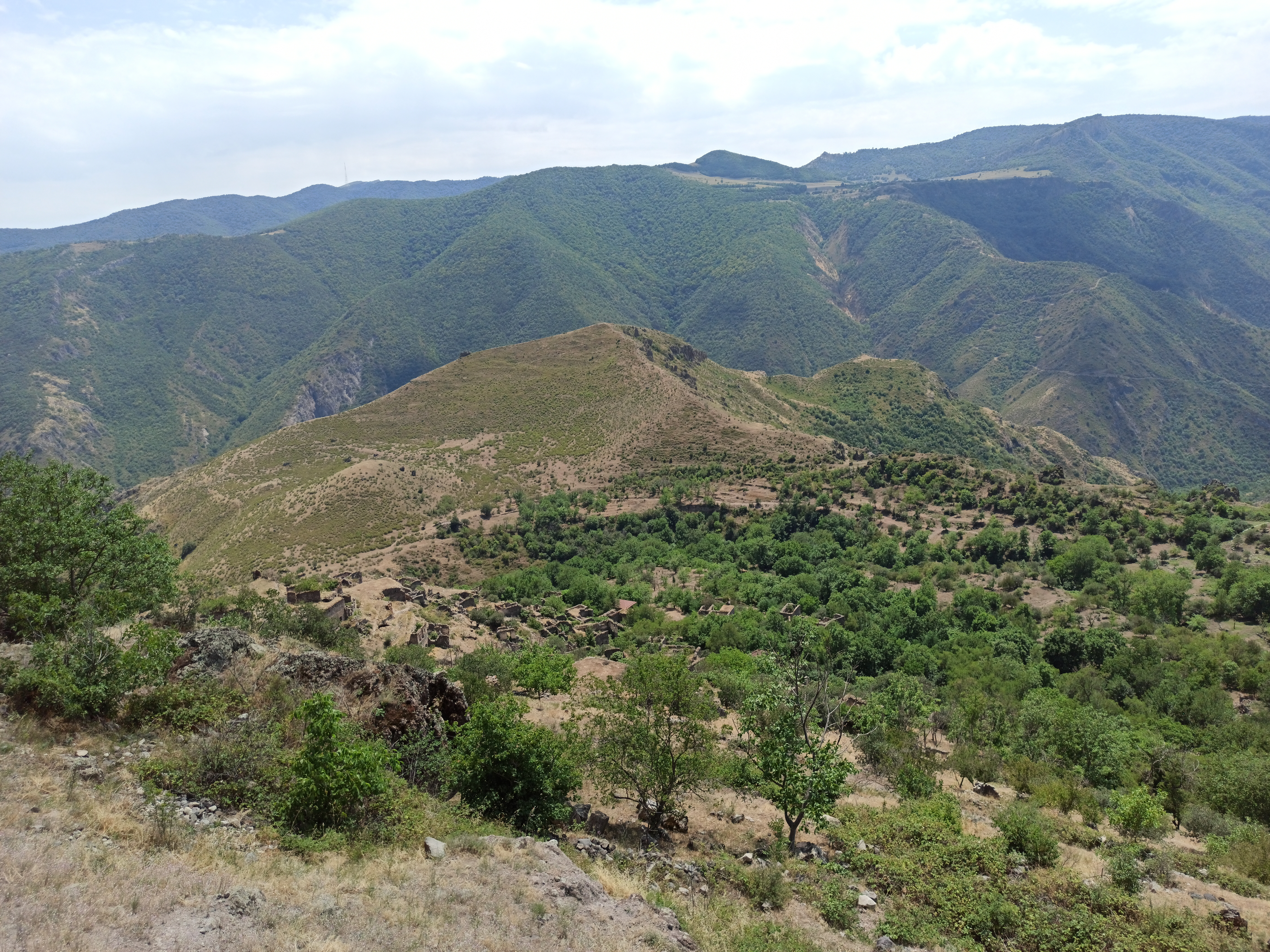
Scenery

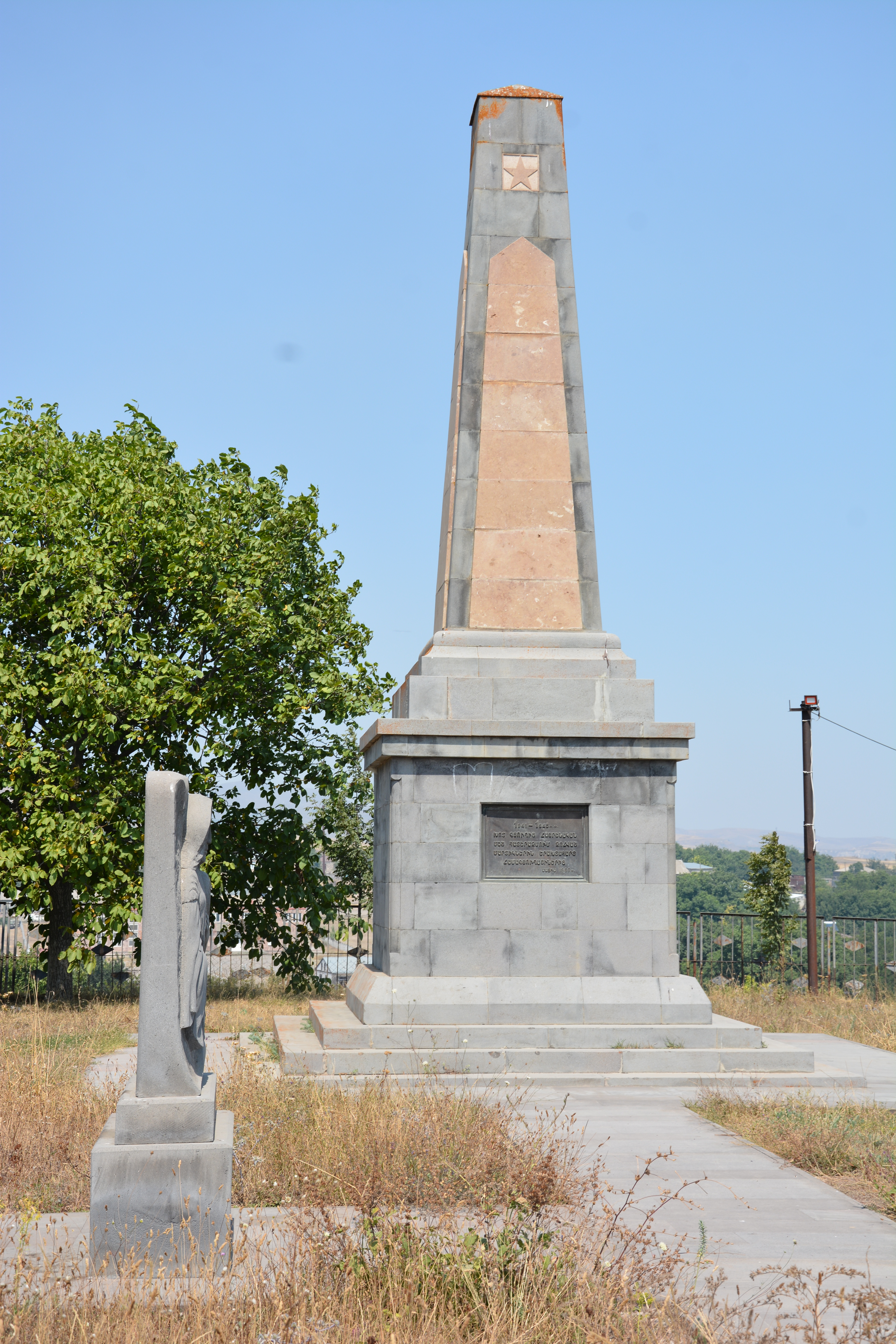
WWII monument in Khot

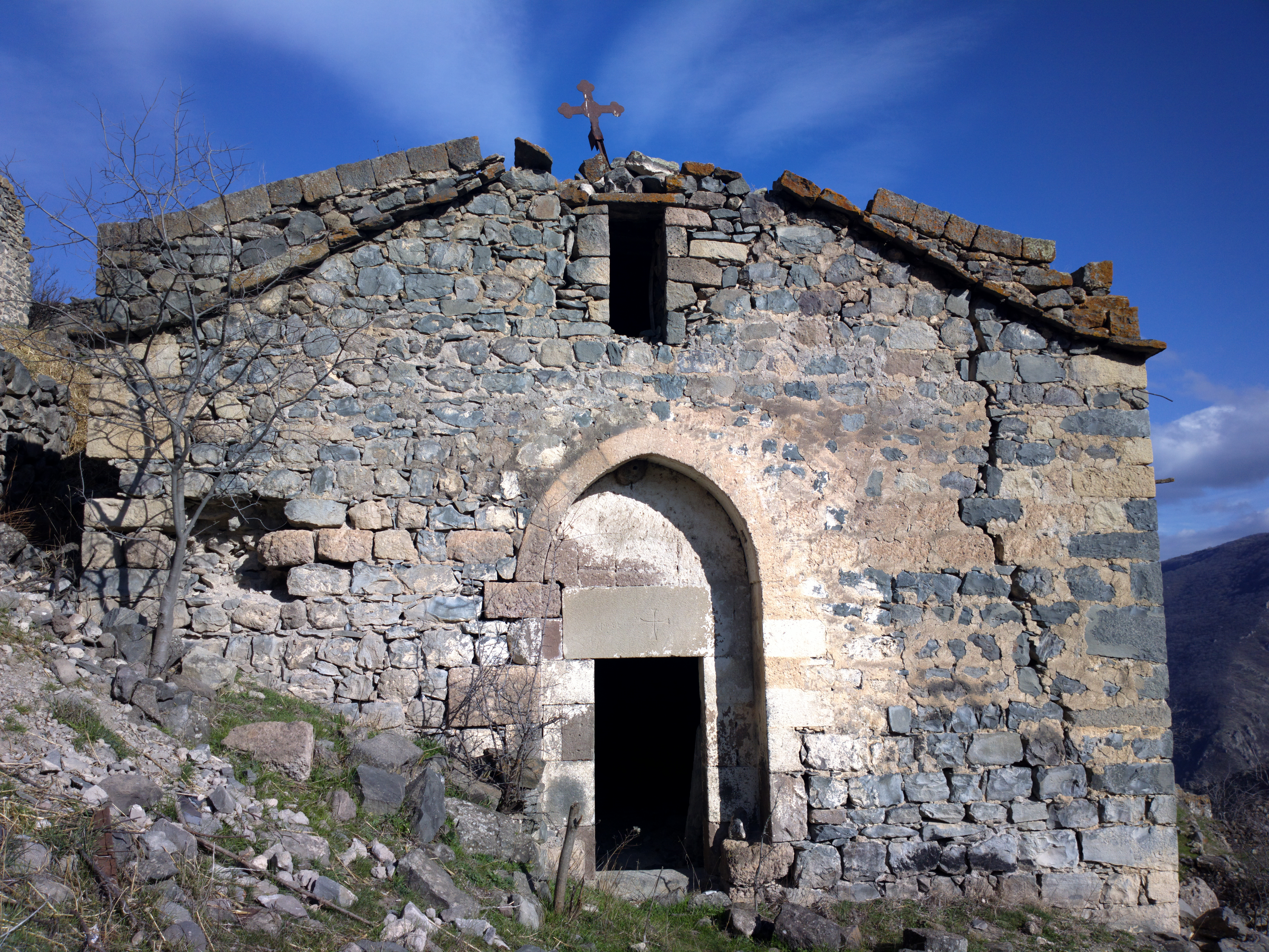
Hin Khot Church

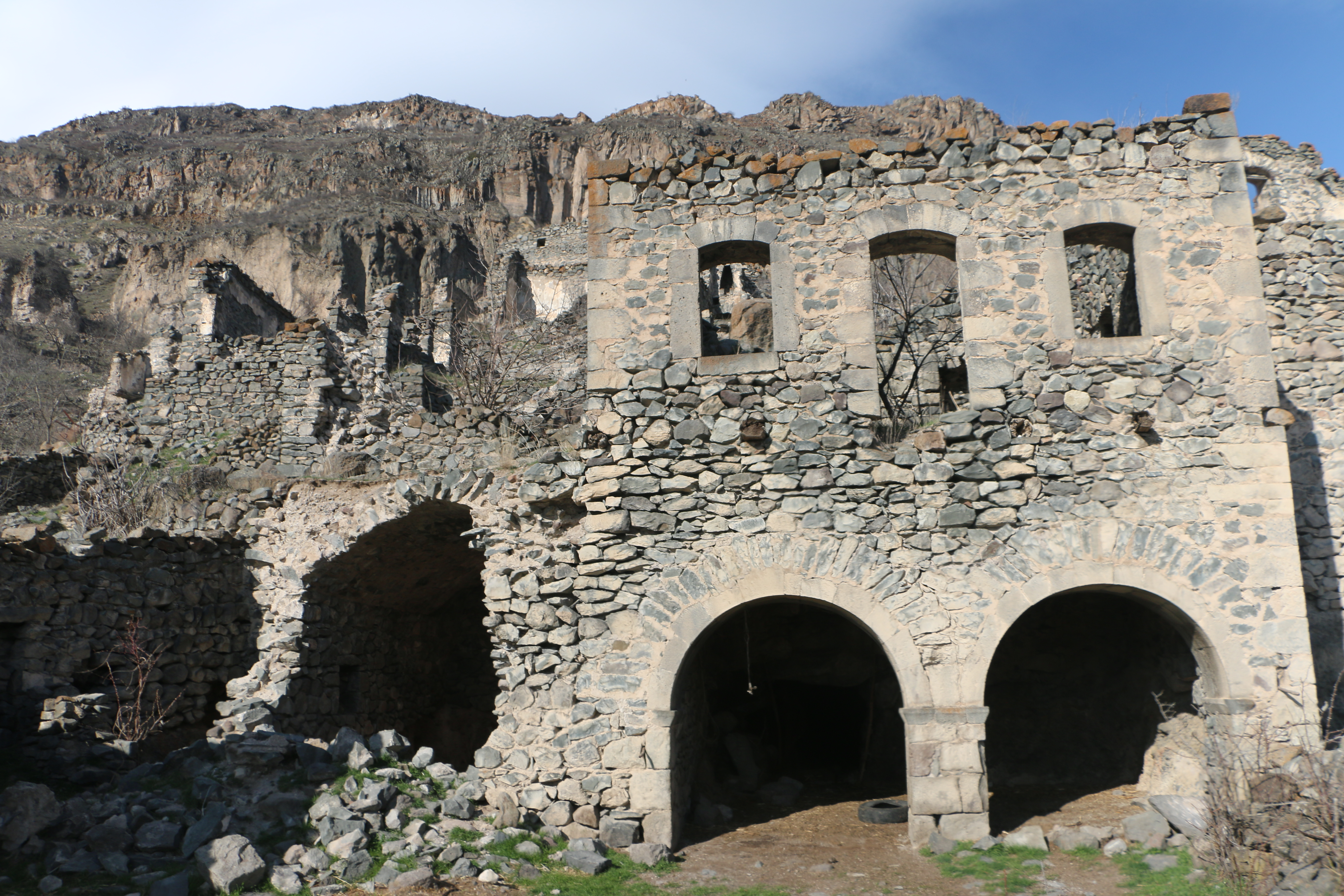
