= Tatev (disambiguation) =

Tatev refers to the Tatev monastery (Տաթևի վանք)

Tatev may also refer to:

- Tatev (village) (Տաթև) is a village and rural community in the Syunik Province of Armenia, home to the Tatev monastery
- Wings of Tatev (Տաթևի թևեր. Tatevi tever) cableway between Halidzor and the Tatev monastery
- Tatev Hydroelectric Power Station near the village of Tatev

People

- Tatev Abrahamyan (1988) Armenian born U.S. women's chess player
- Tatev Chakhian, Armenian poet, artist, editor and translator
- Gregory of Tatev, Armenian philosopher, theologian and a saint in the Armenian Apostolic Church
