= Saint Minas church of Halidzor =

Apostolic church in Armenia

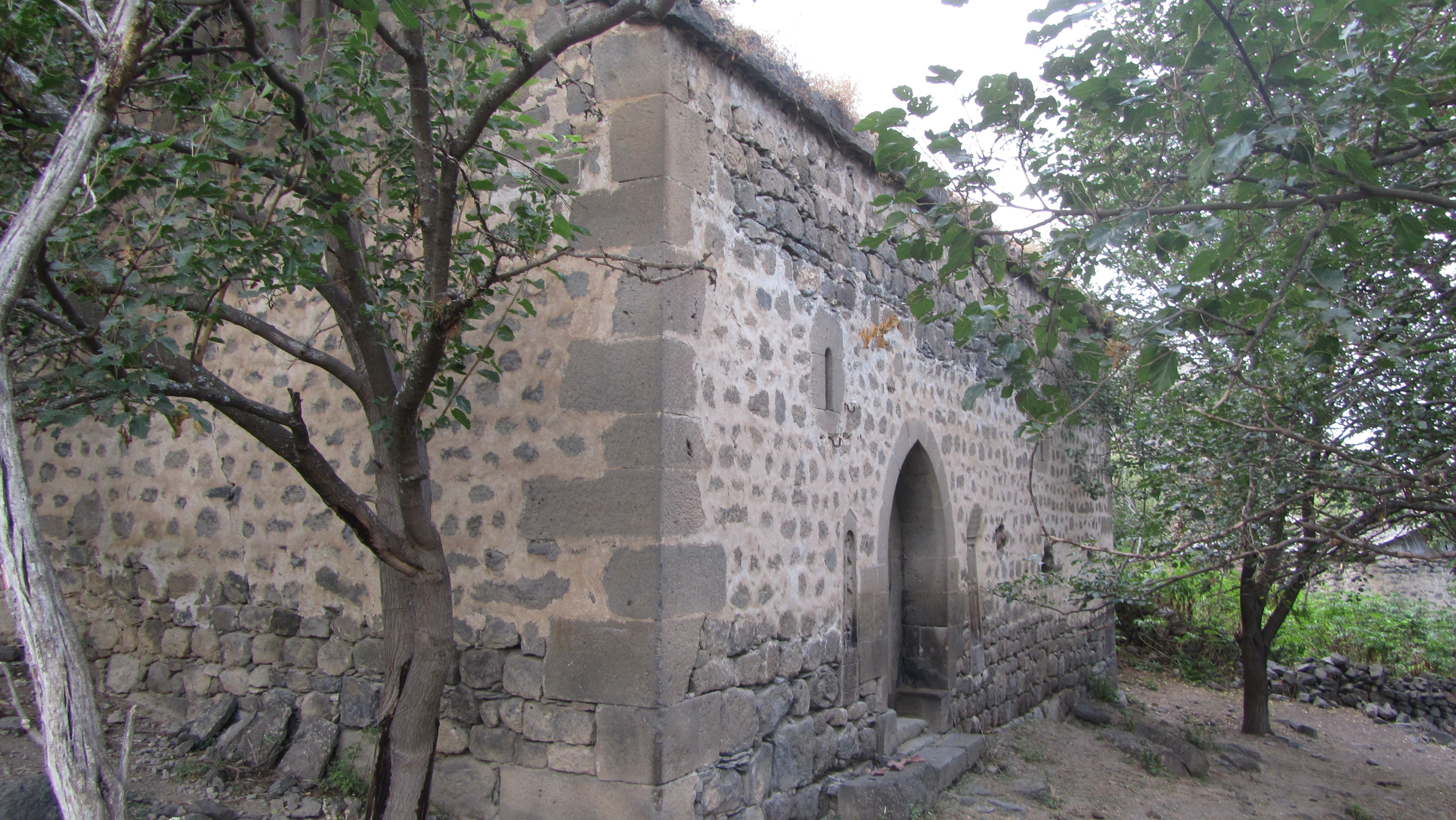
- st Minas church of Halidzor
- Location: Halidzor, Synik province, Armenia
- Country: Armenia
- Religious institute: Armenian Apostolic church

History
- Founded: 1611

Architecture
- Functional status: defunct
- Style: a one-nave hall with two storage rooms next to the altar

St Minas (Armenian: սուրբ Մինաս) is a 17th-century Armenian Apostolic Christian church located on the left bank of Vorotan river 3 km to the South-West the village of Halidzor, in the center of the Old Halidzor village in the Syunik Province in southeastern Armenia.

== History ==
According to the inscription on the façade above the entrance, the church was built in 1611. It is a one-nave hall with two storage rooms next to the altar. In Middle Ages, life in Armenian settlements was built around the church. The old village of Halidzor had existed since 9th century while the churches round the area were either defunct or far from the village. Therefore with the contributions and financial support of the residents of Halidzor st. Minas church was built on a small flat area in the central part of the village. Together with the settlement the church belonged to Tatev monastery by the end of 19th century.

During the Soviet period, St. Minas served as a warehouse for agricultural products. Nowadays the church still stands despite being defunct. It is included in the State List of Immovable Monuments of History and Culture of Syunik province of the Republic of Armenia.

== See also ==
- Halidzor
- Tatev municipality
- Tatev monastery
- Shinuhayr
- Khot
- The Great Hermitage of Tatev
