= Halidzor =

Halidzor Հալիձոր
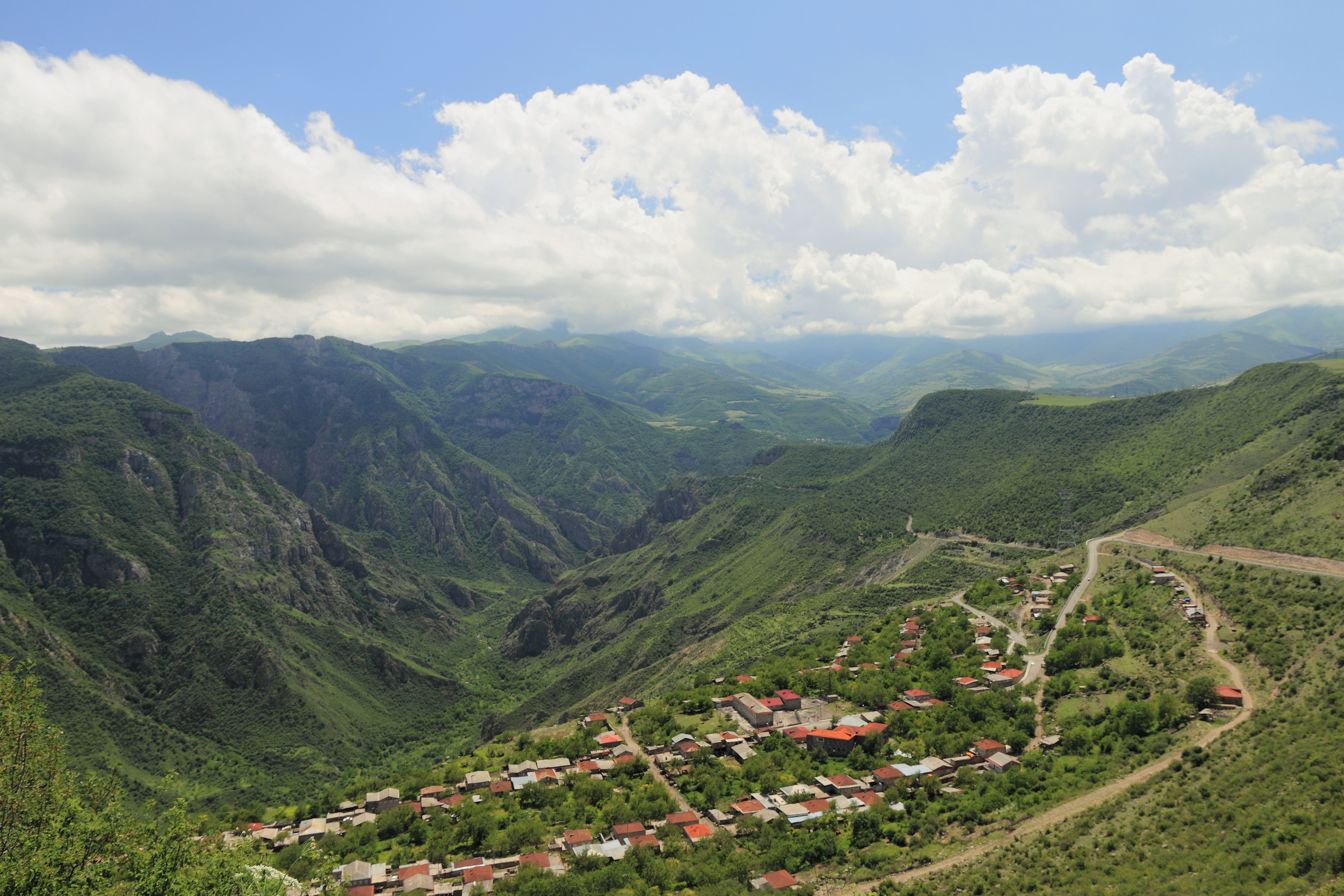
- Village view from Wings of Tatev

- Location within Armenia Location within Syunik Province
- Coordinates: 39°24′37″N 46°17′43″E
- Country: Armenia
- Province: Syunik
- Municipality: Tatev

Population (2011)
  - Total: 551
- Time zone: UTC+4 (AMT)

Halidzor (Armenian: Հալիձոր) is a village in the Tatev Municipality of the Syunik Province in Armenia.

== Toponymy ==
The name "Halidzor" originates from the names of the settlements called Hale, Halis in Haband province.

== Geography ==
Geographically, Halidzor is located near the left bank of the Vorotan River, at an altitude of 1300-1350 m above sea level. The regional center of Syunik province - the city of Kapan, is 62 km away. The nearest town is Goris, which is 12 km to the southwest.

To the northeast of Halidzor is the village of Shinuhayr, to the South and East is the gorge of the Vorotan river, to the East and northeast are cultivated fields.

== History ==
In the historical sources Halidzor is mentioned from the beginning of the 10th century. In his book of "History of Syunik" Stepanos Orbelyan ranks the settlement among medium-sized villages according to the tax it paid.

In the 10th century, Hamazaspuhi, the daughter of Prince Babden of Syunik, donated the village of Halidzor to the Tatev monastery, which was confirmed by Tarsayich Orbelyan in 1274. Halidzor was considered Tatev's property until the 19th century. It was also the site of the Battle of Halidzor which took place in 1727 when Armenian military commander Davit Bek along with his general Mkhitar Sparapet defeated the invading forces of the Ottoman Empire.

In St. Orbelyan and old records, the name of the village is written as HALE. Until the late Middle Ages, when writing Halidzor, the gorge around the village was understood (in Armenian: dzor= ձոր, means a gorge). Later it was written Hali-dzor and finally Halidzor.

=== Soviet period ===
During the Soviet years, Halidzor was part of the Zangezur province of the Armenian SSR, and from 1930, it was part of the Goris region.

The current village was built in 1966, a little far from the Old Halidzor, and until 1991 it was part of the Soviet economy of Harzhis.

=== Period of the Independent Republic of Armenia ===
In the early years of the independence of the Republic of Armenia, Halidzor was included in the Goris region, and since 1995 in the Syunik province, which includes the former Goris region. Since 2015, the settlement has been included in the enlarged Tatev Municipality of Syunik province.

== Historical heritage sites ==
The standing church of Saint Minas, built in 1611, is located in the old village of Halidzor. 2 km southwest of the village is the famous Harants Desert, in the vicinity are the church called "Khachin Khut", the "Poghos-Petros" chapel, a number of old settlements: "Halidzor", "Karmir", "Haykashen", "Haykatap", Hale, Old Shenategh (Old Settlement), as well as the cemetery with many khachkars. On the left bank of Vorotan, in the gardens, there is a preserved inscription erected on a rock in 1265. Harsnadzor observation point is one of the most visited historical and cultural monuments of Halidzor.

== Demographics ==
The village had 707 inhabitants in 2010, up from 602 in 2001.

== Economy and culture ==
The population is engaged in farming, gardening, animal husbandry and beekeeping.

== Gallery ==
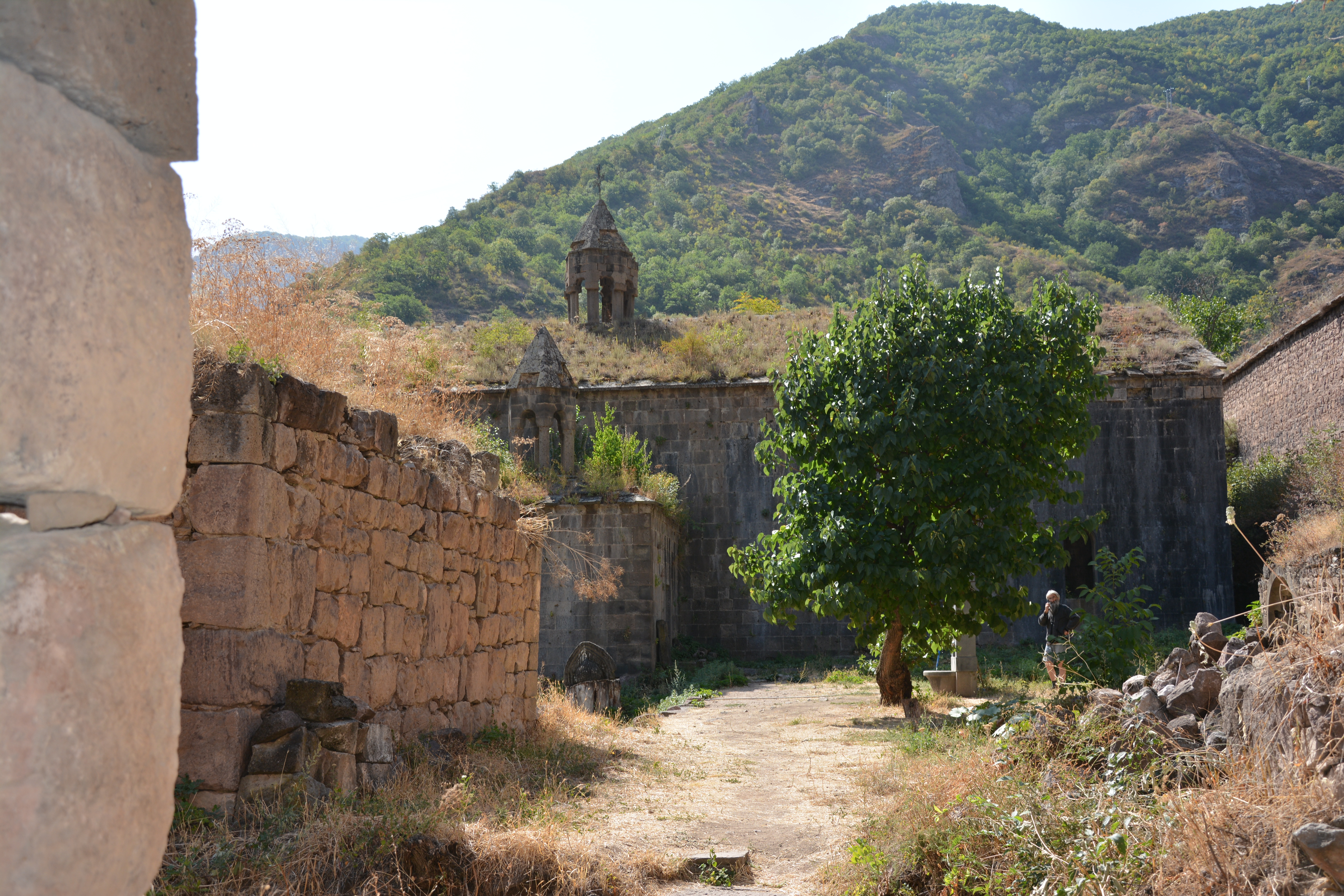
Syunyats Mets Anapat

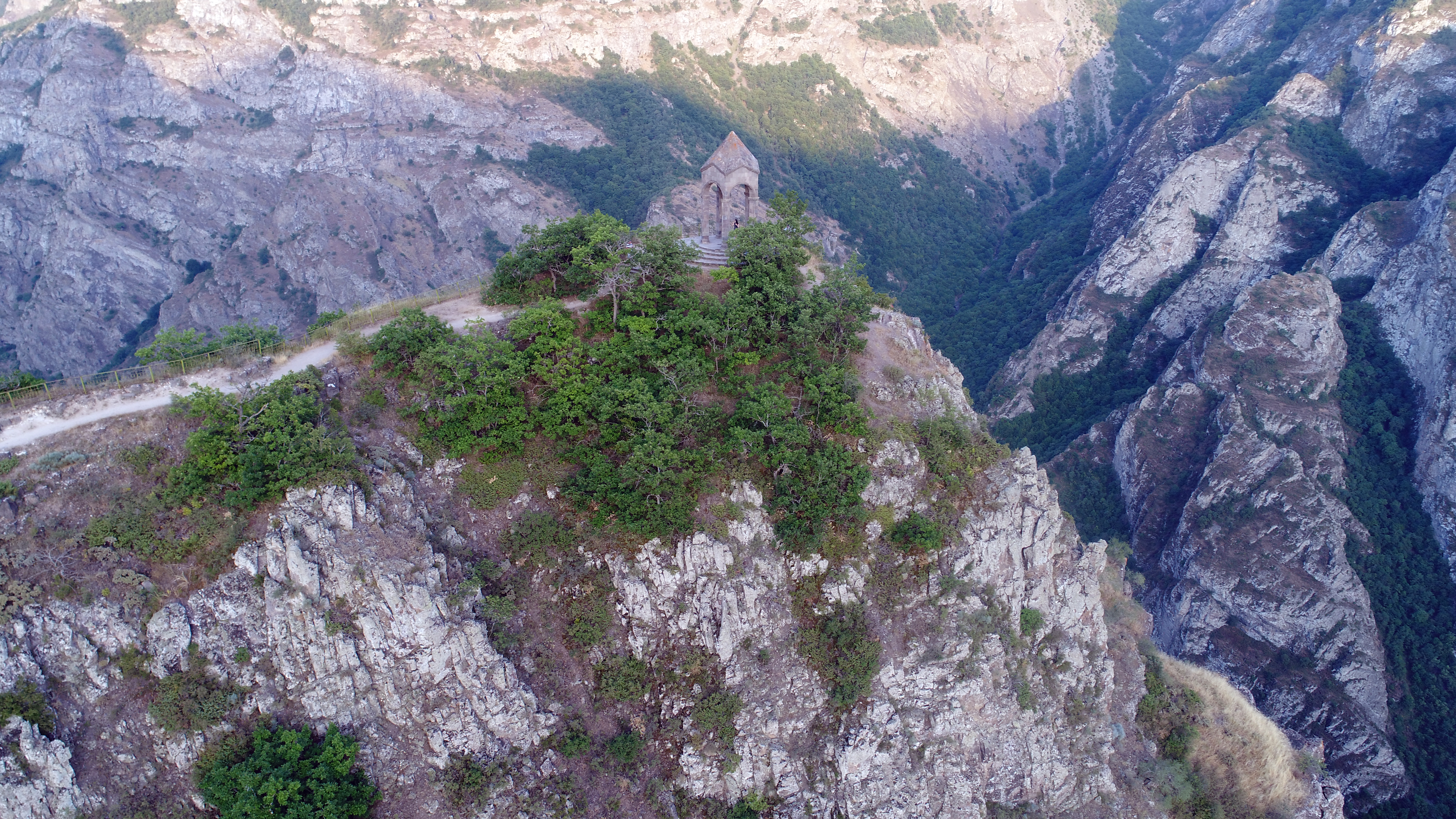
Bell tower-chapel in Halidzor

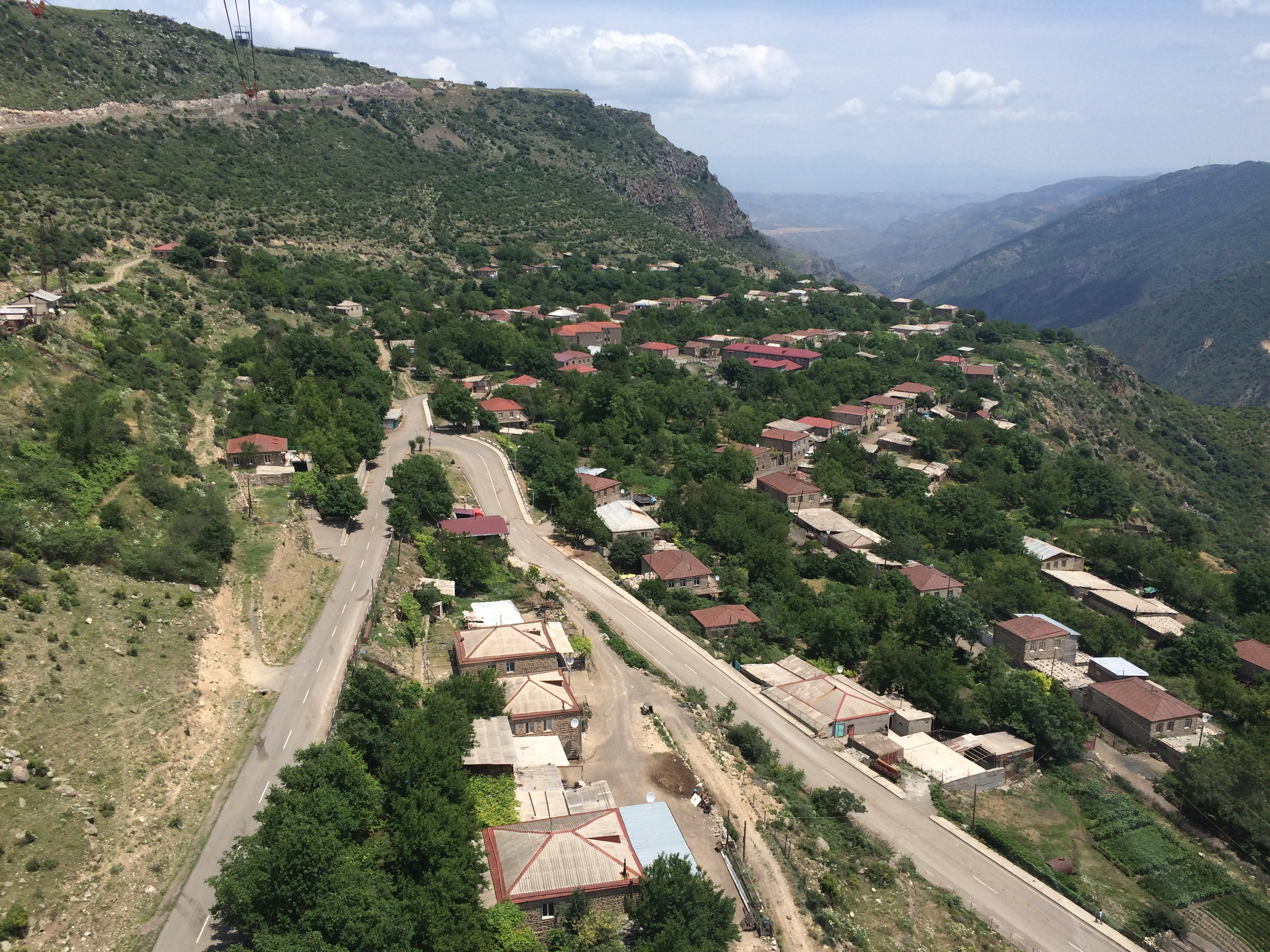
View of the village

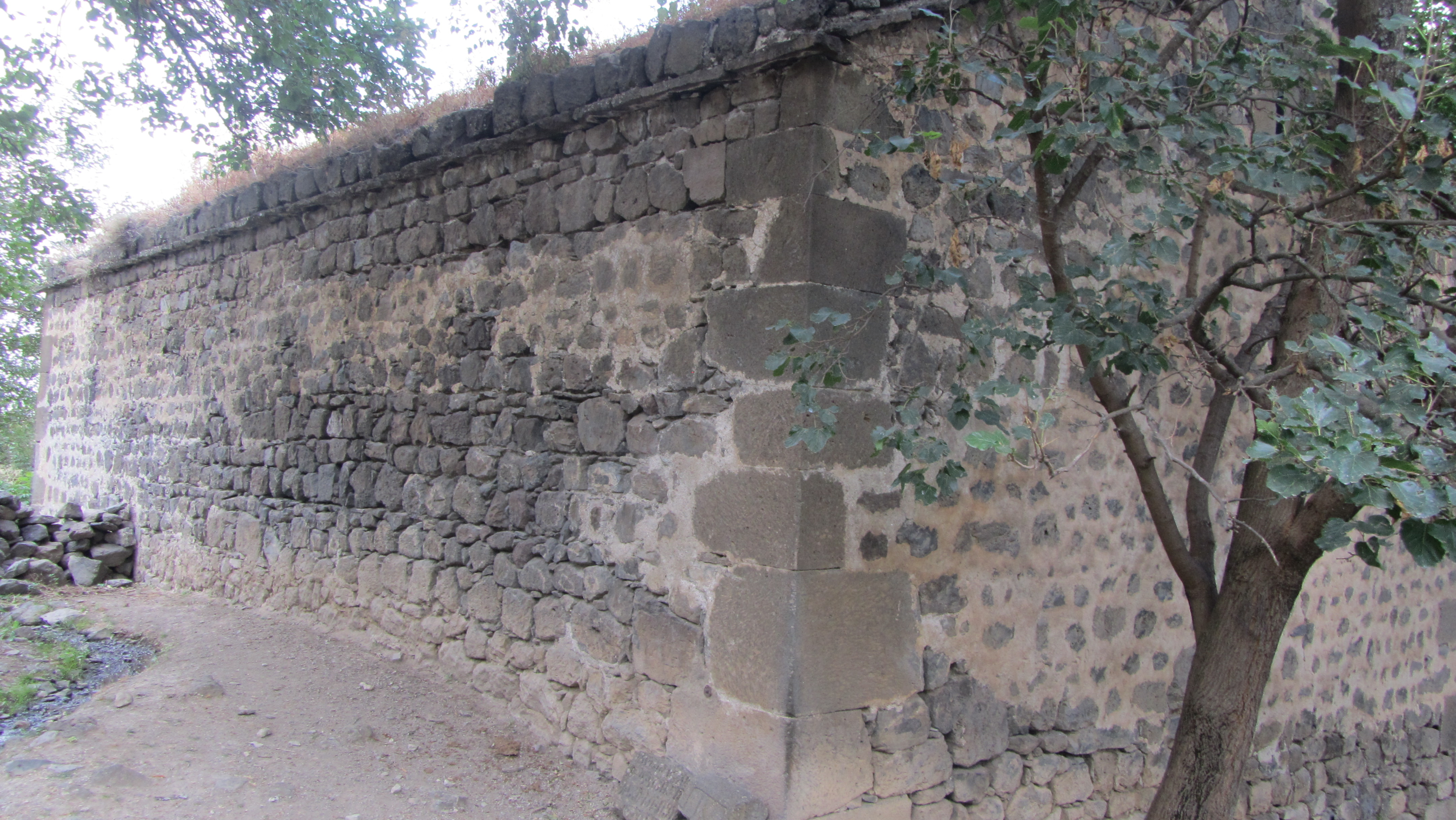
Saint Minas Church

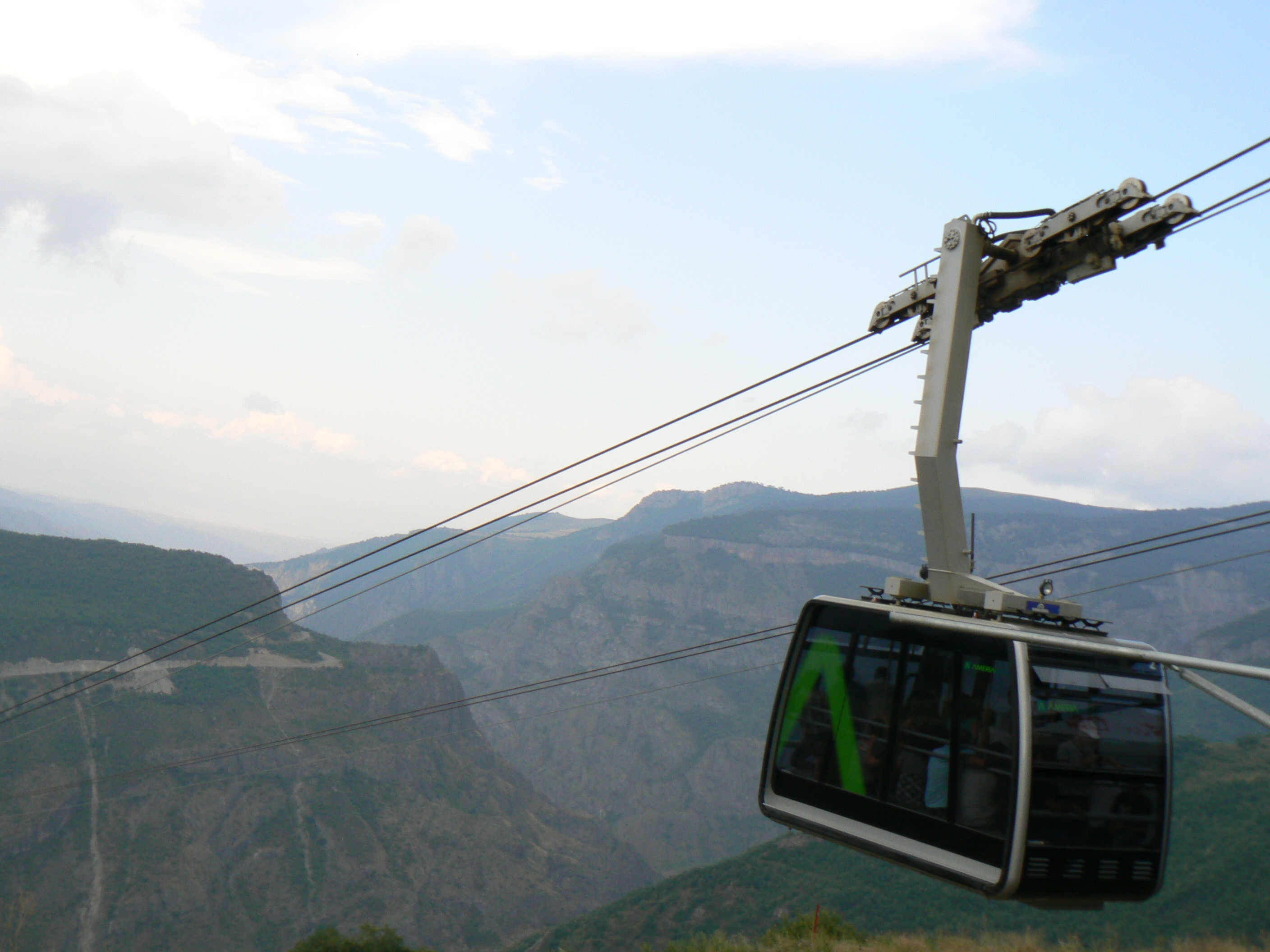
Wings of Tatev Tram

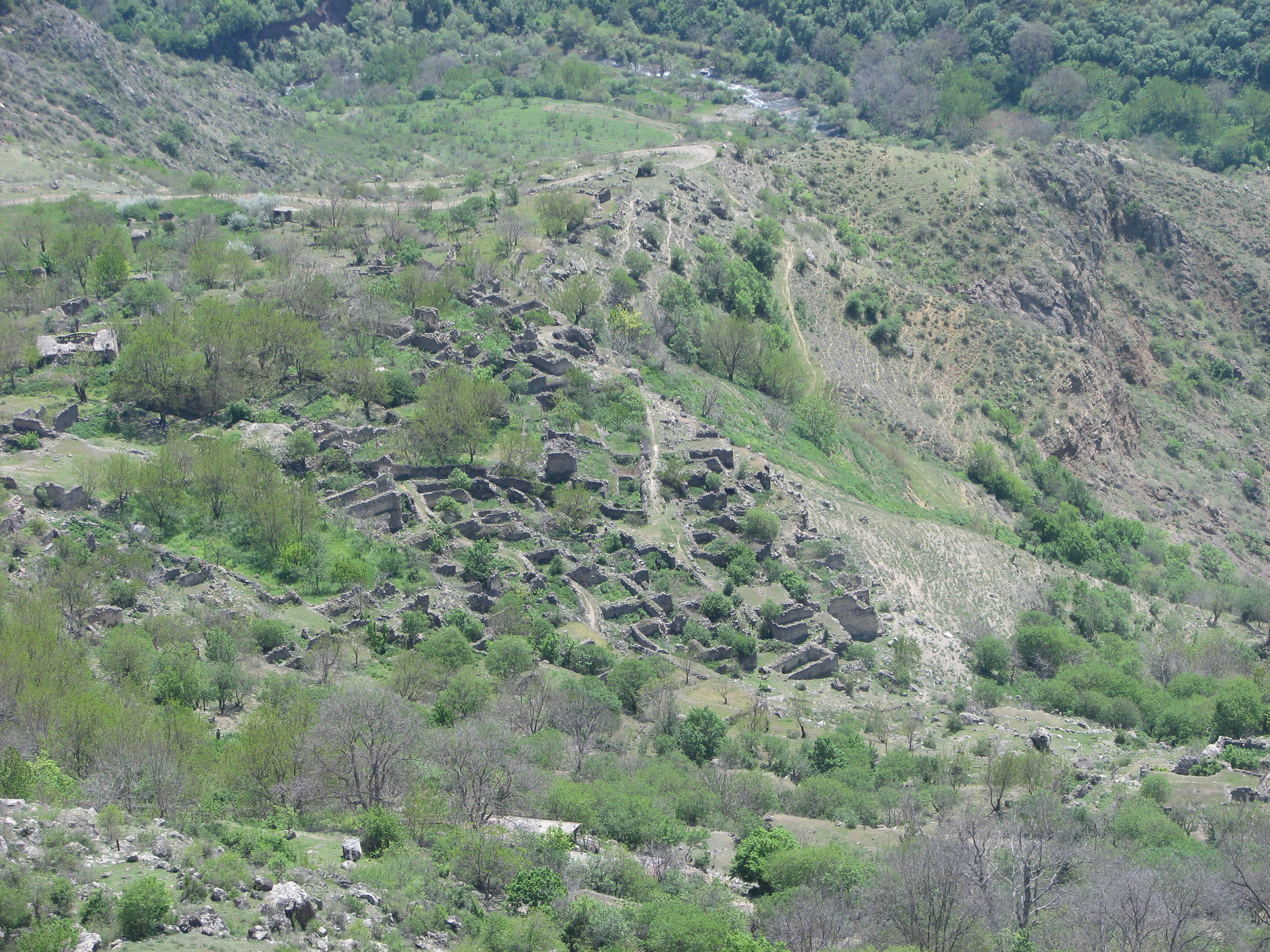
The remains of the old Halidzor settlement

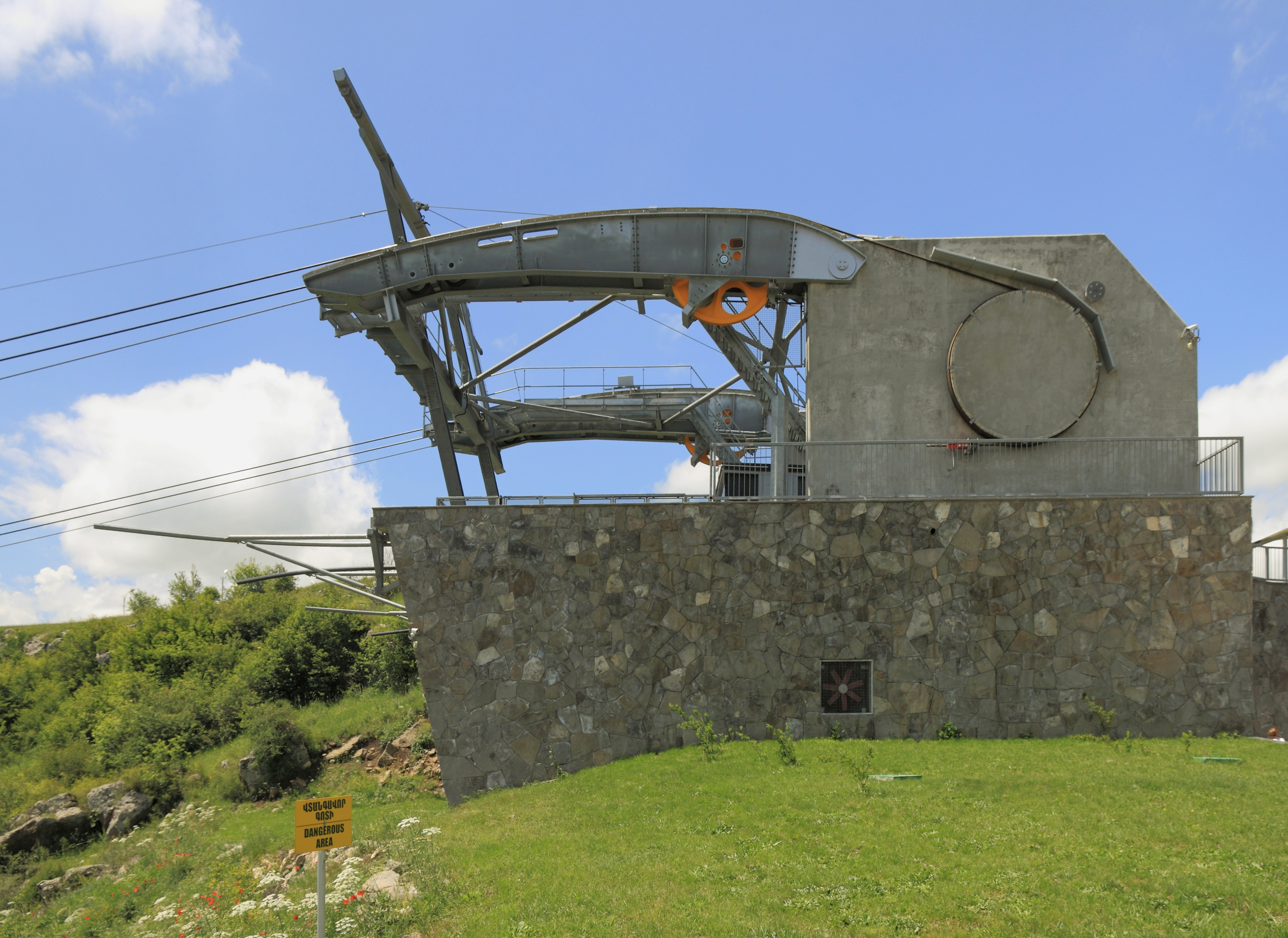
Wings of Tatev Halidzor station

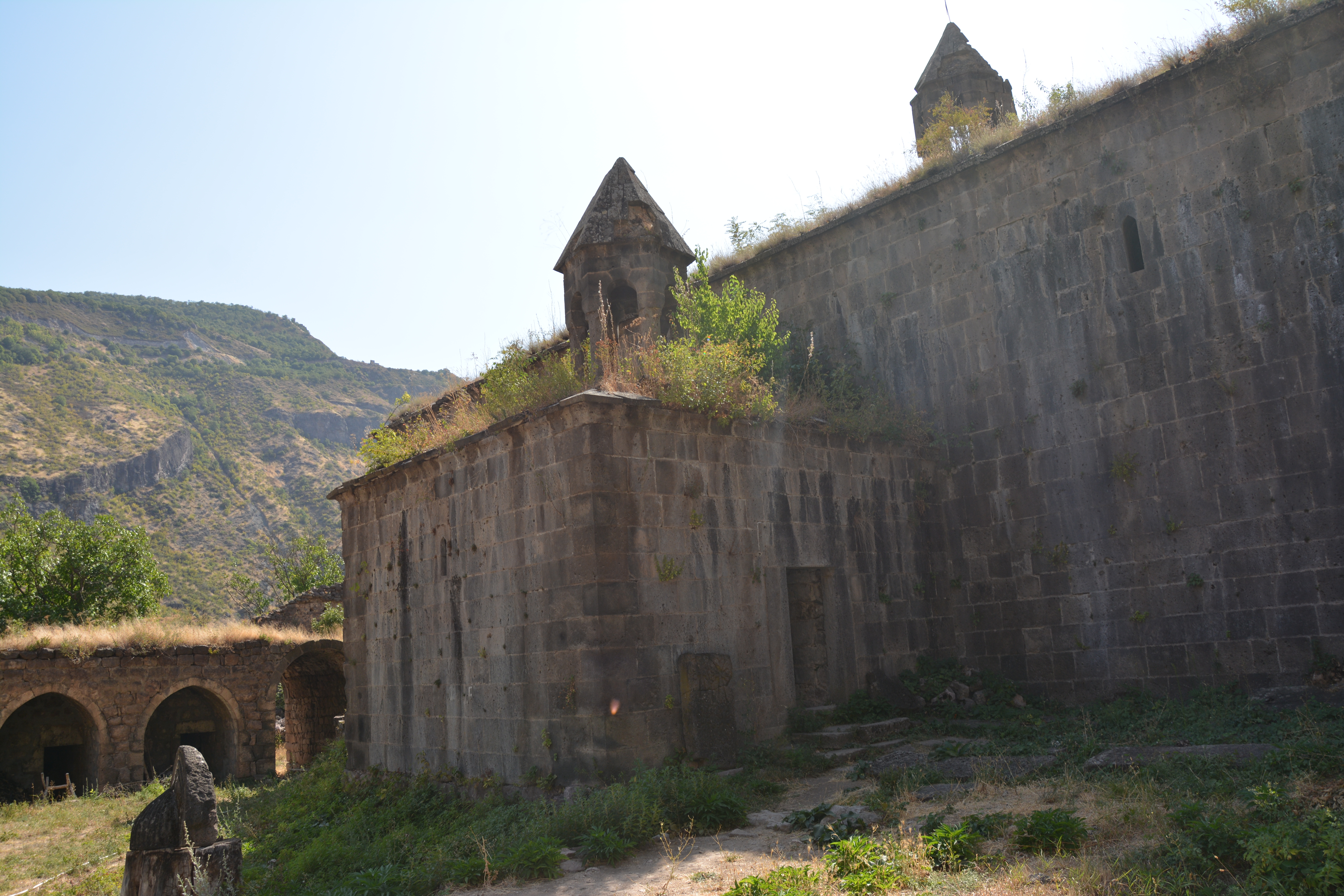
Syunyats Mets Anapat
