= Tatev Chakhian =

Armenian poet, artist, editor, translator (born 1992)

- Տաթև Չախեան
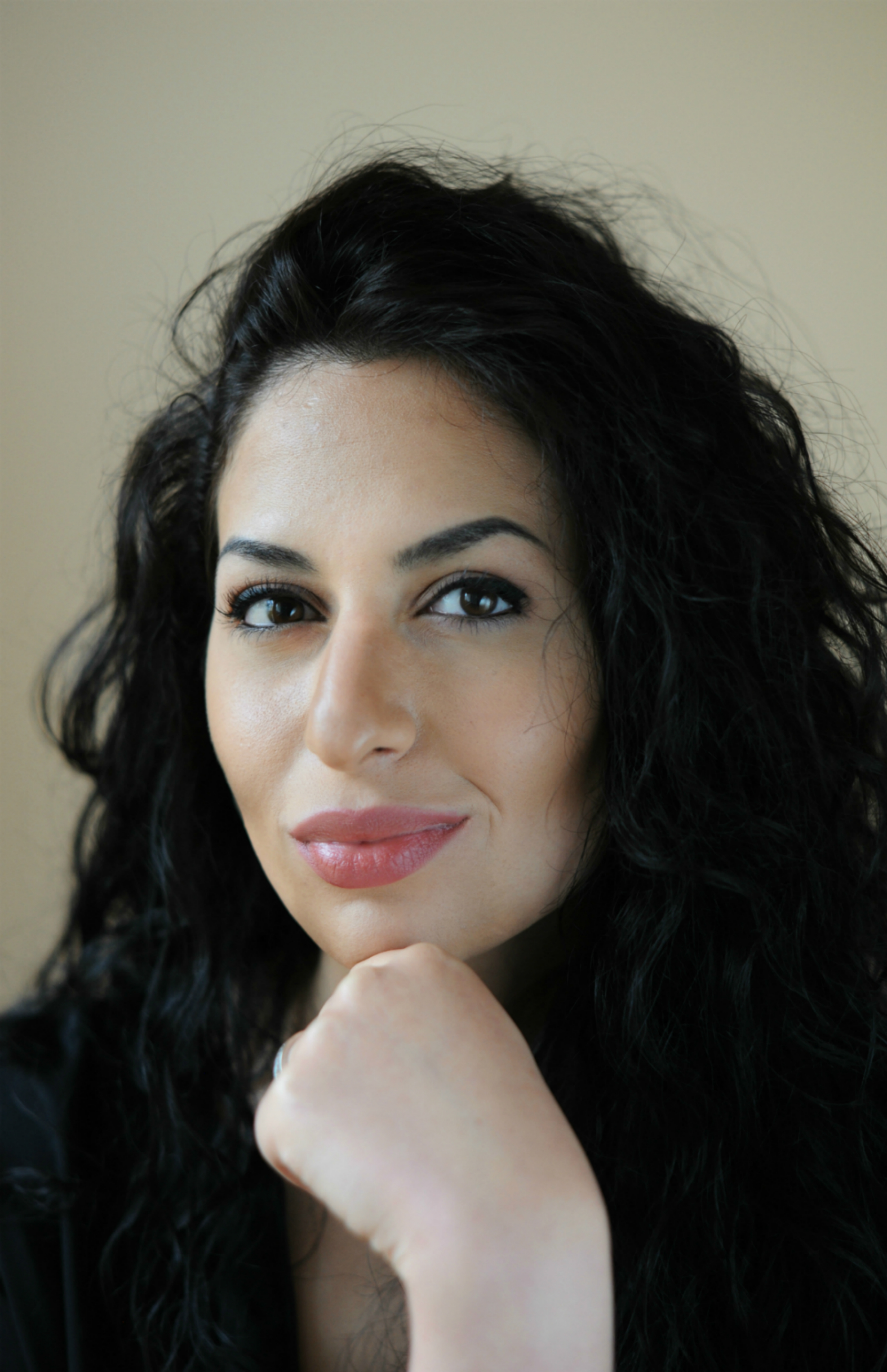
- Born: July 1, 1992 (age 34); Yerevan, Armenia
- Education: Yerevan State University, Faculty of Cultural Studies, Cultural Anthropology; Adam Mickiewicz University, Faculty of Political Science and Journalism; Adam Mickiewicz University, Faculty of English Philology
- Occupations: Poet, Translator
- Writing career
- Language: Armenian, English, Polish
- Website: tatevchakhian.com

Tatev Chakhian (Armenian: Տաթև Չախեան; b. July 1, 1992) is a Poland-based Armenian poet, translator and artist.

Her debut collection of poetry, անանձնաԳՐԱյին [unIDentical], was published in 2016 in Yerevan. The book was nominated for the European Poet of Freedom Literary Award and was published in Polish under the title Dowód (Nie)osobisty by Instytut Kultury Miejskiej in Gdańsk in 2018. Her second poetry collection, Migrant Point, was published by Actual Art in Yerevan in 2024. She writes in Eastern Armenian and English. Selections of her poetry have been translated into over twenty languages and have been published in anthologies and literary magazines worldwide.

Tatev Chakhian translates and promotes Polish poetry, Iranian contemporary poetry, and English-language literature.

Chakhian combines poetry with visual arts, such as paper collages, collaborates with artists, filmmakers and musicians.

== Early life and education ==
Born in Yerevan in 1992, into a family of pedagogues. She graduated from the faculty of Cultural Anthropology at Yerevan State University, then got a degree in International Relations and Border Studies at Adam Mickiewicz University in Poznań.

== Awards ==
Her awards include the Granish in the category of Poetry of The Year (2022), the Dionizy Maliszewski Literary Prize (2017), the Gazeta Obywatelska Literary Prize (2016), the Literary Award of the First Lady of Armenia (2016), and the Sahak Partev Prize (2015). Her first poetry collection անանձնաԳՐԱյին [unIDentical] was nominated for the 2018 European Poet of Freedom Award, dedicated to "honoring and promoting phenomena in poetry that deal with one of the most crucial subjects for contemporary readers – freedom – and, at the same time, are characterized by outstanding artistic values."
