= Wings of Tatev =

Cableway in Armenia

Coordinates: 39°24′59″N 46°17′49″E

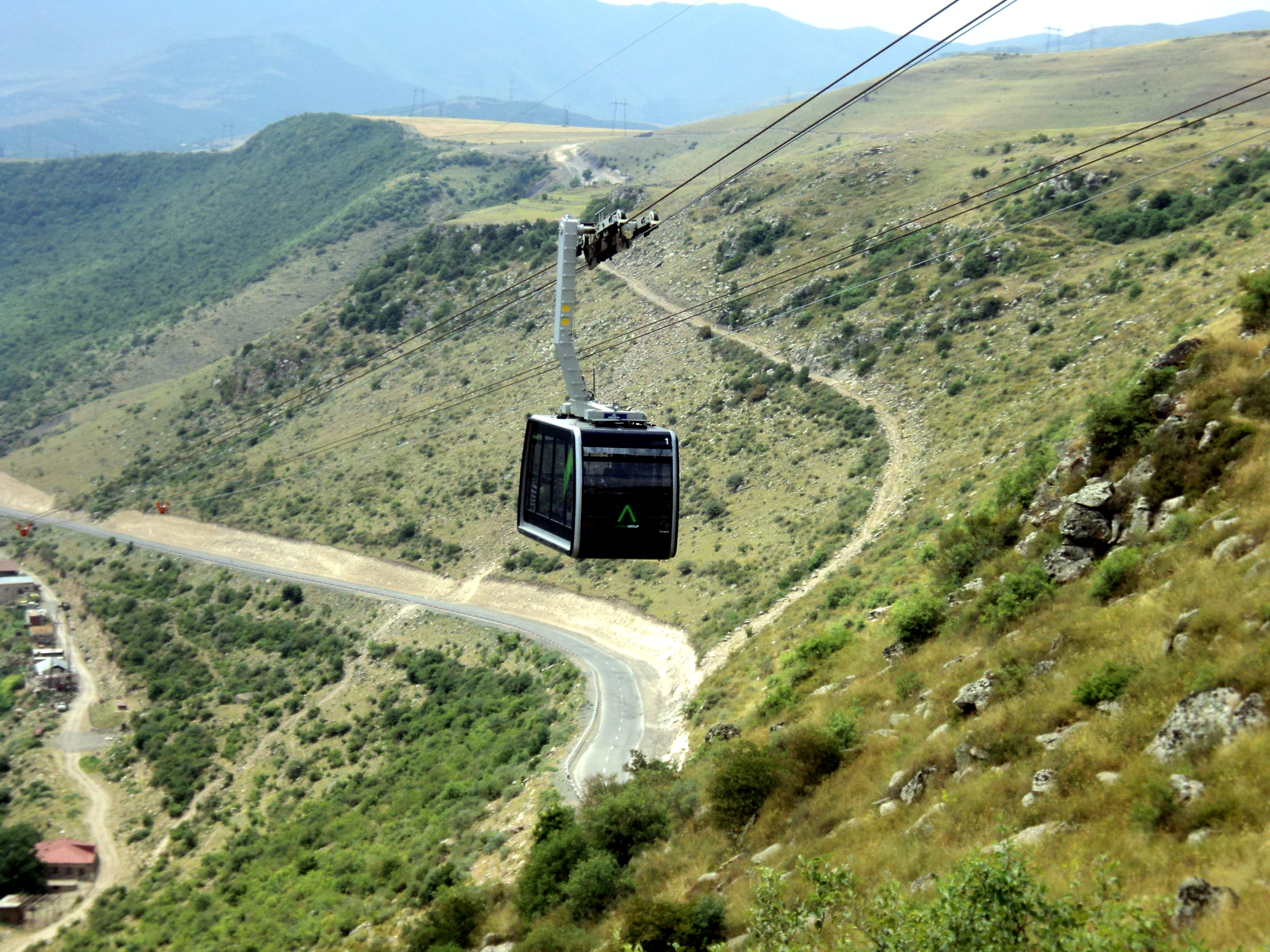
- Interactive map of Wings of Tatev

Overview
- Status: Operational
- Character: Aerial tramway
- Location: Syunik Province, Armenia
- Termini: Halidzor; Tatev village / monastery
- No. of stations: 2
- Open: 16 October 2010

Technical features
- Line length: 5.7 km (3.5 mi)
- Operating speed: 37 km/h (23 mph)

Wings of Tatev (Armenian: Տաթևի թևեր Tatevi tever) is a 5.7 km (3.5 mi) cableway between Halidzor and the Tatev monastery in Armenia. It is the longest reversible aerial tramway built in only one section, and holds the record for Longest non-stop double track cable car. Construction was finished on 16 October 2010.

Wings of Tatev aerial tramway is located in Syunik region, 250 km to the south of Yerevan.

Total ride time from Halidzor station to Tatev monastery is about 12 minutes; a much shorter trip than the 40-minute ride along the steep serpentine road that follows the Vorotan gorge. Flying over the gorge, the aerial tramway cabin reaches its maximum height of 320 meters. When the first cabin reaches the Tatev station, the second one arrives at the Halidzor station. After the Wings are reloaded, the movement starts again in the opposite direction. Each cabin accommodates 30 passengers and one steward. The ropeway can accommodate about 240 passengers per hour. Powerful pillars divide the ropeway into four sections. The longest section is 2.7 km and overlooks the Tatev monastic complex.

== History ==
The Wings of Tatev reversible aerial tramway was built within the framework of the Tatev Revival Project, the idea of which belongs to Ruben Vardanyan and Veronika Zonabend. It was constructed by the Austrian-Swiss Doppelmayr Garaventa Group. The aerial tramway was officially launched on 16 October 2010. In the same year, on 23 October, it set the Guinness World Record for the longest non-stop reversible aerial tramway. The longest cablecar was in Norsjö (13,2 km) in 2010.

Tatev Gateway is a non-commercial project; the entire profit from the project is invested in the restoration of Tatev Monastery and the development of the local community.

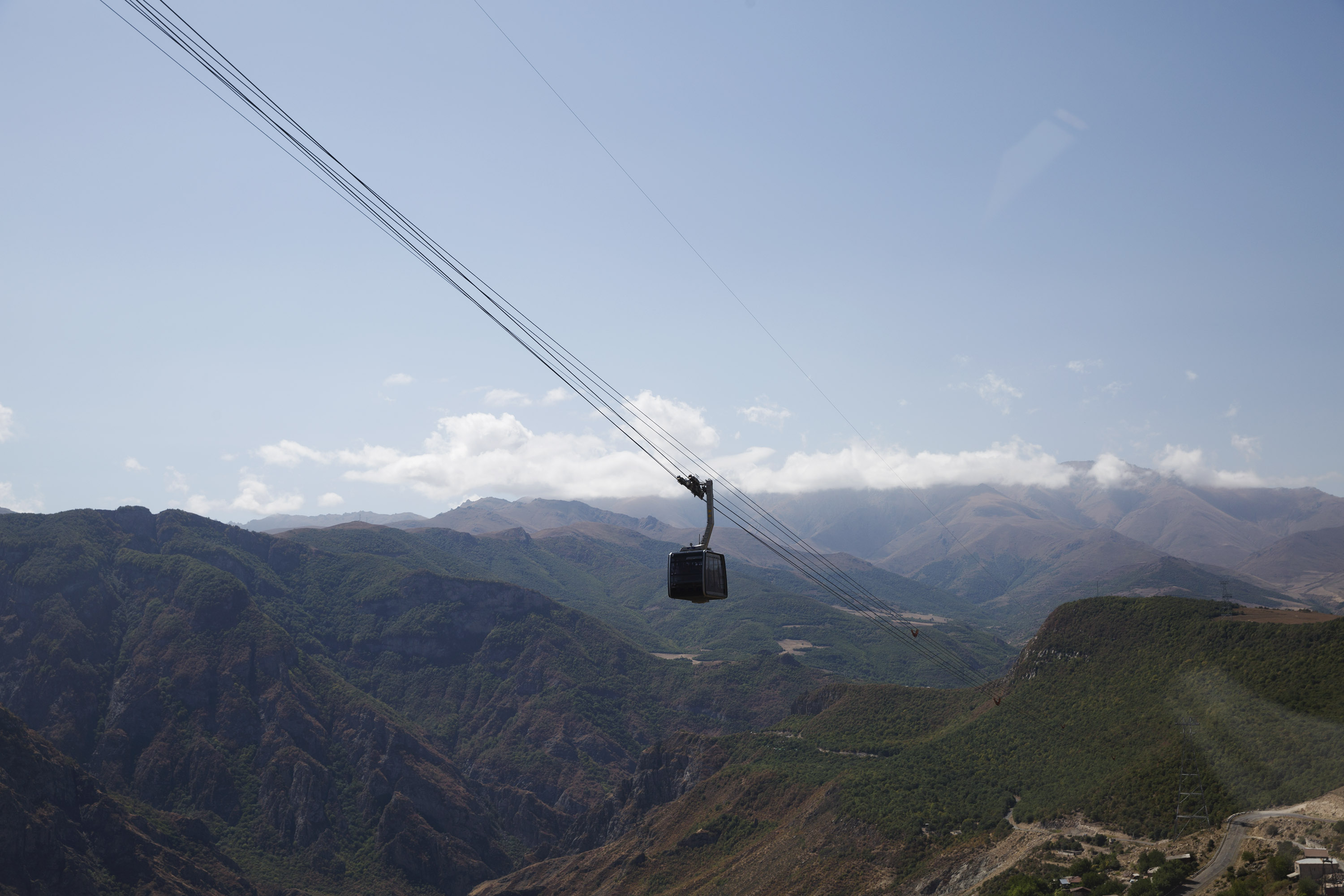
Wings of Tatev aerial tramway

== Technical information ==
- Type: non-stop, reversible aerial tramway
- Manufacturer: Doppelmayr/Garaventa Group (Austria, Switzerland)
- Length: 5,752 m
- Ride time: 11–15 minutes (depending on weather conditions)
- Cabin capacity: 25 passengers and an attendant
- Number of cabins: 2
- Maximum height: 320 m
- Maximum speed: 10 m/s
- Staff: 60 people

== Investments to the project ==
The Tatev Gateway Project has involved an investment of more than US$22 million. USD 16 million of this amount has been used for the construction of the aerial tramway; over US$1 million – for the construction of Tatevatun Restaurant; USD 1.5 million – for the development of infrastructures; and about US$670,000 for the site improvement.

== Statistics ==
From October 2010 to December 2019, the Wings of Tatev aerial tramway has welcomed more than 1 million passengers.

Number of passengers, October 2010 - December 2021
| | Quarter I | Quarter II | Quarter III | Quarter IV | Total |
| 2010 | | | | 9 108 | 9 108 |
| 2011 | 1 964 | 18 894 | 33 890 | 6 201 | 60 949 |
| 2012 | 994 | 18 605 | 42 317 | 8 448 | 70 364 |
| 2013 | 1 092 | 17 154 | 47 941 | 7 598 | 73 785 |
| 2014 | 1 834 | 26 524 | 59 377 | 9 651 | 97 386 |
| 2015 | 1 495 | 29 706 | 57 423 | 9 030 | 97 654 |
| 2016 | 3 087 | 24 853 | 57 119 | 11 262 | 96 321 |
| 2017 | 3 855 | 39 252 | 74 712 | 17 332 | 135 151 |
| 2018 | 7 932 | 43 183 | 83 210 | 18 627 | 152 952 |
| 2019 | 5 826 | 47 905 | 79 905 | 22 347 | 155 983 |
| 2020 | 4 017 | 3 059 | 25 030 | 114 | 32 220 (year of COVID-19 and Artsakh war) |
| 2021 | 1 284 | 15 757 | 38 846 | 11 856 | 67 743 |
| 2022 | 3 079 | 26,382 | 48,212 | 8,514 | 86,187 |

== Operating hours ==
The Wings of Tatev aerial tramway operates all year round, and the operating hours vary from season to season. In summer (June–August), the aerial tramway operates from 9 am to 8 pm; in colder weather (October–April), it operates from 10 am to 6 pm; in May and September, it operates from 10 am to 7 pm. During high summer season, the aerial tramway operates every day, without exception. The rest of the year, it runs on every day but Monday.

== Gallery ==
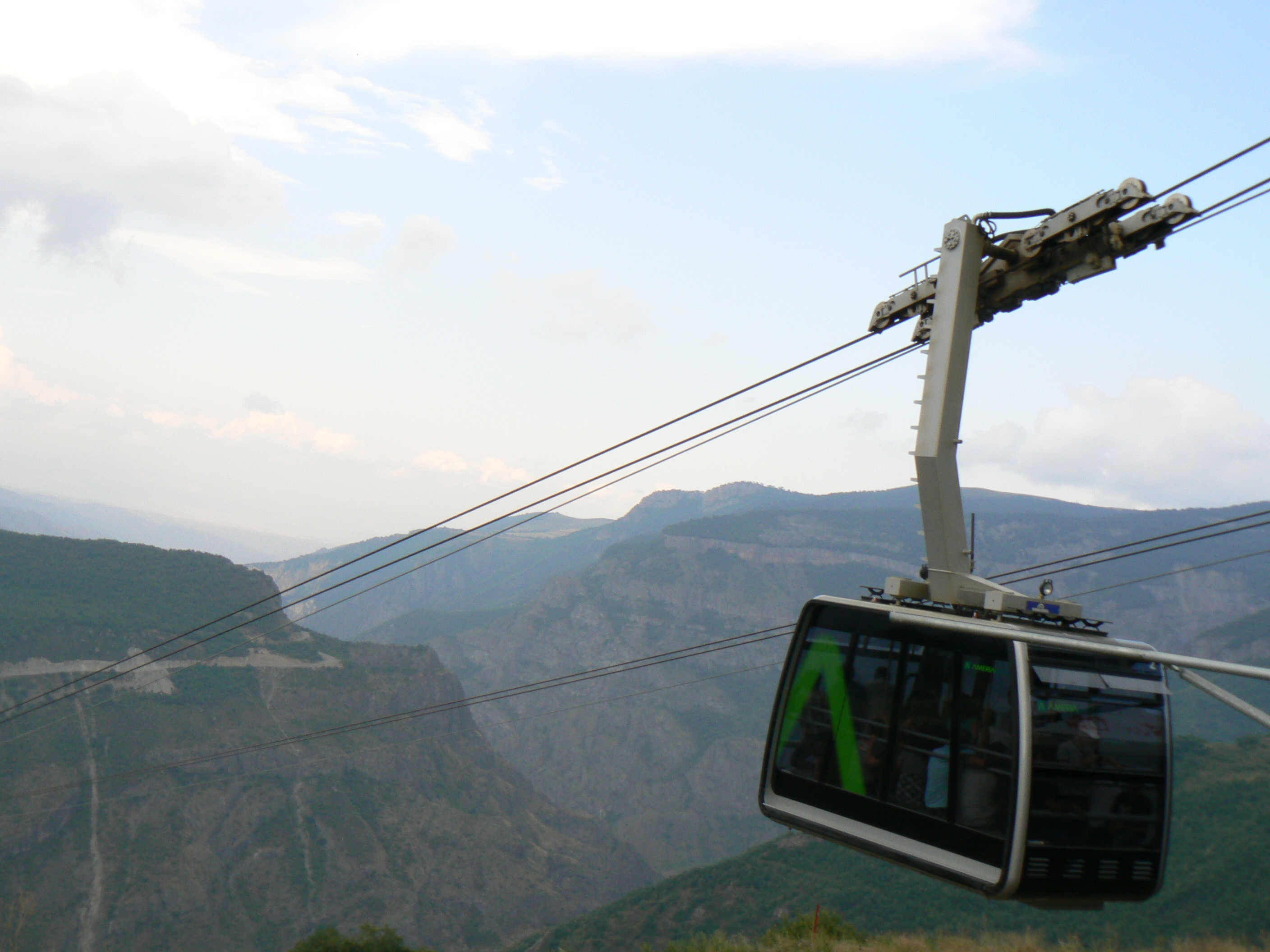
The tram

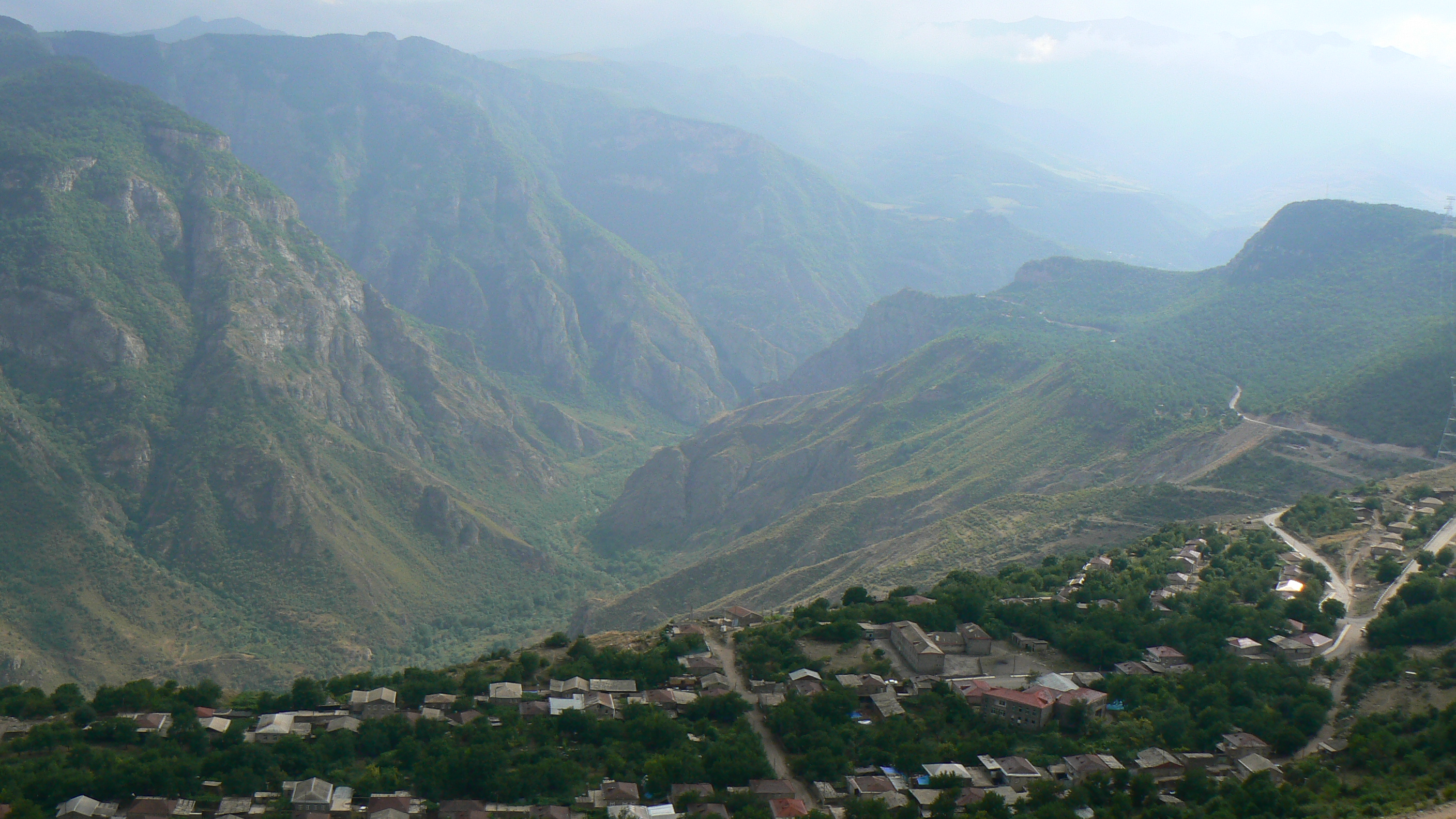
View from the tram

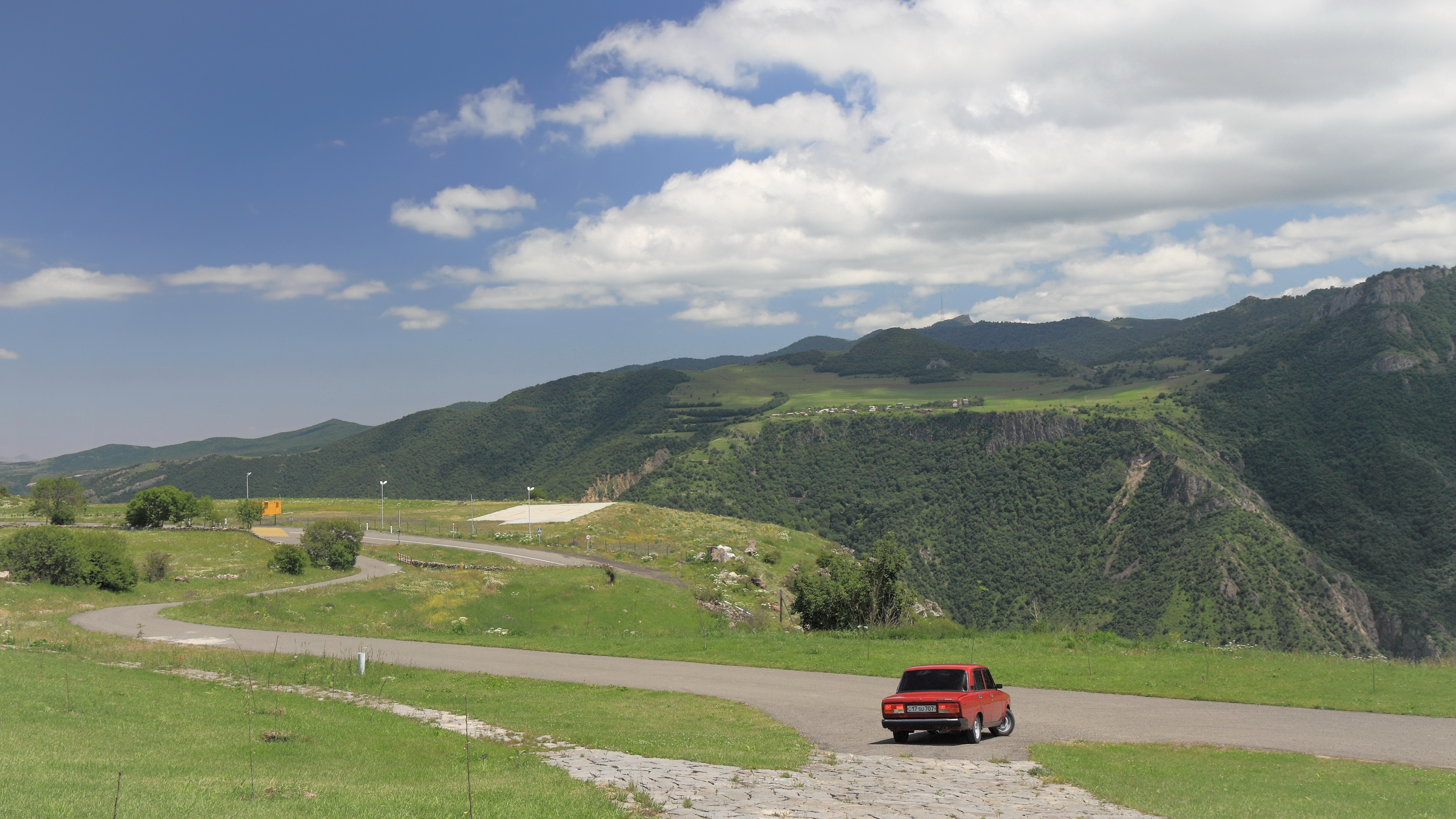
Road to the main buildings and lower station in Halidzor

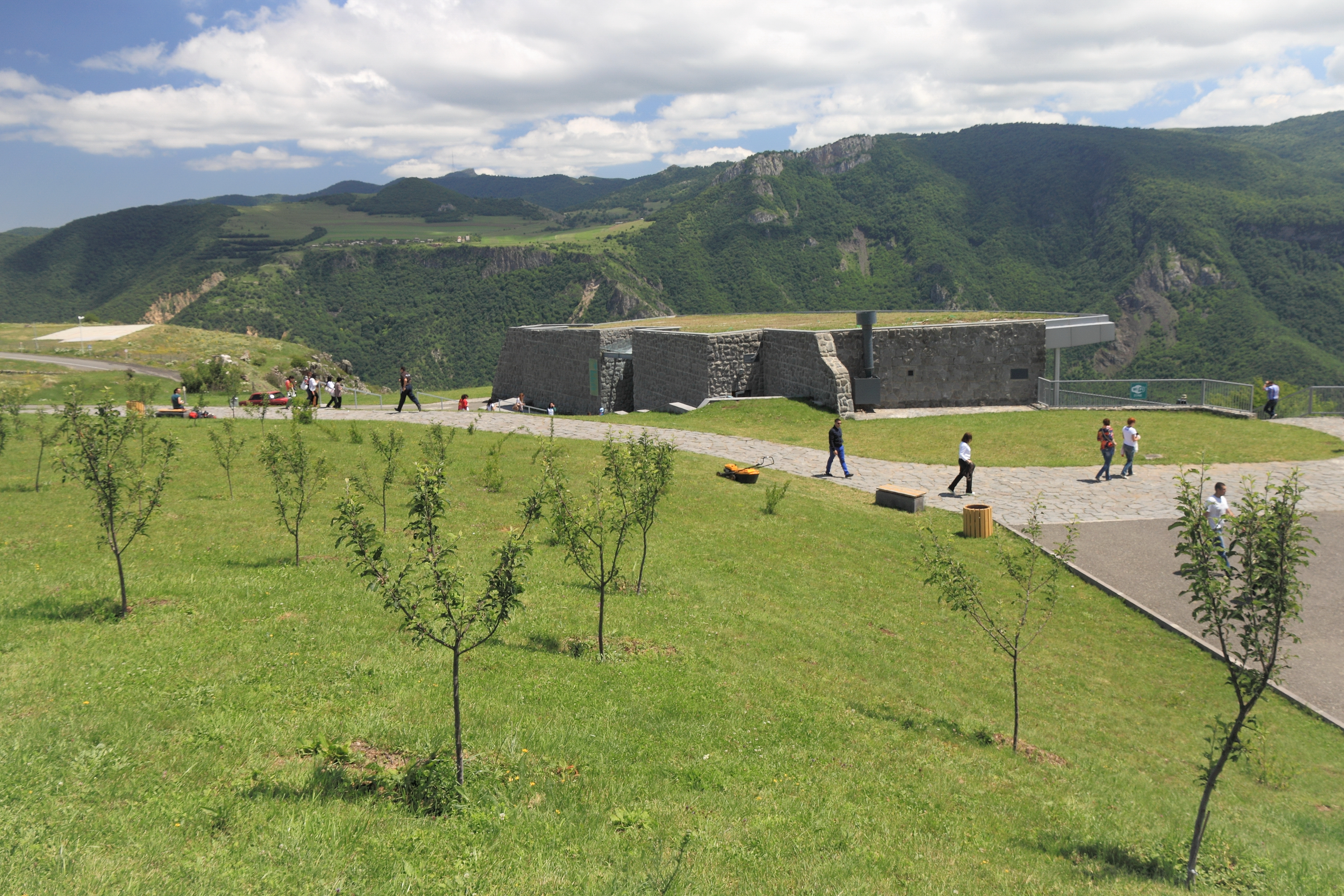
Main building (administration, restaurant, ticket office)

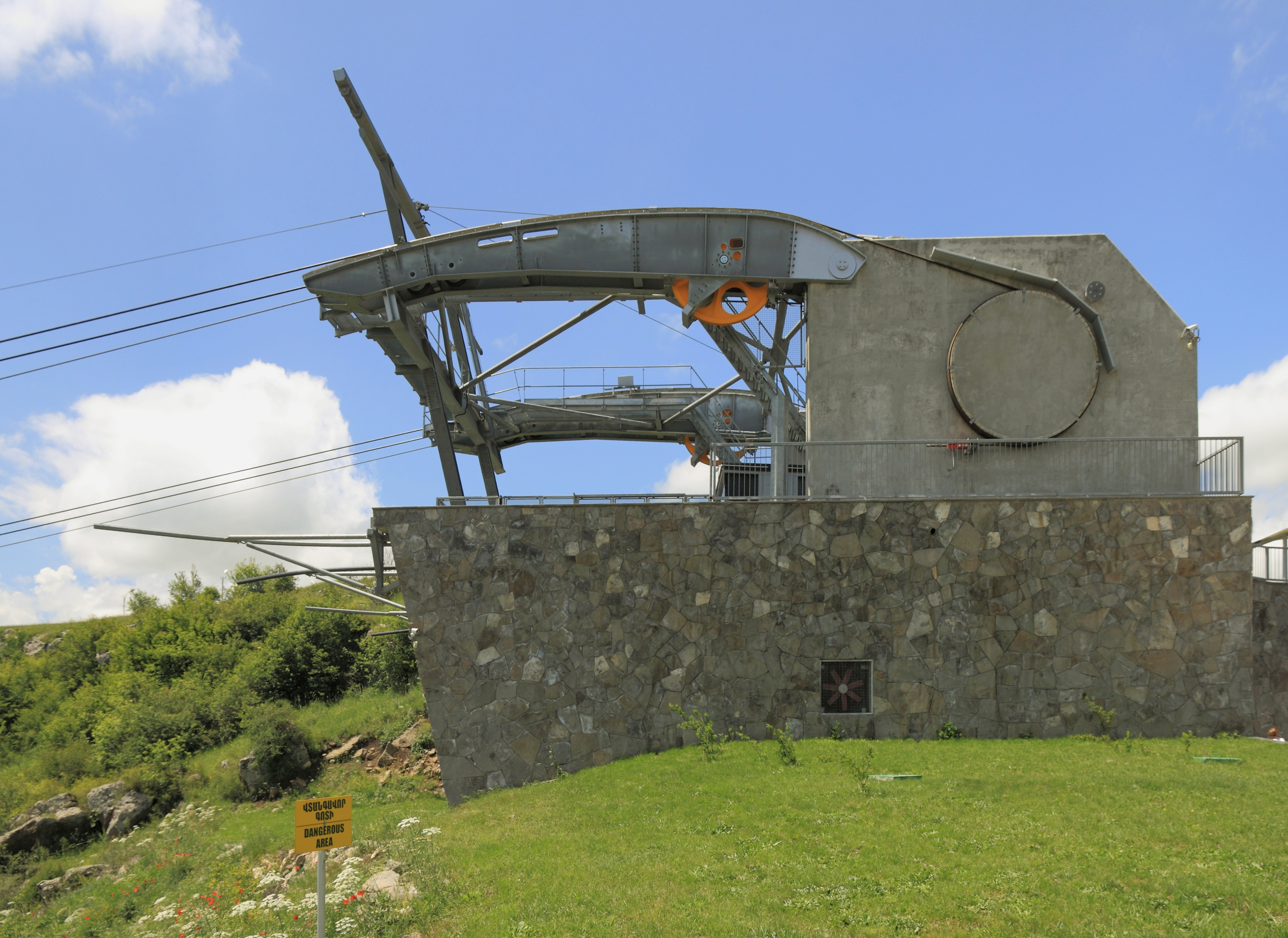
Lower station "Halidzor"

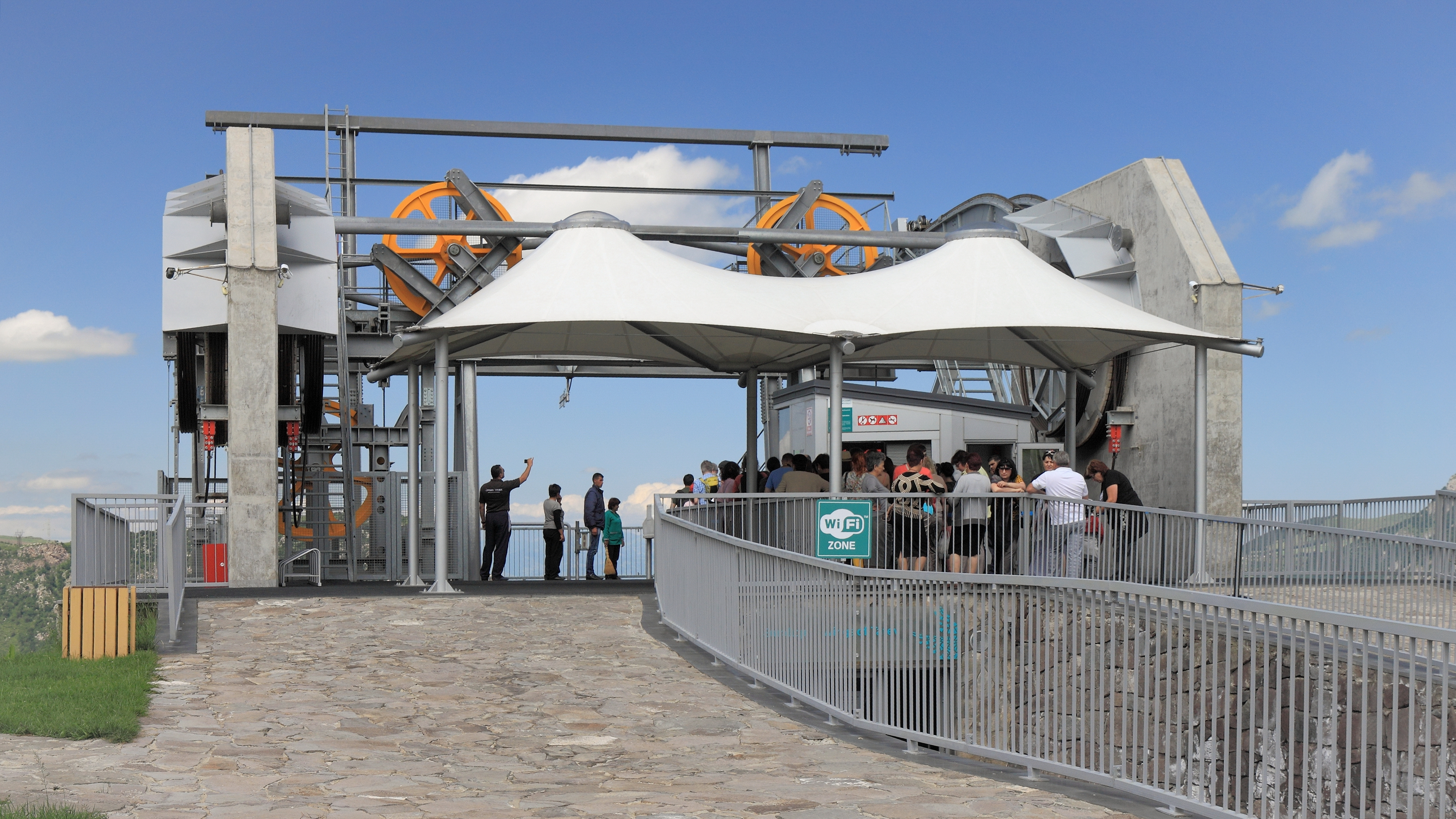
Upper station "Tatev"

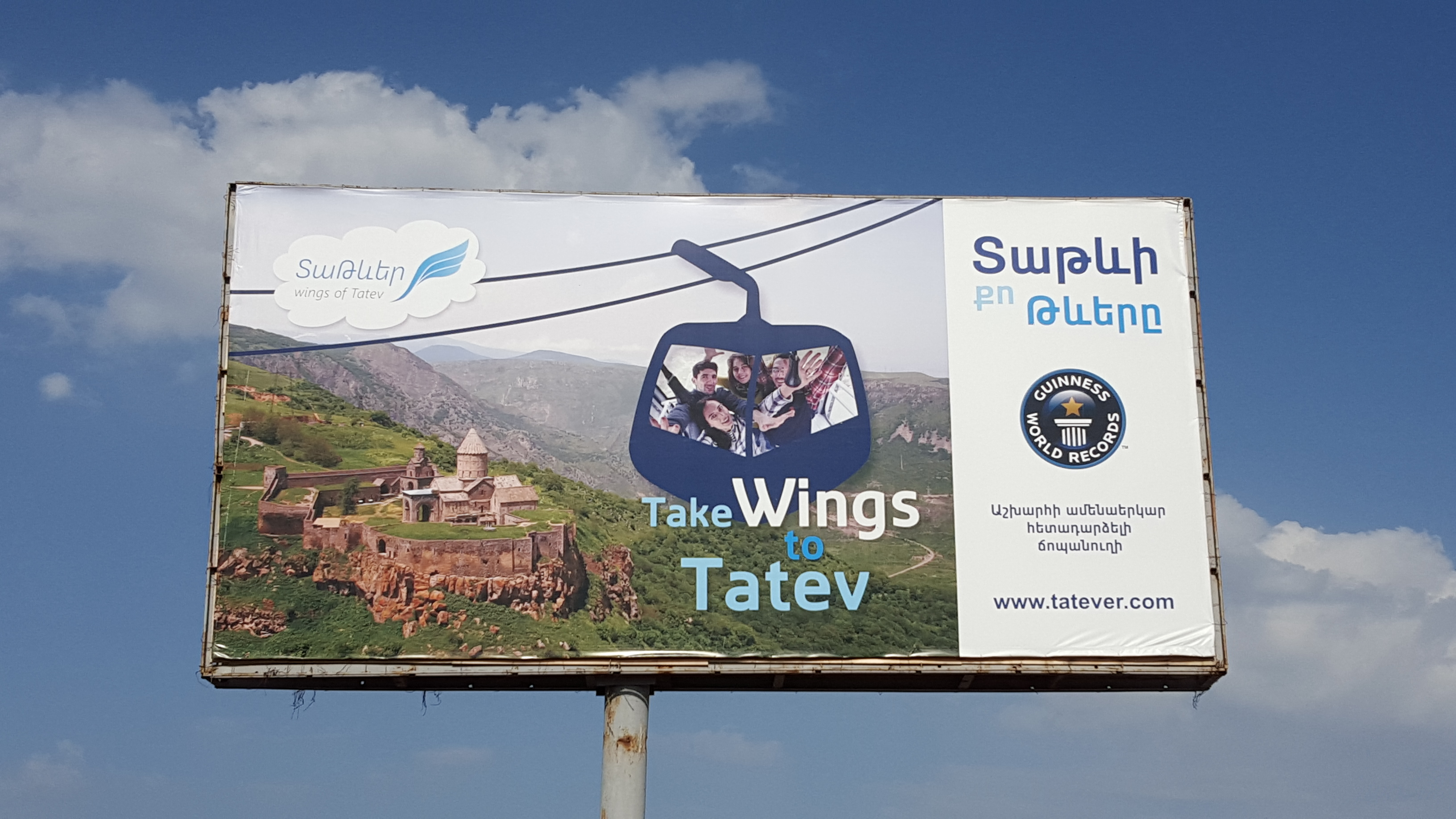
A billboard advertising the tramway near Goris
